= 1994 in association football =

The following are the association football events of the year 1994 throughout the world.

== Events ==
- January 15 – Manager Issy ten Donkelaar is fired by Netherlands club FC Twente, and replaced by Hans Meyer from Germany.
- January 19 – Erwin Koeman plays his last international match for the Netherlands national team, replacing Dennis Bergkamp in the second half of the friendly match in and against Tunisia (2–2). It is the 500th match in history of the Netherlands national team.
- April 20 – Edgar Davids makes his debut for the Netherlands national team in the friendly match against the Republic of Ireland (0–1) in Tilburg.
- May 14 – Manchester United wins 4–0 over Chelsea to claim the FA Cup.
- May 18 – AC Milan beat Barcelona 4–0, in the Champions League Final to claim their fifth crown .
- May 27 – Ruud Gullit plays his last and 66th international match for the Netherlands national team. Afterwards the striker declares he doesn't want to go to the 1994 FIFA World Cup under coach Dick Advocaat.
- July 9 – The Netherlands national team is eliminated in the quarterfinals of the 1994 FIFA World Cup by eventual winners Brazil. Branco scores the decisive goal in the 3–2 win for the South Americans. Ronald Koeman (78th cap), Frank Rijkaard (73rd) and Jan Wouters (70th) play their last international match for the Netherlands.
- July 17 – Brazil wins its record fourth World Cup, defeating Italy on penalties in the final of the 1994 FIFA World Cup in Pasadena, California. Superstar Diego Maradona was suspended from Cup competition for doping on Ephedrine.
- August 21 – Ajax Amsterdam claims the Dutch Super Cup, the annual opening of the new season in the Eredivisie, by a 3–0 win over Feyenoord Rotterdam in the Olympisch Stadion.
- November 16 – Ajax-striker Patrick Kluivert makes his debut for the Netherlands national team, replacing Youri Mulder in the 70th minute of the Euro qualifier against the Czech Republic (0–0) in Rotterdam.
- December 1 – Vélez Sársfield wins the Intercontinental Cup in Tokyo, Japan by defeating Italy's AC Milan (2–0).
- December 14 – Clarence Seedorf scores the fifth and last goal during his debut for the Netherlands national team against Luxembourg. Pierre van Hooijdonk also earns his first cap for the Netherlands.
- Copa Libertadores 1994: Won by Vélez Sársfield after defeating São Paulo FC 5–3 on a penalty shootout after a final aggregate score of 1–1.
- Scottish League Cup: Raith Rovers F.C. defeat Celtic F.C. 6–5 on penalties after the match finished 2–2.
- Malaysian football is involved in one of the largest match-fixing scandals in the sport's history.

== Winners club national championship ==
=== Asia ===
- Japan – Verdy Kawasaki
- Qatar – Al-Arabi
- South Korea – Ilhwa Chunma

=== Europe ===
- Austria – SV Salzburg
- Belgium – R.S.C. Anderlecht
- Croatia – Hajduk Split
- Denmark – Silkeborg IF
- England – Manchester United
- France – Paris Saint-Germain
- Germany – Bayern Munich
- Greece – AEK Athens
- Israel – Maccabi Haifa
- Italy – A.C. Milan
- Netherlands – Ajax Amsterdam
- Norway – Rosenborg
- Poland – Legia Warszawa
- Portugal – Benfica
- Romania – Steaua Bucharest
- Russia – Spartak Moscow
- Scotland – Rangers
- Spain – Barcelona
- Sweden – IFK Göteborg
- Turkey – Galatasaray S.K.
- Ukraine – Dynamo Kyiv
- Wales – Bangor City
- (Federal Republic of Yugoslavia) FR Yugoslavia – Partizan

=== North America ===
- Mexico – Tecos UAG
- United States / Canada – Montreal Impact (APSL)

=== South America ===
- Argentina
  - Clausura – Independiente
  - Apertura – River Plate
- Bolivia – Bolivia – Bolívar
- Brazil – Palmeiras
- Chile – Universidad de Chile
- Paraguay – Cerro Porteño
- Peru – Sporting Cristal

== International tournaments ==
- African Cup of Nations in Tunisia (March 26 – April 10, 1994)
  1. Nigeria
  2. Zambia
  3. Ivory Coast
- Baltic Cup in Vilnius, Lithuania (July 29 – 31 1994)
  1. Lithuania
  2. Latvia
  3. Estonia
- FIFA World Cup in the United States (June 17 – July 17, 1994)
  1. Brazil
  2. Italy
  3. Sweden

== Births ==
- January 6 – Denis Suárez, Spanish footballer
- January 15
  - Jordy Croux, Belgian footballer
  - Eric Dier, English footballer
- January 16 – Rikard Östlin, Swedish footballer
- January 19 – Denis Selishchev, Russian footballer
- January 21 – Elin Bergkvist, Swedish footballer
- January 24 – Juanpi, Venezuelan footballer
- January 27
  - Michael Schindele, German footballer
  - Jack Stephens, English footballer
- February 12 – Lukáš Mihálik, Slovak footballer
- February 16 – Guillermo Ferreras, Dominican footballer
- February 22 – Ivica Jurkić, Bosnian Croat footballer
- February 23 – André Caio, Portuguese footballer
- March 6
  - Wesley Hoedt, Dutch footballer
  - Nathan Redmond, English footballer
- March 7 – Zé Lucas, Brazilian footballer
- March 13 – Gerard Deulofeu, Spanish footballer
- March 17 – Marcel Sabitzer, Austrian footballer
- March 20 – Bryan Canela, Peruvian footballer
- March 27 – Yoan Cardinale, French goalkeeper
- April 9 – Brad Smith, Australian footballer
- April 13
  - Kahraba, Egyptian footballer
  - Bernhard Kotynski, Austrian footballer
  - Wojciech Onsorge, Polish footballer (d. 2026)
- May 5 – Javier Manquillo, Spanish footballer
- May 10
  - Tom Beissel, Dutch footballer
  - Jamar Loza, Jamaican footballer
- May 13 – Patrick Costinha, Portuguese footballer
- May 14 – Kike Echávarri, Spanish footballer
- May 21 – Felipe Zang, Brazilian footballer
- May 27
  - Maximilian Arnold, German footballer
  - João Cancelo, Portuguese footballer
  - Aymeric Laporte, French-Spanish footballer
- June 2 – Onyekachi Okafor, Nigerian footballer
- June 7 – Cornelia Sochor, Austrian footballer
- June 9 – Viktor Fischer, Danish footballer
- June 15
  - Vincent Janssen, Dutch footballer
  - Fred Lopes, Cape Verdean footballer
  - Iñaki Williams, Spanish footballer
- June 23 – Rodrigo Vera, Mexican footballer
- July 5 – Vinzenz Flatz, Liechtensteiner footballer
- July 7 – Ole Selnæs, Norwegian footballer
- July 10 – Iuri Medeiros, Portuguese footballer
- July 11 – Lucas Ocampos, Argentine footballer
- July 25 – Jordan Lukaku, Belgian footballer
- July 29 – Daniele Rugani, Italian footballer
- July 30 – Riccardo Cretella, Italian footballer
- August 3 – Corentin Tolisso, French footballer
- August 10 – Bernardo Silva, Portuguese footballer
- August 18 – Morgan Sanson, French footballer
- August 21 – Duvier Díaz, Colombian footballer
- August 28 – Junior Malanda, Belgian footballer (d. 2015)
- August 31 – Can Aktav, Turkish footballer
- September 8 – Bruno Fernandes, Portuguese footballer
- September 9
  - Dean Gardikiotis, footballer
  - Matt Macey, English footballer
- September 23 – Yerry Mina, Colombian footballer
- October 3 – Kepa Arrizabalaga, Spanish footballer
- October 24 – Bruma, Portuguese footballer
- November 10 – Óliver Torres, Spanish footballer
- November 21 – Saúl Ñíguez, Spanish footballer
- December 2 – Cauley Woodrow, English footballer
- December 5 – Grant Ward, English footballer
- December 10 – Matti Klinga, Finnish youth international
- December 29 – Louis Schaub, Austrian footballer

== Deaths ==
=== January ===
- January 20 – Matt Busby, Scottish footballer and manager

=== March ===
- March 20 – Alfonso Rodríguez 'Foncho', Spanish footballer

=== April ===
- April 18 – Dener, Brazilian forward, 2 times capped for the Brazil national football team and active player of CR Vasco da Gama. (23; in a car crash)

=== May ===
- May 30 – Agostino Di Bartolomei, Italian footballer

=== July ===
- July 2 – Andrés Escobar, Colombian footballer (murdered)
- July 4 – Ştefan Dobay, Romanian footballer

=== September ===
- September 10 – Max Morlock, German international footballer (born 1925)

=== December ===
- December 31 – Bruno Pezzey, Austrian footballer (born 1955)
