= Jurkić =

Jurkić is a surname. Notable people with the surname include:

- Dejan Jurkič (born 1983), Slovenian footballer
- Gabrijel Jurkić (1886–1974), Bosnian Croat artist
- Ivica Jurkić (born 1994), Bosnian Croat footballer
- Vesna Girardi-Jurkić (1944–2012), Croatian archeologist and museologist
