= August 31 =

August 31 this year in various calendars
- Monday, 31 August 2026
| Akan | Kwadwo |
| Armenian | 12 Hoṙi 1476 |
| Aztec | Atemoztli 13, 13 Cipactli |
| Babylonian | 17 Abu, 2337 SE |
| Balinese pawukon | Menga, Beteng, Jaya, Keliwon, Was, Coma of Uye, Guru, Jangur, Suka |
| Bengali | 16 Bhadro, BS 1433 |
| Chinese | Yin Fire Ox・Roof Mansion; Fire Horse Year, Month 7, Day 19 (Chushu, 7 days until Bailu) |
| Common Era | 31 August 2026 CE |
| Coptic | 25 Mesori, AM 1742 |
| Egyptian | 17 Tybi, 2775 NE |
| Ethiopian | 25 Naḥasē, 2018 Amätä Məhrät |
| French Republican | Décade II, Quartidi de Fructidor de l'Année 234 de la République |
| Gregorian | 31 August, AD 2026 |
| Hebrew | 18 Elul, AM 5786 |
| Hindu | Revatī・Śūla; Solar: 15 Bhādrapada, 1948 SE; Lunisolar: Tr̥tīyā, Kṛishna pakṣa of Śrāvaṇa, 2083 VE; Rāudra・5127 KY・1,872,818 |
| Icelandic | Mánudagur, 7 Tvímánuður 2026 |
| Islamic | 17 Rabi' al-awwal, AH 1448 (using tabular method) |
| ISO week date | 2026-W36-1 |
| Japanese | 19 Fumizuki, Reiwa 8 (Shosho, 7 days until Hakuro) |
| Julian | 18 August, AD 2026 (AM 7534) |
| Julian day | 2461284 |
| Korean | 19 Wonsungidal, 4359 DE |
| Maya | 13.0.13.16.1; 14 Mol, 13 Imix |
| Roman | ante diem XV Kalendas Septembres, MMDCCLXXIX AUC |
| Solar Hijri | 9 Shahrivar, SH 1405 |
| Tibetan | 18 gro bzhin, me pho rta 2153 or 1772 or 1000 |

| << | August | | | | | >> |
| Su | Mo | Tu | We | Th | Fr | Sa |
| | | | | | | 1 |
| 2 | 3 | 4 | 5 | 6 | 7 | 8 |
| 9 | 10 | 11 | 12 | 13 | 14 | 15 |
| 16 | 17 | 18 | 19 | 20 | 21 | 22 |
| 23 | 24 | 25 | 26 | 27 | 28 | 29 |
| 30 | 31 |
2026

August 31 in recent years
2026 (Monday)
2025 (Sunday)
2024 (Saturday)
2023 (Thursday)
2022 (Wednesday)
2021 (Tuesday)
2020 (Monday)
2019 (Saturday)
2018 (Friday)
2017 (Thursday)

August 31 is the 243rd day of the year (244th in leap years) in the Gregorian calendar; 122 days remain until the end of the year.

== Events ==
=== Pre-1600 ===
- 1056 – After a sudden gastric illness, Byzantine Empress Theodora dies childless, thus ending the Macedonian dynasty.
- 1218 – Al-Kamil becomes sultan of the Ayyubid dynasty.
- 1302 – Frederick III of Aragon and Charles, Count of Valois sign the Peace of Caltabellotta, which ends the War of the Sicilian Vespers and divides the old Kingdom of Sicily into an island portion and a peninsular portion.
- 1314 – King Haakon V moves the capital of Norway from Bergen to Oslo.
- 1420 – The 8.8–9.4 Caldera earthquake shakes Chile's Atacama Region causing tsunami in Chile, Hawaii, and Japan.
- 1422 – King Henry V of England dies of dysentery while in France and his son, Henry VI, becomes king at the age of nine months.
- 1483 – Under the influence of the Ottoman government, patriarch Symeon I convenes a synod of the Eastern Orthodox Churches in Constantinople which defines the ritual for admitting Catholics to the Eastern Orthodox Churches and condemns the church union of Ferrara-Florence.

=== 1601–1900 ===
- 1776 – William Livingston, the first Governor of New Jersey, begins serving his first term.
- 1795 – War of the First Coalition: The British capture Trincomalee (present-day Sri Lanka) from the Dutch in order to keep it out of French hands.
- 1798 – Irish Rebellion: Irish rebels, with French assistance, establish the short-lived Republic of Connacht.
- 1813 – Peninsular War: Spanish troops repel a French attack in the Battle of San Marcial.
- 1864 – American Civil War: The Battle of Jonesborough, the culmination of the Atlanta campaign, begins as Union forces under General William T. Sherman clash with Confederate troops under General William J. Hardee south of Atlanta.
- 1876 – Ottoman Sultan Murad V is deposed and succeeded by his brother, Abdul Hamid II.
- 1886 – The 7.0 M_{w} Charleston earthquake strikes southeastern South Carolina with a maximum Mercalli intensity of X (Extreme), killing 60 people and causing damage worth an estimated at $5 to $6 million.
- 1888 – Mary Ann Nichols, the first of Jack the Ripper's confirmed victims, is murdered.
- 1895 – German Count Ferdinand von Zeppelin patents his navigable balloon.

=== 1901–present ===
- 1907 – Russia and the United Kingdom sign the Anglo-Russian Convention, by which the UK recognizes Russian preeminence in northern Persia, while Russia recognizes British preeminence in southeastern Persia and Afghanistan. Both powers pledge not to interfere in Tibet.
- 1918 – World War I: Start of the Battle of Mont Saint-Quentin, a successful assault by the Australian Corps during the Hundred Days Offensive.
- 1920 – Polish–Soviet War: A decisive Polish victory in the Battle of Komarów.
- 1933 – The Integral Nationalist Group wins the 1933 Andorran parliamentary election, the first election in Andorra held with universal male suffrage.
- 1935 – In an attempt to stay out of the growing tensions concerning Germany and Japan, the United States passes the first of its Neutrality Acts.
- 1936 – Radio Prague, now the official international broadcasting station of the Czech Republic, goes on the air.
- 1939 – Nazi Germany mounts a false flag attack on the Gleiwitz radio station, creating an excuse to attack Poland the following day, thus starting World War II in Europe.
- 1940 – Pennsylvania Central Airlines Trip 19 crashes near Lovettsville, Virginia. The CAB investigation of the accident is the first investigation to be conducted under the Bureau of Air Commerce act of 1938.
- 1941 – World War II: Serbian paramilitary forces defeat Germans in the Battle of Loznica.
- 1943 – USS Harmon, the first U.S. Navy ship to be named after a black person, is commissioned.
- 1949 – The retreat of the Democratic Army of Greece into Albania after its defeat on Gramos mountain marks the end of the Greek Civil War.
- 1950 – TWA Flight 903 crashes near Itay El Barud, Egypt, killing all 55 aboard.
- 1957 – The Federation of Malaya (now Malaysia) gains its independence from the United Kingdom.
- 1959 – A parcel bomb sent by Ngô Đình Nhu, younger brother and chief adviser of South Vietnamese President Ngô Đình Diệm, fails to kill King Norodom Sihanouk of Cambodia.
- 1962 – Trinidad and Tobago becomes independent.
- 1963 – Crown Colony of North Borneo (now Sabah) achieves self-governance.
- 1968 – Start of the Congress of Carrara, one of the major 20th century anarchist congresses.
- 1972 – Aeroflot Flight 558 crashes in the Abzelilovsky District in Bashkortostan, Russia (then the Soviet Union), killing all 102 people aboard.
- 1986 – Aeroméxico Flight 498 collides with a Piper PA-28 Cherokee over Cerritos, California, killing 67 in the air and 15 on the ground.
- 1986 – The Soviet passenger liner Admiral Nakhimov sinks in the Black Sea after colliding with the bulk carrier Pyotr Vasev, killing 423.
- 1987 – Thai Airways Flight 365 crashes into the ocean near Ko Phuket, Thailand, killing all 83 aboard.
- 1988 – Delta Air Lines Flight 1141 crashes during takeoff from Dallas/Fort Worth International Airport, killing 14.
- 1988 – CAAC Flight 301 overshoots the runway at Kai Tak Airport and crashes into Kowloon Bay, killing seven people.
- 1991 – Kyrgyzstan declares its independence from the Soviet Union.
- 1993 – Russia completes removing its troops from Lithuania.
- 1994 – Russia completes removing its troops from Estonia.
- 1994 – Argentina abolishes conscription after months of social backlash over the murder of a conscript.
- 1996 – Saddam Hussein's troops seize Irbil after the Kurdish Masoud Barzani appealed for help to defeat his Kurdish rival PUK.
- 1997 – Diana, Princess of Wales, her partner, Dodi Fayed, and driver Henri Paul die in a car crash in Paris.
- 1999 – The first of a series of bombings in Moscow kills one person and wounds 40 others.
- 1999 – A LAPA Boeing 737-200 crashes during takeoff from Jorge Newbury Airport in Buenos Aires, killing 65, including two on the ground.
- 2002 – Typhoon Rusa, the most powerful typhoon to hit South Korea in 43 years, makes landfall, killing at least 236 people.
- 2005 – The 2005 Al-Aaimmah bridge stampede in Baghdad kills 953 people.
- 2006 – Edvard Munch's famous painting, The Scream, stolen on August 22, 2004, is recovered in a raid by Norwegian police.
- 2016 – Brazil's President Dilma Rousseff is impeached and removed from office.
- 2019 – A sightseeing helicopter crashes in the mountains of Skoddevarre in Alta, Norway, killing all six people on board.
- 2024 – A helicopter crashes in Kamchatka Krai in the Russian Far East, killing all 22 occupants.
- 2025 – A landslide in the Darfur region of Sudan kills over 1000 people.
- 2025 – An earthquake in eastern Afghanistan kills over 1400 people.

== Births ==
=== Pre-1600 ===
- 12 – Caligula, Roman emperor (died 41)
- 161 – Commodus, Roman emperor (died 192)
- 1018 – Jeongjong II, Korean ruler (died 1046)
- 1168 – Zhang Zong, Chinese emperor (died 1208)
- 1542 – Isabella de' Medici, Italian princess (died 1576)
- 1569 – Jahangir, Mughal emperor (died 1627)

=== 1601–1900 ===
- 1652 – Ferdinando Carlo Gonzaga, Italian nobleman (died 1708)
- 1663 – Guillaume Amontons, French physicist and instrument maker (died 1705)
- 1721 – George Hervey, 2nd Earl of Bristol, English soldier and politician, Lord Lieutenant of Ireland (died 1775)
- 1741 – Jean-Paul-Égide Martini, French composer and educator (died 1816)
- 1748 – Jean-Étienne Despréaux, French ballet dancer, choreographer, composer, and playwright (died 1820)
- 1767 – Henry Joy McCracken, Irish businessman and activist, founded the Society of United Irishmen (died 1798)
- 1775 – Agnes Bulmer, English poet and author (died 1836)
- 1797 – Ramón Castilla, Peruvian military leader and politician, President of Peru (died 1867)
- 1797 – Stephen Geary, English architect, inventor and entrepreneur (died 1854)
- 1802 – Husein Gradaščević, Ottoman general (died 1834)
- 1811 – Théophile Gautier, French poet and critic (died 1872)
- 1821 – Hermann von Helmholtz, German physician and physicist (died 1894)
- 1823 – Galusha A. Grow, American lawyer and politician, 28th Speaker of the United States House of Representatives (died 1907)
- 1834 – Amilcare Ponchielli, Italian composer and educator (died 1886)
- 1842 – Josephine St. Pierre Ruffin, American journalist, publisher, and activist (died 1924)
- 1843 – Georg von Hertling, German academic and politician, 7th Chancellor of the German Empire (died 1919)
- 1870 – Maria Montessori, Italian physician and educator (died 1952)
- 1871 – James E. Ferguson, American banker and politician, 26th governor of Texas (died 1944)
- 1875 – Rosa Lemberg, Namibian-born Finnish American teacher, singer and choral conductor (died 1959)
- 1878 – Frank Jarvis, American sprinter and lawyer (died 1933)
- 1879 – Alma Mahler, Austrian-American composer and author (died 1964)
- 1879 – Taishō, Emperor of Japan (died 1926)
- 1880 – Wilhelmina, queen of the Netherlands (died 1962)
- 1883 – Ramón Fonst, Cuban fencer (died 1959)
- 1884 – George Sarton, Belgian-American historian of science (died 1956)
- 1885 – DuBose Heyward, American author and playwright (died 1940)
- 1890 – August Alle, Estonian poet and author (died 1952)
- 1890 – Nätti-Jussi, Finnish lumberjack and forest laborer (died 1964)
- 1893 – Lily Laskine, French harp player (died 1988)
- 1894 – Albert Facey, Australian soldier and author (died 1982)
- 1896 – Brian Edmund Baker, English Air Marshal (died 1979)
- 1896 – Félix-Antoine Savard, Canadian priest and author (died 1982)
- 1897 – Fredric March, American actor (died 1975)
- 1900 – Gino Lucetti, Italian anarchist, attempted assassin of Benito Mussolini (died 1943)

=== 1901–present ===
- 1902 – Géza Révész, Hungarian general and politician, Hungarian Minister of Defence (died 1977)
- 1903 – Arthur Godfrey, American radio and television host (died 1983)
- 1903 – Vladimir Jankélévitch, French musicologist and philosopher (died 1985)
- 1905 – Robert Bacher, American physicist and academic (died 2004)
- 1905 – Sanford Meisner, American actor and educator (died 1997)
- 1907 – Valter Biiber, Estonian footballer (died 1977)
- 1907 – Augustus F. Hawkins, American lawyer and politician (died 2007)
- 1907 – Ramon Magsaysay, Filipino captain, engineer, and politician, 7th President of the Philippines (died 1957)
- 1907 – William Shawn, American journalist (died 1992)
- 1907 – Altiero Spinelli, Italian theorist and politician (died 1986)
- 1908 – William Saroyan, American novelist, playwright, and short story writer (died 1981)
- 1909 – Ferenc Fejtő, Hungarian-French journalist and political scientist (died 2008)
- 1911 – Edward Brongersma, Dutch journalist and politician (died 1998)
- 1911 – Arsenio Rodríguez, Cuban-American tres player, composer, and bandleader (died 1970)
- 1913 – Helen Levitt, American photographer and cinematographer (died 2009)
- 1913 – Bernard Lovell, English physicist and astronomer (died 2012)
- 1914 – Richard Basehart, American actor (died 1984)
- 1915 – Pete Newell, American basketball player and coach (died 2008)
- 1916 – Danny Litwhiler, American baseball player and coach (died 2011)
- 1916 – Daniel Schorr, American journalist and author (died 2010)
- 1916 – John S. Wold, American geologist and politician (died 2017)
- 1918 – Alan Jay Lerner, American songwriter and composer (died 1986)
- 1919 – Amrita Pritam, Indian poet and author (died 2005)
- 1921 – Otis G. Pike, American judge and politician (died 2014)
- 1921 – Raymond Williams, Welsh author and academic (died 1988)
- 1924 – John Davidson, American physician and politician (died 2012)
- 1924 – Buddy Hackett, American actor and singer (died 2003)
- 1924 – Herbert Wise, Austrian-English director and producer (died 2015)
- 1925 – Ted Blakey, American historian, activist, and businessman (died 2004)
- 1925 – Moran Campbell, English-Canadian physician and academic, invented the venturi mask (died 2004)
- 1925 – Maurice Pialat, French actor and director (died 2003)
- 1928 – James Coburn, American actor (died 2002)
- 1928 – Jaime Sin, Filipino cardinal (died 2005)
- 1930 – Big Tiny Little, American pianist (died 2010)
- 1931 – Jean Béliveau, Canadian ice hockey player (died 2014)
- 1931 – Rolf Just Nilsen, Norwegian singer and actor (died 1981)
- 1931 – Noble Willingham, American actor (died 2004)
- 1932 – Allan Fotheringham, Canadian journalist (died 2020)
- 1932 – Roy Castle, English dancer, singer, comedian, actor, television presenter and musician (died 1994)
- 1935 – Eldridge Cleaver, American activist and author (died 1998)
- 1935 – Bryan Organ, English painter
- 1935 – Frank Robinson, American baseball player and manager (died 2019)
- 1936 – Vladimir Orlov, Russian journalist and author (died 2014)
- 1937 – Warren Berlinger, American actor (died 2020)
- 1937 – Bobby Parker, American singer-songwriter and guitarist (died 2013)
- 1938 – Martin Bell, English journalist and politician
- 1939 – Jerry Allison, American drummer and songwriter (died 2022)
- 1940 – Robbie Basho, American guitarist, pianist, and composer (died 1986)
- 1940 – Wilton Felder, American saxophonist and bass player (died 2015)
- 1940 – Larry Hankin, American actor, director, and producer
- 1940 – Roger Newman, English-American actor and screenwriter (died 2010)
- 1940 – Jack Thompson, Australian actor
- 1941 – William DeWitt, Jr., American businessman
- 1941 – Emmanuel Nunes, Portuguese-French composer and educator (died 2012)
- 1942 – Isao Aoki, Japanese golfer
- 1943 – Leonid Ivashov, Russian general
- 1944 – Roger Dean, English illustrator and publisher
- 1944 – Liz Forgan, English journalist
- 1944 – Christine King, English historian and academic
- 1944 – Clive Lloyd, Guyanese cricketer
- 1945 – Van Morrison, Northern Irish singer-songwriter
- 1945 – Itzhak Perlman, Israeli-American violinist and conductor
- 1945 – Bob Welch, American singer and guitarist (died 2012)
- 1946 – Ann Coffey, Scottish social worker and politician
- 1946 – Jerome Corsi, American conspiracy theorist and author
- 1946 – Tom Coughlin, American football player and coach
- 1947 – Luca Cordero di Montezemolo, Italian businessman
- 1947 – Yumiko Ōshima, Japanese author and illustrator
- 1947 – Somchai Wongsawat, Thai lawyer and politician, 26th Prime Minister of Thailand
- 1948 – Harald Ertl, Austrian race car driver and journalist (died 1982)
- 1948 – Lowell Ganz, American screenwriter and producer
- 1948 – Ken McMullen, English director, producer, and screenwriter
- 1948 – Holger Osieck, German footballer and manager
- 1948 – Rudolf Schenker, German guitarist and songwriter
- 1949 – Richard Gere, American actor and producer
- 1949 – Stephen McKinley Henderson, American actor
- 1949 – Hugh David Politzer, American physicist and academic, Nobel Prize laureate
- 1949 – Rick Roberts, American country-rock singer-songwriter and guitarist
- 1950 – Eduardo Nonato Joson, Filipino politician (died 2025)
- 1951 – Grant Batty, New Zealand rugby player
- 1952 – Kim Kashkashian, American viola player and educator
- 1952 – Herbert Reul, German politician
- 1953 – Marcia Clark, American attorney and author
- 1953 – Miguel Ángel Guerra, Argentine race car driver
- 1953 – György Károly, Hungarian poet and author (died 2018)
- 1953 – Pavel Vinogradov, Russian astronaut and engineer
- 1953 – Elisabeth Kværne, Norwegian langeleik player (died 2024)
- 1954 – Julie Brown, American actress and screenwriter
- 1955 – Aleksander Krupa, Polish-American actor
- 1955 – Julie Maxton, Scottish lawyer and academic
- 1955 – Edwin Moses, American hurdler
- 1955 – Anthony Thistlethwaite, English saxophonist and bass player
- 1955 – Gary Webb, American journalist and author (died 2004)
- 1956 – Mária Balážová, Slovak painter and illustrator
- 1956 – Kent Nilsson, Swedish ice hockey player
- 1956 – Masashi Tashiro, Japanese singer, actor, and director
- 1956 – Tsai Ing-wen, Taiwanese politician and the President of the Republic of China
- 1957 – Colm O'Rourke, Irish footballer and sportscaster
- 1957 – Gina Schock, American drummer
- 1957 – Glenn Tilbrook, English singer-songwriter and guitarist
- 1958 – Serge Blanco, Venezuelan-French rugby player and businessman
- 1958 – Stephen Cottrell, English bishop
- 1959 – Ralph Krueger, Canadian ice hockey player and coach
- 1959 – Jessica Upshaw, American lawyer and politician (died 2013)
- 1960 – Vali Ionescu, Romanian long jumper
- 1960 – Chris Whitley, American singer-songwriter and guitarist (died 2005)
- 1960 – Hassan Nasrallah, Lebanese politician, 3rd Secretary-General of Hezbollah (died 2024)
- 1961 – Kieran Crowley, New Zealand rugby player
- 1961 – Magnus Ilmjärv, Estonian historian and author
- 1962 – Dee Bradley Baker, American voice actor
- 1963 – Reb Beach, American guitarist
- 1963 – Rituparno Ghosh, Indian actor, director, and screenwriter (died 2013)
- 1963 – Sonny Silooy, Dutch footballer and manager
- 1964 – Raymond P. Hammond, American poet and critic
- 1965 – Zsolt Borkai, Hungarian gymnast and politician
- 1965 – Susan Gritton, English soprano and actress
- 1966 – Lyuboslav Penev, Bulgarian footballer and manager
- 1967 – Gene Hoglan, American drummer
- 1967 – Anita Moen, Norwegian skier
- 1968 – Valdon Dowiyogo, Nauruan politician (died 2016)
- 1968 – Hideo Nomo, Japanese baseball player
- 1968 – Jolene Watanabe, American tennis player (died 2019)
- 1969 – Nathalie Bouvier, French skier
- 1969 – Jonathan LaPaglia, Australian actor and physician
- 1969 – Jeff Russo, American musician
- 1969 – Javagal Srinath, Indian cricketer and referee
- 1969 – Andrew Cunanan, American spree killer (died 1997)
- 1970 – Debbie Gibson, American singer-songwriter, producer, and actress
- 1970 – Nikola Gruevski, Macedonian economist and politician, 6th Prime Minister of the Republic of Macedonia
- 1970 – Greg Mulholland, English politician
- 1970 – Queen Rania of Jordan
- 1970 – Arie van Lent, Dutch-German footballer and manager
- 1970 – Zack Ward, Canadian actor and producer
- 1971 – Kirstie Allsopp, British TV presenter
- 1971 – Pádraig Harrington, Irish golfer
- 1971 – Vadim Repin, Belgian-Russian violinist
- 1971 – Chris Tucker, American comedian and actor
- 1973 – Scott Niedermayer, Canadian ice hockey player and coach
- 1974 – Andriy Medvedev, Ukrainian-Monégasque tennis player
- 1975 – Craig Cumming, New Zealand cricketer and sportscaster
- 1975 – John Grahame, American ice hockey player and coach
- 1975 – Sara Ramirez, Mexican-American actor and musician
- 1976 – Vincent Delerm, French singer-songwriter and pianist
- 1976 – Shar Jackson, American actress and singer
- 1976 – Roque Júnior, Brazilian footballer and manager
- 1976 – Radek Martínek, Czech ice hockey player
- 1977 – Jeff Hardy, American wrestler and singer
- 1977 – Ian Harte, Irish footballer
- 1977 – Craig Nicholls, Australian singer-songwriter and guitarist
- 1977 – Arzu Yanardağ, Turkish actress and model
- 1978 – Philippe Christanval, French footballer
- 1978 – Ido Pariente, Israeli mixed martial artist and trainer
- 1978 – Jennifer Ramírez Rivero, Venezuelan model
- 1978 – Craig Stapleton, Australian rugby league player
- 1978 – Sandis Valters, Latvian basketball player
- 1978 – Morten Qvenild, Norwegian pianist and composer
- 1979 – Clay Hensley, American baseball player
- 1979 – Mark Johnston, Canadian swimmer
- 1979 – Yara Martinez, Puerto Rican-American actress
- 1979 – Simon Neil, Scottish singer-songwriter, guitarist, and producer
- 1979 – Yuvan Shankar Raja, Indian Tamil singer-songwriter and producer
- 1979 – Ramón Santiago, Dominican baseball player
- 1979 – Mickie James, American wrestler
- 1980 – Joe Budden, American broadcaster and former rapper
- 1981 – Ahmad Al Harthy, Omani race car driver
- 1981 – Dwayne Peel, Welsh rugby player
- 1981 – Steve Saviano, American ice hockey player
- 1982 – Ian Crocker, American swimmer
- 1982 – Chris Duhon, American basketball player
- 1982 – Lien Huyghebaert, Belgian sprinter
- 1982 – Christopher Katongo, Zambian footballer
- 1982 – Josh Kroeger, American baseball player
- 1982 – Alexei Mikhnov, Ukrainian-Russian ice hockey player
- 1982 – Pepe Reina, Spanish footballer
- 1982 – Michele Rugolo, Italian race car driver
- 1982 – G. Willow Wilson, American journalist and author
- 1983 – Deniz Aydoğdu, German-Turkish footballer
- 1983 – Milan Biševac, Serbian footballer
- 1983 – Larry Fitzgerald, American football player
- 1984 – Matti Breschel, Danish cyclist
- 1984 – Ryan Kesler, American ice hockey player
- 1984 – Ted Ligety, American skier
- 1984 – Charl Schwartzel, South African golfer
- 1985 – Rolando, Portuguese footballer
- 1985 – Andrew Foster, Australian footballer
- 1985 – Mabel Matiz, Turkish singer
- 1985 – Mohammed bin Salman, Crown Prince of Saudi Arabia
- 1986 – Ryan Kelley, American actor
- 1986 – Johnny Wactor, American actor (died 2024)
- 1986 – Blake Wheeler, American ice hockey player
- 1987 – Xavi Annunziata, Spanish footballer
- 1987 – Petros Kravaritis, Greek footballer
- 1987 – Ondřej Pavelec, Czech ice hockey player
- 1988 – Matt Adams, American baseball player
- 1988 – Trent Hodkinson, Australian rugby league player
- 1988 – David Ospina, Colombian footballer
- 1988 – Athena, American wrestler
- 1989 – Dezmon Briscoe, American football player
- 1990 – Tadeja Majerič, Slovenian tennis player
- 1991 – António Félix da Costa, Portuguese race car driver
- 1991 – Cédric Soares, Portuguese footballer
- 1992 – Holly Earl, British actress
- 1992 – Tyler Randell, Australian rugby league player
- 1992 – Ragna Sigurðardóttir, Icelandic politician
- 1992 – Nicolás Tagliafico, Argentine footballer
- 1993 – Pablo Marí, Spanish football player
- 1993 – Ilnur Alshin, Russian football player
- 1993 – Anna Karnaukh, Russian water polo player
- 1994 – Alex Harris, Scottish footballer
- 1994 – Can Aktav, Turkish football player
- 1995 – Brittany Mahomes, American soccer player
- 1996 – Jalen Brunson, American basketball player
- 1997 – Jaylen Barron, American actress
- 1998 – BossMan Dlow, American rapper
- 2000 – Sauce Gardner, American football player
- 2001 – Amanda Anisimova, American tennis player
- 2004 – Jang Won-young, South Korean singer and model

== Deaths ==
=== Pre-1600 ===
- 318 – Liu Cong, emperor of the Xiongnu state
- 577 – John Scholasticus, Byzantine patriarch and saint
- 651 – Aidan of Lindisfarne, Irish bishop and saint
- 731 – Ōtomo no Tabito, Japanese poet (born 665)
- 894 – Ahmad ibn Muhammad al-Ta'i, Muslim governor
- 1054 – Kunigunde of Altdorf, Frankish noblewoman (born c. 1020)
- 1056 – Theodora, Empress of the Byzantine Empire (born 981)
- 1115 – Turgot of Durham (born c. 1050)
- 1158 – Sancho III of Castile (born 1134)
- 1234 – Emperor Go-Horikawa of Japan (born 1212)
- 1287 – Konrad von Würzburg, German poet
- 1324 – Henry II of Jerusalem (born 1271)
- 1372 – Ralph de Stafford, 1st Earl of Stafford, English soldier (born 1301)
- 1422 – Henry V of England (born 1386)
- 1450 – Isabella of Navarre, Countess of Armagnac (born 1395)
- 1502 – Thomas Wode, Lord Chief Justice of the Common Pleas
- 1528 – Matthias Grünewald, German artist (born 1470)

=== 1601–1900 ===
- 1645 – Francesco Bracciolini, Italian poet (born 1566)
- 1654 – Ole Worm, Danish physician and historian (born 1588)
- 1688 – John Bunyan, English preacher, theologian, and author (born 1628)
- 1730 – Gottfried Finger, Czech-German viol player and composer (born 1660)
- 1741 – Johann Gottlieb Heineccius, German academic and jurist (born 1681)
- 1772 – William Borlase, English geologist and historian (born 1695)
- 1795 – François-André Danican Philidor, French-English chess player and composer (born 1726)
- 1799 – Nicolas-Henri Jardin, French architect and academic, designed the Bernstorff Palace and Marienlyst Castle (born 1720)
- 1811 – Louis Antoine de Bougainville, French admiral and explorer (born 1729)
- 1814 – Arthur Phillip, English admiral and politician, 1st Governor of New South Wales (born 1738)
- 1817 – Sir John Duckworth, 1st Baronet, English admiral and politician, 39th Commodore Governor of Newfoundland (born 1747)
- 1818 – Robert Calder, Scottish admiral (born 1745)
- 1858 – Chief Oshkosh, Menominee chief (born 1795)
- 1867 – Charles Baudelaire, French poet and critic (born 1821)
- 1864 – Ferdinand Lassalle, Prussian-German jurist and philosopher (born 1825)
- 1869 – Mary Ward, Irish astronomer and entomologist (born 1827)
- 1884 – Robert Torrens, Irish-Australian politician, 3rd Premier of South Australia (born 1814)

=== 1901–present ===
- 1908 – Leslie Green, English architect (born 1875)
- 1910 – Emīls Dārziņš, Latvian composer, conductor, and music critic (born 1875)
- 1912 – Jean, duc Decazes, French sailor (born 1864)
- 1920 – Wilhelm Wundt, German physician, psychologist, and philosopher (born 1832)
- 1924 – Todor Aleksandrov, Bulgarian soldier (born 1881)
- 1927 – Andranik, Armenian general (born 1865)
- 1937 – Ruth Baldwin, British socialite (born 1905)
- 1940 – Georges Gauthier, Canadian archbishop (born 1871)
- 1940 – DeLancey W. Gill, American painter (born 1859)
- 1941 – Thomas Bavin, New Zealand-Australian politician, 24th Premier of New South Wales (born 1874)
- 1941 – Marina Tsvetaeva, Russian poet and author (born 1892)
- 1945 – Stefan Banach, Polish mathematician (born 1892)
- 1948 – Andrei Zhdanov, Russian civil servant and politician (born 1896)
- 1951 – Paul Demel, Czech actor (born 1903)
- 1952 – Henri Bourassa, Canadian publisher and politician (born 1868)
- 1954 – Elsa Barker, American author and poet (born 1869)
- 1963 – Georges Braque, French painter and sculptor (born 1882)
- 1965 – E. E. Smith, American engineer and author (born 1890)
- 1967 – Ilya Ehrenburg, Russian journalist and author (born 1891)
- 1968 – John Hartle, English motorcycle racer (born 1933)
- 1969 – Rocky Marciano, American boxer (born 1923)
- 1973 – John Ford, American actor, director, producer, and screenwriter (born 1894)
- 1974 – William Pershing Benedict, American soldier and pilot (born 1918)
- 1974 – Norman Kirk, New Zealand engineer and politician, 29th Prime Minister of New Zealand (born 1923)
- 1978 – John Wrathall, Rhodesian accountant and politician, 2nd President of Rhodesia (born 1913)
- 1979 – Sally Rand, American actress and dancer (born 1904)
- 1979 – Tiger Smith, English cricketer and coach (born 1886)
- 1984 – Audrey Wagner, American baseball player, obstetrician, and gynecologist (born 1927)
- 1985 – Frank Macfarlane Burnet, Australian virologist and academic, Nobel Prize laureate (born 1899)
- 1986 – Elizabeth Coatsworth, American author and poet (born 1893)
- 1986 – Urho Kekkonen, Finnish journalist, lawyer, and politician, 8th President of Finland (born 1900)
- 1986 – Henry Moore, English sculptor and illustrator (born 1898)
- 1990 – Nathaniel Clifton, American basketball player and coach (born 1922)
- 1991 – Cliff Lumsdon, Canadian swimmer and coach (born 1931)
- 1997 – Diana, Princess of Wales (born 1961)
- 1997 – Dodi Fayed, Egyptian film producer (born 1955)
- 2000 – Lucille Fletcher, American screenwriter (born 1912)
- 2000 – Dolores Moore, American baseball player and educator (born 1932)
- 2002 – Lionel Hampton, American pianist, composer, and bandleader (born 1908)
- 2002 – Farhad Mehrad, Persian singer-songwriter, guitarist, and pianist (born 1944)
- 2002 – George Porter, English chemist and academic, Nobel Prize laureate (born 1920)
- 2005 – Joseph Rotblat, Polish-English physicist and academic, Nobel Prize laureate (born 1908)
- 2006 – Mohamed Abdelwahab, Egyptian footballer (born 1983)
- 2006 – Tom Delaney, English race car driver and businessman (born 1911)
- 2007 – Gay Brewer, American golfer (born 1932)
- 2007 – Jean Jacques Paradis, Canadian general (born 1928)
- 2007 – Sulev Vahtre, Estonian historian and academic (born 1926)
- 2008 – Ken Campbell, English actor and screenwriter (born 1941)
- 2008 – Ike Pappas, American journalist (born 1933)
- 2008 – Victor Yates, New Zealand rugby player (born 1939)
- 2009 – Eraño Manalo, Filipino religious minister and Executive Minister of the Iglesia ni Cristo (born 1925)
- 2010 – Laurent Fignon, French cyclist (born 1960)
- 2011 – Wade Belak, Canadian ice hockey player (born 1976)
- 2012 – Max Bygraves, English actor (born 1922)
- 2012 – Joe Lewis, American martial artist and actor (born 1944)
- 2012 – Carlo Maria Martini, Italian cardinal (born 1927)
- 2012 – Kashiram Rana, Indian lawyer and politician (born 1938)
- 2012 – John C. Shabaz, American judge and politician (born 1931)
- 2012 – Sergey Sokolov, Russian commander and politician, 6th Minister of Defence for The Soviet Union (born 1911)
- 2013 – Alan Carrington, English chemist and academic (born 1934)
- 2013 – David Frost, English journalist and game show host (born 1939)
- 2013 – Jimmy Greenhalgh, English footballer and manager (born 1923)
- 2013 – Jan Camiel Willems, Belgian mathematician and theorist (born 1939)
- 2014 – Bapu, Indian director and screenwriter (born 1933)
- 2014 – Ștefan Andrei, Romanian politician, 87th Romanian Minister of Foreign Affairs (born 1931)
- 2014 – Stan Goldberg, American illustrator (born 1932)
- 2014 – Carol Vadnais, Canadian ice hockey player and coach (born 1945)
- 2015 – Edward Douglas-Scott-Montagu, 3rd Baron Montagu of Beaulieu, English politician, founded the National Motor Museum (born 1926)
- 2015 – Tom Scott, American football player (born 1930)
- 2018 – Carole Shelley, British-American actress (born 1939)
- 2019 – Anthoine Hubert, French race car driver (born 1996)
- 2019 – Alec Holowka, Canadian game developer (born 1983)
- 2020 – Pranab Mukherjee, Former President of India (born 1935)
- 2020 – Tom Seaver, American baseball player (born 1944)
- 2021 – Mahal, Filipino comedian and actress (born 1974)
- 2021 – Francesco Morini, Italian footballer (born 1944)
- 2021 – Michael Constantine, Greek-American actor (born 1927)
- 2021 – Geronimo, British alpaca (born 2013)
- 2023 – Silvina Luna, Argentine model and actress (born 1980)
- 2024 – Sol Bamba, Ivorian-French footballer (born 1985)

== Holidays and observances ==
- Baloch-Pakhtun Unity Day (Balochs and Pashtuns, International observance)
- Christian feast day:
  - Aidan of Lindisfarne
  - Aristides of Athens
  - Cuthburh
  - Joseph of Arimathea
  - Nicodemus
  - Paulinus of Trier
  - Raymond Nonnatus
  - Wala of Corbie
  - August 31 (Eastern Orthodox liturgics)
- Day of Solidarity and Freedom (Poland)
- Departure Day, celebrates the withdrawal of American troops from Afghanistan
- Independence Day, celebrates the independence of Kyrgyzstan from the Soviet Union in 1991.
- Independence Day, celebrates the independence of Malaya from the United Kingdom in 1957.
- Independence Day, celebrates the independence of Trinidad and Tobago from the United Kingdom in 1962.
- Romanian Language Day (Romania, Moldova, Ukraine)
- Sabah Day (Sabah, Borneo)
