= Zé Lucas =

Zé Lucas is a Portuguese form of the given name José Lucas. Notable people with the name include:

- Zé Lucas (footballer, born 1994), Brazilian football forward
- Zé Lucas (footballer, born 2008), Brazilian football midfielder
