= Agios Thomas, Boeotia =

Agios Thomas Άγιος Θωμάς
- Community
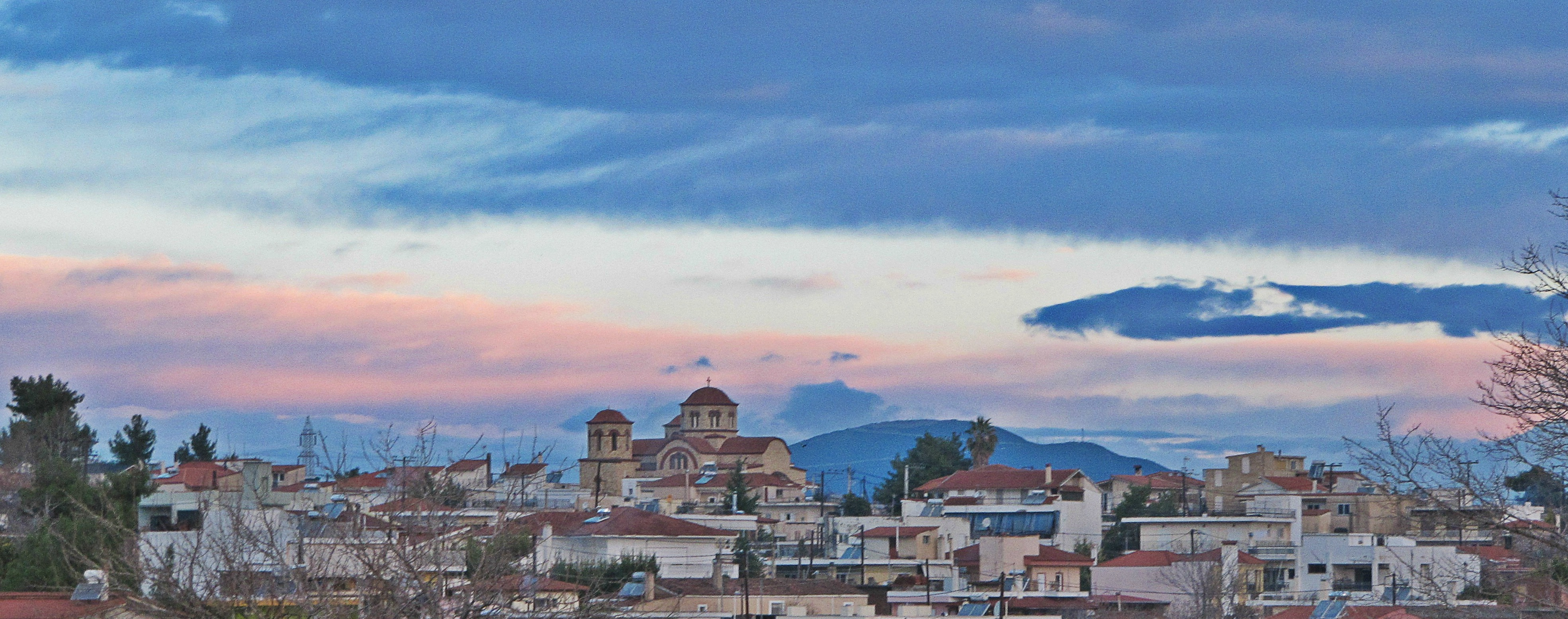

- Location within Greece
- Coordinates: 38°16′39″N 23°35′16″E
- Country: Greece
- Administrative region: Central Greece
- Regional unit: Boeotia
- Municipality: Tanagra
- Municipal unit: Oinofyta

Area
  - Community: 39.262 km^{2} (15.159 sq mi)
- Elevation: 240 m (790 ft)

Population (2021)
  - Community: 1,131
  - Density: 28.81/km^{2} (74.61/sq mi)
- Time zone: UTC+2 (EET)
  - Summer (DST): UTC+3 (EEST)
- Postal code: 320 09
- Area code: 22620
- Vehicle registration: ΒΙ

Agios Thomas (Greek: Άγιος Θωμάς, before 1929: Λιάτανη - Liatani) is a village in Boeotia, Greece. It is a community of Tanagra municipality, near Athens. The community has an area of 39.262 km^{2}.

== Infrastructure ==
Community holds a 6-year primary school, 2 kindergartens, open care center for the elderly, regional clinic, private dentistry and pharmacy. The central orthodox temple is dedicated to the Nativity of Mary (Genession of Theotokos), while Saint Thomas is the Patron Saint of the village

== Name ==
Liatani was the name before 1929. Several theories exist for its etymology:

- Without being documented, it is said that the first resident of the district was a wealthy land owner, named Liatis.
- A 2nd approach is that the name came from the arbanetic expression: " leaita nie" (kill someone), which was used by the soldiers at the revolution of 1821.
- The period that Hellas was under Ottoman occupation, arbanitic liapedes went out the district, the village took the name: Liatani.(Liapedes-Liapani-Liatani).
- Mavromati is another name, that George Syrmas (90 years old) in 1967 insist on, due to plethora of olive trees, around the village. Source: Folklore Collection of Athens University. (Eftihea Syrma 1967).

The name: Mavromati is mentioned in the book of Colonel William Martin Leake: Travels in Northern Greece, during his visit to the region in 1806. Also the prefect of Thebes, N. Karoris at his report: 'Ekthesis incident, raising the month of April during the 1830' on the conflict with the Turks to lands on 19 June 1833, records the name or Liatani or Mavromati village of Livadia . (Liatani was under the jurisdiction of the province Livadias). Source: Unpublished Documents relating to the final deliberation of the land in eastern Greece. Elias Papathanassopoulos.

== Economy ==
Inhabitants of the village were mainly engaged in agriculture and livestock farming since its establishment. Of course, supportive professions, such as blacksmiths, pedals, kitchen utensils, grocers on a scale proportional to the population, are not missing. Since the 1960s, when the Asopos basin is becoming industrialized, many young people are turning to industrial work, where they are mostly employed today. The main production of agricultural products is olive oil from the olive groves of the village, as edible roots such as potatoes and carrots. In recent years, new crops have also been tested: cotton, tobacco and pomegranates

== Population ==
Historical population

Year	Pop.	±%
1834	329	—
1851	471	+43.2%
1907	1,071	+127.4%
1928	1,180	+10.2%
1940	1,377	+16.7%
1951	1,287	−6.5%
1961	1,222	−5.1%

Year	Pop.	±%
1971	1,183	−3.2%
1981	1,398	+18.2%
1991	1,628	+16.5%
2001	1,425	−12.5%
2011	1,292	−9.3%
2021	1,131	−12.5%

== Sights ==
- hill with necropolis of ancient Tanagras.
- Agios Thomas chapel at Asopus river, του 12th ce.
- Cave with the wreath and Liataniotisa Chapel at cave's park
- Prophet Helias Chapel and Big Well.
- Saint George chapel
- Monastery of Analepsis.
- Monastery of Beloved Mother at Kleidi.

== Climate ==
Climate data for National Observatory of Athens (Thiseio), 107 m asl (1971-2000),(1961-1990)rain
Month	Jan	Feb	Mar	Apr	May	Jun	Jul	Aug	Sep	Oct	Nov	Dec	Year
Mean daily maximum °C (°F)	11.6 (52.9)	12.7 (54.9)	14.4 (57.9)	19.3 (66.7)	24.1 (75.4)	28.9 (84.0)	32.1 (89.8)	31.9 (89.4)	27.8 (82.0)	22.4 (72.3)	17.3 (63.1)	13.3 (55.9)	21.3 (70.4)
Mean daily minimum °C (°F)	4.9 (40.8)	5.3 (41.5)	6.5 (43.7)	9.9 (49.8)	14.1 (57.4)	18.2 (64.8)	21 (70)	20.9 (69.6)	17.5 (63.5)	13.7 (56.7)	10.2 (50.4)	6.8 (44.2)	12.4 (54.4)
Average precipitation mm (inches)	68 (2.7)	59 (2.3)	57 (2.2)	33 (1.3)	25 (1.0)	15 (0.6)	7 (0.3)	8 (0.3)	19 (0.7)	59 (2.3)	66 (2.6)	84 (3.3)	500 (19.6)
Source: The climate data agency

== History ==
=== Byzantine Era ===
By the 8th century AD the Eastern Roman Empire, based at Constantinople, had reconquered the Greek countryside from the Slavs, including Boeotia, and this ushered in a period of steady growth of rural population and at the major regional towns (such as Thebes in Central Boeotia). We can match this picture from Byzantine sources with the results of our rural survey around Tanagra a whole series of small villages or hamlets was established at regular intervals of every few kilometres, datable by characteristic Middle Byzantine ceramics found on their surface to foundations in the 10th−11th centuries AD. These continue to flourish into the next period of Crusader feudal conquest of our region (13th−14th century). The advantageous location of ancient Tanagra City explains the fact that one such village is founded only a kilometre from the ancient town, by the rural church still standing from that village of Agios Thomas. The church is Middle Byzantine of 12th century AD date, whilst the associated village which we discovered from widespread surface pottery in the fields left of the church, was occupied from the 11th−14th centuries AD (A. Vionis, Leiden). All the Byzantine villages disappear in the 14th century, and this can be related to the return of the Bubonic Plague and to the devastating wars between the Franks, the Byzantines and the Turks which left most of the southern Mainland of Greece cleared of population, which either retreated to upland villages in each region or was carried off into slavery.

=== Ottoman Era ===
The first village tax records for Boeotia, in 1466, shortly after the Ottoman Turkish conquest of Greece, show vividly this absence of Greek settlements in the Lowlands and a small number of enlarged refuge villages in the hills of Boeotia. Eastern Boeotia with the large plains and plateaus around Tanagra is especially empty. To recolonise this landscape between 1400−1500 AD the final Frankish Dukes of Athens and then the Ottoman rulers invited large numbers of new settlers, from Albania, with the specific direction to locate new villages near abandoned ones from the previous settlement system. This is the origin of our modern villages at Tanagra (former Bratsi) and at Kleidi (Kleideti). After some 100 years of Ottoman rule, the peaceful conditions of the Pax Ottomanic saw population rise for both Greek and Albanian villages, as well as new village foundations. The Ottoman village tax record for 1570 shows this well. Modern Ayios Thomas has a more complex history; it is rather recent, and was founded by villagers moving out of the mountains between Boeotia and Attica at the end of the Turkish era and after the War of Greek Independence, in the early 19th century AD. Before Thomas though a village existed at its own site, called Kelmendi or Liatani, and further south a small linked pair of hamlets called Kinos or Ginosati, now deserted.

=== Liatani in Ottoman Occupation Era ===
As all Greek villages, Liatani fought against occupiers on the side of Captain Athanasios Skourtaniotis. He was born in 1793 at Skourta village (Dervenohoria). Dervenohoria enjoyed little autonomy and retained a small body of men combatants led by Skourtaniotis. He managed many defeats against the Ottomans of the area. His real name was Gatsis, but known as Captain Thanases. Officer Ioannis Kiokes from Liatani fought on the side of Skourtnaniotis. He honored by medal of cross and generosity from our country. He participated also, at the battle of Arachova, under chief Georgios Karaiskakis. He died in Liatani. He was granted the rank of 2nd lieutenant by Royal Decree of 20 May 1838, as a reward for the struggle of independence and his offer during the plague in Poros island. Ioannis Koubitsas is another officer of Skourtaniotis from Liatani. He was renowned for wisdom and courage. He served under the command of Gardikiotis at Jamalas Papakostas's insurgency in 1848, at Palaiokastro of Phthiotis and killed in a clash between government troops and rebels.

=== Ηistorical Τimeline ===
- 1821. -July. Pasha Omer Vryonis from Eboea came in Liatani with 3000 men to help the Turks in Athens, where they had run out of food. Liatani was 9 hours away from Athens. 700 Athenians were resisting, but finally went backwards. On 20 July Omer Vryonis conquers Athens.

Michalis Economou in the files of Greek History says: Vryonis passed byAulis and Tanagra to support the Turks besieged the Acropolis. On June 17 overnights in Liatani and attacks the body of Vasilis Chatzimeletis, which had arrived in the village to ward off the invasion of Athens. The same issue mentioned Capt. John E. Nouchakes by moving the date to July 29, 1821.

- 1827. -January. Vassos Mavrovouniotis heads from Hasia to Boeotia and fights in Liatani against Ottoman army corps that came to aid Kioutachis. He manages to defeat them and delay the supply of Athens
- 1832. -6(18 former calendae) December. Residents of Ayios Thomas, following Thebes's county residents, undersigned the landowners complain to the competent authorities and the entire enlightened world to an unacceptable action by the Ottoman inhabitants of Euboea to sell out national land to foreign investors. Source: General Archives, Historical file of Mr. Athanasios Kyriakos, former secretary of Kleidi's Community.
- 1835. -8 April. Formed by royal decree the Municipality of Tanagra at Thebes Province, having capital the village Liatais. The decree was not published in the Government Gazette. Ranked in third class with a population of 1287 inhabitants, and the initial establishment:( Liatais: 324, bratsi: 122, Schimatari: 280, Inia: 61, Kakosalesi: 327, Bouga: 39, Koloteti: 129).
- 1903. -29 March. Female school is established in Liatani. Published by royal decree GG: 54/1903
- 1912. -31 August. Establishment of community, located in the settlement Liatani at prefecture of Attica and Boeotia. Gov. 262A - 31 August 1912.
- 1914. -4 October. Strong earthquake which was felt throughout the province, removes most of the houses in the village. Community president: Aristides Papaconstantinou and the police officer: Andreas Aggelakopoulos accused by the villagers for discriminatory allocation of state aid.
- 1921. -9 October. Corporals Stephanos John Papageorgiou and Theodorou S.I. included in the names of the piers of the XIII division in battles of Sagarious, announced the press office of the Greek government.
- 1929. -30 April. Alteration of the toponymic Liatani in hitherto known: Ayios Thomas.
- 1941. -19 February. Corporal Paul Spyridon Georgiadis killed in the battle of Pestanis. He belonged to the 34th Infantry Regiment. Born in Ayios Thomas Thebes in 1918.
- 1941. -7 March. Soldier Papadedes Christou Evangelos killed in Metzgkorani Tepeleniou . He belonged to the 67th Infantry Regiment. Born in Ayios Thomas Thebes in 1913.
- 1941. -20 May. Soldier Kokosis Michael Dimitris killed in the Battle of Crete, Skine Chania. He belonged to the 7th center of prisoners. Born in Ayios Thomas Thebes in 1906.
- 1942. -11 February. Aris Velouchiotis leaves in Liatani part of his soldiers under the commands of Tzavelas. Velouchitis with Orestes, Pelopidas, Leondas and Gardikiotis drive to the Fili Monastery(Xasia). There they dressed with priest clothes(rasa). Having their weapons hidden beneath the rasa, go down to Athens (Hadjipanayiotou, 1982).
- 1942. -16 July. WO John Georgiadis killed on 16 July 1942, arranged in service (mission bombing), near the airport ETKOY Egypt by aircraft Hurricane.
- 1943. -26 July. The community belongs to the prefecture of Viotia, after separation of the prefecture Attikovoiotias. GG: 223A/26-7-1943.
- 1944. -14 February. Doctor Constantine D. Papadedes, 42 years old is slaughtered by anarchists - communists.
- 1944. -20 July. Villagers: Aekaterinis Ioannis, Vougesis Demetrios, Gikas Athanasios and Hronis Aristides are arrested by Germans and held at Avlona's garrison headquarters.
- 1944. -26 July. The village burnt by Germans
- 1945. -5 December. The settlement Liatani is considered municipal department of Tanagra's Municipality with the law 25/5-12-1945
- 1963. -11 May. Tragic plant explosion(ELVIEMEK factory) kills 4 attendants from the village: Kava Evangelia A. 17, Kotsoliou P. Catherine 21, Kotsoliou Theofani P. 16, Sterpi Constantinna 18.
- 1997. -4 December. The community is repealed and consolidated with Dilesi, Kleidi and Oinofyta in one Municipality.
- 2010. -6 June. The community is consolidated at Tanagra Municipality with the name Local Community of Agios Thomas.
- 2020. -12 March. The community is designated a "martyr village" by Presidential Decree.

== Gallery ==
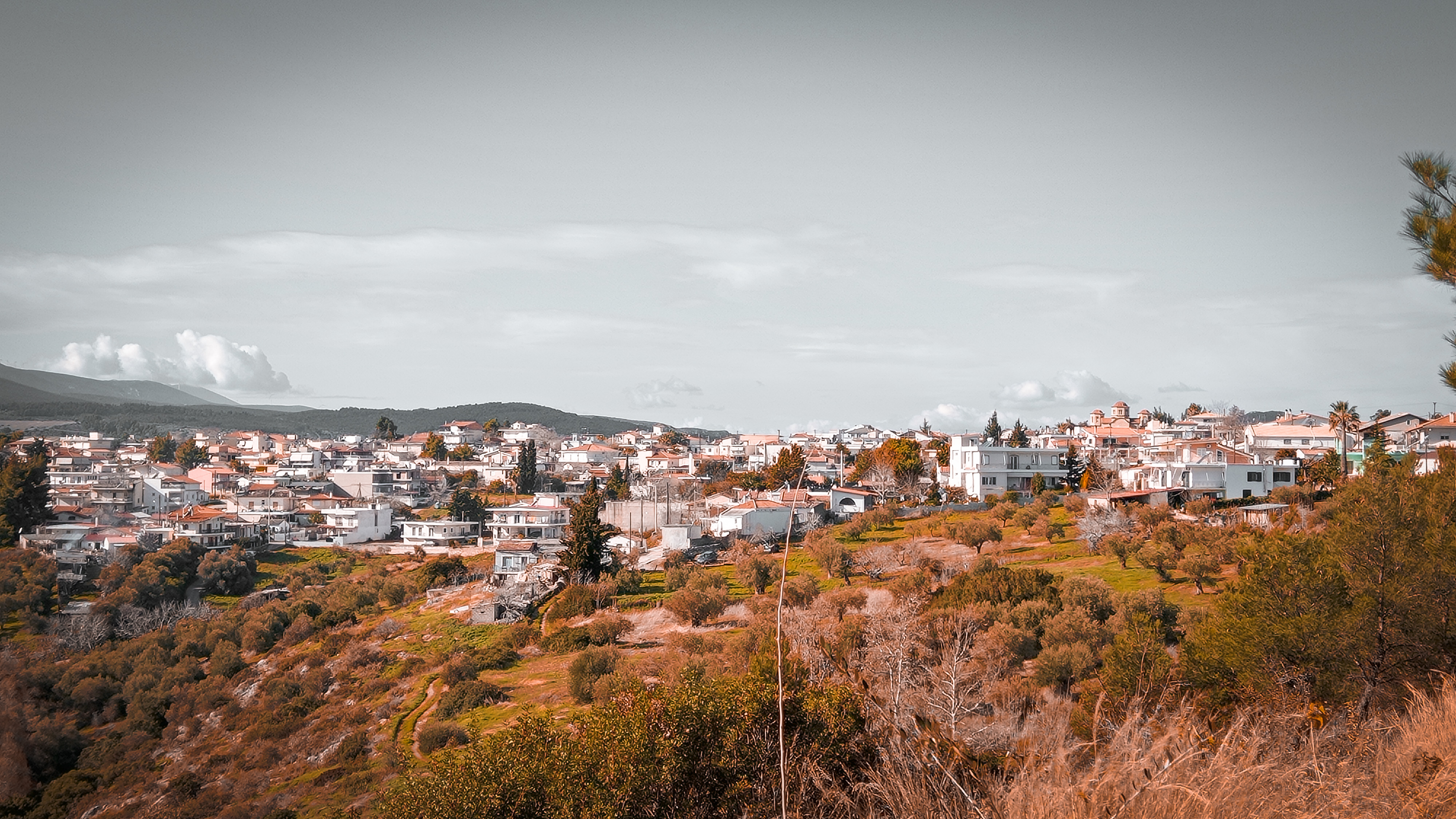
Agios Thomas: View from cave's park

Cave with the wreath

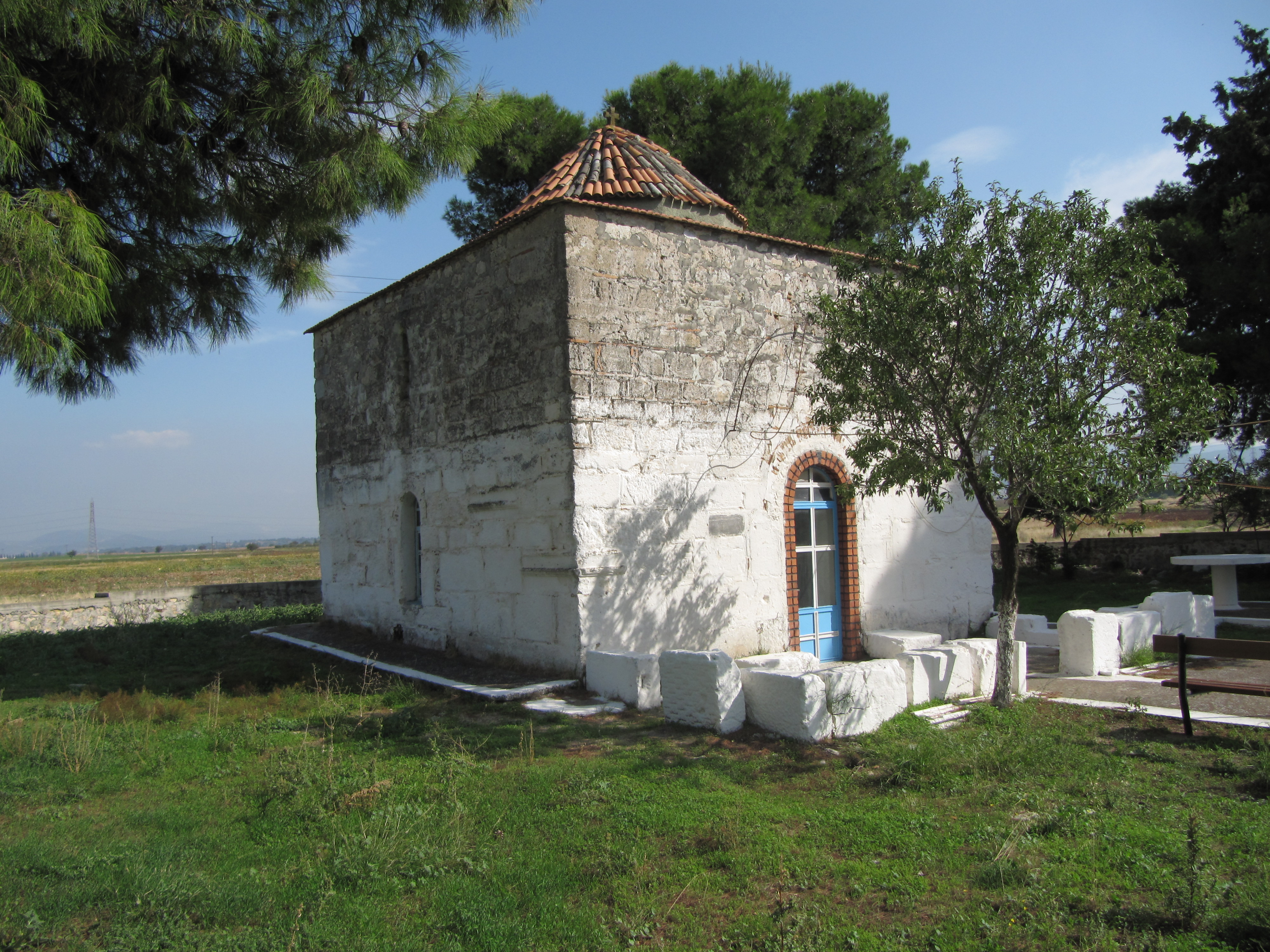
Ayios Thomas chapel

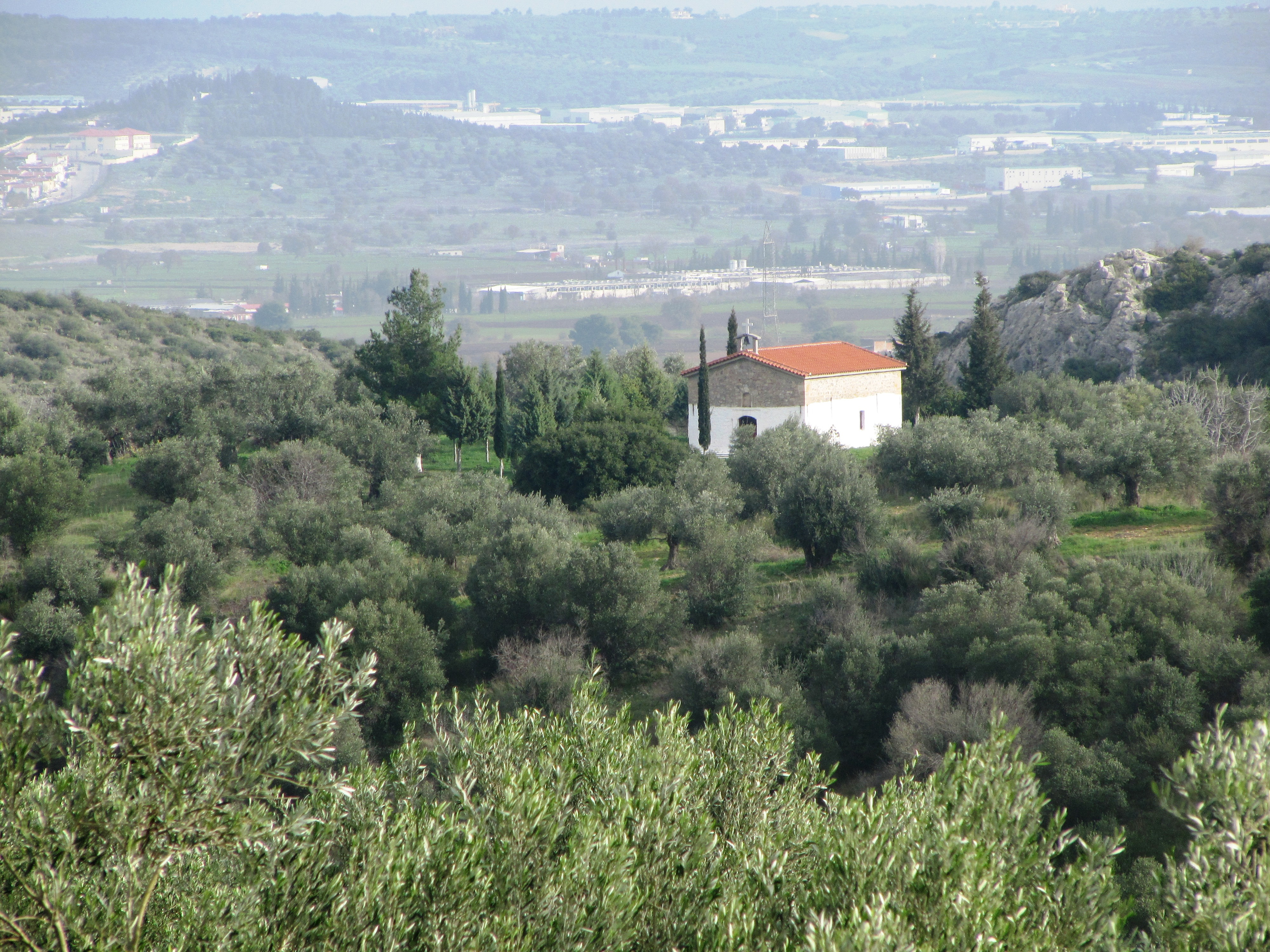
Prophet Helias chapel

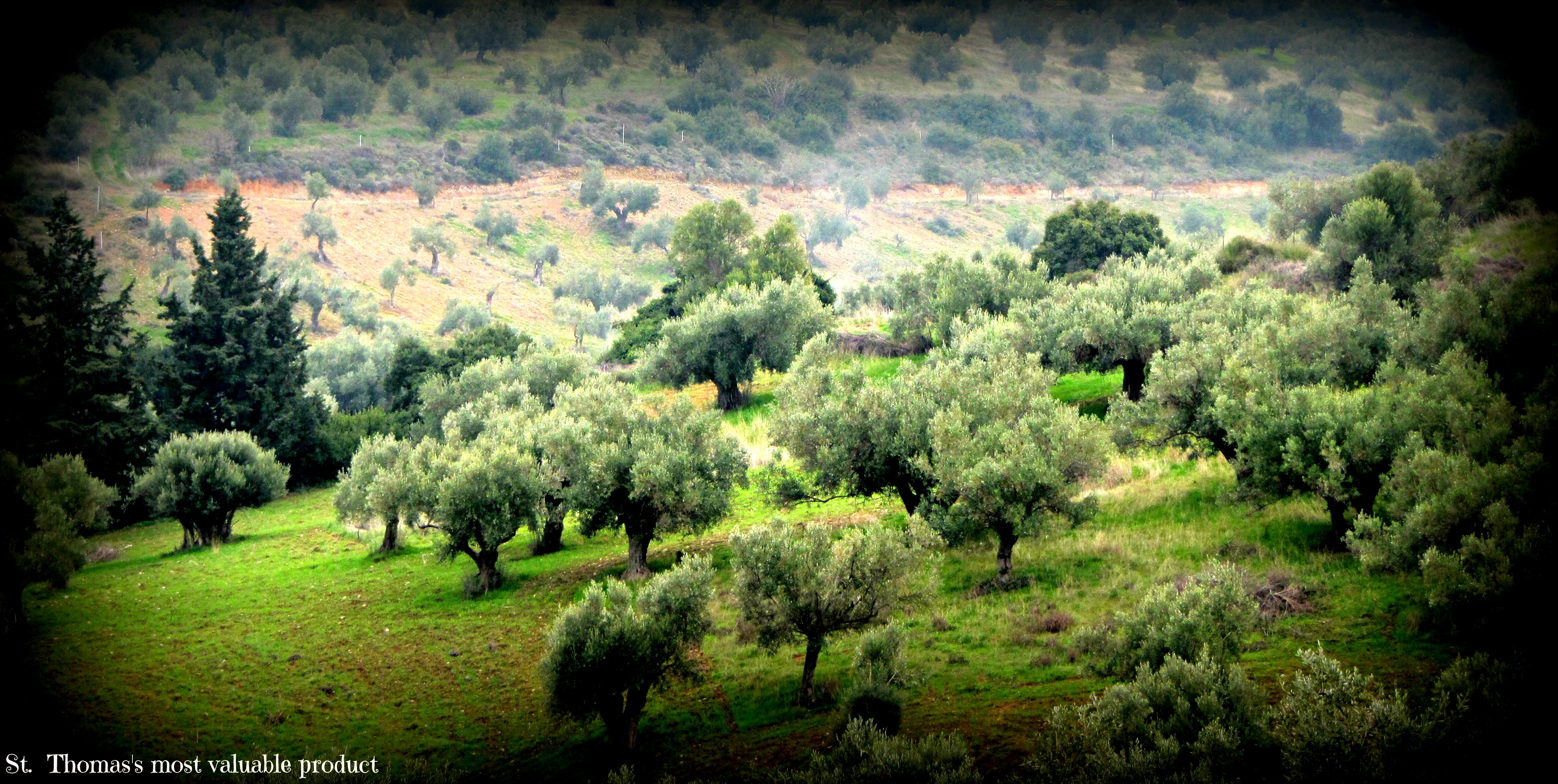
Olive trees: the most valuable product of Agios Thomas in Tanagra

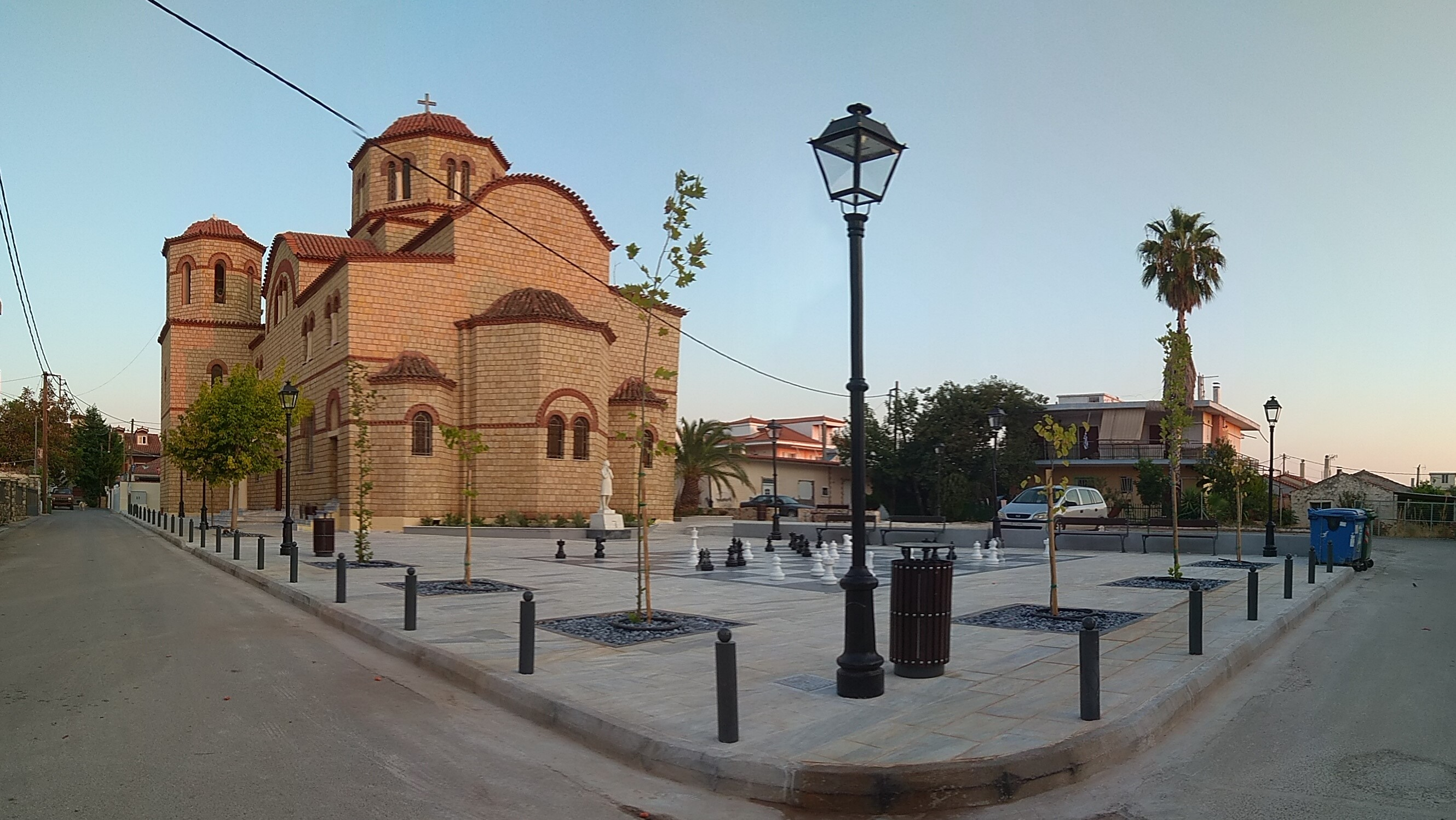
Heroes Square at Agios Thomas Tanagras

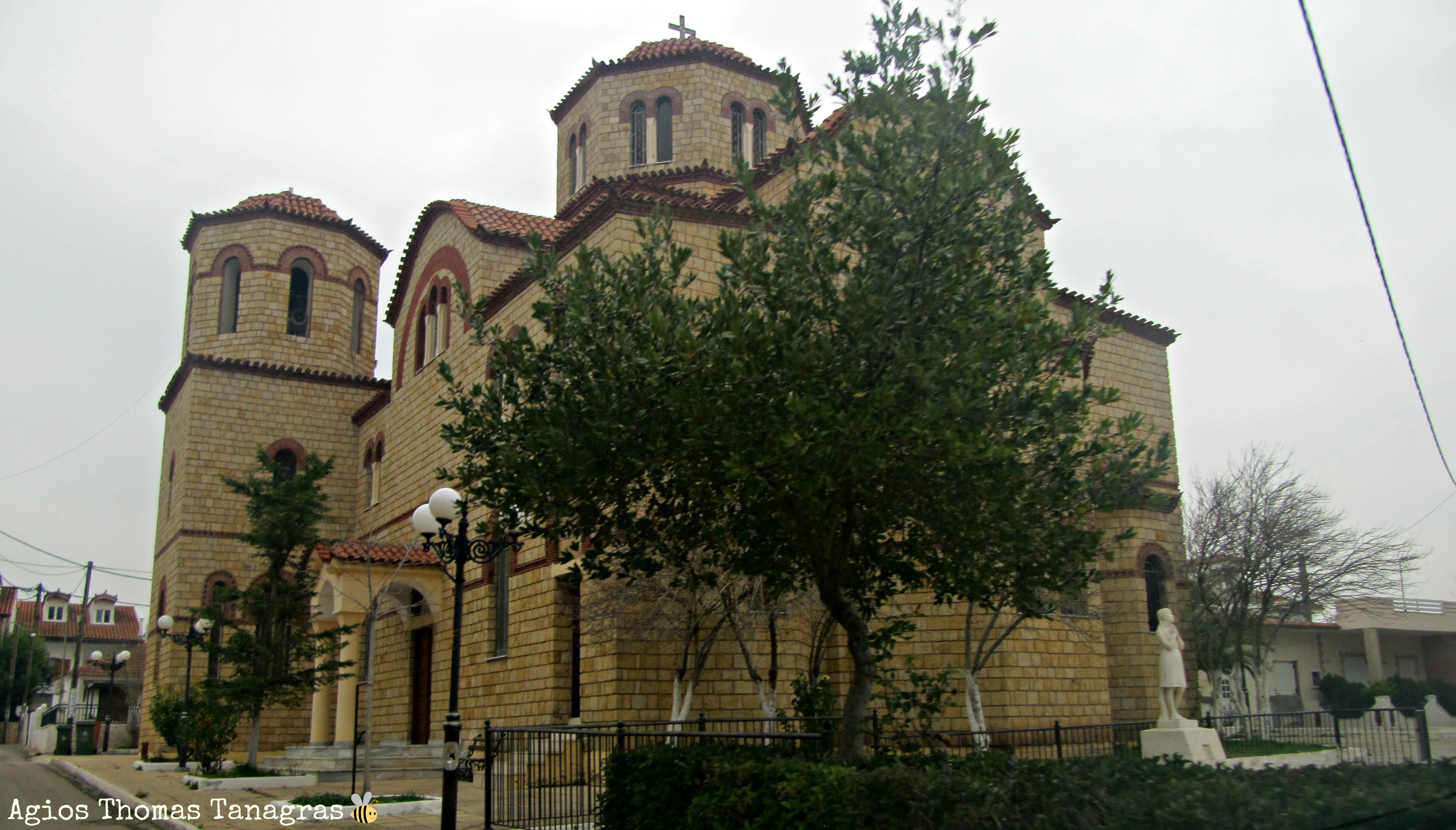
Nativity of Holy Mary church

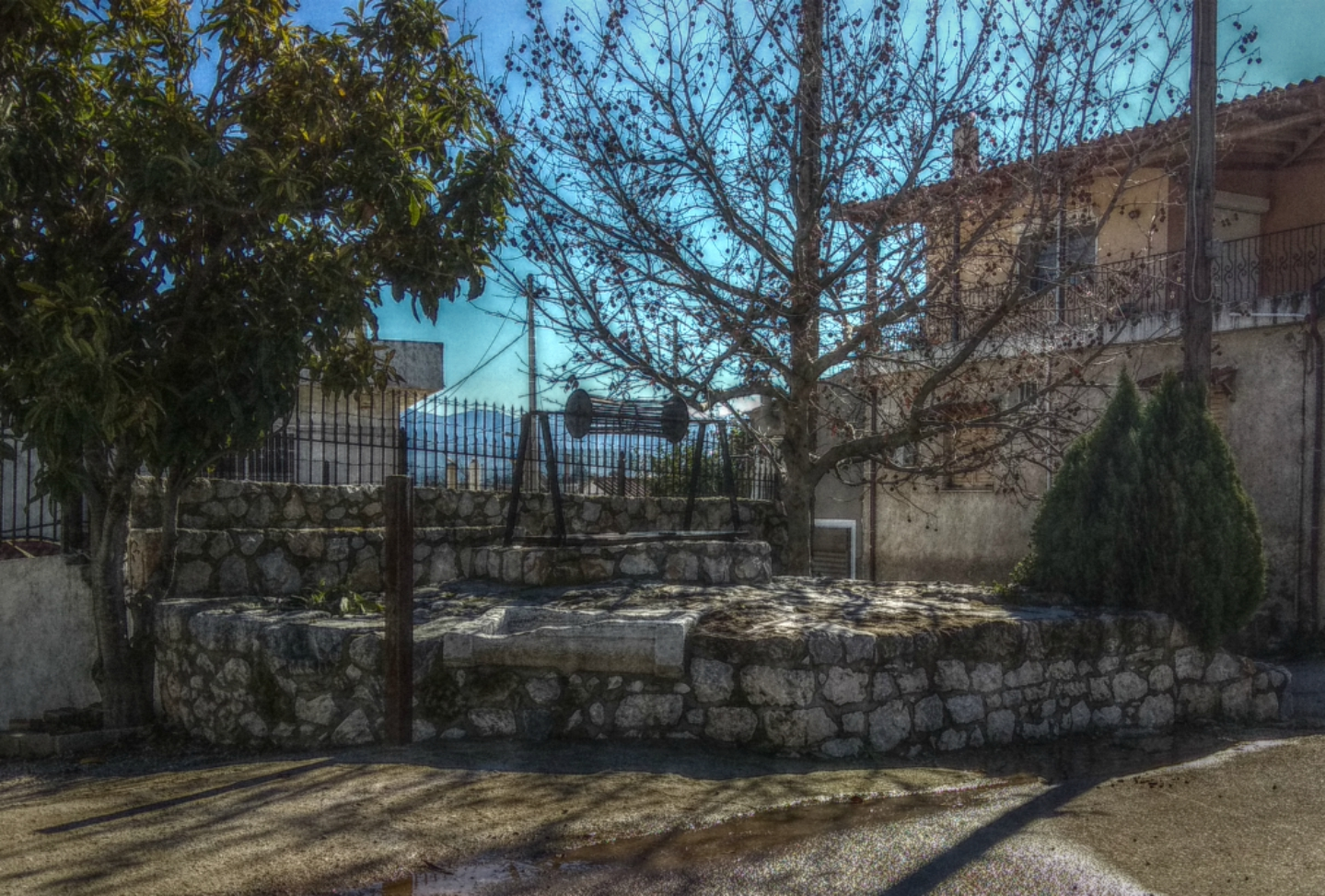
BigWell - pousiliki

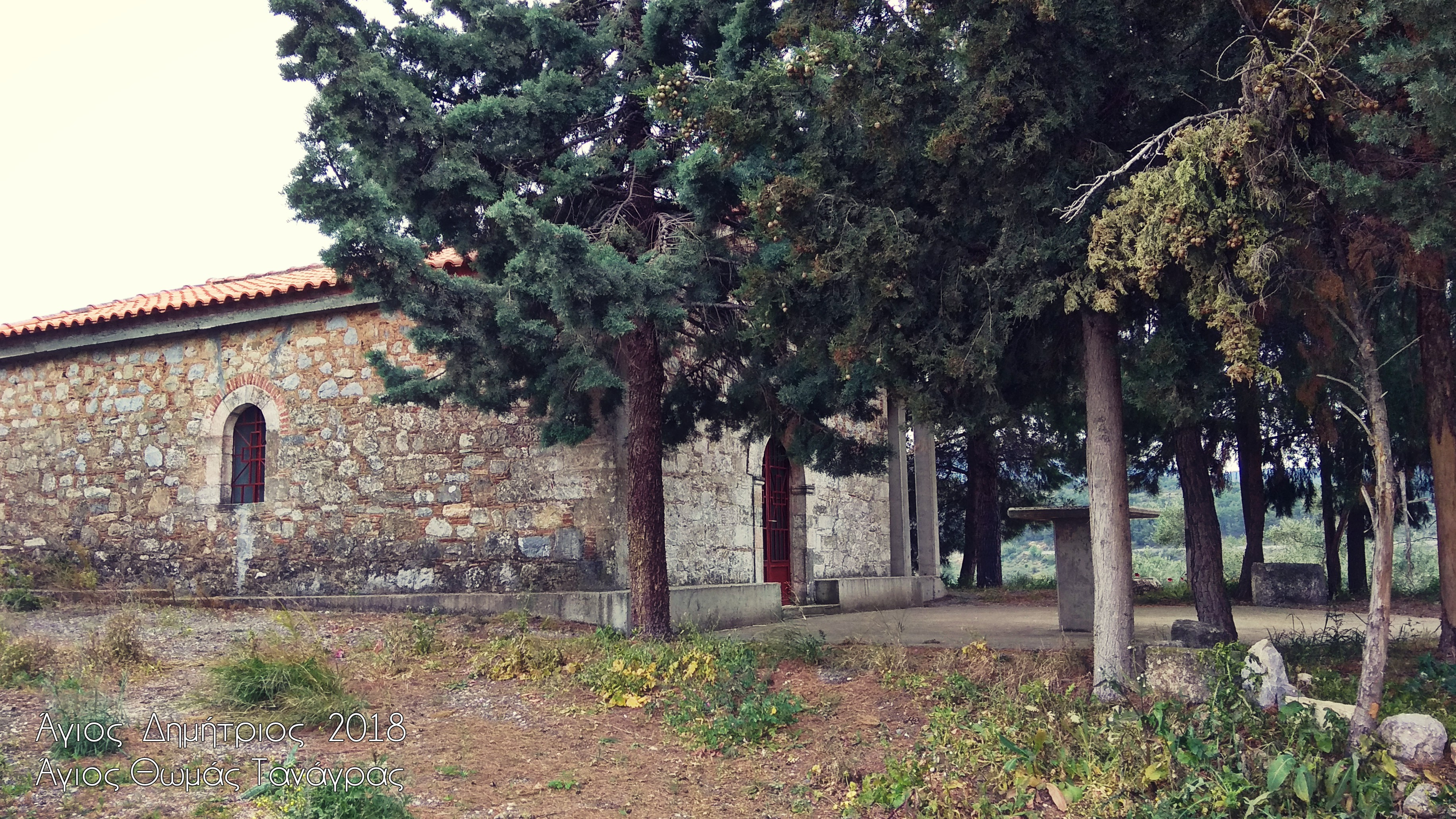
Saint Demetrios Chapel

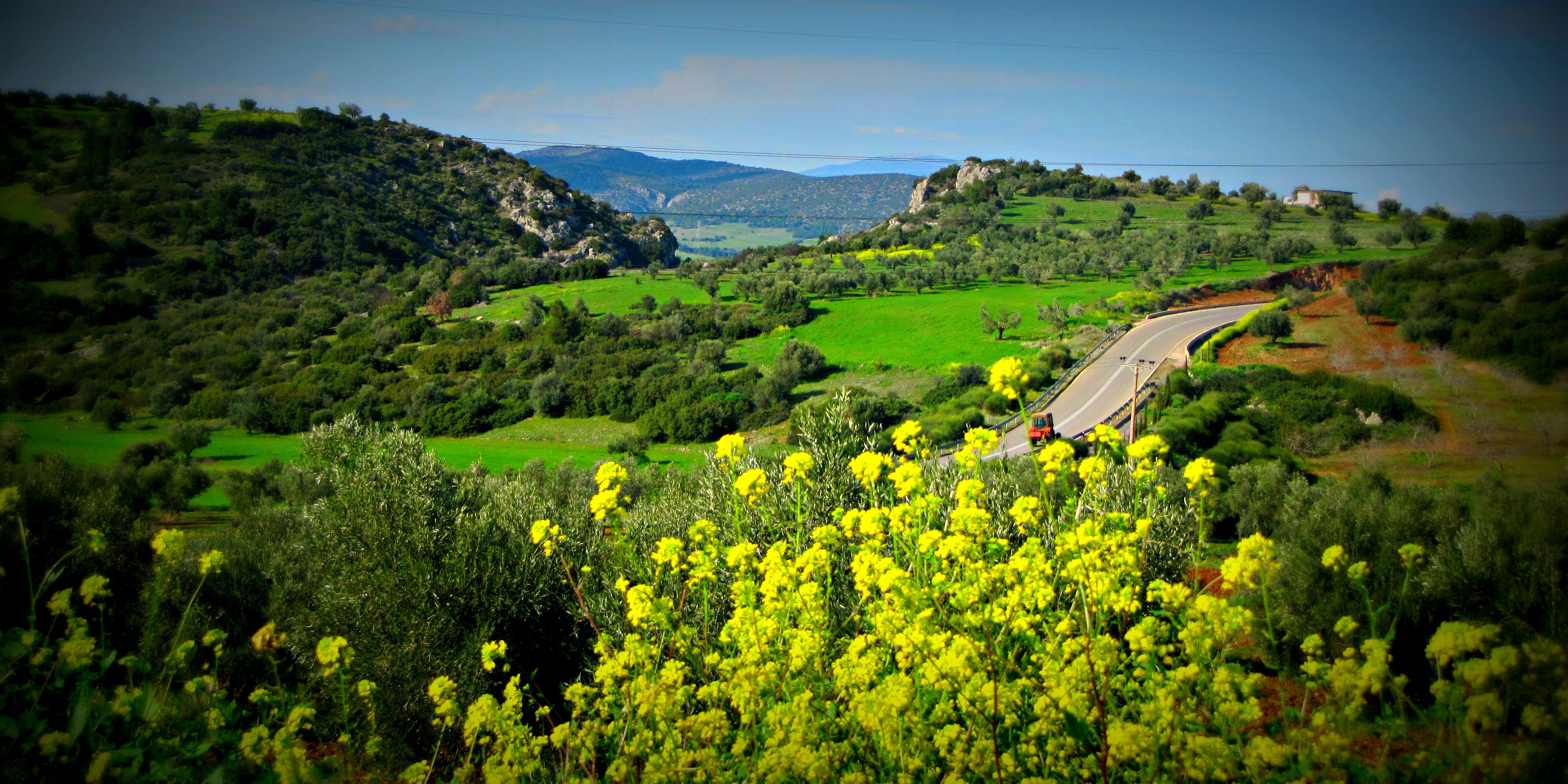
Stream of Bithsiakouli

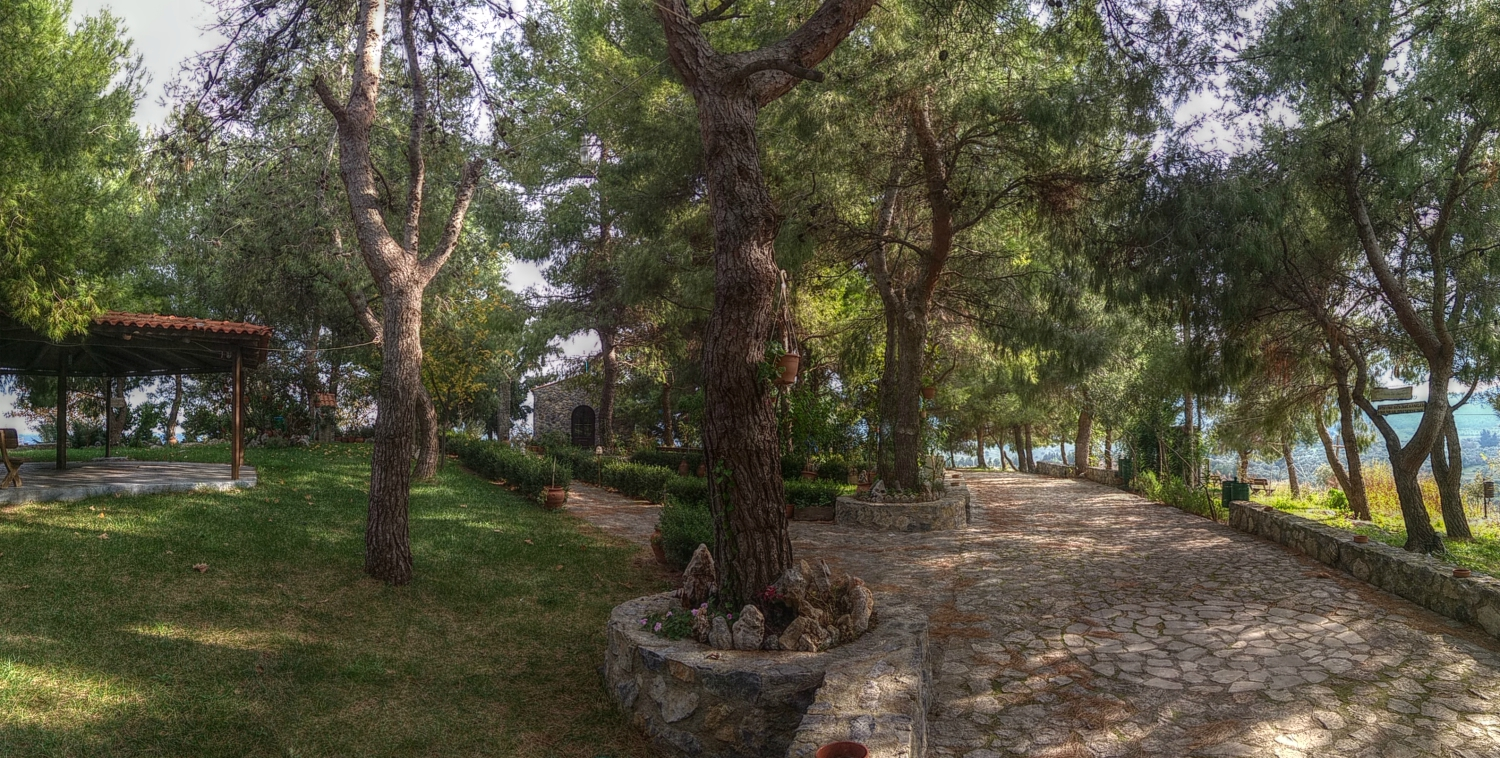
Cave's park with Liataniotissa chapel at Agios Thomas Tanagras

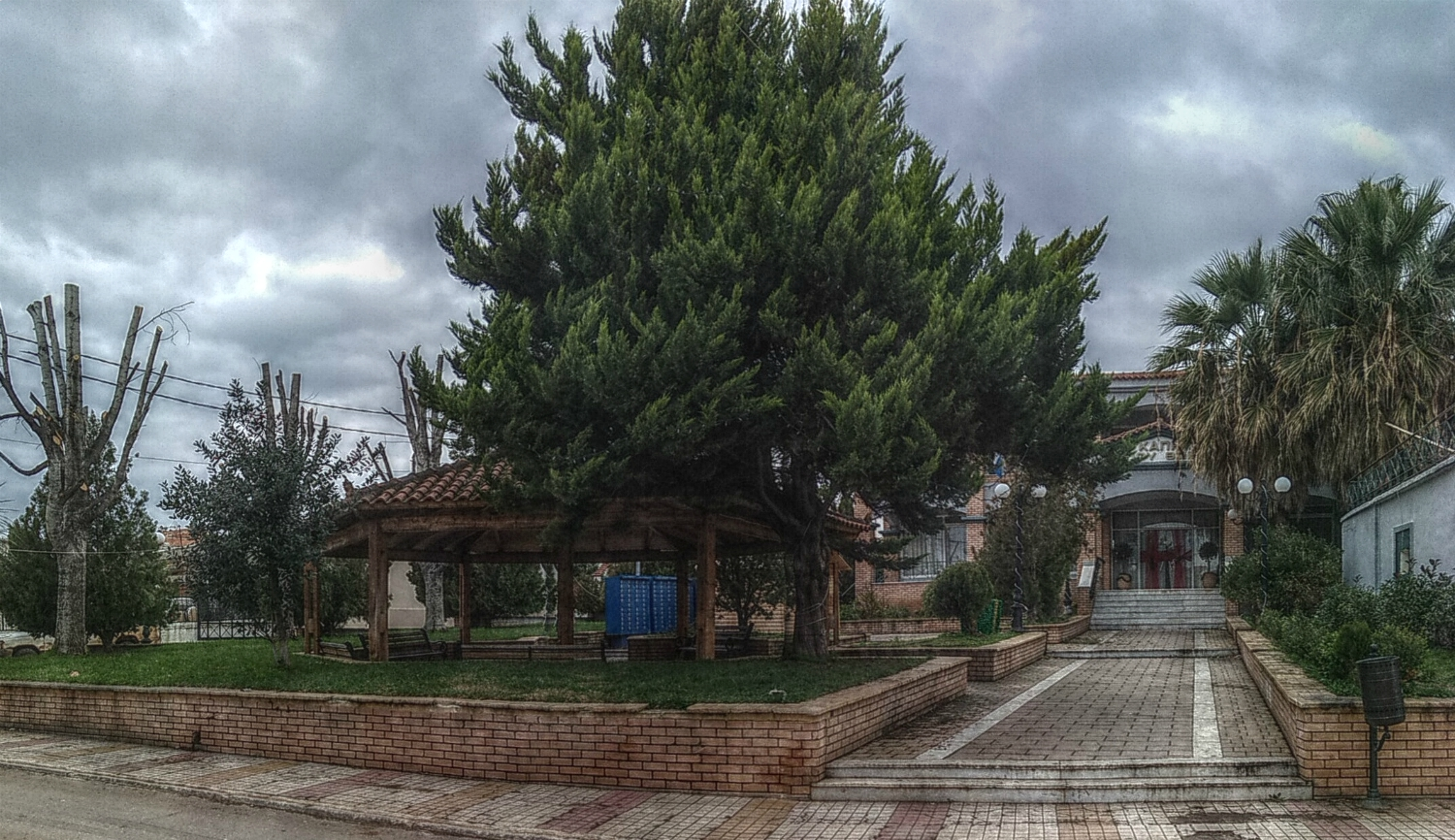
Open Care Center for the elderly

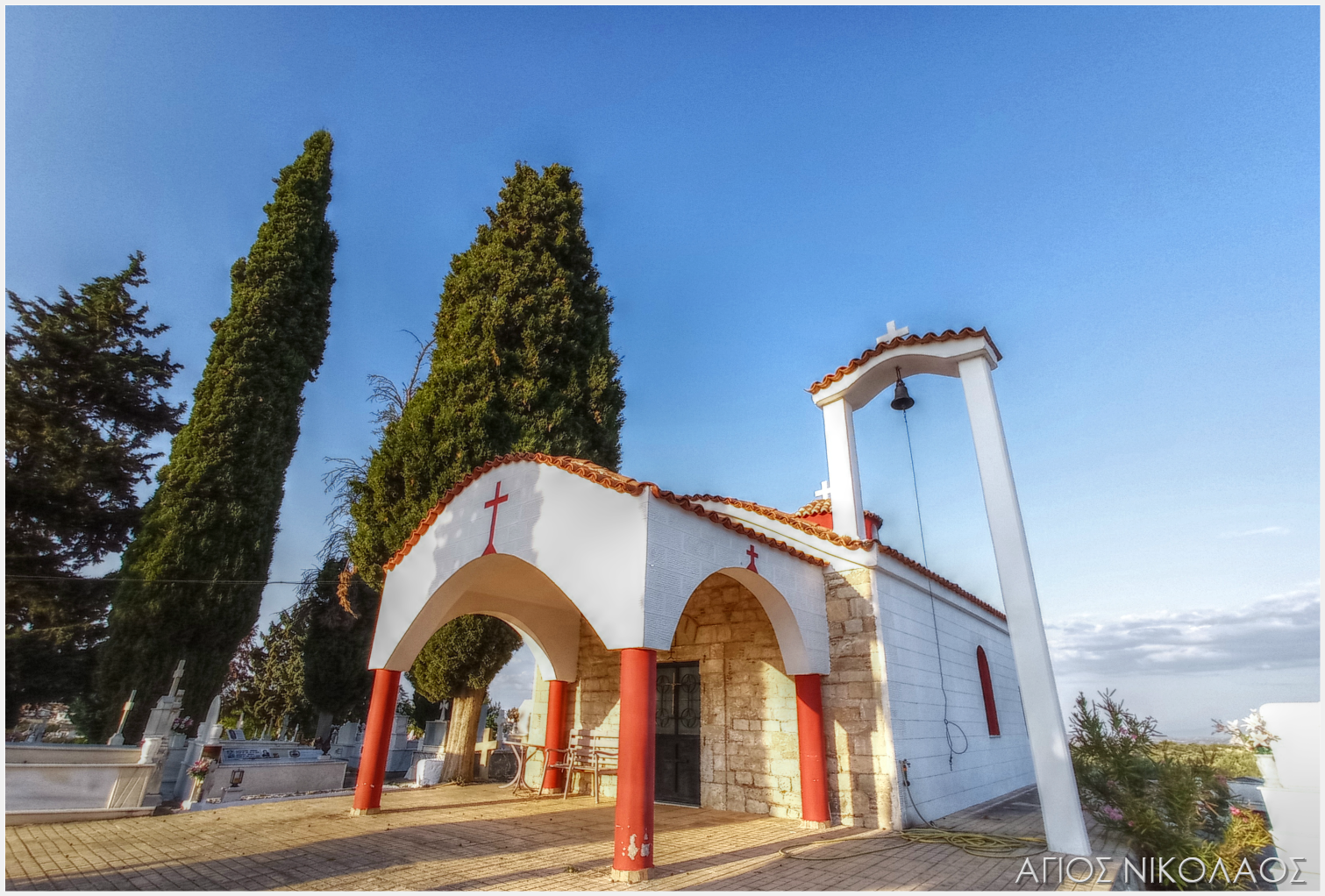
Saint Nikolaus chapel

== Notes ==
- 2003 research from Leiden and Ljubljana universities under the supervision of Prof. Dr. John Bintliff and his collaborators: E. Farinetti, P. Sarri, K. Sbonias, B. Slapsak, V. Stissi, A. Vionis
- Unpublished Documents relating to the final deliberation of the land in eastern Greece. Elias Papathanassopoulos
- History of Thebes and Boeotia. Georgios Tsebas.
