= Gardikiotis =

Gardikiotis is a given name and surname. Notable people with the name include:

- Dean Gardikiotis (born 1994), Australian footbal player
- Gardikiotis Grivas (1803–1855), Greek leader in the Greek War of Independence
- Leon Gardikiotis (born 1964), Greek-Australian football player and coach
