= Patrick Costinha =

Portuguese footballer

Personal information
- Full name: Patrick Zeferino Costinha
- Date of birth: 13 May 1994 (age 32)
- Place of birth: Zürich, Switzerland
- Height: 1.82 m (5 ft 11 1/2 in)
- Position: Goalkeeper

Youth career
- 2010–2012: Grasshopper
- 2012–2013: Vitória Setúbal

Senior career*
Years	Team	Apps	(Gls)
2013–2015	Amarante	33	(0)
2015	Cova da Piedade	0	(0)
2015–2018	Real	39	(0)
2018–2019	Amora	14	(0)
2019–2020	Pinhalnovense	22	(0)
- * Club domestic league appearances and goals as of 1 August 2020

Patrick Zeferino Costinha (born 13 May 1994) is a Portuguese footballer who plays as a goalkeeper.

== Football career ==
On 21 January 2018, Costinha made his professional debut with Real in a 2017–18 LigaPro match against União Madeira.
