= Riccardo Cretella =

Italian footballer (born 1994)

Personal information
- Date of birth: 30 July 1994 (age 32)
- Place of birth: Grosseto, Italy
- Height: 1.80 m (5 ft 11 in)
- Position: Midfielder

Team information
- Current team: U.S. Grosseto 1912
- Number: 4

Youth career
- –2011: Grosseto
- 2011–2012: Fiorentina

Senior career*
Years	Team	Apps	(Gls)
2012–2018	Gavorrano	78	(5)
2014–2015	→ Fortis Juventus (loan)	20	(3)
2018	→ Teramo (loan)	2	(0)
2018–2022	Grosseto	108	(27)
2022–2022	Livorno	4	(0)
2022–	Grosseto		
- * Club domestic league appearances and goals as of 24 September 2022

Riccardo Cretella (born 30 July 1994) is an Italian professional footballer who plays as a midfielder for Serie C Group B club Grosseto.

== Club career ==
Cretella started his career in Lega Pro Seconda Divisione club Gavorrano.

On 13 August 2018, Cretella signed for his hometown Eccellenza club Grosseto. He followed Grosseto to two promotions to Serie D and then Serie C.
