= Bernhard Kotynski =

Austrian footballer

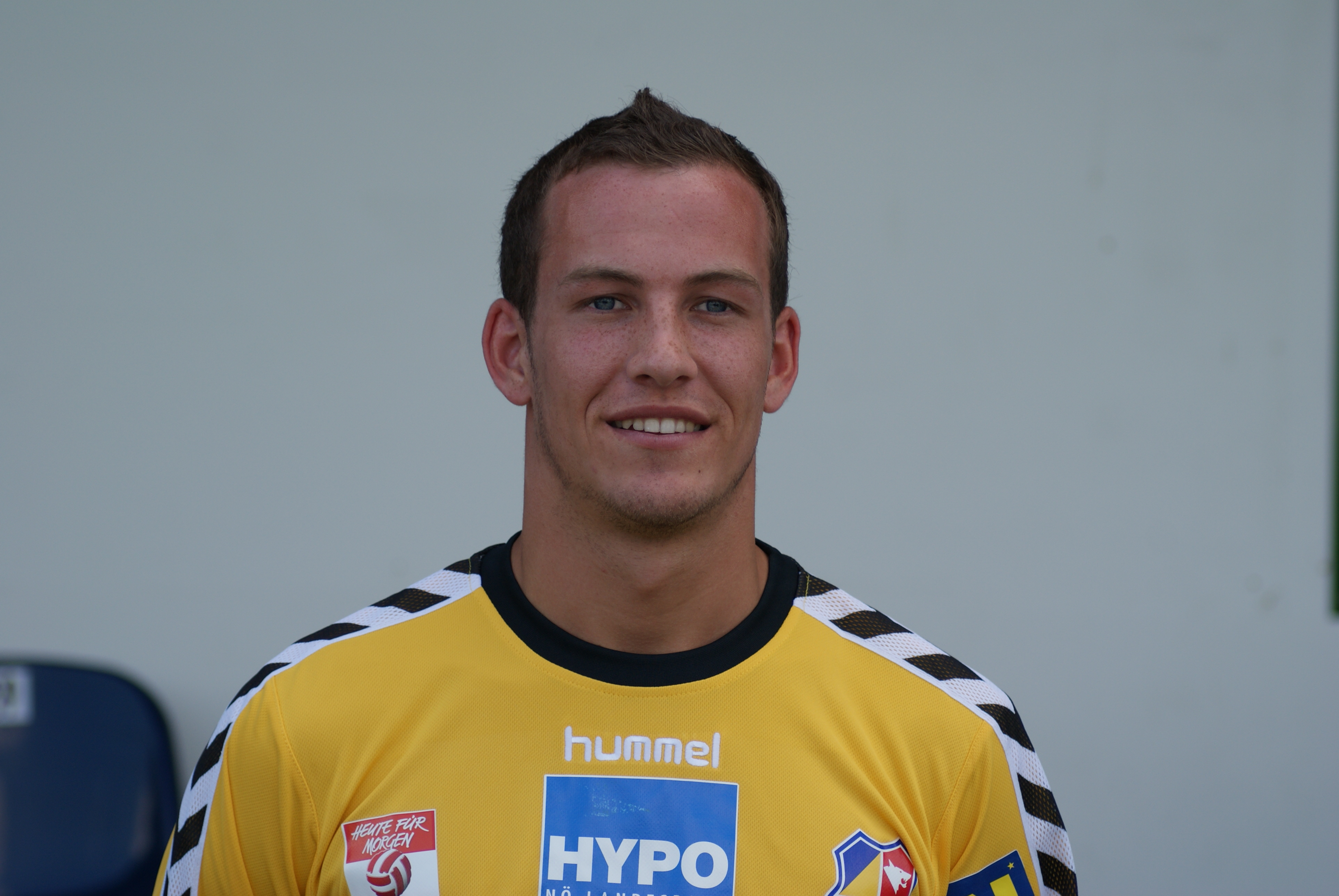

Personal information
- Date of birth: 13 April 1990 (age 36)
- Place of birth: Wien, Austria
- Height: 1.81 m (5 ft 11 1/2 in)
- Position: Defender

Team information
- Current team: FC Blau-Weiß Linz
- Number: 4

Youth career
- 1996–2004: SV Neulengbach
- 2004–2009: SKN St. Pölten

Senior career*
Years	Team	Apps	(Gls)
2009–2013	SKN St. Pölten	39	(1)
2013–2014	FC Ober-Grafendorf	30	(5)
2014–	FC Blau-Weiß Linz	11	(0)
- * Club domestic league appearances and goals as of 22 June 2016

Bernhard Kotynski (born 13 April 1994) is an Austrian footballer who plays for FC Blau-Weiß Linz.
