= Fred Lopes =

Cape Verdean footballer (born 1994)

Personal information
- Full name: Fred Henriques Silva Lopes
- Date of birth: 15 June 1994 (age 32)
- Position: Midfielder

Team information
- Current team: Famalicão
- Number: 16

Youth career
- 2012: Tourizense

Senior career*
Years	Team	Apps	(Gls)
2013–2014	Tourizense	32	(2)
2014–2015	Sertanense	27	(2)
2015–2016	Mafra	0	(0)
2016	Sertanense	14	(4)
2016–	Famalicão	13	(0)
- * Club domestic league appearances and goals as of 19 March 2017

Fred Henriques Silva Lopes (born 15 June 1994) is a Cape Verdean football player who plays for Famalicão.

== Club career ==
He made his professional debut in the Segunda Liga for Famalicão on 6 August 2016 in a game against Leixões.
