= Cornelia Sochor =

Austrian footballer (born 1994)

Personal information
- Date of birth: 7 June 1994 (age 32)
- Position: Defender

Senior career*
Years	Team	Apps	(Gls)
- Neulengbach

International career^{‡}
2010	Austria U17	3	(0)
2011–2013	Austria U19	12	(0)
2014	Austria	1	(0)
- * Club domestic league appearances and goals ‡ National team caps and goals as of 17 September 2014

Cornelia Sochor (born 7 June 1994) is an Austrian footballer who plays as a defender. She has been a member of the Austria women's national team.
