= Felipe Zang =

Brazilian footballer (born 1994)

Personal information
- Full name: Felipe Alfonso Zang
- Date of birth: 21 May 1994 (age 32)
- Place of birth: Santa Helena, Brazil
- Height: 1.90 m (6 ft 3 in)
- Position: Centre back

Team information
- Current team: Cianorte

Youth career
- Guarani-VA
- 2012–2013: Grêmio
- 2013–2014: Corinthians

Senior career*
Years	Team	Apps	(Gls)
2012	Guarani-VA	12	(0)
2014	Sampaio Corrêa	1	(0)
2015	Chapecoense	0	(0)
2016	Cruzeiro-RS	0	(0)
2016–	Cianorte		
- * Club domestic league appearances and goals as of 12 October 2014

Felipe Alfonso Zang (born 21 May 1994) is a Brazilian footballer who plays for Cianorte as a central defender.

== Club career ==
Born in Santa Helena, Paraná, Zang began his career with Guarani de Venâncio Aires, making his senior debuts with the side in 2012, in Campeonato Gaúcho Série A2. On 20 June 2012 he moved to Grêmio, returning to youth football.

On 13 August 2013 Zang joined Corinthians, also being assigned to the under-20s. He appeared with the side in Copa São Paulo de Futebol Júnior, also training with the main squad in September 2013.

On 3 September 2014 Zang signed for Sampaio Corrêa, in Série B. He made his professional debut on 11 October, starting in a 2–2 away draw against América-RN but being replaced in the 9th minute due to an injury.

On 5 January 2015 Zang joined Série A side Chapecoense, after agreeing to a one-year deal.

== Honours ==
Grêmio

- Taça Belo Horizonte de Juniores: 2012
