= Rikard Östlin =

Swedish footballer

Personal information
- Full name: Nils Rikard Östlin
- Date of birth: 16 January 1994 (age 32)
- Place of birth: Karlshamn, Sweden
- Height: 1.85 m (6 ft 1 in)
- Position: Left back

Youth career
- Högadals IS

Senior career*
Years	Team	Apps	(Gls)
2013–2015	Mjällby AIF	6	(0)
2015	→ Asarums IF (loan)	3	(0)
2016–2019	Asarums IF	36	(1)
- * Club domestic league appearances and goals as of 17 October 2019

Rikard Östlin (born 16 January 1994 in Karlshamn) is a Swedish former footballer who played for Mjällby AIF and Asarums IF as a left back.

== Career ==
Östlin started playing football for the local club Högadals IS before joining Blekinge's biggest club Mjällby AIF, where he made his Allsvenskan debut in 2013. He became a regular starter for the club in early summer of 2014 before picking up a year-long injury in late July.

He went on loan to Division 2 club Asarums IF during the autumn of 2015, but picked up another injury after only three league games. He however signed a long-term contract with the club in April 2016 and remained there for four years before retiring from football as a 25-year-old.
