= Bryan Canela =

Peruvian footballer (born 1994)

Personal information
- Full name: Bryan Jair Canela Mestanza
- Date of birth: 20 March 1994 (age 32)
- Place of birth: Chancay, Peru
- Height: 1.70 m (5 ft 7 in)
- Position: Midfielder

Team information
- Current team: Deportivo Garcilaso

Senior career*
Years	Team	Apps	(Gls)
2012	Cantolao		
2013	Defensor San Alejandro	3	(0)
2014	Alianza Lima	3	(0)
2015	Cienciano		
2016	Deportivo Coopsol	17	(5)
2017–2018	Cantolao	16	(1)
2018	Ayacucho FC	7	(0)
2019	Futuro Kings		
2019–	Deportivo Garcilaso		
- * Club domestic league appearances and goals

Bryan Jair Canela Mestanza (born 20 March 1994) is a Peruvian footballer who plays as a midfielder for Deportivo Garcilaso. Besides Peru, he has played in Equatorial Guinea.
