= Denis Selishchev =

Russian footballer

Personal information
- Full name: Denis Valeryevich Selishchev
- Date of birth: 19 January 1994 (age 32)
- Place of birth: Penza, Russia
- Height: 1.86 m (6 ft 1 in)
- Positions: Defender; midfielder

Senior career*
Years	Team	Apps	(Gls)
2011–2015	FC Luch-Energiya Vladivostok	28	(0)
2016	FC Zenit Penza	20	(2)
2017	FC Nosta Novotroitsk	7	(0)
2017–2018	FC Biolog-Novokubansk	28	(1)

International career
2011–2012	Russia U-18	6	(0)
- * Club domestic league appearances and goals

Denis Valeryevich Selishchev (Russian: Денис Валерьевич Селищев; born 19 January 1994) is a Russian former professional football player.

== Club career ==
He made his Russian Football National League debut for FC Luch-Energiya Vladivostok on 27 May 2012 in a game against FC Fakel Voronezh.
