= Elin Bergkvist =

Swedish footballer (born 1994)

Elin Bergvist
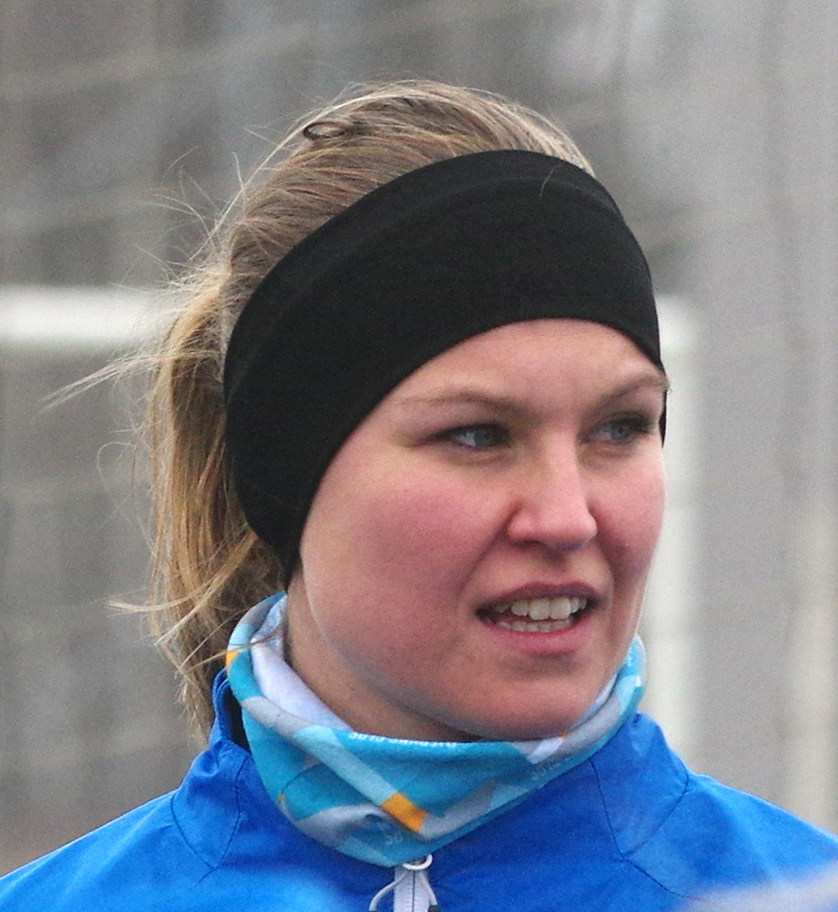

Personal information
- Full name: Elin Bergvist
- Date of birth: 21 January 1994 (age 32)
- Place of birth: Sweden,
- Height: 1.72 m (5 ft 8 in)
- Position: Defender

Team information
- Current team: Brommapojkarna

Senior career*
Years	Team	Apps	(Gls)
2011–2016	Piteå IF	44	(1)
2015	Sunnanå SK	3	(0)
2017–2018	IFK Kalmar	43	(0)
2019	Hammarby IF	15	(0)
2020-	Brommapojkarna	35	(2)
- * Club domestic league appearances and goals as of 3 July 2020

Elin Bergkvist (born 21 January 1994) is a Swedish football defender currently playing for IF Brommapojkarna in the Elitettan.
