= Rodrigo Vera =

Mexican footballer (born 1994)

Personal information
- Full name: Rodrigo Vera Sánchez
- Date of birth: 23 June 1994 (age 32)
- Place of birth: Agua Dulce, Mexico
- Height: 1.74 m (5 ft 9 in)
- Position: Right-back

Senior career*
Years	Team	Apps	(Gls)
2010-2011	Tiburones Rojos de Boca del Río	4	
2011-2013	Tiburones Rojos de Veracruz	3	
2013-2016	Atlético San Luis	18	
2015-2017	Club Deportivo Tepatitlán de Morelos	22	
2018-2019	Salamanca UDS	22	
- * Club domestic league appearances and goals as of 17 August 2025

Rodrigo Vera Sánchez (born 23 June 1994), is a Mexican professional footballer who plays for C.D. Tepatitlán de Morelos as a right-back.
