= Wojciech Onsorge =

Polish footballer (1994–2026)

Personal information
- Date of birth: 13 April 1994
- Place of birth: Poznań, Poland
- Date of death: 31 August 2026 (aged 32)
- Place of death: Mosina, Poland
- Height: 1.88 m (6 ft 2 in)
- Positions: Centre-back; defensive midfielder

Youth career
- 1920 Mosina
- –2012: Warta Poznań

Senior career*
Years	Team	Apps	(Gls)
2012–2013	Warta Poznań II		
2013–2019	Warta Poznań	86	(14)
2019–2020	Elana Toruń	44	(6)
2020–2021	Polonia Środa Wielkopolska	15	(1)
2021	Lech Poznań II	8	(0)
- * Club domestic league appearances and goals

Wojciech Onsorge (13 April 1994 – 31 August 2026) was a Polish professional footballer, youth coach, and scout. He played as a centre-back or defensive midfielder, and started coaching youth teams early on in his career; he later ran his own academies. He was strongly linked to his hometown Poznań's two professional clubs, Warta and Lech, as well as youth teams in its southern suburbs. He also had a successful season at Elana Toruń whilst still a player. Diagnosed with an inoperable brain tumour aged 28, he continued as a football scout and youth coach until his death four years later.

== Biography ==
=== Early life ===
Wojciech Onsorge was born in Poznań on 13 April 1994.

=== Playing career ===
He began his career at 1920 Mosina based in Mosina before quickly transferring to Warta Poznań. He played one season for their reserves before quickly promoting to the first team. Onsorge ended up staying at Warta for 13 years, making his debut in 2012 against Zawisza Bydgoszcz when Warta was in the second tier. Following this, he played for the club even as they fell to the fourth division, and then subsequently helped them return to the second.

He stayed at Warta until February 2019, when he moved to Elana Toruń. Elana came close to promotion, and Onsorge was remembered for his important goal against GKS Bełchatów which brought them closer to that aim. Overall, he was considered a very determined and reliable player at the club. Aged 26, on 4 August 2020 he joined Polonia Środa Wielkopolska where went on to play half-a-season before joining Lech Poznań's reserve team on 6 February 2021. As an experienced player, his role was to help and mentor the youth and work towards a coaching licence.

=== Coaching and scouting career ===
Onsorge coached Warta's youth teams and the youth team of UKS Orlik Mosina, where he most notably coached future Lech player Hubert Janyszka. After leaving Warta, he set up his own football academy.

While undergoing therapy for his life-threatening illness, Onsorge continued running his academies in Luboń and Puszczykowo, and working as a youth scout for Lech Poznań.

=== Illness and death ===
In June 2021, Onsorge fell gravely ill and underwent a head MRI scan; he was subsequently diagnosed with an inoperable brain tumour, specifically in the parietal lobe. In order to help fight the life-threatening situation, a fundraiser for his medical costs was started, promoted by both Poznań clubs and the people associated with them. In late 2022, he announced that his recovery was going well.

Onsorge died on 31 August 2026, aged 32. Lech's Ekstraklasa match against Jagiellonia on 3 September 2026 was preceded by a minute's silence and his funeral the following day in Mosina gathered a substantial number of mourners.

== Honours ==
Warta Poznań

- III liga Kuyavia-Pomerania–Greater Poland: 2014–15, 2015–16
