= Issy ten Donkelaar =

Dutch football manager

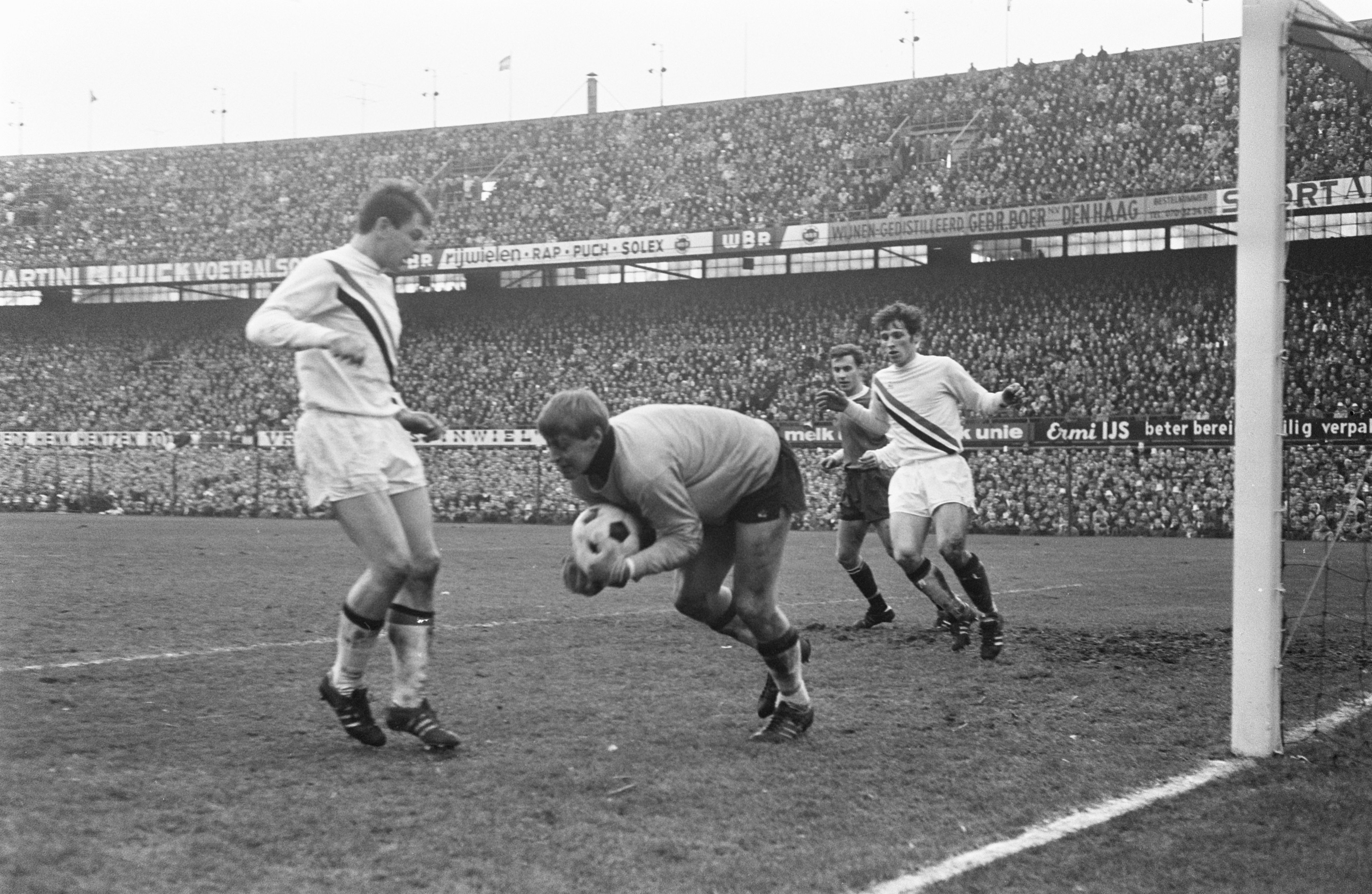
- Ten Donkelaar (on the right in white) against Feyenoord in 1968

Personal information
- Date of birth: 7 October 1941 (age 85)
- Place of birth: Losser, Netherlands
- Position: Defender

Senior career*
Years	Team	Apps	(Gls)
1962–1965	Sportclub Enschede	54	(11)
1965–1971	Twente	158	(15)
1971–1973	Heracles	55	(1)
Total		267	(27)

Managerial career
- 1994–1995: Twente
- * Club domestic league appearances and goals

Issy ten Donkelaar (born 7 October 1941) is a Dutch retired football defender and later manager.

He played the majority of his career for Sportclub Enschede and its successor Twente. He was the first player to be red-carded in the history of Dutch professional football, on 27 August 1972.
