= Dejan Jurkič =

Slovenian footballer

Personal information
- Date of birth: 9 December 1983 (age 42)
- Place of birth: Kranj, SFR Yugoslavia
- Height: 1.84 m (6 ft 0 in)
- Position: Defender

Senior career*
Years	Team	Apps	(Gls)
1990–2004	Naklo		
2004–2005	Šenčur	24	(8)
2005–2006	Örgryte	3	(0)
2006	FIF Qviding	14	(0)
2007	Panserraikos		
2007–2008	Sigma Olomouc	10	(0)
2008	Kladno	4	(0)
2009	Slovácko	6	(0)
2009–2010	Maribor	8	(0)
2012–2015	SU Sankt Veit/Gölsen	98	(49)
2016	WSV Traisen	10	(2)
2016–2017	SU Sankt Veit/Gölsen	24	(5)
2017-2018	USC Rohrbach	29	(3)
2018-2019	USC Mank	22	(6)
2019–2020	NK Pajde Möhlin		
- * Club domestic league appearances and goals

Dejan Jurkič (born 9 December 1983 in Kranj) is a Slovenian retired footballer who last played for Swiss side Pajde Möhlin.
