= André Caio =

Portuguese footballer

Personal information
- Full name: André Filipe Alves Martins Caio
- Date of birth: 23 February 1994 (age 32)
- Place of birth: Castelo Branco, Portugal
- Height: 1.82 m (6 ft 0 in)
- Position: Goalkeeper

Youth career
- 2002–2009: Desportivo Castelo Branco
- 2009–2013: Porto
- 2010–2011: → Padroense (loan)

Senior career*
Years	Team	Apps	(Gls)
2013–2016	Porto B	3	(0)
2016–2017	Mafra	11	(0)
2017–2023	Benfica Castelo Branco	123	(0)
Total		137	(0)
- * Club domestic league appearances and goals

André Filipe Alves Martins Caio (born 23 February 1994 in Castelo Branco) is a Portuguese former professional footballer who played as a goalkeeper.

== Career ==
Caio began his career in the youth ranks of Desportivo Castelo Branco. In 2009 he joined FC Porto where he played until the 2015-16 season, mainly for Porto B. I He subsequently played for Mafra and Benfica Castelo Branco. In July 2023, he switched to playing futsal for AR Bairro da Boa Esperança.
