= Vinzenz Flatz =

Liechtensteiner international footballer

Personal information
- Date of birth: 5 July 1994 (age 32)
- Place of birth: Vaduz, Liechtenstein
- Height: 1.80 m (5 ft 11 in)
- Position: Midfielder

Youth career
- Young Boys

Senior career*
Years	Team	Apps	(Gls)
2012–2014	Young Boys II	30	(0)
2014–2015	FC Vaduz	0	(0)
2015–2021	FC Konolfingen	63	(1)
2021–2024	FC Bern		

International career
2012	Liechtenstein	3	(0)

Managerial career
- 2024–: FC Konolfingen
- * Club domestic league appearances and goals

Vinzenz Flatz (born 5 July 1994) is a Liechtensteiner retired footballer who played as a midfielder.

Born in Vaduz, Flatz was a youth player for BSC Young Boys and Liechtenstein national youth teams. His older brother Valentin was a Liechtenstein U21 player too.

He played club football for Young Boys II, FC Vaduz, FC Konolfingen and FC Bern. His time at Vaduz was short.

He made his international debut for Liechtenstein in 2012.

In late 2024, Flatz took over as co-manager of FC Konolfingen together with Philipp Brechbühl.
