= Duvier Díaz =

Colombian footballer (born 1994)

Personal information
- Full name: Duvier Díaz Balanta
- Date of birth: 21 August 1994 (age 32)
- Place of birth: Cauca, Colombia
- Height: 1.86 m (6 ft 1 in)
- Position: Defender

Youth career
- 2012–2013: Dépor Aguablanca

Senior career*
Years	Team	Apps	(Gls)
2014–2015	Orizaba		
2015–2018	Irapuato	71	(2)
2018–2019	Celaya	9	(1)
2021–2023	Boyacá Chicó	17	(0)
Total		97	(3)
- * Club domestic league appearances and goals

Duvier Díaz Balanta (born 21 August 1994) is a Colombian former footballer who played as a defender.

== Club career ==
Born in the Buenos Aires in the Cauca Department, Díaz was raised in the small town of Honduras, Cauca, and played locally before deciding to join an organised team at the age of seventeen. He joined Dépor Aguablanca, where he stayed for two years, before a move to Mexico. He initially joined Orizaba, before a stint with Irapuato. He scored his first goal for Irapuato in a 1–0 win against Pachuca Premier in November 2015.

After five years in Mexico, he trialled with América de Cali, but despite registering, he did not feature for the club. In May 2018, he trialled with Ascenso MX club Celaya, and was involved in their pre-season preparation. Having not featured in the Apertura 2018 due to injury, he joined up with the first team for the Clausura 2019, and scored on his debut in a 1–0 win against Dorados de Sinaloa on 5 January 2019.

After a break from football, Díaz returned to Colombia and joined Categoría Primera B club Boyacá Chicó. He spent three seasons with the club, helping them achieve promotion to the Categoría Primera A, before leaving at the end of the 2023 season.

== Career statistics ==
=== Club ===
Appearances and goals by club, season and competition
Club	Season	League			Cup (Note: Includes Copa MX and Copa Colombia)		Other		Total	
Club	Season	Division	Apps	Goals	Apps	Goals	Apps	Goals	Apps	Goals
Irapuato	2015–16	Segunda Division	25	1	0	0	0	0	25	1
Irapuato	2016–17	Segunda Division	20	1	0	0	0	0	20	1
Irapuato	2017–18	Liga Premier - Serie A	26	0	0	0	0	0	26	0
Irapuato	Total		71	2	0	0	0	0	71	2
Celaya	2018–19	Ascenso MX	7	1	0	0	0	0	7	1
Celaya	2019–20	Ascenso MX	2	0	3	0	0	0	5	0
Celaya	Total		9	1	3	0	0	0	12	1
Boyacá Chicó	2021	Categoría Primera B	2	0	0	0	0	0	2	0
Boyacá Chicó	2022	Categoría Primera B	15	0	0	0	0	0	15	0
Boyacá Chicó	2023	Categoría Primera A	0	0	1	0	0	0	1	0
Boyacá Chicó	Total		17	0	1	0	0	0	18	0
Career total			97	3	4	0	0	0	101	3
