= Michael Schindele =

German footballer

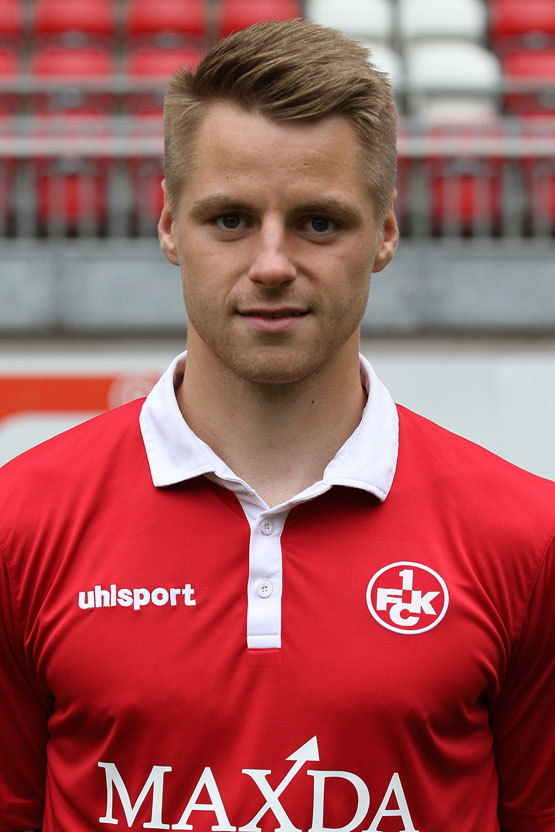
- Schindele in 2015

Personal information
- Date of birth: 27 January 1994 (age 32)
- Place of birth: Ellwangen, Germany
- Height: 1.88 m (6 ft 2 in)
- Position: Centre-back

Team information
- Current team: Sportfreunde Dorfmerkingen
- Number: 30

Youth career
- 2010–2011: FC Augsburg
- 2011–2013: 1. FC Kaiserslautern

Senior career*
Years	Team	Apps	(Gls)
2013–2017	1. FC Kaiserslautern II	96	(2)
2015	→ 1. FC Kaiserslautern	1	(0)
2017–2019	SSV Ulm 1846	55	(5)
2019–	Sportfreunde Dorfmerkingen	19	(3)

International career
2011	Germany U18	3	(0)
- * Club domestic league appearances and goals as of 30 December 2020

Michael Schindele (born 27 January 1994) is a German footballer who plays as a centre-back for Sportfreunde Dorfmerkingen.
