= Guillermo Ferreras =

Dominican footballer (born 1994)

Personal information
- Full name: Oscalín Guillermo Ferraras
- Date of birth: 16 February 1994 (age 32)
- Place of birth: Vicente Noble, Dominican Republic
- Positions: Centre-back; right-back

Team information
- Current team: Atlético Pantoja

Youth career
- 2011–2012: Orcasitas

Senior career*
Years	Team	Apps	(Gls)
2014–2015	Vallecas	17	(0)
2016–2017	Racing Villaverde	13	(1)
2017	Atlántico		
2018	Moca		
2019–	Atlético Pantoja		

International career^{‡}
2018–	Dominican Republic	2	(0)
- * Club domestic league appearances and goals ‡ National team caps and goals as of 25 March 2018

Oscalín Guillermo Ferraras (born 16 February 1994), known as Guillermo Ferreras, is a Dominican professional footballer who plays as a defender for Liga DF club Atlético Pantoja and the Dominican Republic national team.

== International career ==
Guillermo Ferreras made his international debut for Dominican Republic on 22 March 2018, being a second-half substitute in a 4–0 friendly win against Turks and Caicos Islands.
