= Zé Lucas (footballer, born 1994) =

Brazilian footballer

Personal information
- Full name: José Lucas Caetano da Silva
- Date of birth: 7 March 1994 (age 32)
- Place of birth: Londrina, Brazil
- Height: 1.85 m (6 ft 1 in)
- Position: Forward

Team information
- Current team: VV Prinsenland

Youth career
- –2011: PSTC
- 2012–2016: Fluminense
- 2014: → Botafogo (loan)

Senior career*
| Years | Team | Apps | (Gls) |
| 2013–2016 | Fluminense | 0 | (0) |
| 2016 | → Šamorín (loan) | 16 | (6) |
| 2016–2017 | Stal Mielec | 2 | (0) |
| 2017 | Itararé | 16 | (4) |
| 2017–2018 | Qormi | 24 | (13) |
| 2018–2019 | Żebbuġ Rangers | 25 | (10) |
| 2019–2021 | Pietà Hotspurs | 36 | (14) |
| 2021–2022 | Swieqi United | 12 | (4) |
| 2022–2024 | RBC | | |
| 2024– | VV Prinsenland | | |
- * Club domestic league appearances and goals as of 00:47, 7 March 2024 (UTC)

José Lucas Caetano da Silva (born 7 March 1994), commonly known as Zé Lucas, is a Brazilian footballer who plays as a forward for Dutch club VV Prinsenland.

== Club career ==
Zé Lucas started his career with PSTC of his hometown, before moving to Fluminense in 2012. In his first year with the Laranjeiras-based side, he scored the winning goal against Botafogo to win the youth version of the Taça Guanabara. He was also top scorer in the whole state of Rio de Janeiro.

He was loaned to Botafogo in 2014, and spent the whole year with the club's youth team. He went to America in 2015 to study at university and improve his English, however he was rejected a scholarship as he had already played professionally. As a result of this, he remained with Fluminense, and joined Slovak side Šamorín on loan in 2016, and scored 6 goals as they won the 3. Liga.

Following Fluminense's affiliate link with Stal Mielec in 2015, Zé Lucas was announced to have permanently joined the Polish side. He made his debut in a Polish Cup game against Chojniczanka Chojnice, playing 90 minutes in a 0–2 defeat.

After two league appearances, Zé Lucas returned to Brazil to join Campeonato Paulista Segunda Divisão side Itararé.

== Career statistics ==
=== Club ===
As of 10 July 2019.

| Club | Season | League | | | Cup | | Continental | | Other | | Total | |
| Club | Season | Division | Apps | Goals | Apps | Goals | Apps | Goals | Apps | Goals | Apps | Goals |
|---|---|---|---|---|---|---|---|---|---|---|---|---|
| Šamorín (loan) | 2016–17 | 3. Liga | 16 | 6 | 0 | 0 | – | | 0 | 0 | 16 | 6 |
| Stal Mielec | 2016–17 | I liga | 2 | 0 | 1 (Note: Appearances in the Polish Cup) | 0 | – | | 0 | 0 | 3 | 0 |
| Qormi | 2017–18 | Maltese First Division | 24 | 13 | 1 (Note: Appearances in the Maltese FA Trophy) | 0 | – | | 0 | 0 | 25 | 13 |
| Żebbuġ Rangers | 2018–19 | Maltese First Division | 25 | 10 | 1 | 0 | – | | 0 | 0 | 26 | 10 |
| Career total | | | 67 | 29 | 3 | 0 | 0 | 0 | 0 | 0 | 70 | 29 |
