= Dean Gardikiotis =

Greek footballer

Personal information
- Full name: Odysseas Dean Gardikiotis
- Date of birth: 9 September 1994 (age 32)
- Place of birth: Sydney, Australia
- Height: 1.85 m (6 ft 1 in)
- Position: Goalkeeper

Youth career
- St George
- Dulwich Hill
- Bankstown City
- 2008–2011: Middlesbrough
- 2011–2014: Blackpool
- 2016: Chivas Florida

Senior career*
Years	Team	Apps	(Gls)
2015	Cray Wanderers	8	(0)
2016	Dartford	3	(0)
2017	Acharnaikos	2	(0)
2017	Kallithea	0	(0)

International career
2009	Greece U17	2	(0)
- * Club domestic league appearances and goals as of 18:04, 31 May 2017 (UTC)

Odysseas Dean Gardikiotis (Greek: Οδυσσέας Ντιν Γαρδικιώτης; born 9 September 1994) is a professional footballer who plays as a goalkeeper. Born in Australia, he has represented Greece at youth level.

== Club career ==
Born in Australia, Gardikiotis started his career with Australian lower league sides, before joining Middlesbrough in 2008. He played for their youth sides for three years before joining then-Championship side Blackpool in 2011. After leaving Blackpool in 2014, he signed with non-league side Cray Wanderers, having trialled with Derby County.

He signed for Dartford in March 2016, and made his debut when he filled in for the injured Deren Ibrahim against Basingstoke Town in April 2016.

After a short spell with the Chivas USA Academy in Florida, Gardikiotis signed with Acharnaikos in 2017, having rejected a contract with the Greek side the previous year.

== International career ==
Gardikiotis has represented the Greek under-17 side twice, making his debut in December 2009 in a friendly against Serbia.

== Personal life ==
He is the son of the former player and manager Leon Gardikiotis.

== Career statistics ==
=== Club ===
As of 14 June 2017

Club	Season	League			Cup		Continental		Other		Total	
Club	Season	Division	Apps	Goals	Apps	Goals	Apps	Goals	Apps	Goals	Apps	Goals
Dartford	2015–16	National League South	3	0	1 (Note: Appearance in the Kent Senior Cup)	0	–		0	0	4	0
Acharnaikos	2016–17	Football League	2	0	0	0	–		0	0	2	0
Kallithea	2017–18	Football League	0	0	0	0	–		0	0	0	0
Career total			5	0	1	0	–		0	0	6	0
