= Can Aktav =

Turkish footballer (born 1994)

Personal information
- Full name: Can Demir Aktav
- Date of birth: 31 August 1994 (age 32)
- Place of birth: Seyhan, Turkey
- Height: 1.90 m (6 ft 3 in)
- Position: Defender

Team information
- Current team: Çankaya
- Number: 94

Youth career
- 2004–2008: Çukurovaspor
- 2008–2012: Konya Anadolu Selçukspor

Senior career*
| Years | Team | Apps | (Gls) |
| 2012–2016 | Konya Anadolu Selçukspor | 113 | (7) |
| 2016–2018 | Konyaspor | 1 | (0) |
| 2017–2018 | → Adana Demirspor (loan) | 1 | (0) |
| 2018 | → Tuzlaspor (loan) | 16 | (0) |
| 2018–2020 | Sancaktepe FK | 19 | (0) |
| 2020–2022 | 1922 Konyaspor | 74 | (5) |
| 2022– | Çankaya | 11 | (2) |
- * Club domestic league appearances and goals as of 13 November 2022

Can Demir Aktav (born 31 August 1994) is a Turkish football player who plays as a defender for Çankaya.

== Professional career ==
Aktav was a youth footballer for Konya Anadolu Selçukspor, and was a constant starter for them before his transfer to Konyaspor. Can made his professional debut for Konyaspor in a 2-1 Süper Lig win over Çaykur Rizespor on 21 January 2017.
