= Ivica Jurkić =

Bosnian Croat footballer

Personal information
- Date of birth: 22 February 1994 (age 32)
- Place of birth: Livno, Bosnia and Herzegovina
- Height: 1.89 m (6 ft 2 1/2 in)
- Position: Centre back

Team information
- Current team: Jalžabet

Youth career
- Troglav Livno

Senior career*
Years	Team	Apps	(Gls)
2013–2014	Troglav Livno		
2014–2015	Kamešnica Podhum		
2015	Zadar	10	(0)
2015–2016	Hrvatski Dragovoljac	6	(0)
2016–2017	Istra 1961	18	(0)
2017	Mladost Doboj Kakanj	0	(0)
2017–2018	Bisceglie Calcio	30	(0)
2019–2020	Zelina		
2020	Waldbach	0	(0)
2020–2021	Rogaška		
2021–	Jalžabet		
- * Club domestic league appearances and goals as of 20:46, 6 July 2021 (UTC)

Ivica Jurkić (born 22 February 1994) is a Bosnian Croat footballer who currently plays for NK Zelina.

== Club career ==
Jurkić passed through all the youth ranks of his local club NK Troglav 1918 Livno, before moving on to another lower-tier club, NK Kamešnica Podhum in 2014.

He moved to Croatia in 2015, to the top-tier NK Zadar, featuring in 11 matches, 10 in the league and 1 in the cup until the end of the season, which saw his club relegated. He moved on to another Druga HNL team, NK Hrvatski Dragovoljac at the start of the 2015/2016 season, but was soon back in the Prva HNL, having signed a year and a half long contract with NK Istra 1961. A left-back during his entire career, he was moved by coach Andrej Panadić to a more central role, playing as the left centre back.

In August 2019, Jurkić joined NK Zelina. After a spell in 2020 at Austrian club SVH Waldbach and later Slovenian club NK Rogaška, Jurkić returned to Croatia ind March 2021 to join NK Jalžabet.
