= Outline of ancient Greece =

Overview of and topical guide to ancient Greece

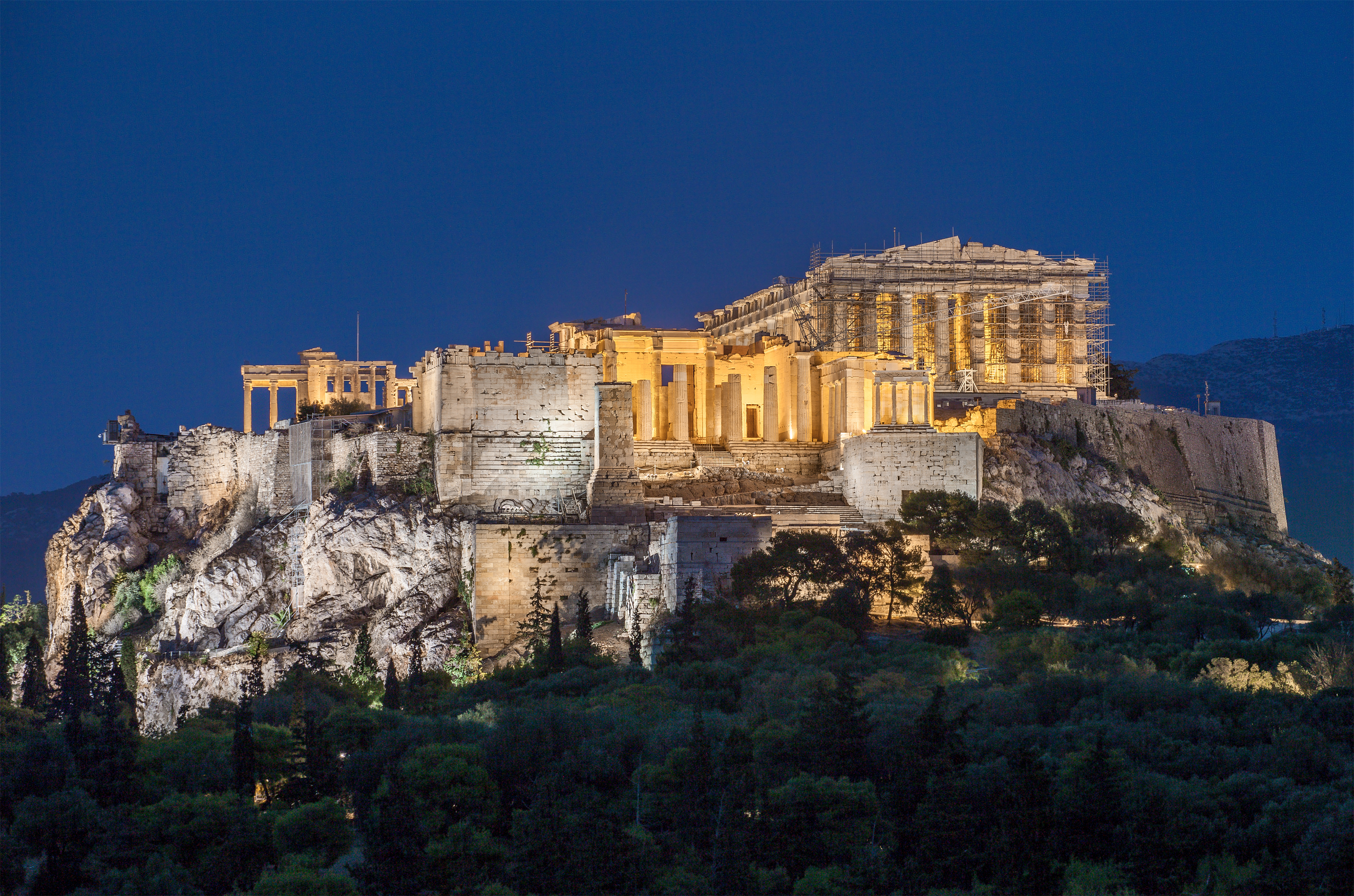
The Acropolis of Athens

The following outline is provided as an overview of and topical guide to ancient Greece:

Ancient Greece –

== Geography of Ancient Greece ==
- Towns of ancient Greece
  - List of ancient Greek cities

=== Regions of Ancient Greece ===
Regions of ancient Greece

- Peloponnese
  - Achaea
    - Patras
    - Dyme
  - Arcadia
    - Mantineia
    - Megalopolis
    - Tegea
  - Argolis
    - Argos
    - Mycenae
    - Tiryns
    - Epidaurus
    - Nafplio
    - Nemea
  - Corinthia
    - Corinth
    - Sicyon
  - Elis
    - Elis (city)
    - Olympia
    - Figaleia
  - Laconia
    - Sparta
    - Gytheio
  - Messenia
    - Messene
    - Ithome
    - Pylos
- Central Greece
  - Aeniania
  - Attica
    - Athens
    - Eleusis
    - Laurion
    - Marathon
  - Boeotia
    - Thebes
    - Orchomenus
    - Chaeronea
  - Doris
  - Euboea
    - Chalcis
    - Eretria
  - Locris
    - Amfissa
  - Megaris
    - Megara
  - Oetaea
  - Phocis
    - Delphi
    - Elatea
  - Acarnania
    - Stratos
  - Aetolia
    - Thermos
  - Aperantia
  - Dolopia
- Thessaly
  - Pherae
  - Larissa
    - Autonomous Subregion
  - Magnesia
    - Subregions within Thessaly
  - Achaea Phthiotis
  - Histiaeotis
  - Pelasgiotis
  - Perrhaebia
- Epirus
  - Cities in ancient Epirus
  - Chaonia
    - Cestrine
    - Chimaera
    - Buthrotum
    - Panormos
    - Onchesmos
    - Antigonia
    - Palaeste
    - Phoenice
  - Molossis
    - Dodona
  - Thesprotia
    - Ambracia
    - Cassope
  - Parauaea
  - Tymphaea
- Macedon
  - Pelagonia
- Aegean Sea
- Crete
- Cyprus
- Ionian Sea
- Hellespont
- Sea of Marmara
- Bosphorus
- Asia Minor
  - Ionia
    - Smyrna
  - Aeolis
    - Cyme
  - Doris
    - Halicarnassus
  - Pontus
- Magna Grecia
- Greek colonies

== Government and politics of ancient Greece ==
- Greek democracy
  - Athenian democracy
- Polis

=== Ancient Greek law ===
Ancient Greek law

- Ancient Greek lawmakers
  - Draco – first legislator of Athens in Ancient Greece. He replaced the prevailing system of oral law and blood feud by a written code to be enforced only by a court. Draco's written law became known for its harshness, with the adjective "draconian" referring to similarly unforgiving rules or laws.
    - Draconian constitution – first written constitution of Athens. So that no one would be unaware of them, they were posted on wooden tablets (ἄξονες – axones), where they were preserved for almost two centuries, on steles of the shape of three-sided pyramids (κύρβεις – kyrbeis).
  - Solon – Athenian statesman and lawmaker, remembered for the Solonian Constitution.
    - Solonian Constitution – a code of laws embracing the whole of public and private life. It sought to revise or abolish the older laws of Draco.
      - Seisachtheia – a set of laws instituted by the Athenian lawmaker Solon in order to rectify the widespread serfdom and slavery that had run rampant in Athens by the 6th century BC, by debt relief.
- Dreros inscription – the earliest surviving inscribed law from ancient Greece.
- Heliaia, the supreme court of ancient Athens.
- Great Rhetra, the constitution of Sparta

=== Military history of ancient Greece ===
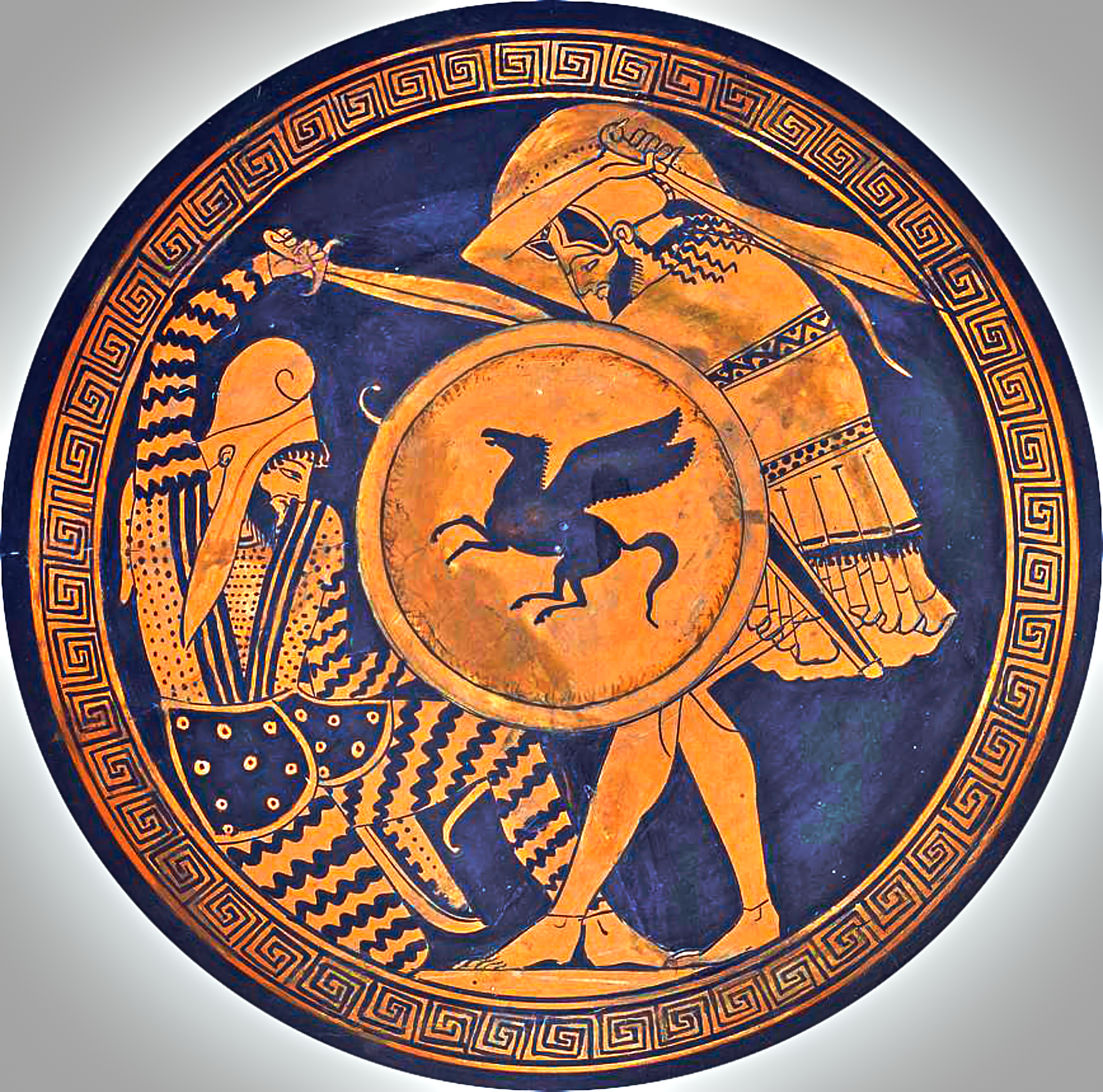
Greek hoplite and Persian warrior fighting, depicted on an ancient kylix, 5th century BC

Military history of ancient Greece

==== Military of ancient Greece ====
- Ancient Greek warfare
  - Ancient Greek mercenaries
  - Ancient Greek military personal equipment
  - Athenian military
  - Hoplite
  - Hoplite phalanx
  - Military tactics in Ancient Greece
- Homosexuality in the militaries of ancient Greece
- Military of Mycenaean Greece

==== Military powers and alliances ====
- Ionian League (started mid-7th century BC)
- 1st Achaean League (formed in 5th century BC)
- Delian League (478–404 BCE)
- Spartan hegemony (431–371 BCE)
- Theban hegemony (371–362 BCE)
- League of Corinth (338–322 BCE)
- Peloponnesian League (6th to 4th century BC)
- Arcadian League (370 to 3rd century BCE)
- 2nd Achaean League (280–146 BCE)
- Aetolian League (4th to 3rd century BCE?)

==== Military conflicts ====
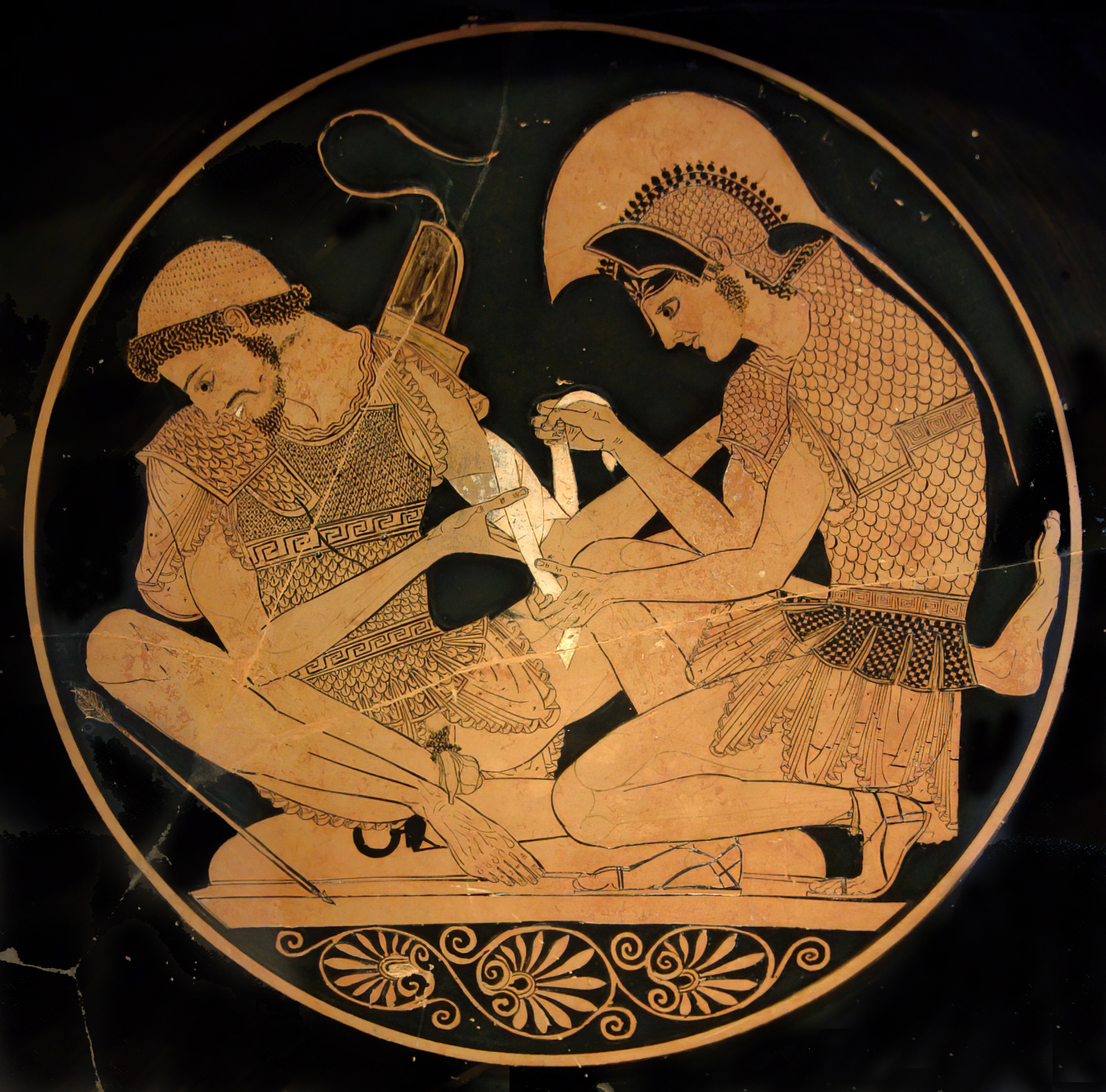
Achilles tending Patroclus wounded by an arrow (Attic red-figure kylix, c. 500 BC)

- Trojan War
  - Returns from Troy
  - Trojan War characters
- Lelantine War
- Messenian Wars
  - First Messenian War
  - Second Messenian War
  - Third Messenian War
- First Sacred War
- Greco-Persian Wars – series of conflicts between the Achaemenid Empire of Persia and city-states of the Hellenic world that started in 499 BC and lasted until 449 BC.
  - Battle of Ephesus (498 BC)
  - Battle of Lade
  - Battle of Marathon
  - Battle of Thermopylae
  - Battle of Salamis
  - Battle of Plataea
  - Battle of Mycale
  - Battle of the Eurymedon
- First Peloponnesian War
  - Battle of Oenophyta
  - Battle of Coronea (447 BC)
  - Battle of Tanagra (457 BC)
- Sicilian Wars
  - Battle of Himera (480 BC)
  - Battle of Himera (409 BC)
- Peloponnesian War
  - Battle of Arginusae
  - Battle of Delium
  - Battle of Rhium
  - Battle of Sybota
  - Battle of Potidaea
  - Battle of Naupactus
  - Battle of Notium
  - Battle of Syme
  - Battle of Cynossema
  - Battle of Pylos
  - Battle of Sphacteria
  - Battle of Amphipolis
  - Battle of Mantinea (418 BC)
  - Battle of Olpae
  - Sicilian Expedition
  - Battle of Syme
  - Battle of Cyzicus
  - Battle of Aegospotami
- Corinthian War
- Battle of Coronea (394 BC)
- Battle of Naxos
- Battle of Leuctra
- Battle of Cynoscephalae
- Battle of Mantinea (362 BC)
- March of the 10,000
  - Battle of Cunaxa
- Battle of Crocus Field
- Boeotian War
- Foreign War

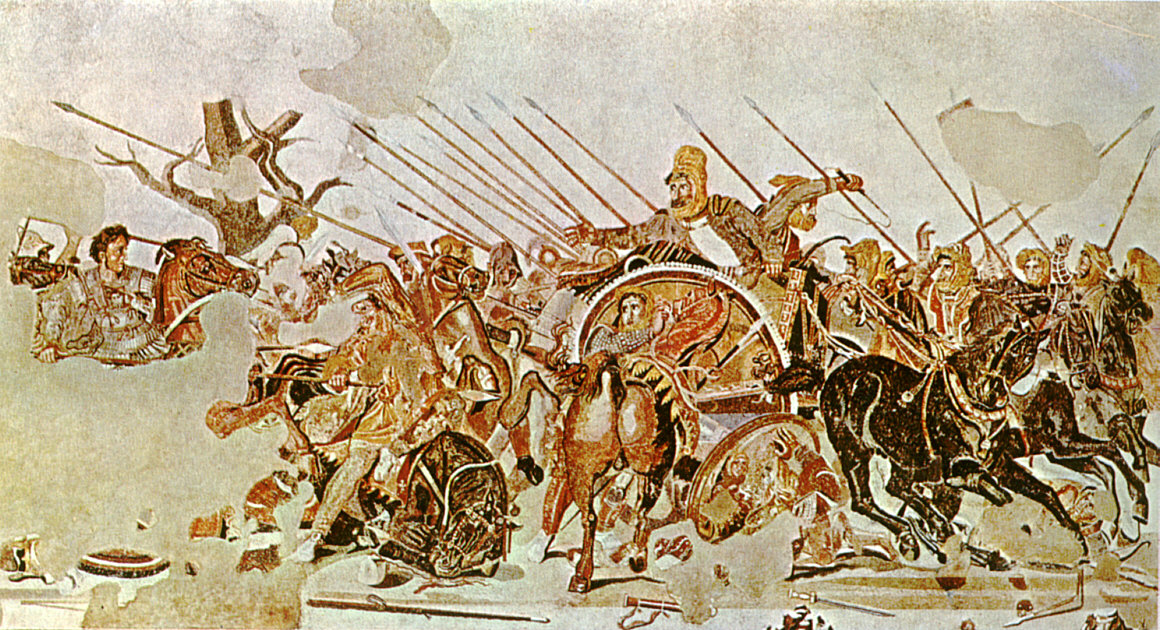
Alexander Mosaic showing the Battle of Issus; from the House of the Faun, Pompeii

- Wars of Alexander the Great
  - Battle of Chaeronea
  - Battle of the Granicus
  - Battle of Issus
  - Siege of Tyre (332 BC)
  - Battle of Gaugamela
  - Battle of the Hydaspes River
- Lamian War
  - Battle of Crannon
- Wars of the Diadochi
  - Battle of Corupedium
  - Battle of Crannon
  - Battle of Gabiene
  - Battle of Gaza (312 BC)
  - Battle of Ipsus
  - Battle of Paraitacene
  - Battle of Raphia
  - Battle of Salamis (306 BC)
- Chremonidean War
- Battle of Sellasia
- Battle of Cynoscephalae
- Battle of Asculum
- Cretan War
- Macedonian Wars
  - First Macedonian War
  - Second Macedonian War
  - Third Macedonian War
    - Battle of Pydna
  - Fourth Macedonian War
    - Battle of Pydna (148 BC)
- Achaean War
  - Battle of Corinth (146 BC)

== General history of ancient Greece ==
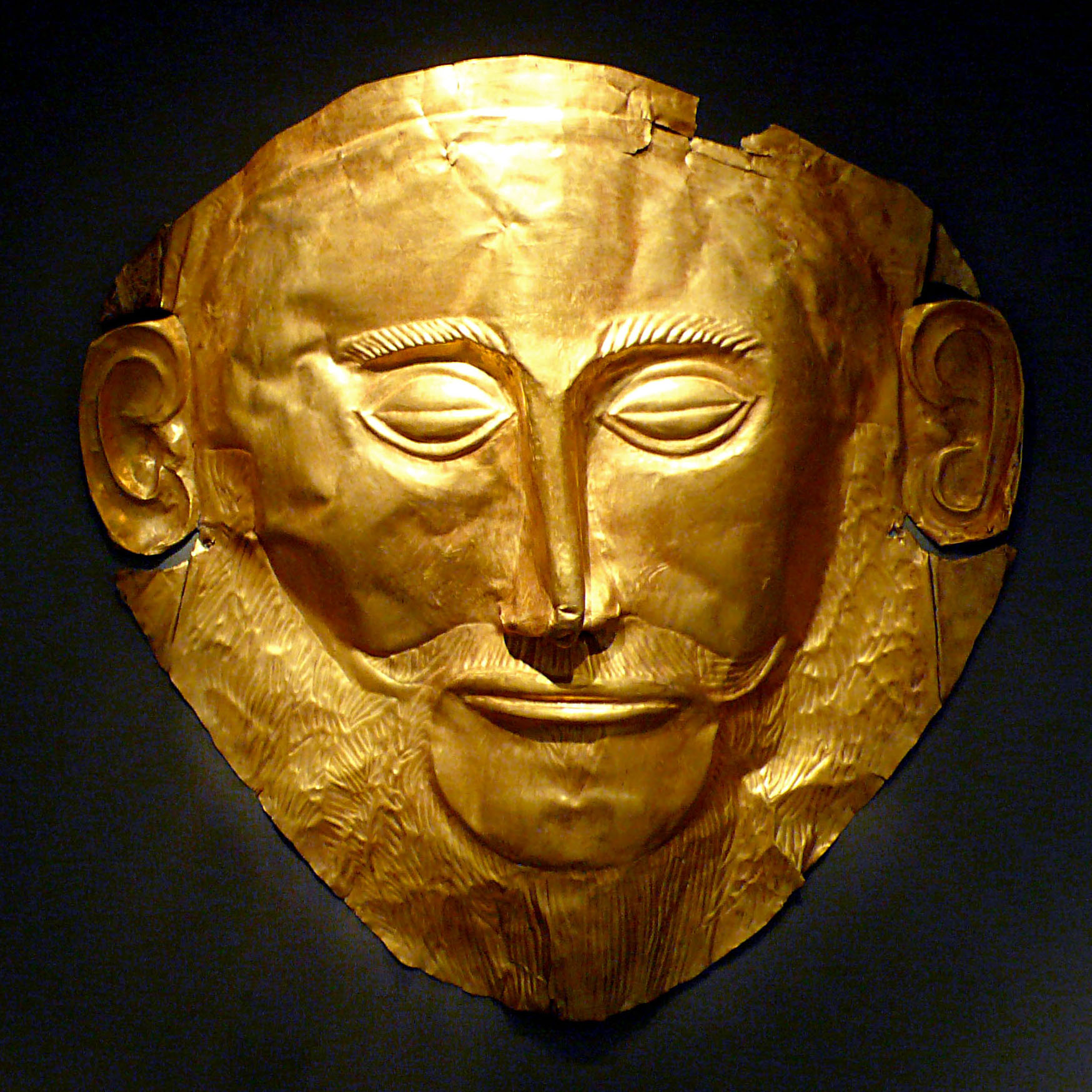
Death mask, known as the Mask of Agamemnon, 16th century BC, probably the most famous artifact of Mycenaean Greece

- Timeline of ancient Greece

=== Ancient Greek history, by period ===
- Prehistoric Greek history
  - Neolithic Greece
  - Aegean Bronze Age
  - Helladic chronology
    - Eutresis culture
    - Korakou culture
    - Mycenaean Greece
    - Late Bronze Age collapse
      - Dorian invasion
  - Greek Dark Ages
    - Iron Age Greek migrations
- History of ancient Greece (timeline)
  - Archaic Greece
    - Greek colonisation
    - Rise of the polis
    - Greco-Persian Wars
      - Siege of Naxos (499 BC)
      - Ionian Revolt
        - Battle of Ephesus (498 BC)
      - First Persian invasion of Greece
      - Second Persian invasion of Greece
      - Pentecontaetia
  - Classical Greece
  - Hellenistic Greece
  - Roman Greece

=== Ancient Greek history, by region ===
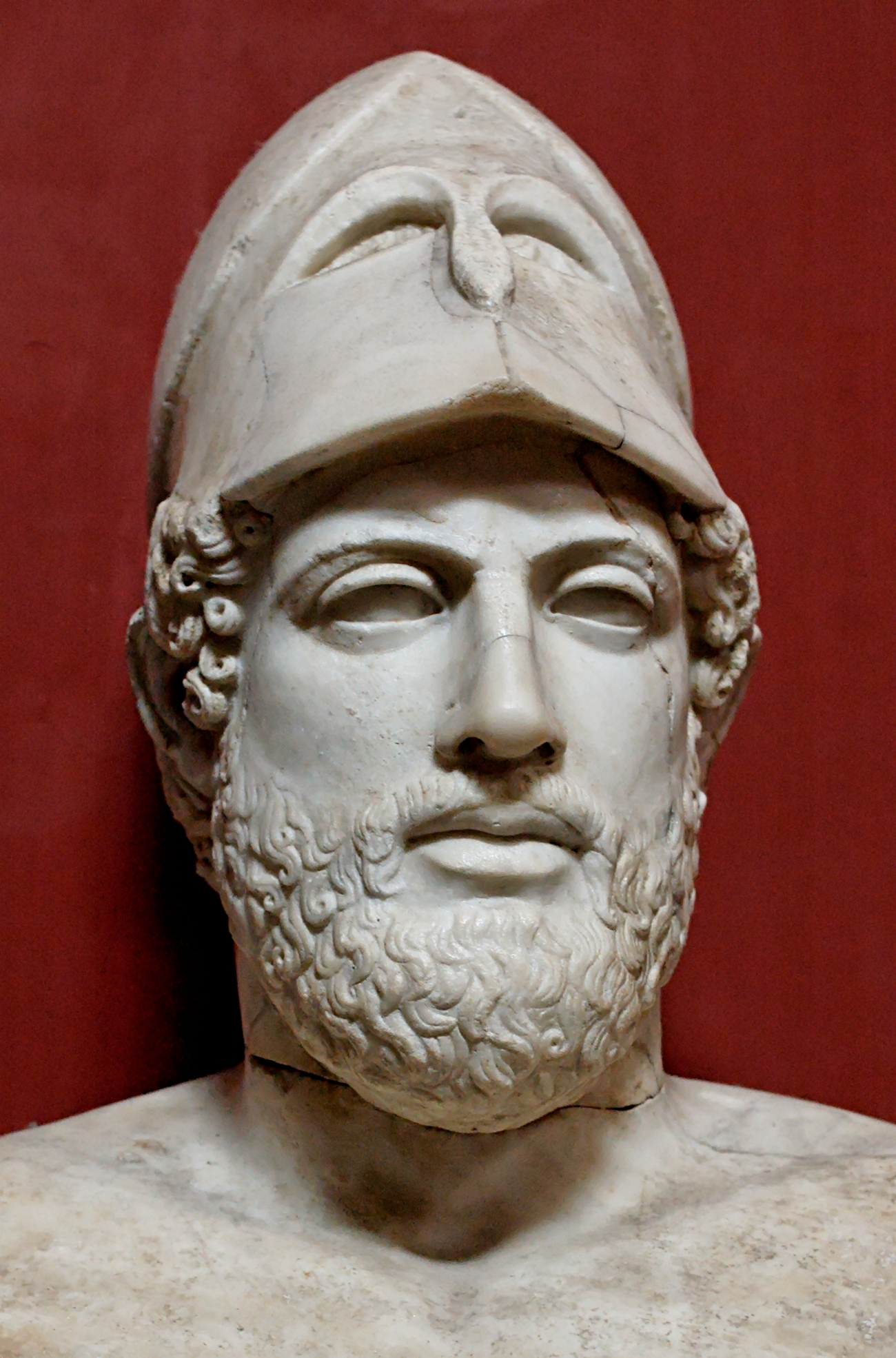
Bust of Pericles, marble Roman copy after a Greek original from c. 430 BC

- Ancient Athens
  - Athenian democracy – democracy in the Greek city-state of Athens developed around the fifth century BC, making Athens one of the first known democracies in the world, comprising the city of Athens and the surrounding territory of Attica. It was a system of direct democracy, in which eligible citizens voted directly on legislation and executive bills.
    - Solon (c. 638 – c. 558 BC)– Athenian statesman, lawmaker, and poet. Legislated against political, economic, and moral decline in archaic Athens. His reforms failed in the short term, yet he is often credited with having laid the foundations for Athenian democracy.
    - Cleisthenes (born around 570 BC). – father of Athenian democracy. He reformed the constitution of ancient Athens and set it on a democratic footing in 508/7 BC.
    - Ephialtes (died 461 BC) – led the democratic revolution against the Athenian aristocracy, which exerted control through the Areopagus, the most powerful body in the state. Ephialtes proposed a reduction of the Areopagus' powers, and the Ecclesia (the Athenian Assembly) adopted Ephialtes' proposal without opposition. This reform signaled the beginning of a new era of "radical democracy" for which Athens would become famous.
    - Pericles – arguably the most prominent and influential Greek statesman. When Ephialtes was assassinated for overthrowing the elitist Council of the Aeropagus, his deputy Pericles stepped in. He was elected strategos (one of ten such posts) in 445 BCE, which he held continuously until his death in 429 BCE, always by election of the Athenian Assembly. The period during which he led Athens, roughly from 461 to 429 BC, is known as the "Age of Pericles".
    - Ostracism – procedure under the Athenian democracy in which any citizen could be expelled from the city-state of Athens for ten years.
    - Areopagus – council of elders of Athens, similar to the Roman Senate. Like the Senate, its membership was restricted to those who had held high public office, in this case that of Archon. In 594 BC, the Areopagus agreed to hand over its functions to Solon for reform.
    - Ecclesia – principal assembly of the democracy of ancient Athens during its "Golden Age" (480–404 BCE). It was the popular assembly, open to all male citizens with 2 years of military service. In 594 BC, Solon allowed all Athenian citizens to participate, regardless of class, even the thetes (manual laborers).
- History of Sparta
- History of Macedonia (ancient kingdom)
- History of Crete#Iron Age and Archaic Crete
- Asia Minor#Greek West
- History of Greek and Hellenistic Sicily
- Greeks in pre-Roman Gaul
  - History of Marseille#Antiquity
- Cyrenaica#Greek rule
- Bosporan Kingdom
- Ptolemaic Kingdom
  - Cyrenaica#Resumption of Greek rule
- Coele-Syria
- Seleucid Empire
  - Tylos
- Greco-Bactrian Kingdom
- Indo-Greek Kingdom

=== Ancient Greek History, by subject ===
- History of the Greek alphabet
- Names of the Greeks

=== Works on ancient Greek history ===
- History of the Peloponnesian War

== Culture of ancient Greece ==
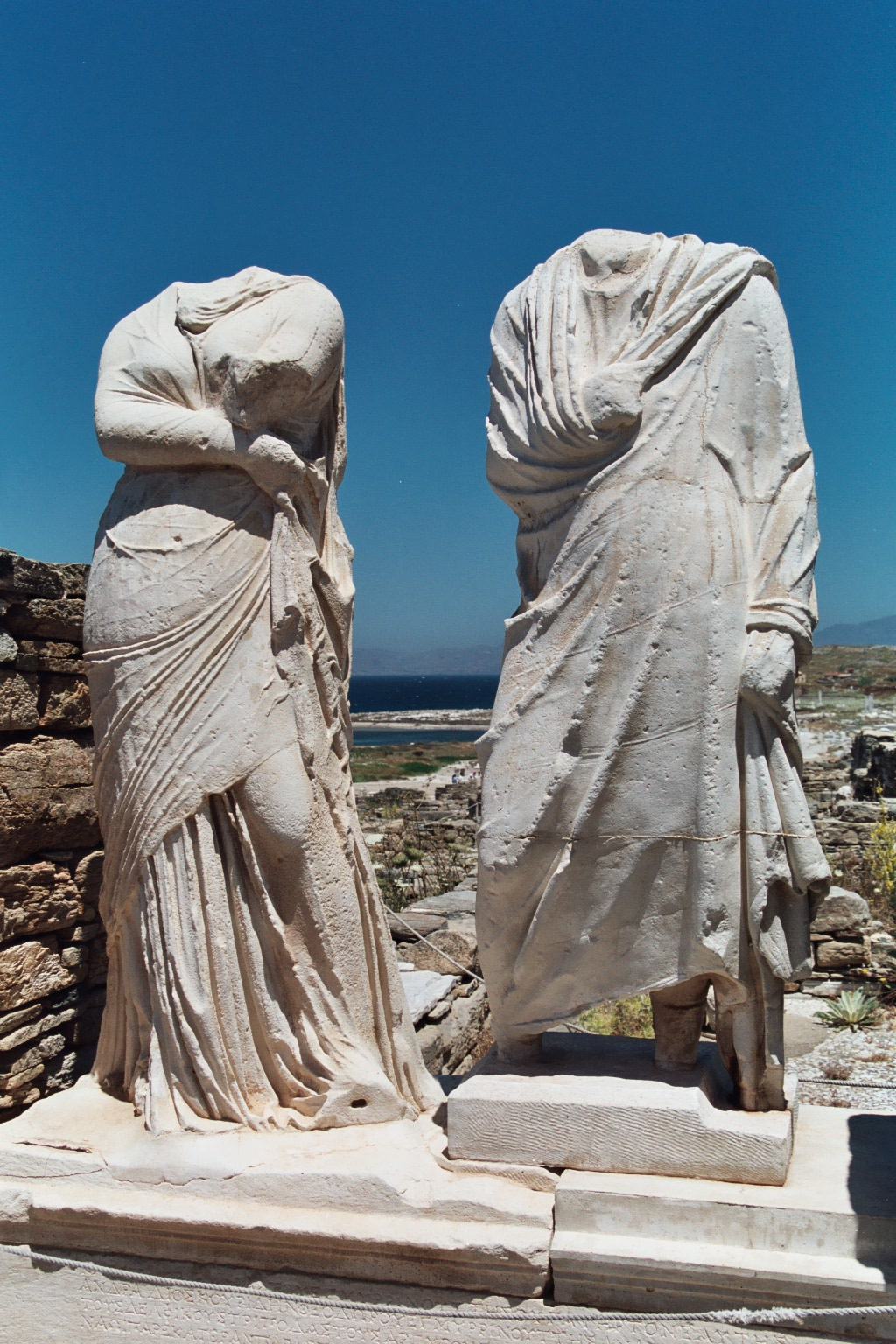
Statues at the "House of Cleopatra" in Delos, Greece. Man and woman wearing the himation

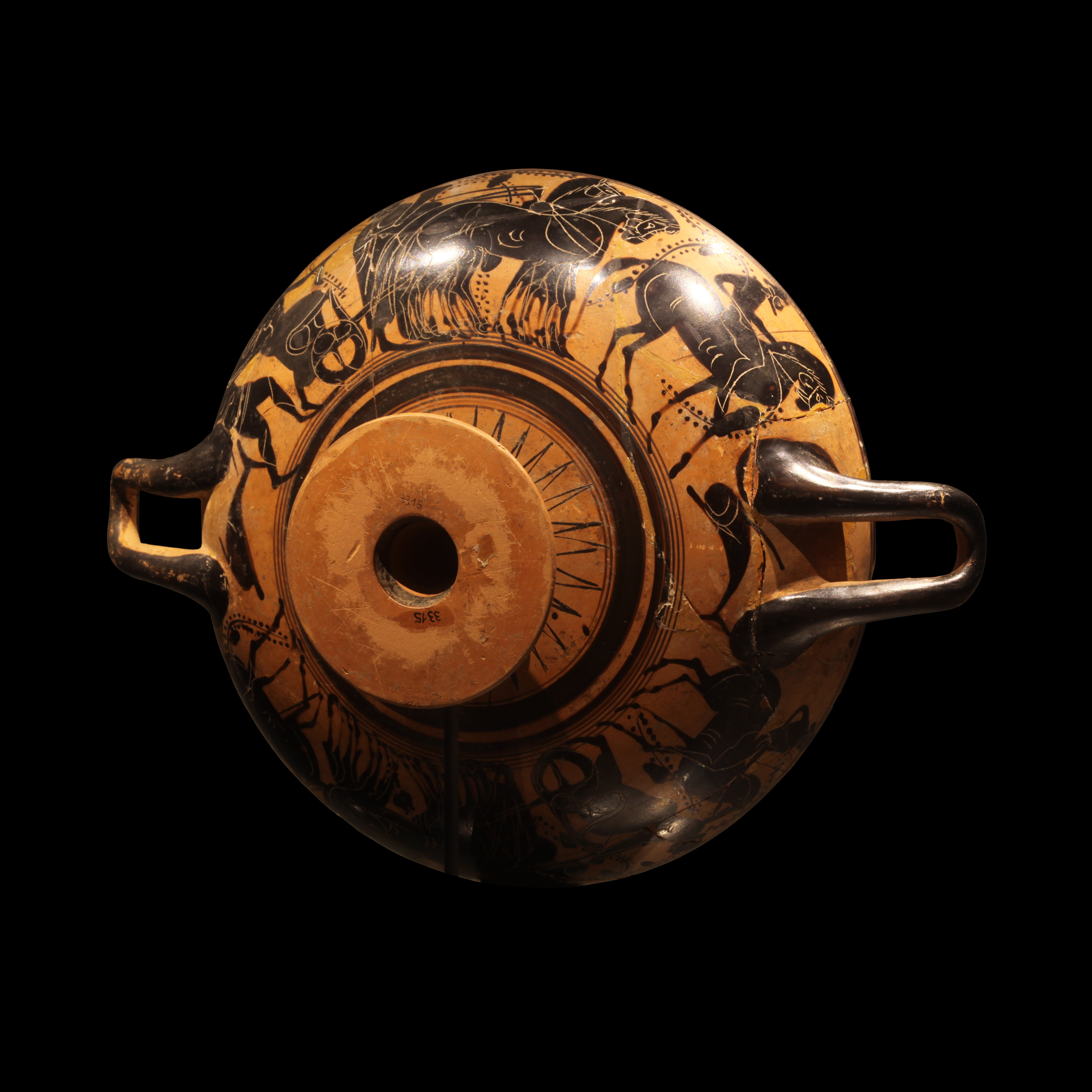
Kylix, the most common drinking vessel in ancient Greece

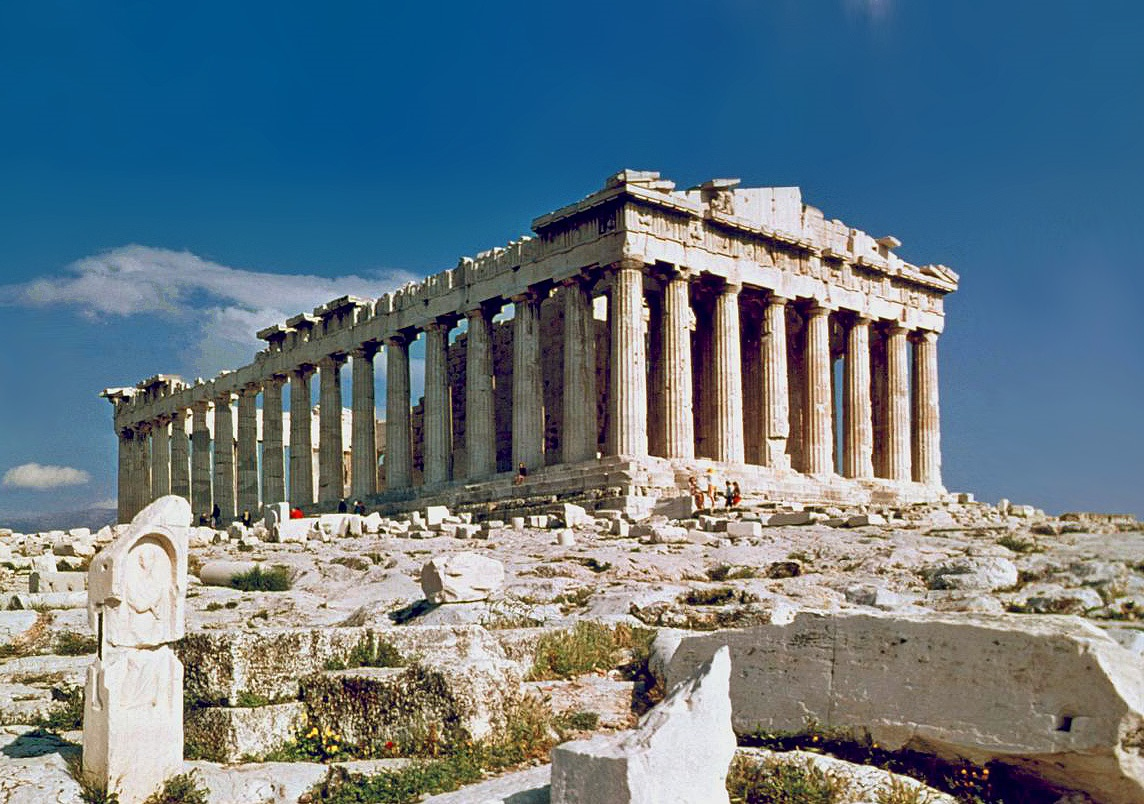
The Parthenon, shows the common structural features of Ancient Greek architecture: crepidoma, columns, entablature, and pediment

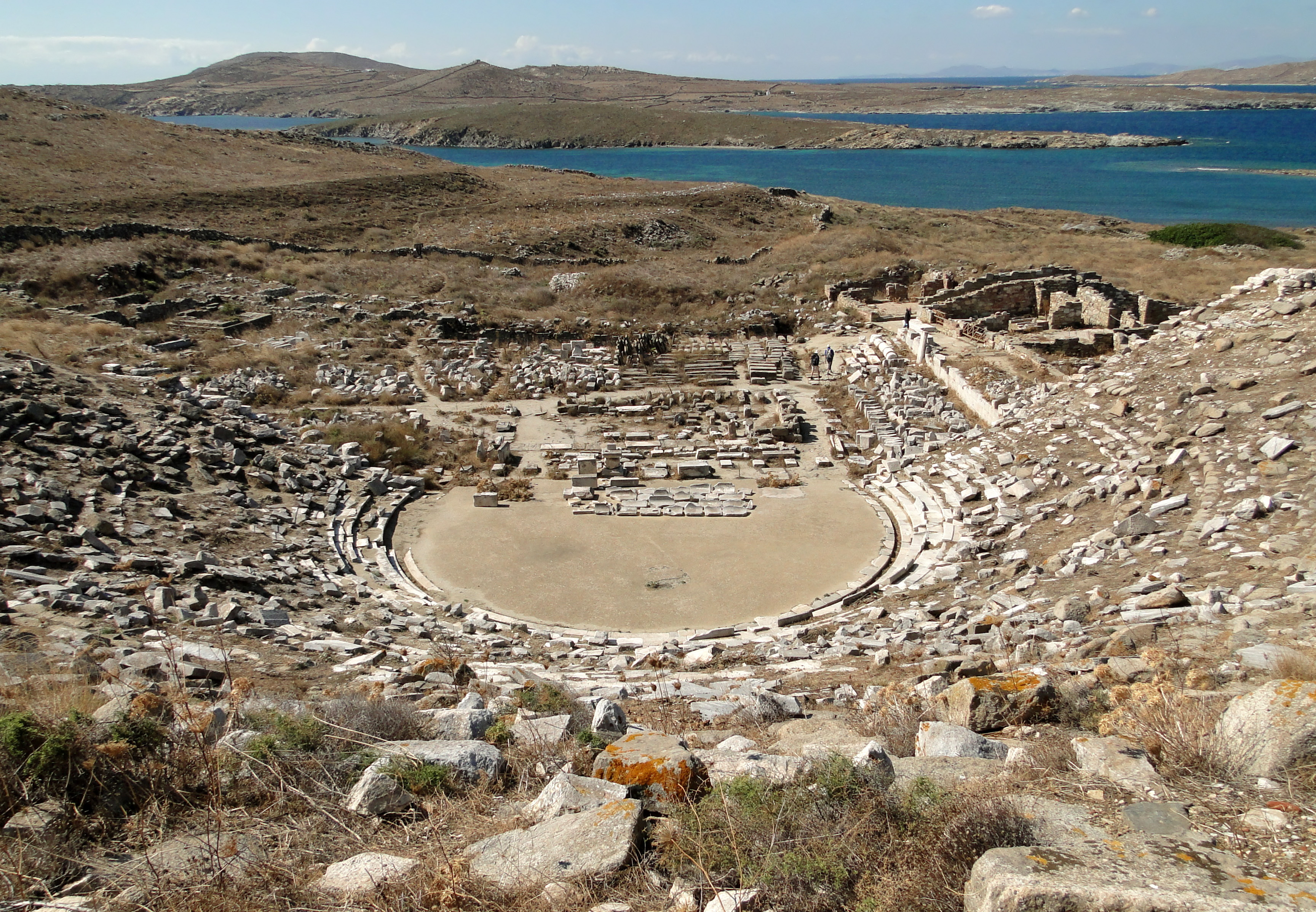
Ancient Greek theatre in Delos

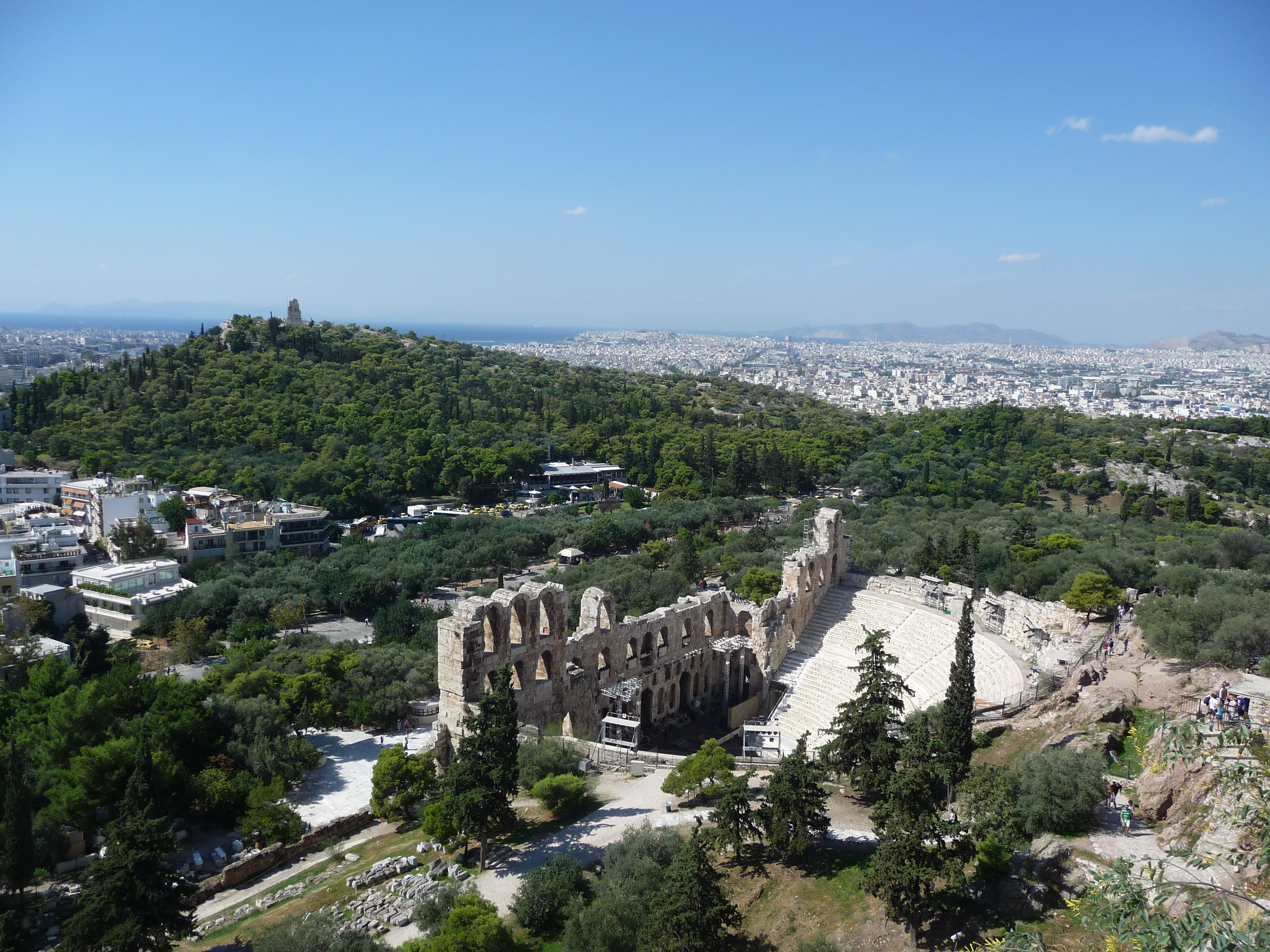
Odeon of Herodes Atticus

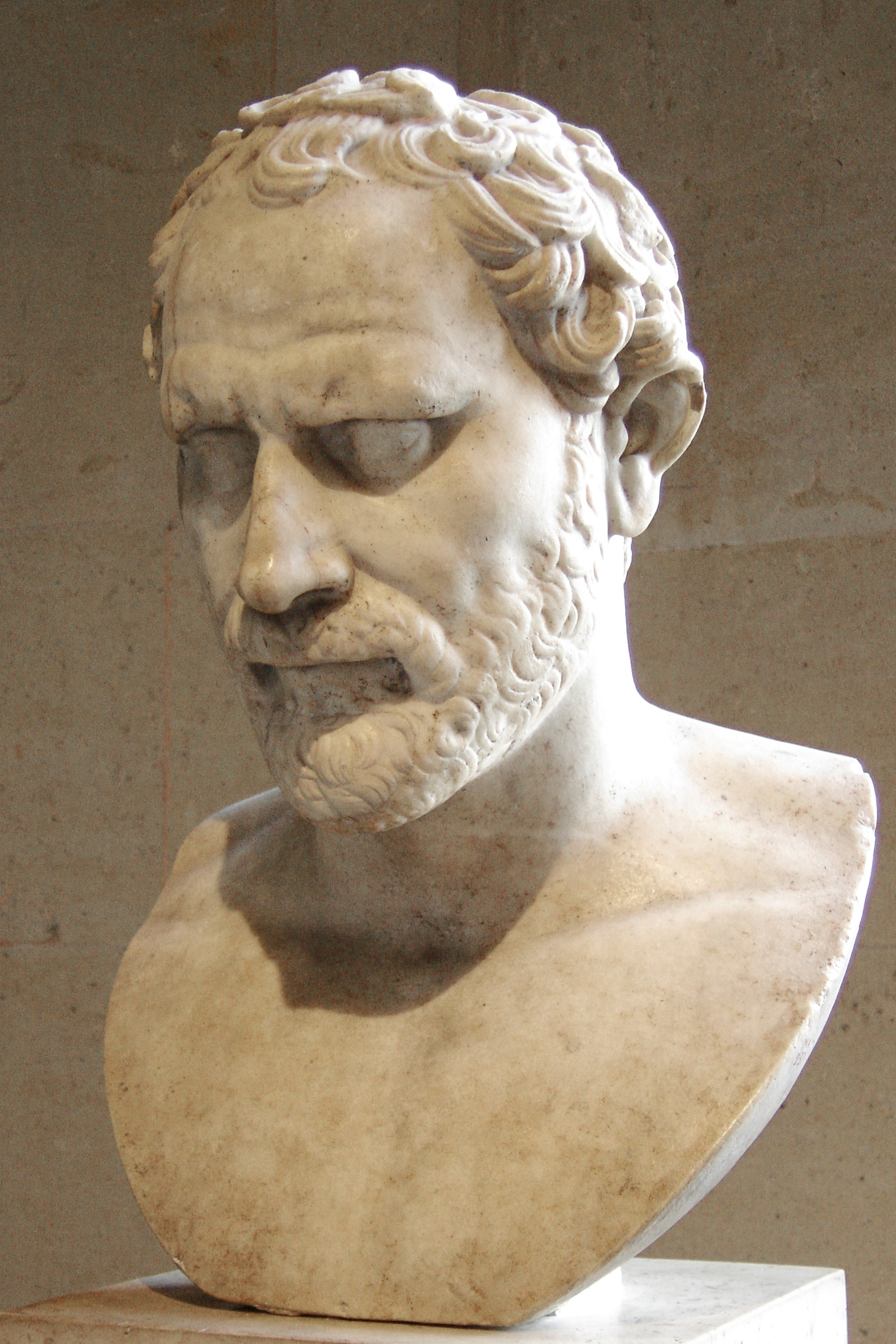
Portrait of Demosthenes, statesman and orator of ancient Athens

Culture of ancient Greece

- Ancient Greek calendars
  - Attic calendar
- Clothing in ancient Greece
  - Chiton
  - Chlamys
  - Exomis
  - Himation
  - Kolpos
  - Peplos
  - Tainia
  - Zone
  - Zoster
- Clubs in ancient Greece
- Coinage of ancient Greece
- Cuisine of ancient Greece
  - Kykeon
  - Wine in ancient Greece
    - Symposium
      - Kottabos
    - Syssitia
- Education in ancient Greece
  - Paideia
- Fiction set in ancient Greece
- Greek gardens
- Marriage in ancient Greece
- People in ancient Greece
  - Ancient Greeks
    - Seven Sages of Greece
      - Cleobulus of Lindos
      - Solon of Athens
      - Chilon of Sparta
      - Bias of Priene
      - Thales of Miletus
      - Pittacus of Mytilene (c. 640 – 568 BC)
      - Periander of Corinth (fl. 627 BC)
    - Ancient Greek tribes
  - Ancient Greek personal names
- Sexuality in ancient Greece
  - Adultery in Classical Athens
  - Homosexuality in ancient Greece
    - Homosexuality in the militaries of ancient Greece
  - Pederasty in ancient Greece
    - Athenian pederasty
  - Prostitution in ancient Greece
- Slavery in ancient Greece
- Women in Classical Athens

=== Architecture of ancient Greece ===
Architecture of ancient Greece

- Acropolis
  - Acropolis of Athens
- Agora
  - Ancient Agora of Athens
- Ancient Greek baths
  - Greek baths of Gela
  - Greek Baths in ancient Olympia
- Delphinion
- Metroon
- Odeon
  - Odeon of Athens
  - Odeon of Herodes Atticus
- Propylaea
- Ancient Greek roofs
- Stoa
  - Ancient Greek stoae
    - Stoa of Attalos
- Ancient Greek temple
  - Ancient Greek temples
    - Parthenon
    - Temple of Artemis
    - Temple of Zeus
    - Temple of Hephaestus
    - Samothrace temple complex
- Ancient Greek walls

=== Art in ancient Greece ===
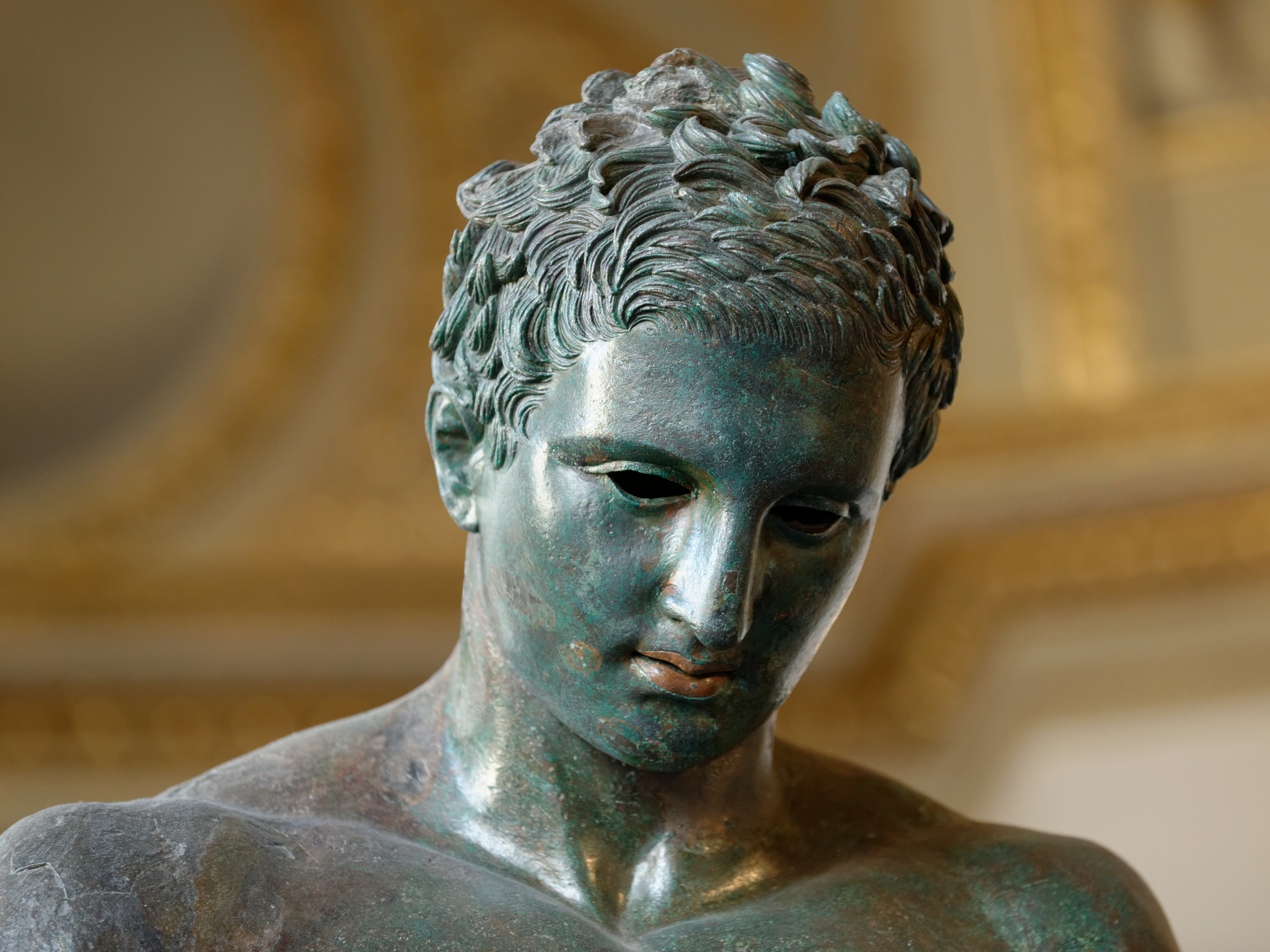
Croatian Apoxyomenos (detail), bronze statue from the 2nd or 1st century BC

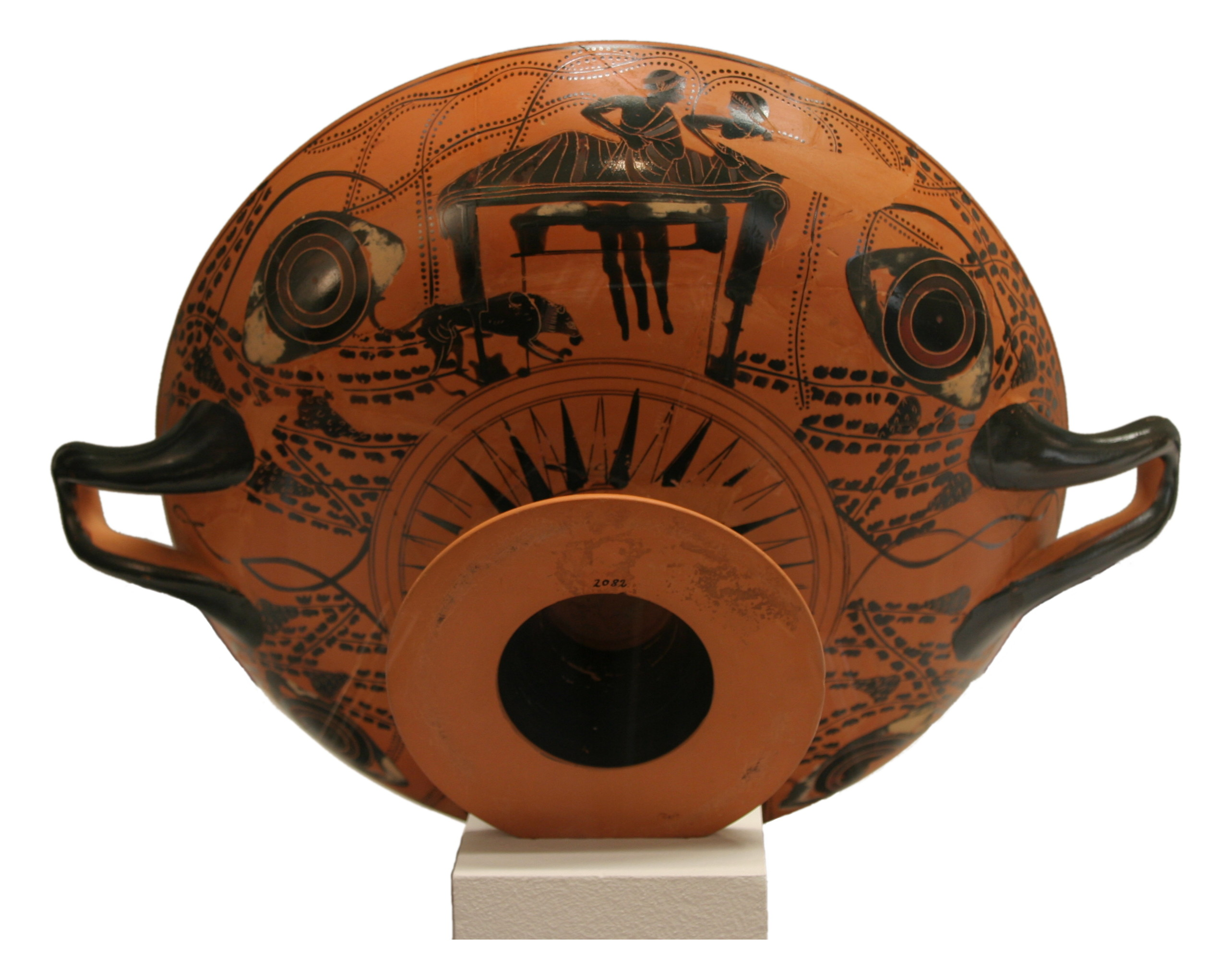
Two youths feasting in a vineyard. Attic black-figure kylix, ca. 530 BC

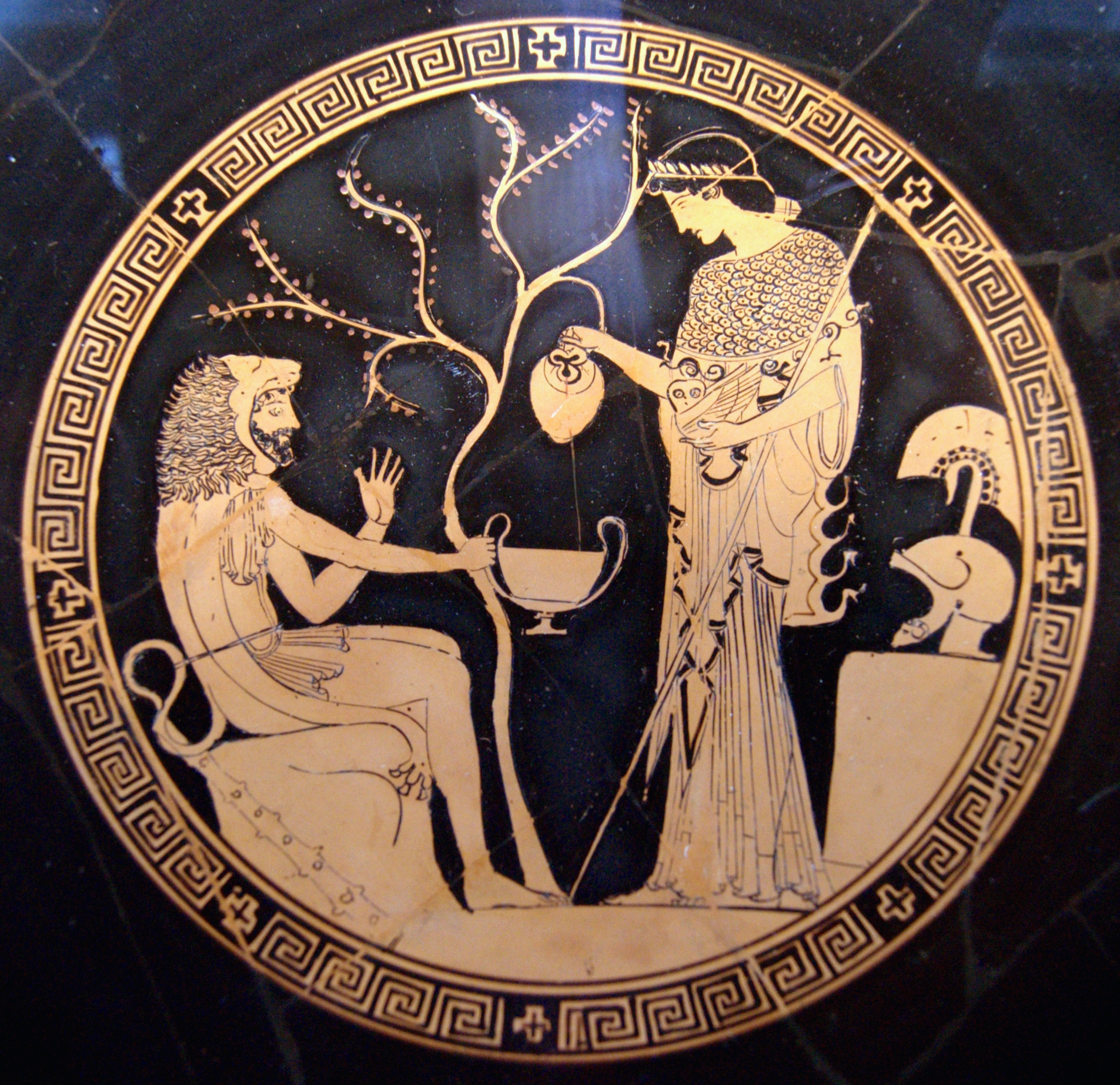
Tondo of a red-figure kylix depicting Herakles and Athena, by Phoinix (potter) and Douris (painter), ca. 480–470 BC

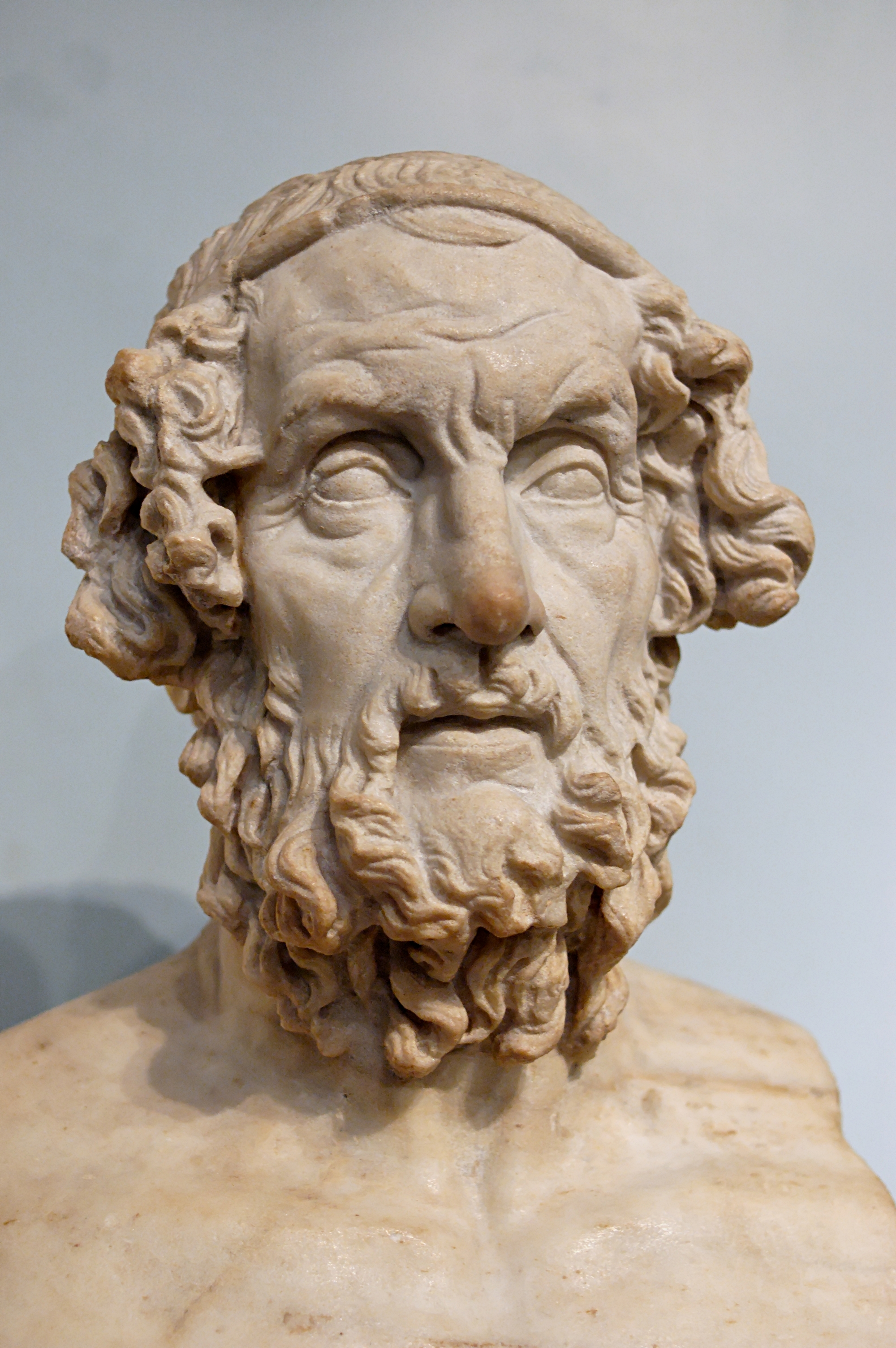
Bust of Homer, author of the Iliad and the Odyssey, two epic poems which are the central works of ancient Greek literature

Art in ancient Greece

- Death in ancient Greek art
- Music of ancient Greece
  - Musical system of ancient Greece
    - Ancient Greek Musical Notation
  - Seikilos epitaph
- Painting in ancient Greece
- Pottery of ancient Greece
  - Ancient Greek vase painting
    - Bilingual vase painting
    - Black-figure pottery
    - Red-figure pottery
    - White ground technique
  - Greek terracotta figurines
    - Tanagra figurine
  - Hellenistic glass
- Sculpture in ancient Greece
  - Severe style
  - Hellenistic art
- Sport in ancient Greek art
- Theatre of ancient Greece
  - Chorus of the elderly in classical Greek drama
  - Greek comedy
    - Old Comedy
  - Greek tragedy
  - Greek chorus
  - Satyr play
  - List of ancient Greek playwrights
  - List of ancient Greek theatres
  - Phlyax play
  - Representation of women in Athenian tragedy
  - Use of costume in Athenian tragedy
- Warfare in ancient Greek art

==== Literature in ancient Greece ====
Literature in ancient Greece

- Greek lyric
- Greek novel
- Writers
  - Aeschylus
  - Aesop
  - Aristophanes
  - Euripides
  - Herodotus
  - Hesiod
  - Homer
  - Lucian
  - Menander
  - Pindar
  - Plutarch
  - Polybius
  - Sappho
  - Sophocles
  - Theognis of Megara
  - Thucydides
  - Xenophon

==== Philosophy in ancient Greece ====
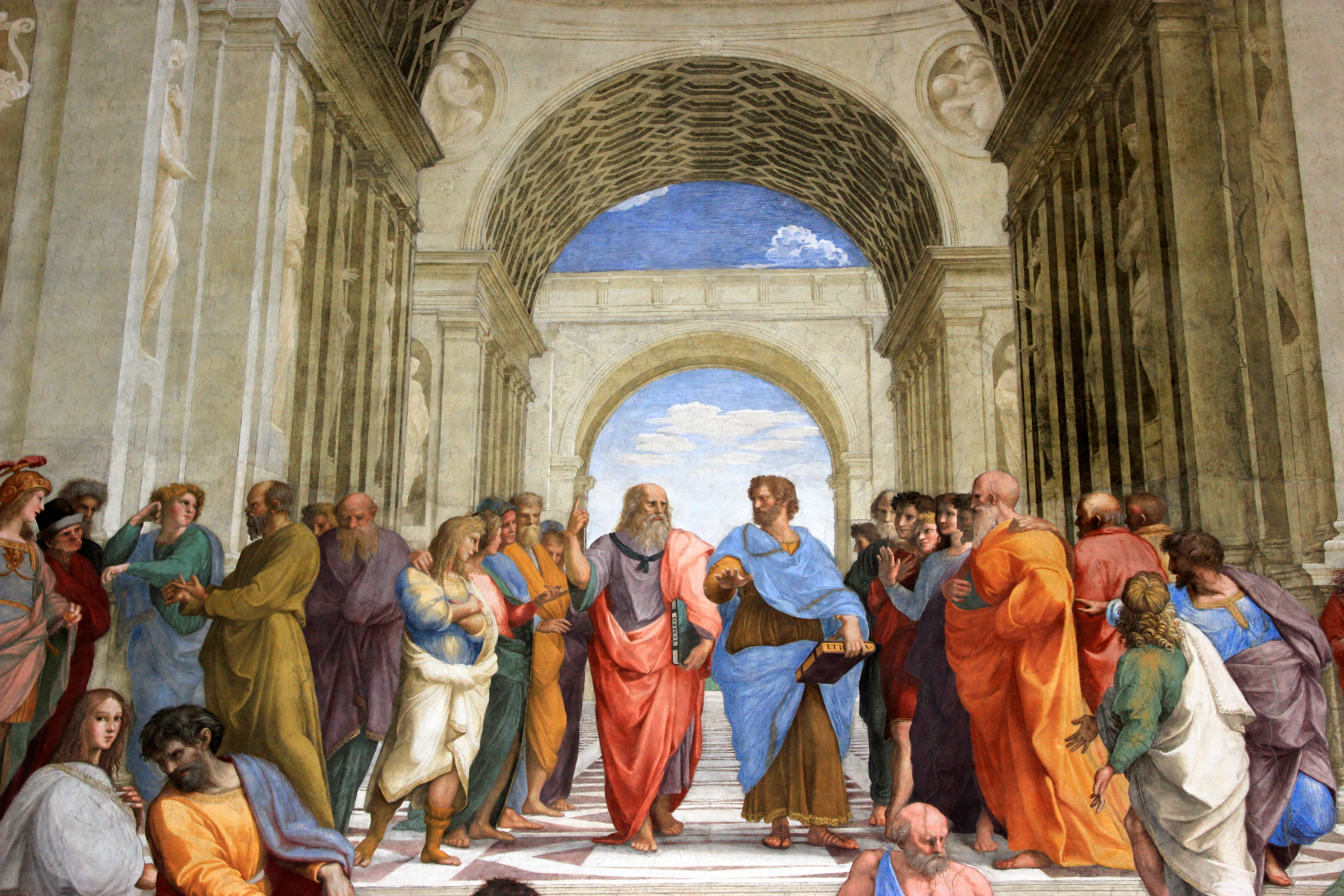
The School of Athens, a famous fresco by the Italian Renaissance artist Raphael, with Plato and Aristotle as the central figures in the scene

Philosophy in ancient Greece

Ancient Greek schools of philosophy

- Pre-Socratic
  - Atomism
  - Eleatics
  - Ephesian school
  - Ionian School
  - Milesian school
  - Pluralist school
  - Pythagoreanism

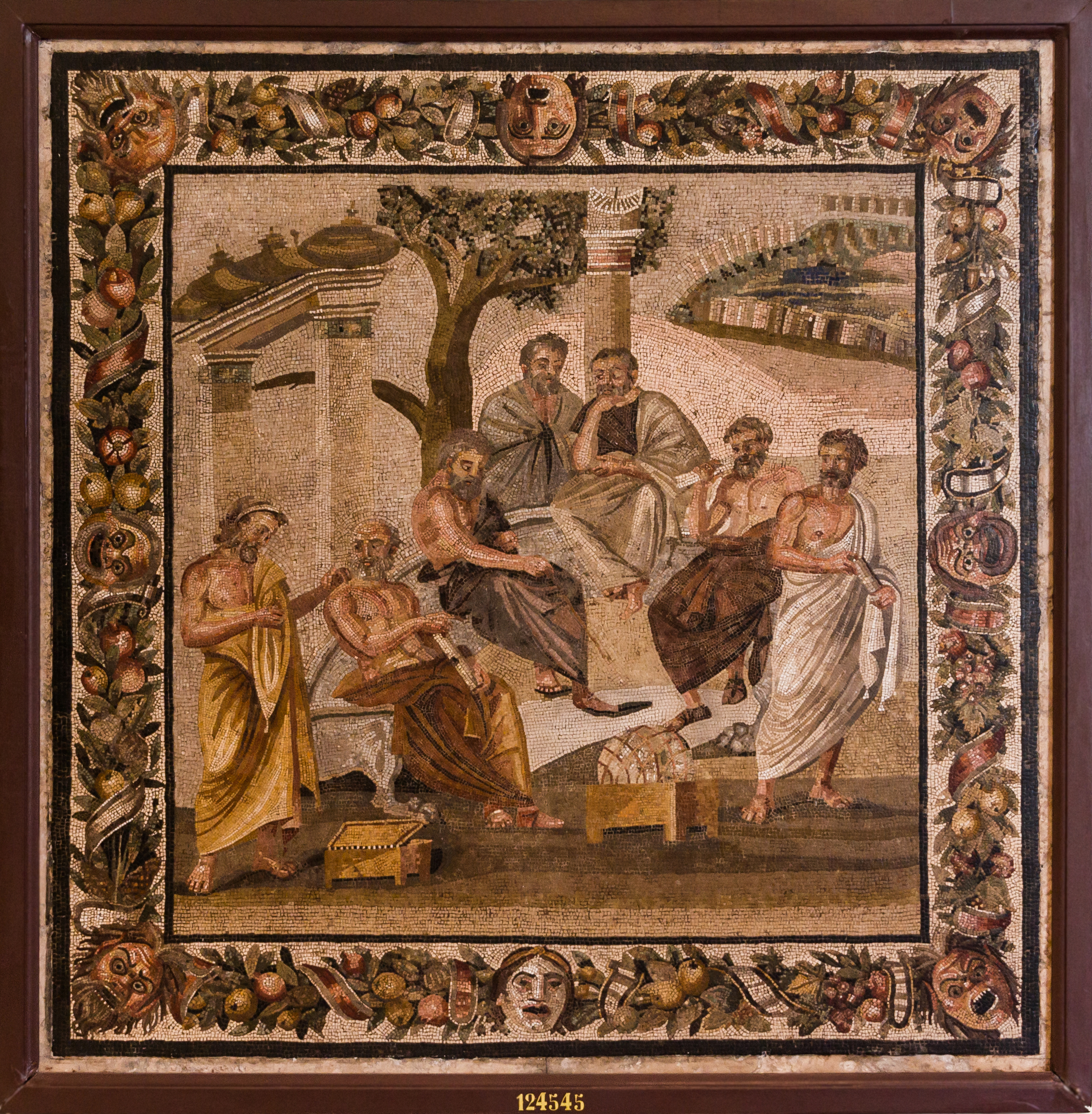
Platonism: Plato's Academy mosaic from the Villa of T. Siminius Stephanus in Pompeii

- Classical Greek
  - Aristotelianism
  - Cynicism
  - Cyrenaics
  - Eretrian school
  - Megarian school
  - Peripatetic school
  - Platonism
- Hellenistic
  - Academic skepticism
  - Epicureanism
  - Middle Platonism
  - Neoplatonism
    - Neopythagoreanism
  - Pyrrhonism
  - Stoicism

Roman copy in marble of a Greek bronze bust of Aristotle by Lysippus, c. 330 BC

Philosophers of ancient Greece

- Anaxagoras
- Anaximander
- Anaximenes
- Antisthenes
- Aristotle
- Democritus
- Diogenes
- Empedocles
- Epicurus
- Heraclitus
- Leucippus
- Gorgias
- Parmenides
- Plato
- Protagoras
- Pythagoras
- Socrates
- Thales
- Zeno

=== Language in ancient Greece ===
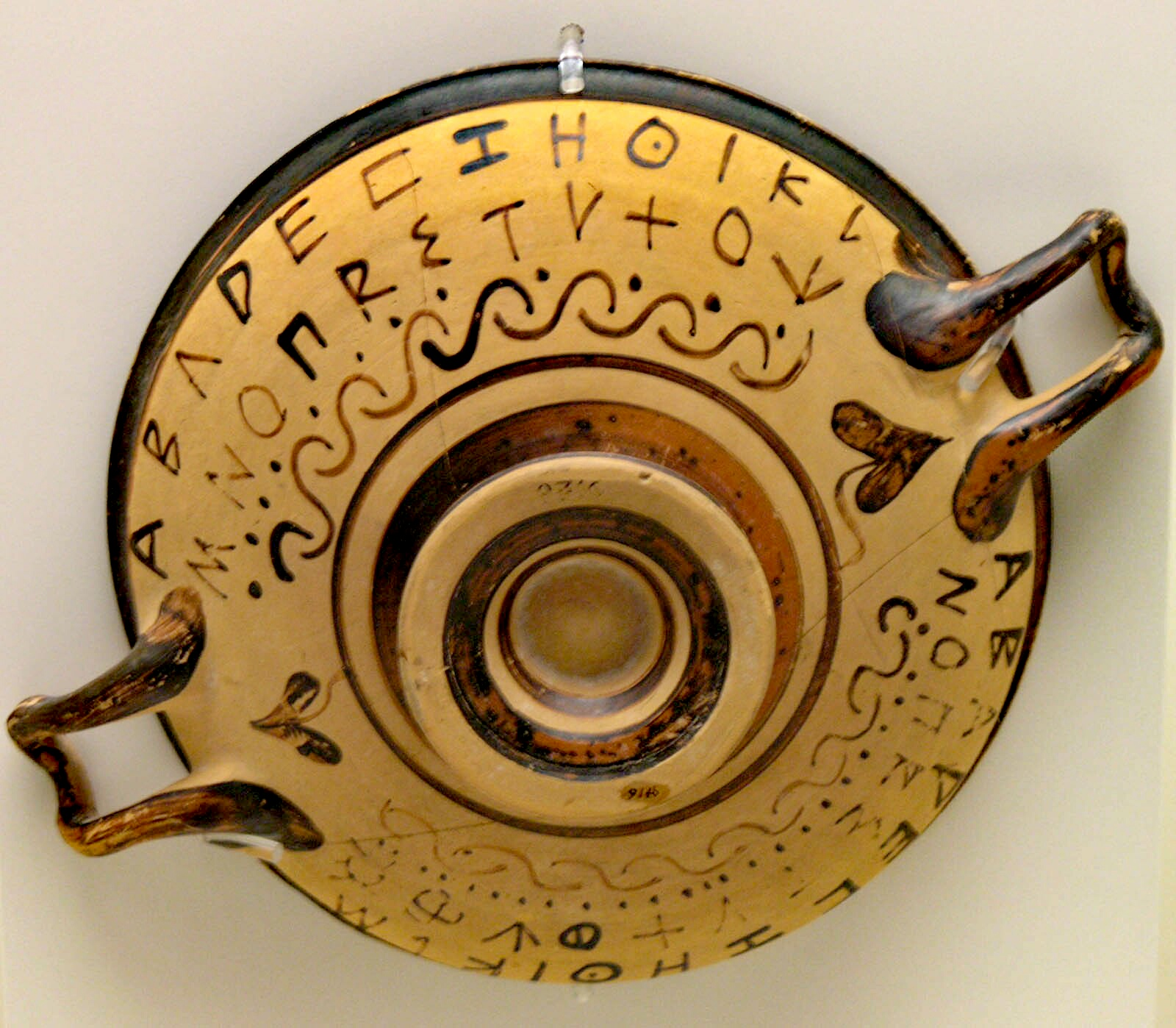
Early Greek alphabet on pottery

Ancient Greek

- Ancient Greek, by period
  - Mycenaean Greek language
  - Homeric Greek
  - Old Greek
    - Koine Greek
    - Late Greek
- Ancient Greek dialects
  - Aeolic Greek
  - Arcadocypriot Greek
  - Attic Greek
  - Doric Greek
  - Ionic Greek
  - Locrian Greek
  - Ancient Macedonian language
- Ancient Greek grammar
- Ancient Greek phonology
- Greek alphabet
  - Archaic Greek alphabets
  - Greek letters used in mathematics, science, and engineering
- Greek diacritics
- Greek inscriptions
- Greek Numbers
- Greek numerals
- Greek orthography
- Greek phrases
- Greek verbs
- Greek words for love
  - Eros

=== Religion in ancient Greece ===
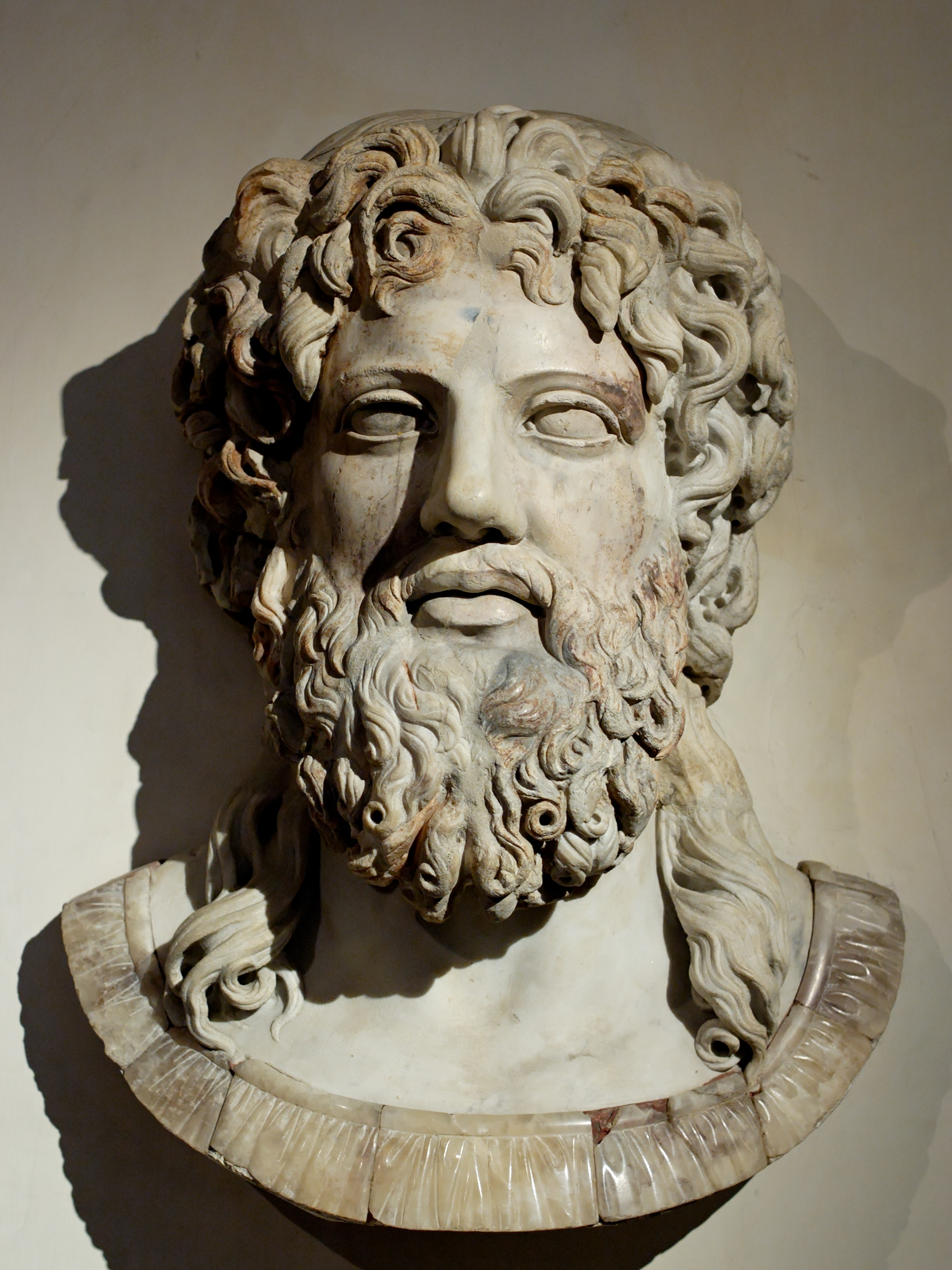
Zeus, king of the Olympian Gods

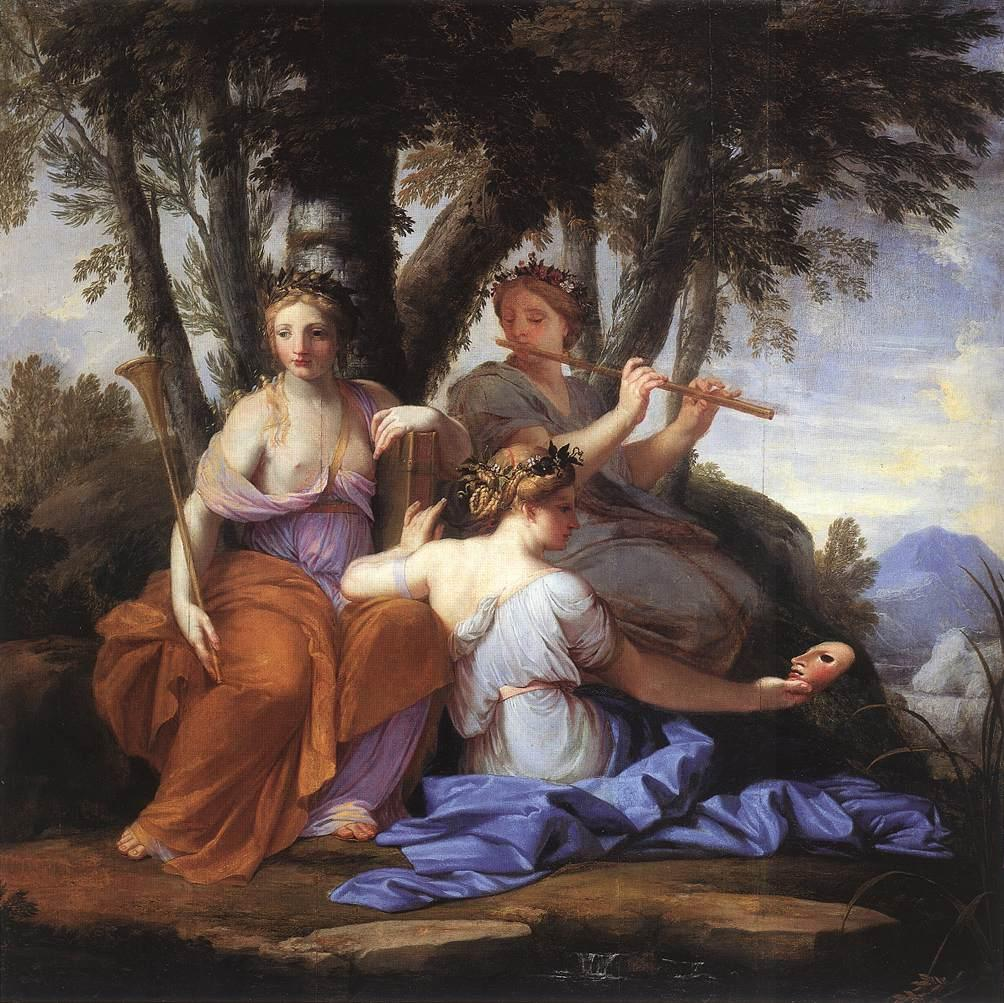
The Muses Clio, Euterpe, and Thalia, the inspirational Goddesses of literature, science, and the arts in Greek mythology (by Eustache Le Sueur, oil on panel, c. 1650s)

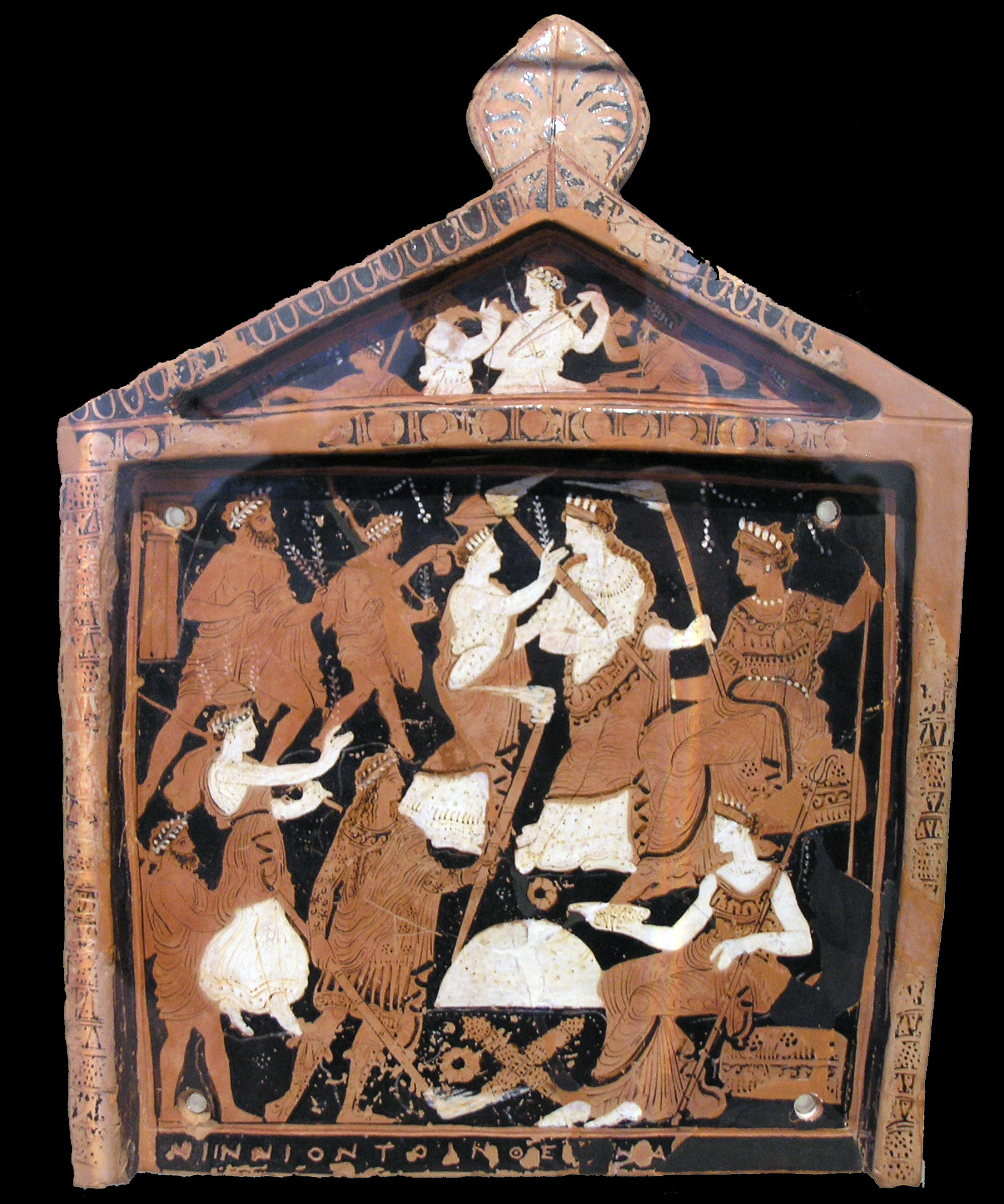
A votive plaque known as the Ninnion Tablet depicting elements of the Eleusinian Mysteries, discovered in the sanctuary at Eleusis (mid-4th century BC)

Religion in ancient Greece

- Twelve Olympians
- Greek mythology
  - Modern understanding of Greek mythology
  - Greek deities
    - Family tree of the Greek gods
    - Greek primordial deities
  - Mortals in Greek mythology
  - Greek mythological creatures
    - Dragons in Greek mythology
  - Greek mythology in popular culture
  - Greek mythology in western art and literature
  - Greek underworld
  - Upper World
- Religious practices
  - Amphidromia
  - Ceremonies of ancient Greece
  - Greek divination
  - Animal sacrifice
    - Buphonia
    - Holocaust (sacrifice)
    - Hecatomb
  - Ancient Greek funeral and burial practices
    - Ancient Greek funerary vases
    - Funeral oration
  - Greek hero cult
  - Hieros gamos in ancient Greece
  - Festivals
    - Athenian festivals
      - Anthesteria
      - Kronia
      - Lenaia
    - Daphnephoria
    - Dionysia
    - Dionysian Mysteries
    - Eleusinian Mysteries
    - Pamboeotia
    - Panathenaic Games
    - Panhellenic Games
      - Ancient Olympic Games
    - Thesmophoria
- Ancient Greek religious titles (priests)
  - Archon basileus
  - Asclepiad (title)
  - Hierophylakes
  - Iatromantis
- Hellenistic religion
  - Decline of Greco-Roman polytheism

=== Sport in ancient Greece ===
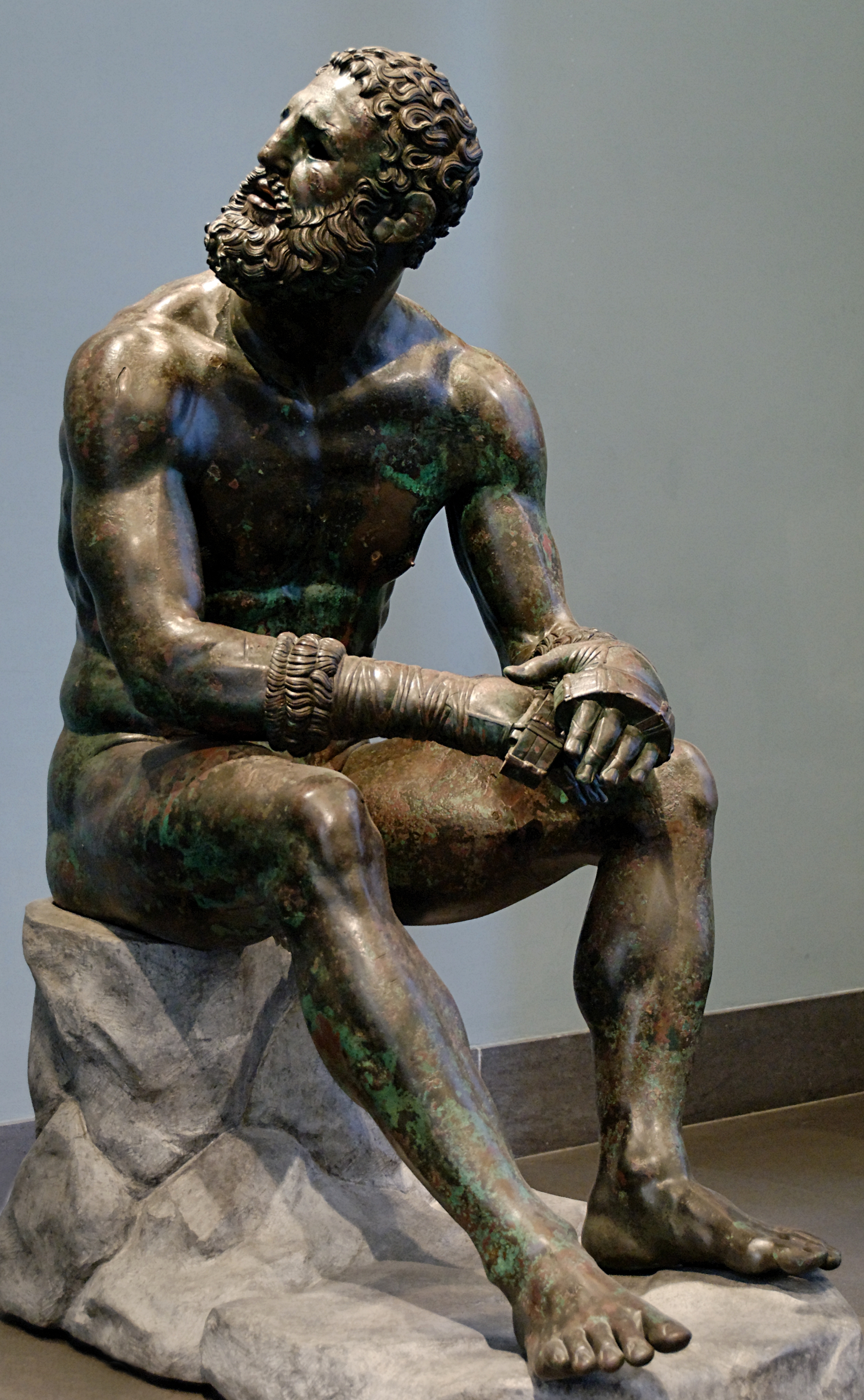
Boxer at Rest, finest example of bronze Hellenistic sculpture

- Ancient Greek Olympic festivals
- Panhellenic Games
  - Olympic Games of ancient Greece
    - Ancient Olympic pentathlon
    - Pankration
  - Isthmian Games
  - Nemean Games
  - Pythian Games

Sports

- Boxing
- Episkyros
- Kottabos
- Running
- Wrestling

Equipment

- Halteres

Stadiums

- Kourion

Training facilities

- Gymnasium
- Palaestra

== Economy of ancient Greece ==
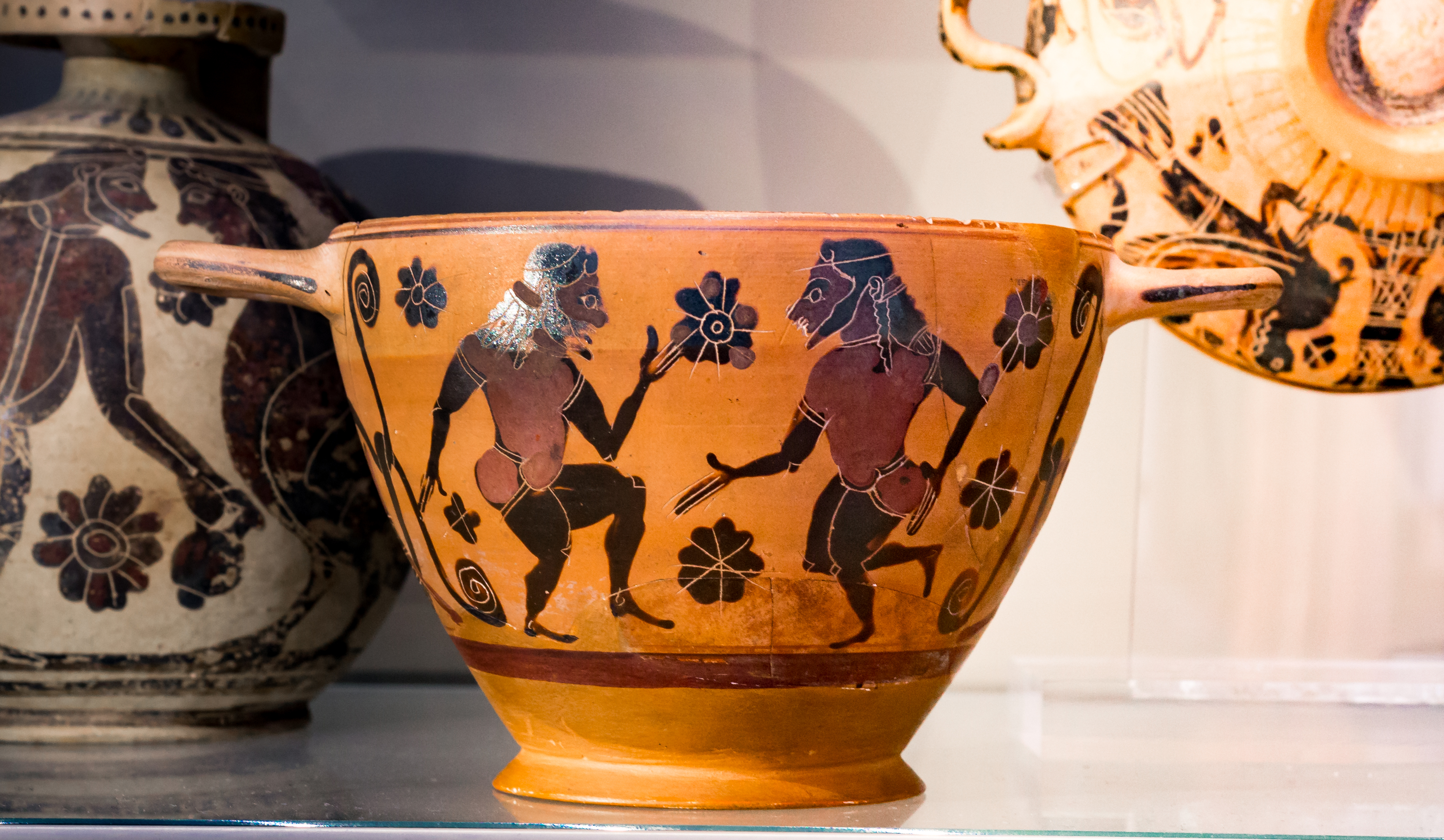
Ancient Greek pottery

Economy of ancient Greece

- Agriculture in ancient Greece
- Pottery of ancient Greece

== Health in ancient Greece ==
- Medicine in ancient Greece
  - Food and diet in ancient medicine
  - Mental illness in ancient Greece

== Science of ancient Greece ==
- Ancient Greek science
- Greek astronomy
  - Antikythera mechanism
- Greek mathematics
  - List of Greek mathematicians
    - Chronology of ancient Greek mathematicians
    - Timeline of Ancient Greek mathematicians

== Technology of ancient Greece ==
Ancient Greek technology

- Units of measurement in ancient Greece

== See also ==
- Outline of classical studies
- Outline of ancient Rome
- Outline of ancient Egypt
- Index of ancient Greece-related articles
