= Glisas =

Town of ancient Boeotia

Coordinates: 38°23′31″N 23°23′49″E

Glisas (Ancient Greek: Γλίσας), or Glissas (Γλίσσας), was a town of ancient Boeotia, mentioned by Homer in the Iliad's Catalogue of Ships in the same line with Plataea. It was celebrated in Greek mythology as the place where the Epigoni fought against the Thebans, and where the Argive chiefs were buried who fell in the battle. Pausanias, in his description of the road from Thebes to Chalcis, says that Glisas was situated beyond Teumessus, at the distance of seven stadia from the latter place; that above Glisas rose Mount Hypatus, from which flowed the torrent Thermodon. Strabo places it on Mt. Hypatus, and Herodotus describes the Thermodon as flowing between Glisas and Tanagra.

Glisas also figures in a tale in Greek mythology. Phocus of Glisas was father of a beautiful daughter Callirhoe. She was wooed by thirty suitors, but Phocus was hesitant to let his daughter marry one of them. At last he announced he would be consulting the Pythian Oracle before making a final decision; the suitors got outraged by that and killed Phocus. Callirhoe had to flee from the suitors; some peasants hid her away in the grain, and thus she escaped them. During the festival of Pamboeotia, she went to the shrine of Athena Itonia at Coroneia and revealed the crime of her suitors to the public; the people sympathized with her and declared a war on her father's murderers. Those sought refuge first in Orchomenus, and then in the town of Hippotae which lay between Thisbe and Coroneia. The inhabitants of Hippotae refused to deliver them up, so the Boeotian army under command of the Theban governor Phoedus captured the town, enslaved its citizens and stoned the suitors to death. The town was destroyed, and the land divided between Thisbe and Coroneia. The night before the capture of Hippotae, a voice coming from Mount Helicon had repeatedly been heard at the town; it would utter "I'm here", and the suitors recognized it as that of Phocus. On the day the suitors were executed, Phocus' tomb ran with saffron. Phoedus, on his way back home, received the news that a daughter was born to him, and decided to name her Nicostrate ("Victorious Army").

Its site is located near modern Ypato/Syrtzi.
