= Hippotae =

Polis in ancient Boeotia, Greece

Coordinates: 38°18′50″N 22°54′00″E

Hippotae or Hippotai (Ancient Greek: Ἱππόται) was a polis (city-state) in ancient Boeotia. It was independent at some point in the Archaic period. Situated in a plateau in the region of Mount Helicon in the southeast of Boeotia, it was between Thisbe and Coroneia, near modern Agia Anna in the plain of Kourkoura, which at approximately 45 square kilometres (17 sq mi) was sufficient to sustain a small polis. Later its territory was divided between Thisbe and Coroneia.

Hippotae also figures in a tale in Greek mythology. Phocus of Glisas, was father of a beautiful daughter Callirhoe. She was wooed by thirty suitors, but Phocus was hesitant to let his daughter marry one of them. At last he announced he would be consulting the Pythian Oracle before making a final decision; the suitors got outraged by that and killed Phocus. Callirhoe had to flee from the suitors; some peasants hid her away in the grain, and thus she escaped them. During the festival of Pamboeotia, she went to the shrine of Athena Itonia at Coroneia and revealed the crime of her suitors to the public; the people sympathized with her and declared a war on her father's murderers. Those sought refuge first in Orchomenus, and then at Hippotae. The inhabitants of Hippotae refused to deliver them up, so the Boeotian army under command of the Theban governor Phoedus captured the town, enslaved its citizens and stoned the suitors to death. The town was destroyed, and the land divided between Thisbe and Coroneia. The night before the capture of Hippotae, a voice coming from Mount Helicon had repeatedly been heard at the town; it would utter "I'm here", and the suitors recognized it as that of Phocus. On the day the suitors were executed, Phocus' tomb ran with saffron. Phoedus, on his way back home, received the news that a daughter was born to him, and decided to name her Nicostrate ("Victorious Army").
