= Itonia =

Epithet of the Greek goddess Athena

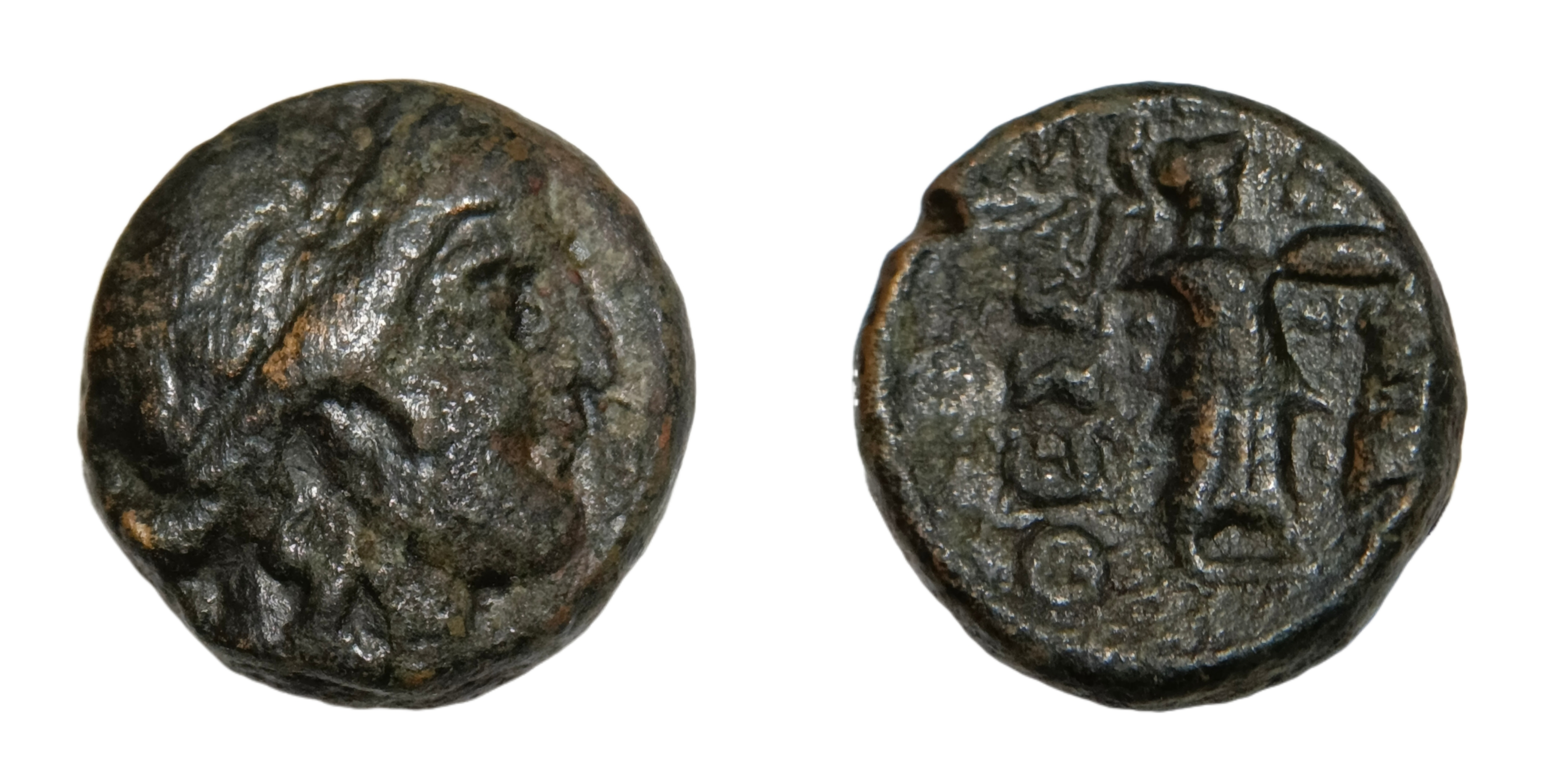
Ancient Greek coin with Athena Itonia on the reverse.

Itonia, Itonias or Itonis (Gr. Ἰτωνία, Ἰτωνίας or Ἰτωνίς) was an epithet of the Greek goddess Athena worshiped widely in Thessaly and elsewhere. The name was derived from the town of Iton in the south of Phthiotis.

The cult for Athena Itonia associated Athena in some mystical manner with the god of the lower world who is called Hades by Strabo, but in Pausanias, who must be speaking of the same cult, is called Zeus. It may be that Athena Itonia had something of the character which in her primitive worship she had at Athens, and that she was a goddess who fostered the growths of the earth and who therefore had some affinity to the Chthonic deities.

In Iton there was a celebrated sanctuary and festivals for this cult, and is hence also called incola Itoni ("resident of Iton"). From Iton her worship spread into Boeotia, where she was the chief deity of war, and the country about Lake Copais. In her temple between Pherae and Larissa were hung the shields won from the Gauls in the last victory of Greece over barbarism, although a fragment from Bacchylides indicates that Athena Itonia was not only a war goddess, but a goddess of the arts of peace, especially poetry.

The temple of Athena Itonia in Coronea was the meeting-place of the Panboeotian Confederacy, and where the Pamboeotia was celebrated, in the neighborhood of a grove of Athena. Other writers report the cult of Athena Itonia was also found at Athens and Amorgos, and a cult festival in Crannon.

According to another tradition, Athena received the epithet of Itonia from Itonus, a king or priest.
