= Sagmatas =

Mountain in Greece

Coordinates: 38°23′59″N 23°24′45″E

Mount Sagmatas (Greek: Σαγματάς, Ancient Greek: Ὕπατος, romanized: Hypatos, Latin: Hypatus) is a mountain of Boeotia, Greece. In antiquity, it was called Hypatos and hosted a temple of Zeus. It bounded the Theban plain on the east, towering over the town of Glisas, and the river Thermodon ran down it on course to Teumessus.
