= Priasus =

Two different Priasus in Greek mythology

In Greek mythology, Priasus (Ancient Greek: Πρίασος) may refer to two individuals:

- Priasus, one of the Argonauts and son of Caeneus. He was the brother of Phocus, another Argonaut.
- Priasus, commander of the Phrygians who fought in the war that Dionysus waged against the Indians.
