= Use of costume in Athenian tragedy =

Some authors have argued that costume use in Athenian tragedy was standardized for the genre. This is said to have consisted of a full-length or short tunic, a cloak and soft leather boots, and may have been derived from the robes of Dionysian priests or invented by Aeschylus. Brockett, however, disputes this, arguing that the evidence we have is based on archaeological remains, some few references in the texts, and the writings of later authors. As far as the vase paintings are concerned, most of these are dated later than the 5th century BCE and their relationship with theatrical practice is unclear. One of the earliest examples is a red-figure vase painting c. 500-490 BCE that shows a tragic chorus invoking a ghost, on a crater (bowl) in the Antikenmuseum in Basle.

The tragic actors were certainly heavily disguised. This had a religious purpose, for the actor was supposed to give up his identity in order to let another speak and act through him. Indeed, the dramas were performed in honour of Dionysus, the God of Ecstasy, which means “standing outside oneself”. Actors therefore had to renounce their individuality. The actors thought that the mask itself contained the character and are said to have prayed before putting on their masks. The costume was probably an elaborately decorated version of everyday clothing worn in the 5th century BCE. The garments included:

- chiton (robe or tunic)
- chlaina (overgarment)
- chlamys (short cloak)
- kothurnus (short lace-up boots)
- himation (overgarment)
- peplos (cloak).

The chiton worn by the actors differed from that worn in everyday life because it incorporated sleeves, which were coloured and patterned. The sleeves may in fact have been part of an undergarment. Long white sleeves were worn by the (male) actors for female roles, and indeed, in vase paintings females are usually painted with lighter skin.

The costumes worn for the performances of Alcestis, for example, were iconographic, and symbolised the opposition of light and dark. In the play, life is evoked as the act of seeing the sun. Death – the son of Night in Greek mythology - wears a black peplos and black wings. Apollo wears white, representing the sun. Admetus contrasts the black of the funeral procession with the white of the funeral procession. The corpse of Alcestis is dressed as a bride, in accordance with Greek tradition and Herakles wears a bearskin and carries a club.

The costumes worn gave the audience an immediate sense of character-type, gender, age, social status and class.

Around the time of Aeschylus, the boots or buskins worn by the actors were flat. The actors had the same “status” as the chorus. In the 3rd century BCE, the actors were raised to the status of heroes and “platform” soles began to be used, together with a head-dress called an onkos. The raised soles may have induced a stylised way of walking, suited to the rhythm of tragic verse, and the onkos made the actors taller, enhancing visibility. Their bodies were padded so that they did not look too slim. However, some authors believe that this happened later than the 3rd century BCE. It is also thought that the “teetering gait” is a misapprehension.

The masks were the most striking feature of the costume worn by the Athenian actors. Facial expression was lost anyway due to the huge size of the Greek theatres, but the masks were also a means of blotting out expression, so visual meaning was expressed by the entire body. The actors were seen as silhouettes, or integral bodies, rather than faces. The masks themselves were made of stiffened linen, thin clay, cork or wood, and covered the whole head and had hair.

Attempts have been made in modern times to investigate the use of masks in Athenian tragedy through practice research. These explorations conclude that masks may lead to a more demonstrative style of acting, with declamatory delivery of the lines substituted for intimacy. They also found that the mask could impede the projection of sound. The Greeks are said to have overcome this in various ways. Initially, the mouth apertures were small, but later this became a “wide-open” mouth. Some authors believe that the mouth was shaped like a “mouth-trumpet” and had an amplifying effect. Certainly, the use of a mask covering the whole produces an enhanced resonating effect, which serves dramatic delivery.

Performances therefore had to be more physical. Peter Arnott states that the Greeks thought good acting and a good voice were synonymous. This was achieved through athletic training, voice exercises and diet.

Experiments have shown that unaccustomed actors suffer disorientation and restriction when masked. The Greeks countered this through a vocabulary of gesture known as cheironomia (gesticulation). Aristotle says that in his day excessive gestures were used – leading to overacting – compared with the older tradition.

Masks can also be used as a dramatic tool, e.g. lowering the masks shows reflection, raising the mask shows a challenge or superiority. The Greeks called these physical stances schemata (forms).

Silent masks were used to great effect, particularly on child actors, expressing powerlessness, bewilderment, vulnerability, etc.

The use of masks enabled the three speaking actors to portray up to eight or nine characters, through multiple role-playing. The same character could therefore be played by different actors, and transitions within a character would be portrayed by the use of different masks.

The wide variety of masks used is attested by Pollux, a rhetorician writing in 2nd century CE, in his Onomastikon. He lists 30 different male masks (old age with white or grey hair, the tyrant with thick black hair, a fair, pale masks indicating sorrow or sickness, a boastful soldier, a rustic, servants, a cook, etc.) and 17 female masks (fat and thin old women, two matrons, one virgin, a bawd, a mistress, three courtesans, a lady's maid, etc.).

== Sources ==
- Taylor, David. The Greek and Roman Stage (Bristol Classical Press, 1999).
- Simon, Erika . The Ancient Theatre (Taylor & Francis, 1982).
- Webster, T.B.L. Greek Theatre Production (Methuen young books; 2nd ed., 1970)
- Brockett, Oscar. History of the Theatre (Pearson, 2008)
- Arnott, P. Introduction to the Greek Theatre (Papermac, 1971).
- McDonald, Marianne & Walton, J. Michael. The Cambridge Companion to Greek and Roman Theatre (Cambridge University Press, 2007).
- Rehm, Rush. Greek Tragic Theatre (Routledge, 1994).
- McLeish, Kenneth & Griffiths, Trevor R. A Guide to Greek Theatre and Drama (Methuen, 2003).
- Wiles, David. Tragedy in Athens(Cambridge University Press, 1999)
- Laver, James. Costume in the Theatre(Harrap, 1964)
