= Thermodon (Boeotia) =

Ancient torrent in Boeotia, Greece

The Thermodon (Ancient Greek: Θερμώδων) was a river of ancient Boeotia that rose in Mount Hypatus, and flowed past Teumessus, and emptied into the Asopus near Tanagra.
