= Teumessus =

Town in ancient Boeotia

Coordinates: 38°21′48″N 23°23′35″E

Teumessus or Teumessos (Ancient Greek: Τευμησσός) was a town in ancient Boeotia, situated in the plain of Thebes, upon a low rocky hill of the same name. The name of this hill appears to have been also given to the range of mountains separating the plain of Thebes from the valley of the Asopus. Teumessus was upon the road from Thebes to Chalcis, at the distance of 100 stadia from the former. It is mentioned in one of the Homeric hymns with the epithet λεχεποίη or grassy, an epithet justified by the rich plain which surrounds the town. Teumessus is celebrated in the epic legends, especially on account of the Teumessian fox, which ravaged the territory of Thebes. The only building at Teumessus mentioned by Pausanias was a temple of Athena Telchinia, without any statue. Pausanias also mentions that Zeus hid Europa in Teumessus. The torrent Thermodon ran down Mount Hypatus on its way to Teumessus.

Its site is located near modern Mesovouni.
