= Battle of Syme =

Naval battle during the Peloponnesian War (411 BC)

- Part of the Peloponnesian War
Date	411 BC
Location	Off Syme
Result	Spartan victory

Belligerents
Sparta	Athens

Commanders and leaders
Astyoches	Charminus

Strength
At least 27 ships	About 20 ships

Casualties and losses
3 ships	6 ships

The Battle of Syme was a naval battle in 411 BC between Sparta and Athens, during the Peloponnesian War. It took place near the island of Syme in the south-eastern Aegean Sea.

In 411, the Spartans made an alliance with Persia. The alliance was made by Therimenes, who handed the Spartan fleet over to Astyochus once the negotiations were complete; Therimenes later drowned at sea. Astyochus was instructed to sail to Cnidus to meet up with twenty-seven ships from Caunus, equipped for them by the Persians. Meanwhile, the Athenian fleet was stationed at Samos under the command of Charminus. Charminus knew the Spartans were coming, having been informed by the Melians, and prepared to meet Astyochus at Syme.

The fleets met during a storm, with poor visibility, and after many of the Spartan ships had become separated from the main fleet. With about twenty ships, Charminus battled with the Spartan left wing, the only portion visible to him, and sank three ships. However, the rest of the Spartan fleet then arrived and surrounded the Athenians. Charminus retreated to Halicarnassus after losing six ships. The rest of the Athenian fleet came out from Samos and sailed to Cnidus, but neither side was willing to fight another battle.
