= Modern understanding of Greek mythology =

The genesis of modern understanding of Greek mythology is regarded by some scholars as a double reaction at the end of the 18th century against "the traditional attitude of Christian animosity mixed with disdain, which had prevailed for centuries", in which the Christian reinterpretation of myth as a "lie" or fable had been retained. In Germany, by about 1795, there was a growing interest in Homer and Greek mythology. In Göttingen Johann Matthias Gesner began to revive Greek studies and a new humanistic spirit. His successor, Christian Gottlob Heyne, worked with Johann Joachim Winckelmann, and laid the foundations for mythological research both in Germany and elsewhere. Heyne approached the myth as a philologist and shaped the educated Germans' conception of antiquity for nearly half a century, during which ancient Greece exerted an intense influence on intellectual life in Germany.

== Comparative approaches ==
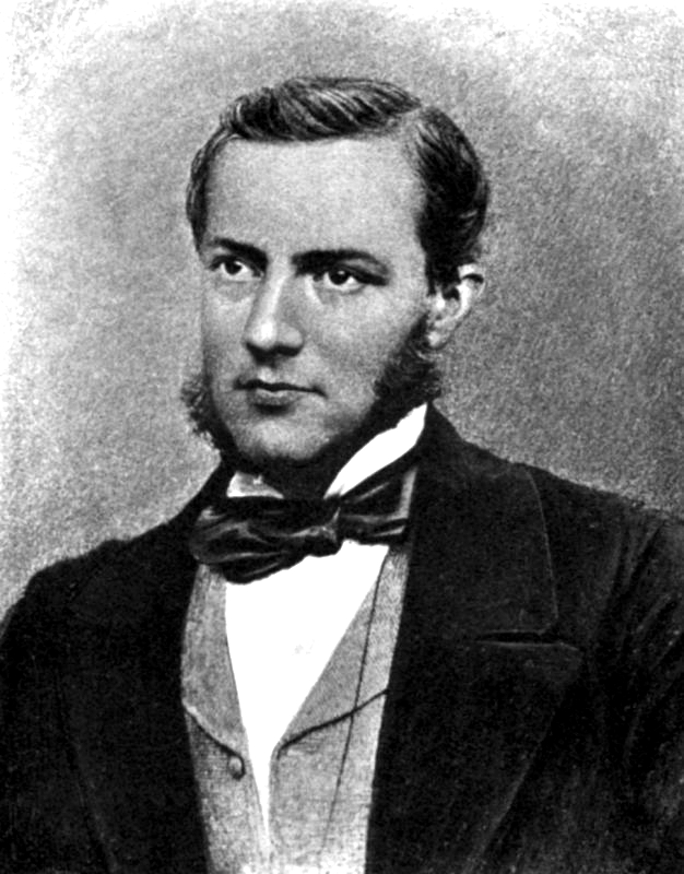
Max Müller is regarded as one of the founders of comparative mythology. In his Comparative Mythology (1867) Müller analysed the "disturbing" similarity between the mythologies of "savage" races with those of the early European races.

The development of comparative philology in the 19th century, together with ethnological discoveries in the 20th century, established the science of myth. Since the Romantics, all study of myth has been comparative. Wilhelm Mannhardt, Sir James Frazer, and Stith Thompson employed the comparative approach to collect and classify the themes of folklore and mythology. In 1871, Edward Burnett Tylor published his Primitive Culture, in which he applied the comparative method and tried to explain the origin and evolution of religion. Tylor's procedure of drawing together material culture, ritual and myth of widely separated cultures influenced both Carl Jung and Joseph Campbell. According to Robert Segal, however, Campbell’s "romantic view of myth is the opposite of a rationalist view, one epitomized by the Victorian anthropologists Edward Tylor and James Frazer". J.F. del Giorgio has added a new turn to the comparative approach, insisting in The Oldest Europeans about present Greek myths being generated by the clash between a Paleolithic European population and the incoming Indo-European tribes.

Max Müller applied the new science of comparative mythology to the study of myth, in which he detected the distorted remains of Aryan nature worship. Bronisław Malinowski emphasized the ways myth fulfills common social functions. Claude Lévi-Strauss and other structuralists have compared the formal relations and patterns in myths throughout the world. Evans himself, while studying the Minoan world, drew regularly on Egyptian and Near Eastern evidence for comparison, and the discovery of the Hittite and Ugaritic civilizations has uncovered texts as well as monuments which offer comparative material for ritual and mythology.

== Psychoanalytic interpretations ==
Sigmund Freud put forward the idea that symbolic communication does not depend on cultural history alone but also on the workings of the psyche. Thus, Freud introduced a transhistorical and biological conception of man and a view of myth as an expression of repressed ideas. Dream interpretation is the basis of Freudian myth interpretation and Freud's concept of dreamwork recognizes the importance of contextual relationships for the interpretation of any individual element in a dream. This suggestion would find an important point of rapprochement between the structuralist and psychoanalytic approaches to myth in Freud's thought.

Carl Jung extended the transhistorical, psychological approach with his theory of the "collective unconscious" and the archetypes (inherited "archaic" patterns), often encoded in myth, that arise out of it. According to Jung, "myth-forming structural elements must be present in the unconscious psyche". Comparing Jung's methodology with Campbell's theory, Segal concludes that "to interpret a myth Campbell simply identifies the archetypes in it. An interpretation of the Odyssey, for example, would show how Odysseus’s life conforms to a heroic pattern. Jung, by contrast, considers the identification of archetypes merely the first step in the interpretation of a myth". For Jung, myth is no more about gods than about the physical world; it is about the human mind and must be read symbolically. Karl Kerenyi, one of the founders of modern studies in Greek mythology, gave up his early views of myth, in order to apply Jung's theories of archetypes to Greek myth.

== Origin theories ==
The origins of Greek mythology are an open question. In antiquity, historians such as Herodotus theorized that the Greek gods had been stolen directly from the Egyptians. Later on, Christian writers tried to explain Hellenic paganism through degeneration of Biblical religion. According to the Scriptural theory, all mythological legends (including Greek mythology) are derived from the narratives of the Scriptures, though the real facts have been disguised and altered. Thus Deucalion is another name for Noah, Hercules for Samson, Arion for Jonah etc. According to the Historical Theory all the persons mentioned in mythology were once real human beings, and the legends relating to them are merely the additions of later times. Thus the story of Aeolus is supposed to have risen from the fact that Aeolus was the ruler of some islands in the Tyrrhenian Sea. The Allegorical theory supposes that all the ancient myths were allegorical and symbolical. According to the Physical theory the elements of air, fire, and water were originally the objects of religious adoration, and the principal deities were personifications of the powers of nature.

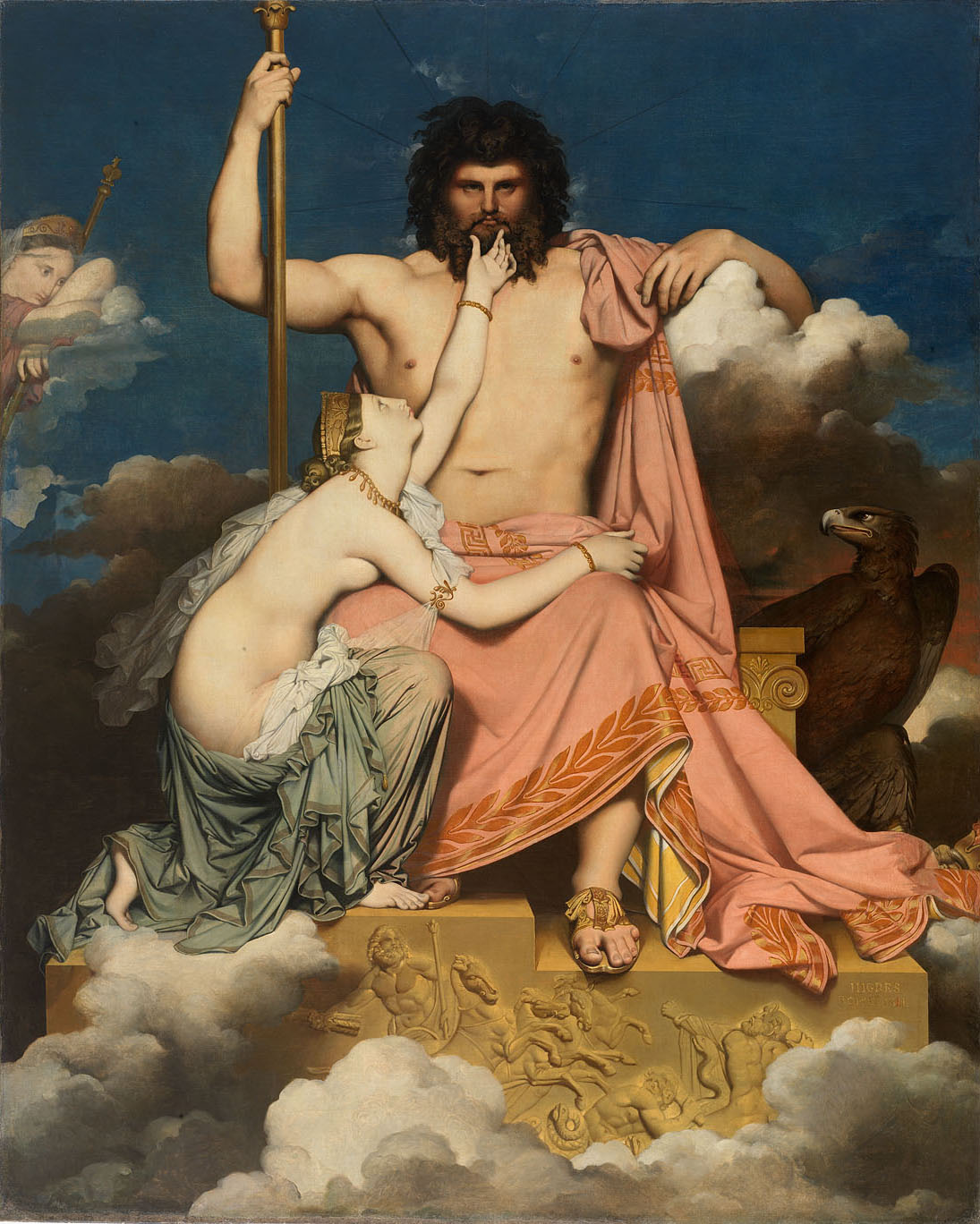
Jupiter et Thétis by Jean Auguste Dominique Ingres, 1811

The sciences of archaeology and linguistics have been applied to the origins of Greek mythology with some interesting results. Historical linguistics indicates that particular aspects of the Greek pantheon were inherited from Indo-European society (or perhaps both cultures borrowed from another earlier source), as were the roots of the Greek language. Prominent Sanskritist Max Müller attempted to understand an Indo-European religious form by tracing it back to its Aryan, Vedic, "original" manifestation. In 1891, he claimed that "the most important discovery which has been made during the nineteenth century with respect to the ancient history of mankind [...] was this sample equation: Sanskrit Dyaus-pitar = Greek Zeus = Latin Jupiter = Old Norse Tyr". Philologist Georges Dumezil draws a comparison between the Greek Uranus and the Sanskrit Varuna, although there is no hint that he believes them to be originally connected. In other cases, close parallels in character and function suggest a common heritage, yet lack of linguistic evidence makes it difficult to prove, as in the case of the Greek Moirai and the Norns of Norse mythology.

Archaeology and mythography, on the other hand, has revealed that the Greeks were inspired by some of the civilizations of Asia Minor and the Near East. Adonis seems to be the Greek counterpart—more clearly in cult than in myth—of a Near Eastern dying god. His name is related to the Semitic invocation "adon" (Lord) and appears in other cultures as Dumuzi, Tammuz or Attis. Cybele is rooted in Anatolian culture, and much of Aphrodite's iconography springs from the Semitic goddesses Inanna, Ishtar and Astarte. The theogonic myths current in the Near East in the second millennium BC, such as the myth of Anu, Kumarbi, and Teshub, contain significant stories of generational conflict. Meyer Reinhold argues that "such Near Eastern theogonic concepts, involving divine succession through violence and generational conflicts for power, found their way—the route is not certain—into Greek mythology. Our prime source is the great theogonic poem of Hesiod". Parallels between the earliest divine generations (Chaos and its children) and Tiamat in the Enuma Elish are also possible.

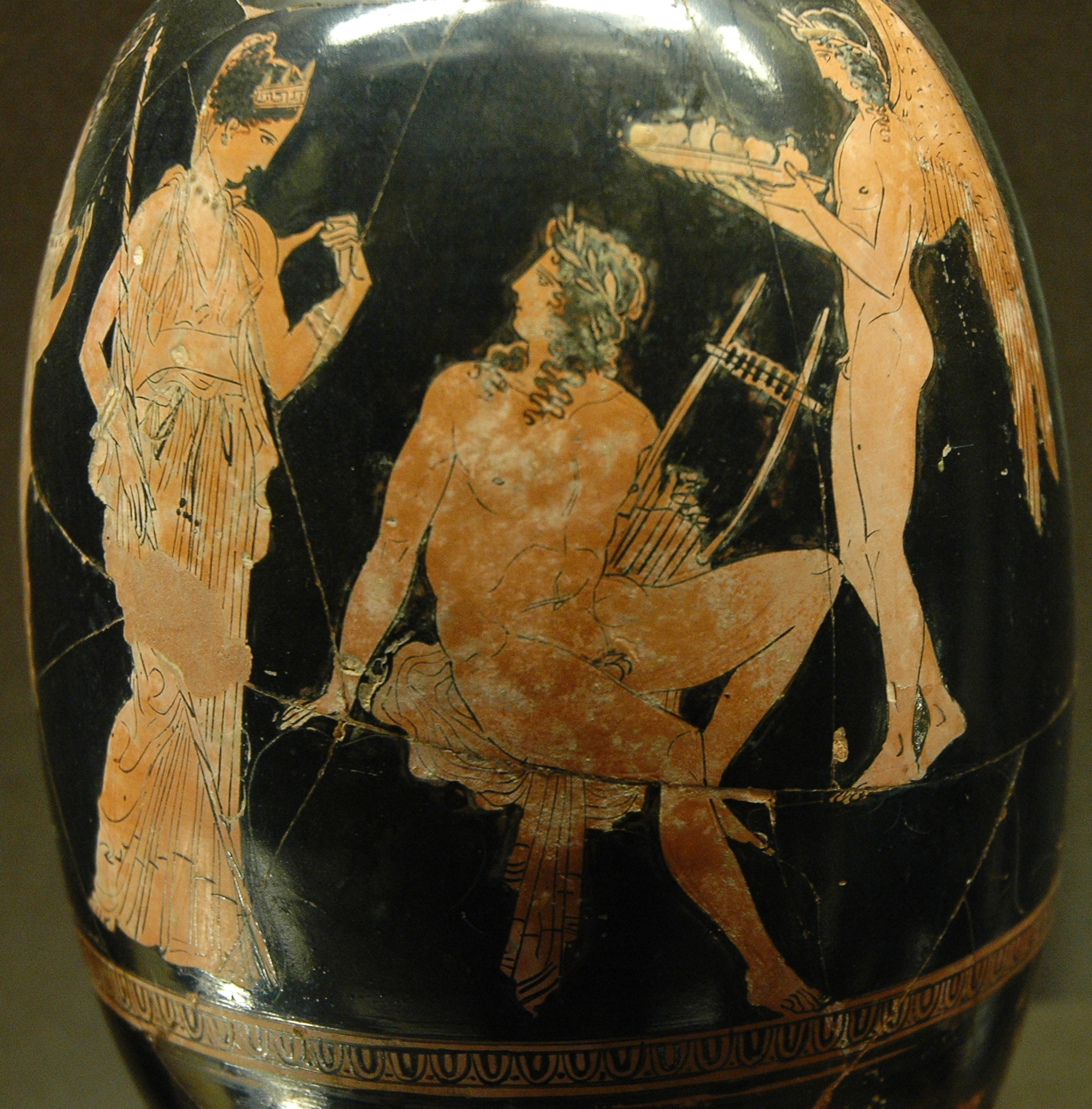
Aphrodite and Adonis, Attic red-figure aryballos-shaped lekythos by Aison (c. 410 BC, Louvre, Paris)

In addition to Indo-European and Near Eastern origins, some scholars have speculated on the debts of Greek mythology to the still poorly understood pre-Hellenic societies of Greece, such as the Minoans and so-called Pelasgians. This is especially true in the case of chthonic deities and mother goddesses. Historians of religion were fascinated by a number of apparently ancient configurations of myth connected with Crete: the god as bull—Zeus and Europa; Pasiphaë who yields to the bull and gives birth to the Minotaur; agrarian mysteries with a sacred marriage (Demeter's union with Iasion) etc. Crete, Mycenae, Pylos, Thebes and Orchomenus figure so large in later Greek mythology. For some, the three main generations of gods in Hesiod's Theogony (Uranus, Gaia, etc.; the Titans and then the Olympians) suggest a distant echo of a struggle between social groups, mirroring the three major high cultures of Greek civilization: Minoan, Mycenaean and Hellenic. Martin P. Nilsson, Professor of Classical Archaeology, worked on the structure, origins and relationships of the Indo-European languages, and concluded that all great classical Greek myths were tied to Mycenaen centres and were anchored in prehistoric times. Nevertheless, according to Walter Burkert, the iconography of the Cretan Palace Period has provided almost no confirmation of all these theories; nothing points to a bull, sexual symbols are absent and a single seal impression from Knossos showing a boy beneath a sheep is regarded as a scant evidence for the myth of Zeus' childhood.
