= Phocus =

Several figures in Greek mythology

Phocus (/ˈfoʊkəs/; Ancient Greek: Φῶκος means "seal") was the name of the eponymous hero of Phocis in Greek mythology. Ancient sources relate of more than one figure of this name, and of these at least two are explicitly said to have had Phocis named after them.

- Phocus, the son of Poseidon and Pronoe, possible eponym of Phocis according to a scholiast on the Iliad.
- Phocus, son of Aeacus and Psamathe, also possible eponym of Phocis according to a scholiast on the Iliad. Epeius, builder of the Trojan Horse, was a grandson of this Phocus.
- Phocus, son of Ornytion.
- Phocus, father of Callirhoe.
- Phocus, father of Manthea (seems to be a variation of the Callisto story) who consorted with Zeus (who was in the form of a bear) and became the mother of Arctus (seems to be variation of the character of Arcas) by the god according to clementine literature, Recognitions. The figure is mentioned by the literature to criticize the evils of polytheism in the views of Christianity, specifically focusing on adulteries of Zeus.
- Phocus and Priasus, two sons of Caeneus, were counted among the Argonauts.
- Phocus the builder, son of Danaus, is mentioned by Hyginus among the Achaeans against Troy, but is otherwise unknown.
