= Coroneia (Boeotia) =

City in ancient Boeotia

Coordinates: 38°23′33″N 22°57′25″E

Coroneia (Ancient Greek: Κορώνεια), or Coronea, was a town of ancient Boeotia, and a member of the Boeotian League. It is described by Strabo as situated upon a height near Mount Helicon; its territory was called Κορωνειακή. The town stood upon an insulated hill at the entrance of a valley leading southwards to Mt. Helicon, the principal summit of which is seen at the head of the valley. From this hill there was a fine view over the Lake Copais, and at its foot there was a broad plain extending as far as the marshes of the lake. On either side of the hill flowed two streams, one on the eastern or right hand side, called Coralius or Cuarius, and the other on the left, named Phalarus: a tributary of the latter was the Isomantus or Hoplias. Coroneia is said to have been founded by the Boeotians from Arne in Thessaly, after they had been driven out of their original homes by the Thessalians; and they appear to have called it Coroneia after the Thessalian town of this name. At the same time they built in the plain in front of the city a temple of Athena Itonica, also named after the one in Thessaly, and likewise gave to the river which flowed by the temple the name of Cuarius or Curalius, after the Thessalian river. In this temple was held the festival of the Pamboeotia, which was common to all the Boeotians. The Thessalian origin of Coroneia is also attested by Pausanias, who ascribes its foundation, as well as that of Haliartus, to Athamas and his descendants, who came from Thessaly.

Coroneia is mentioned by Homer in the Catalogue of Ships of the Iliad, in conjunction with Haliartus.

In historical times several important battles were fought in the plain in front of the town. It was here that in the Battle of Coronea (447 BC) the Athenians under Tolmides were defeated by the Boeotians in 447 BCE, in consequence of which defeat the Athenians lost the sovereignty which they had for some years exercised over Boeotia. The plain of Coroneia was also the scene of the Battle of Coronea (394 BC), which saw a victory gained by the Spartans and their allies under King Agesilaus II over the Thebans and their Argive allies in 394 BCE. In the Third Sacred War, Coroneia was twice taken by the Phocians under Onomarchus. Philip II of Macedon, after the conquest of the Phocians, gave up the town to the Thebans. Coroneia espoused the cause both of Philip V of Macedon and of Perseus of Macedon in their wars with the Romans.

Pausanias says that the most remarkable objects in Coroneia were altars of Hermes Epimelius and of the winds, and a little below them the temple of Hera. The principal remains of the ancient city are those of the theatre, of the temple of Hera, and of the agora. Coroneia minted its own coins, which are very rare, featuring the Boeotian shield on one side, and on the other a full-faced mask or Gorgonian head, with the epigraph graph KOPO.

Its site is located near modern Palaia Koroneia.
