= Pamboeotia =

Festive religious assembly in Ancient Greece

Pamboeotia (Ancient Greek: Παμβοιώτια) was a major festive panegyris of all the Boeotians, celebrated probably annually. The grammarians compare the Pamboeotia with the Panathenaea of the Atticans, and the Panionia of the Ionians. Though probably quite older than this, even primitive, the festival is celebrated with the name "Pamboeotia" only starting in the 3rd century BC. The festival was celebrated in the tenth month of the Boeotian calendar, Pamboiotos, at a temple of Athena Itonia in the neighborhood of Coronea.

The principal object of the meeting was the common worship of Athena Itonia. Activities included dancing and music and athletic events of a somewhat militaristic character, such as spear-throwing, trumpeting, heralding, mock battles, and horse racing. The priestess of the shrine was appointed by the Boeotian League.

A depiction of a Pamboeotia festival can be seen on a lekane in the British Museum, on which men approach an altar of Athena that is covered in flame. Some of the men are leading an ox to sacrifice to the goddess. Before these men is a woman bearing on her head a platter of offerings.

From Polybius it appears that during this national festival no war was allowed to be carried on, and that in case of a war a truce was always concluded. This panegyris is also mentioned by Plutarch. It is a disputed point whether the Pamboeotia had anything to do with the political constitution of Boeotia, or with the relation of its several towns to Thebes; but if so, it can have been only previous to the time when Thebes had obtained the undisputed supremacy in Boeotia. Some writers think it likely that this was the occasion on which Boeotian representatives to the Delphic Amphictyonic League were elected.
