= Parasopia =

Parasopia may refer to:

- Hypsopygia nostralis, a moth
- Parasopia (genus), a genus of moths in the subfamily Chrysauginae
- Parasopia (Boeotia), a region of ancient Boeotia, Greece

== See also ==
- Parasopias, a town of ancient Thessaly, Greece
