= Tanagra =

Tanagra Τανάγρα
- Municipality
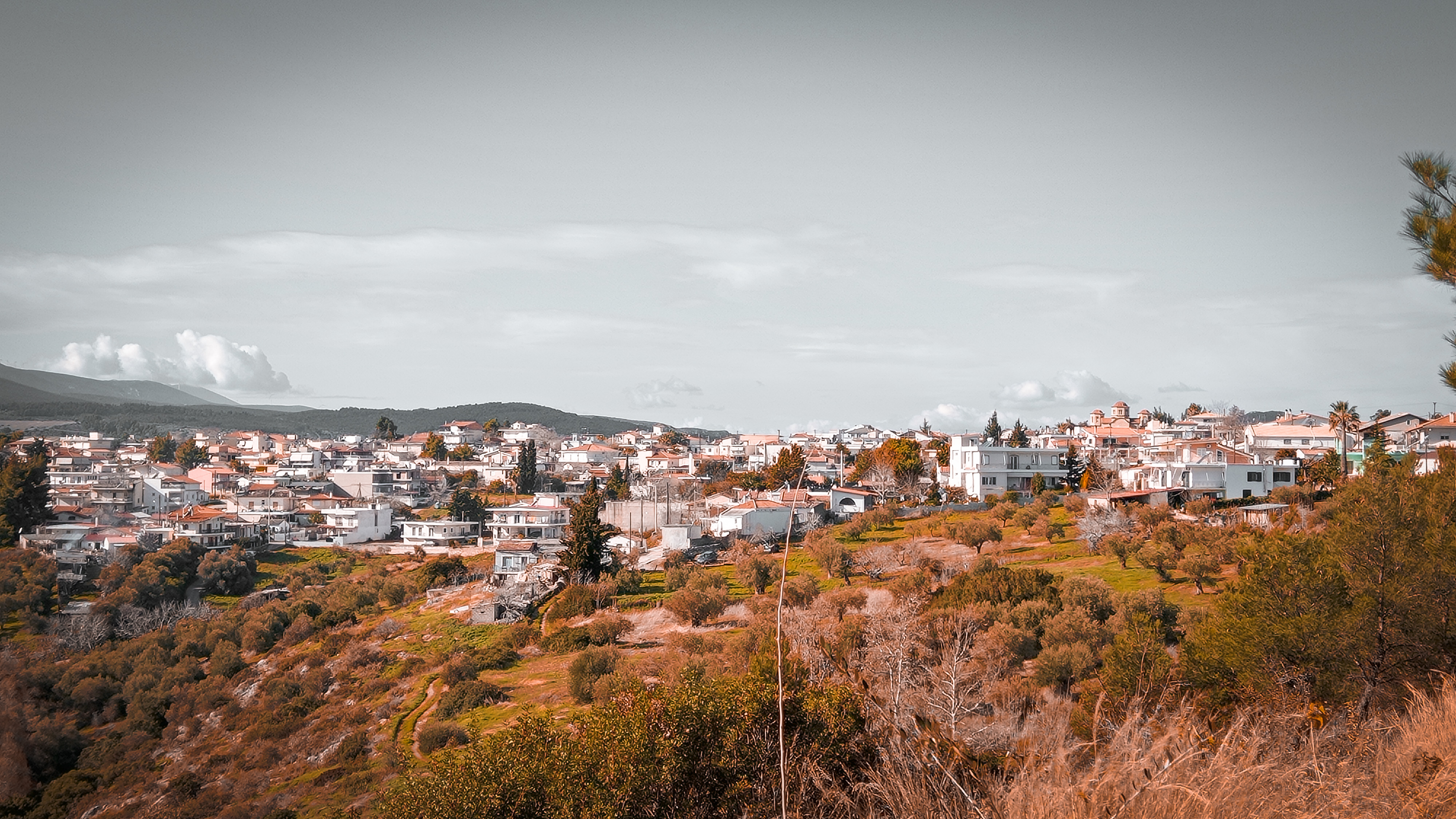

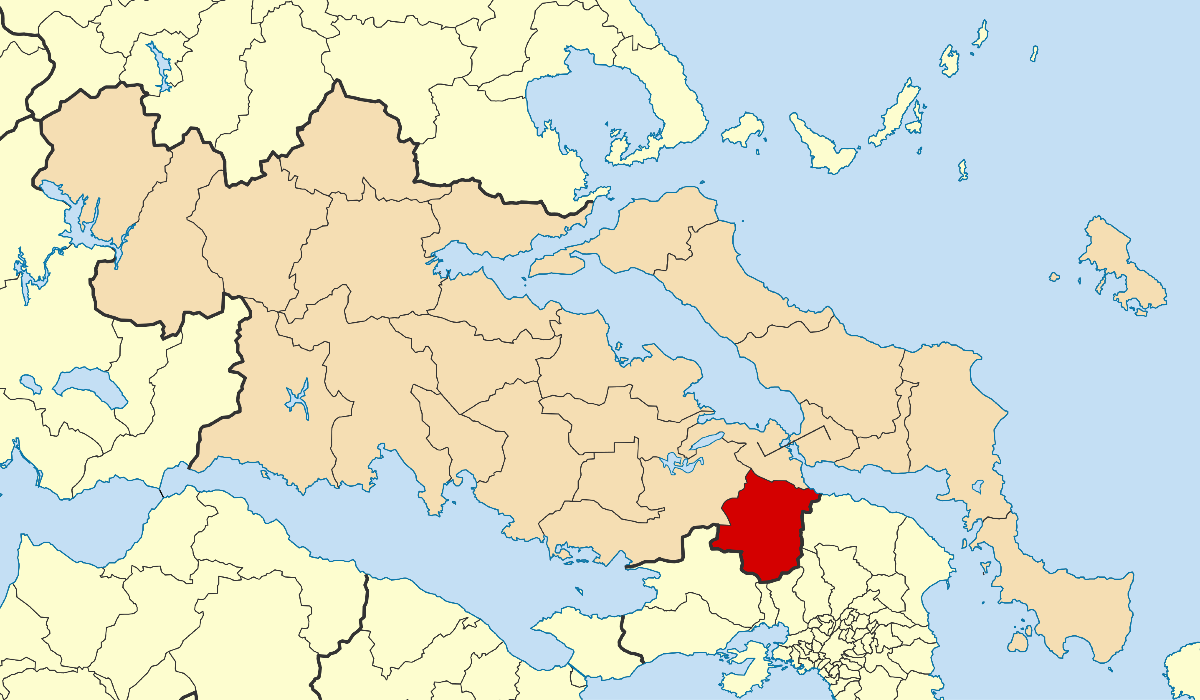

- Location within Greece
- Coordinates: 38.32781°N 23.53798°E
- Country: Greece
- Administrative region: Central Greece
- Regional unit: Boeotia

Area
  - Municipality: 461.02 km^{2} (178.00 sq mi)
  - Municipal unit: 122.53 km^{2} (47.31 sq mi)
  - Community: 27.814 km^{2} (10.739 sq mi)
- Elevation: 214 m (702 ft)

Population (2021)
  - Municipality: 18,500
  - Density: 40.1/km^{2} (104/sq mi)
  - Municipal unit: 3,212
  - Municipal unit density: 26.21/km^{2} (67.89/sq mi)
  - Community: 929
  - Community density: 33.4/km^{2} (86.5/sq mi)
- Time zone: UTC+2 (EET)
  - Summer (DST): UTC+3 (EEST)
- Postal code: 322 00, 320 09
- Area code: 22620
- Vehicle registration: ΒΙ

Tanagra (Greek: Τανάγρα) is a town and a municipality north of Athens in Boeotia, Greece. The seat of the municipality is the town Schimatari. It is not far from Thebes, and it was noted in antiquity for the figurines named after it. The Tanagra figurines were a mass-produced, mold-cast and fired type of Greek terracotta figurine produced from the later fourth century BC, primarily in Tanagra.

== Government ==
The municipality Tanagra was formed at the 2011 local government reform by the merger of the following 4 former municipalities, that became municipal units:

- Dervenochoria
- Dilesi
- Oinofyta
- Schimatari
- Tanagra

In 2014 the municipal unit Dilesi was created from parts of the municipal units Oinofyta (the village Dilesi) and Schimatari (the village Plaka Dilesi).

== History ==
=== Ancient ===
Tanagra (Ancient Greek: Τάναγρα), sometimes written Tanagraea, was a town of ancient Boeotia, situated upon the left bank of the Asopus, in a fertile plain, at the distance of 130 stadia from Oropus and 200 from Plataeae. Several ancient writers identified Tanagra with the Homeric Graea; but others supposed them to be distinct places, and Aristotle regarded Oropus as the ancient Graea. Pausanias mentions in Tanagra's location the ancient city of Graea, eponymous of the Graikoi, a Boeotian tribe whose name gave rise to the Latin Graecus "Greek" which later spread throughout the western world as the name of the Greeks and Greece. Homer, while reciting the Boeotian forces in the Iliad's Catalogue of Ships, provides the first known reference to the Boeotian city of Graea.

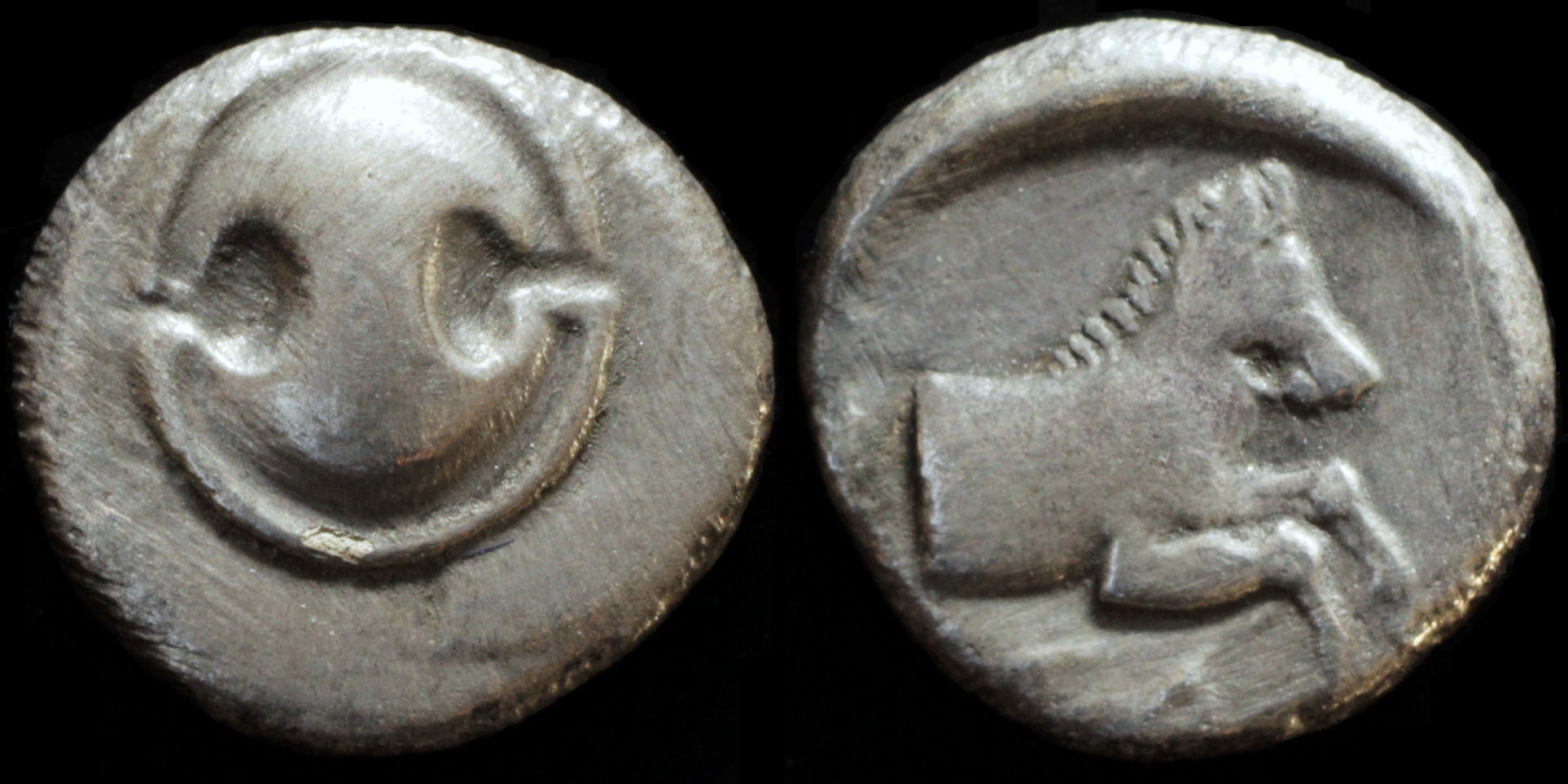
Silver obol struck in Tanagra 387–374 BC. A Beoetian shield is depicted on the obverse and forepart of a horse on the reverse

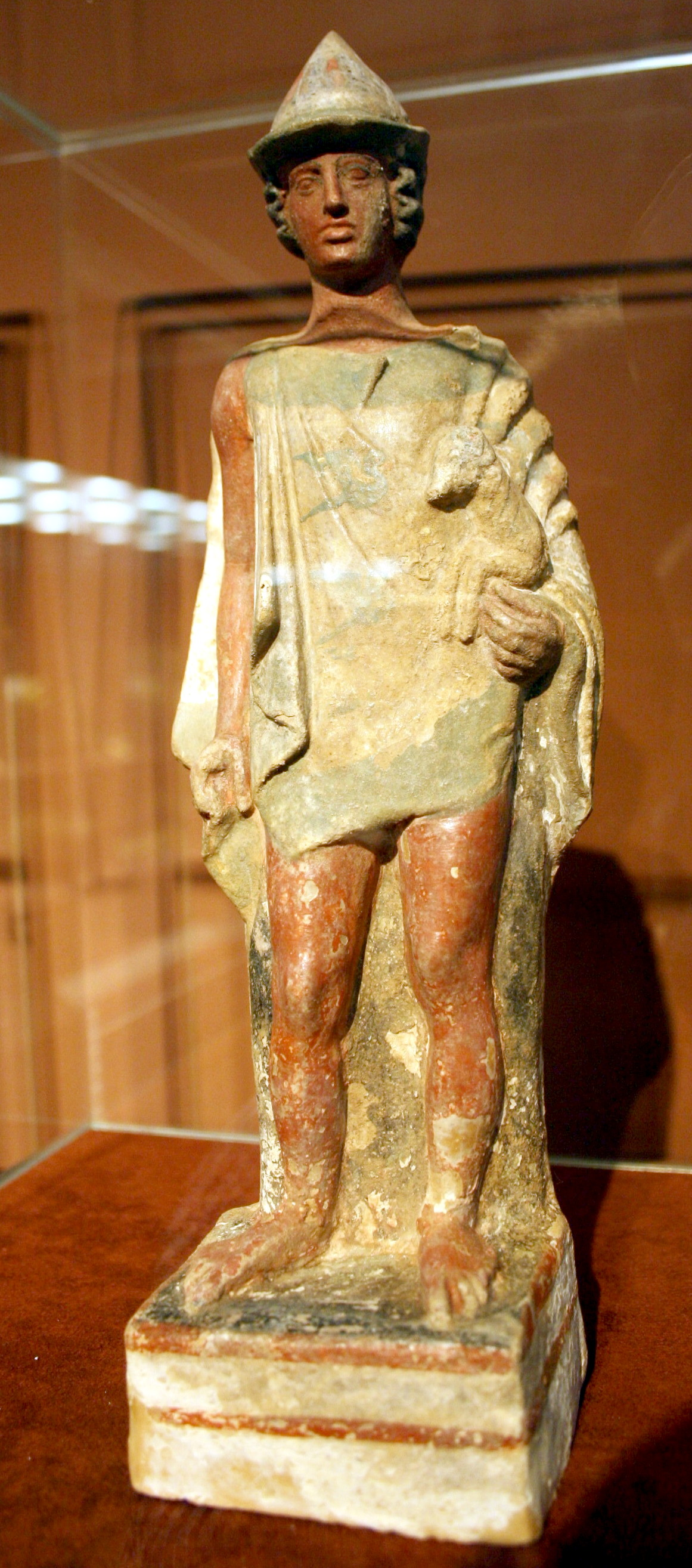
Ancient terracotta Tanagra figurine, National Archaeological Museum of Athens

Tanagra was also called Poemandria or Poimandria (Ποιμανδρία), and its territory Poemandris, from the fertile meadows which surrounded the city, or after its founder Poimandros, who took part in the Trojan campaign. The most ancient inhabitants of Tanagra are said to have been the Gephyraei, who came from Phoenicia with Cadmus, and from thence emigrated to Athens. From its vicinity to Attica the territory of Tanagra was the scene of more than one battle. In 457 BC the Lacedaemonians on their return from an expedition to Doris, took up a position at Tanagra, near the borders of Attica, with the view of assisting the oligarchical party at Athens to overthrow the democracy. The Athenians, with a thousand Argeians and some Thessalian horse, crossed Mount Parnes and advanced, against the Lacedaemonians. In the First Battle of Tanagra, both sides fought with great bravery; but the Lacedaemonians gained the victory, chiefly through the treacherous desertion of the Thessalians in the very heat of the engagement. At the beginning of the following year (456 BC), and only sixty-two days after their defeat at Tanagra, the Athenians under Myronides again invaded Boeotia, and gained at Oenophyta, in the territory of Tanagra, a brilliant and decisive victory over the Boeotian League, which made them masters of the whole country (see Battle of Oenophyta). The walls of Tanagra were now razed to the ground. The Second Battle of Tanagra was fought in 426 BC. the Athenians made an incursion into the territory of Tanagra, and on their return defeated the Tanagraeans and Boeotians.

Dicaearchus, who visited Tanagra in the time of Cassander, says that the city stood on a rugged and lofty height, and had a white chalky appearance. The houses are adorned with handsome porticoes and encaustic paintings. The surrounding country does not grow much corn, but produces the best wine in Boeotia. Dicaearchus adds that the inhabitants are wealthy but frugal, being for the most part landholders, not manufacturers; and he praises them for their justice, good faith, and hospitality. In the time of Augustus, Tanagra and Thespiae were the two most prosperous cities in Boeotia. Tanagra is called by Pliny the Elder a free state; it is mentioned by Ptolemy; and it continued to flourish in the sixth century.

Its public buildings are described at some length by Pausanias. The principal temple was that of Dionysus, which contained a celebrated statue of Parian marble, by Calamis, and a remarkable Triton. Near it were temples of Themis, Aphrodite and Apollo; and two of Hermes: in one of which he was worshipped as Kriophoros, ram-bearer, and in the other as the Promachos. Near the latter was the theatre, and probably at no great distance the gymnasium, which contained a picture of Corinna, who was a native of Tanagra. There was also a monument of this poet in a conspicuous part of the city. Pausanias remarks as a peculiarity in Tanagra, that all their sacred buildings were placed by themselves, apart from the houses of the town. He likewise notices that Tanagra was famous for its breed of fighting-cocks, a circumstance which is mentioned by other writers. Tanagra possessed a considerable territory; and Strabo mentions four villages belonging to it, Eleon or Heleon, Harma, Mycalessus, and Pharae.

The ruins of the ancient city are located at approximately: 38.306389°N 23.585833°E.

=== Modern ===
In the early 1870s, a spate of looting at Tanagra's necropolis saw the theft of artefacts, including figurines, from around 10,000 tombs. This episode raised the profile of the illegal excavation and export of antiquities among the Greek press and public, and led to the excavation of the site by Panagiotis Stamatakis between 1871 and 1873.

In the early 2000s, a military plane which was on a training flight crashed on the runway during bad weather. There were no survivors.

On Sunday 18 September 2005, the Archangelos air show, the largest ever organized in Greece, took place in Tanagra. It attracted a crowd of more than 200,000.

== Geography ==
The municipality has an area of 461.023 km^{2}, the municipal unit 122.527 km^{2}, the community 27.814 km^{2}. Tanagra is located SE of Thiva and Arma, SW of Schimatari and NW of Agios Thomas. Farmlands surround the rest of Tanagra, and the Asopus River along with the Parnitha mountains to the south.

=== Climate ===
Climate data for Tanagra (1957-2010) HNMS
Month	Jan	Feb	Mar	Apr	May	Jun	Jul	Aug	Sep	Oct	Nov	Dec	Year
Mean daily maximum °C (°F)	11.7 (53.1)	12.6 (54.7)	15.0 (59.0)	19.3 (66.7)	25.0 (77.0)	30.1 (86.2)	32.1 (89.8)	31.8 (89.2)	27.7 (81.9)	22.4 (72.3)	17.5 (63.5)	13.4 (56.1)	21.5 (70.8)
Daily mean °C (°F)	7.5 (45.5)	8.1 (46.6)	10.4 (50.7)	14.5 (58.1)	20.1 (68.2)	25.4 (77.7)	27.6 (81.7)	26.9 (80.4)	22.4 (72.3)	17.3 (63.1)	12.8 (55.0)	9.4 (48.9)	16.9 (62.4)
Mean daily minimum °C (°F)	3.4 (38.1)	3.4 (38.1)	4.8 (40.6)	7.5 (45.5)	11.6 (52.9)	16.1 (61.0)	18.6 (65.5)	18.6 (65.5)	15.3 (59.5)	11.8 (53.2)	8.2 (46.8)	5.2 (41.4)	10.4 (50.7)
Average precipitation mm (inches)	69.4 (2.73)	48.0 (1.89)	51.9 (2.04)	27.3 (1.07)	24.4 (0.96)	11.2 (0.44)	9.8 (0.39)	9.8 (0.39)	22.7 (0.89)	48.1 (1.89)	63.5 (2.50)	78.4 (3.09)	464.5 (18.28)
Average precipitation days	13.6	12.4	11.6	9.1	6.9	4.2	2.2	2.0	4.8	8.6	10.6	13.8	99.8
Average relative humidity (%)	77.1	73.9	71.5	65.7	57.7	48.0	46.4	49.0	58.6	68.5	75.7	77.7	64.2
Source: HNMS (1957-2010 averages)

== Demographics ==
Year	Community	Municipal unit	Municipality
1981	1,097	–	–
1991	847	–	–
2001	871	4,134	–
2011	1,117	3,827	19,432
2021	929	3,212	18,500

Arvanites settled in Tanagra in the Middle Ages, but today they only make up a linguistic minority.

== Economy ==
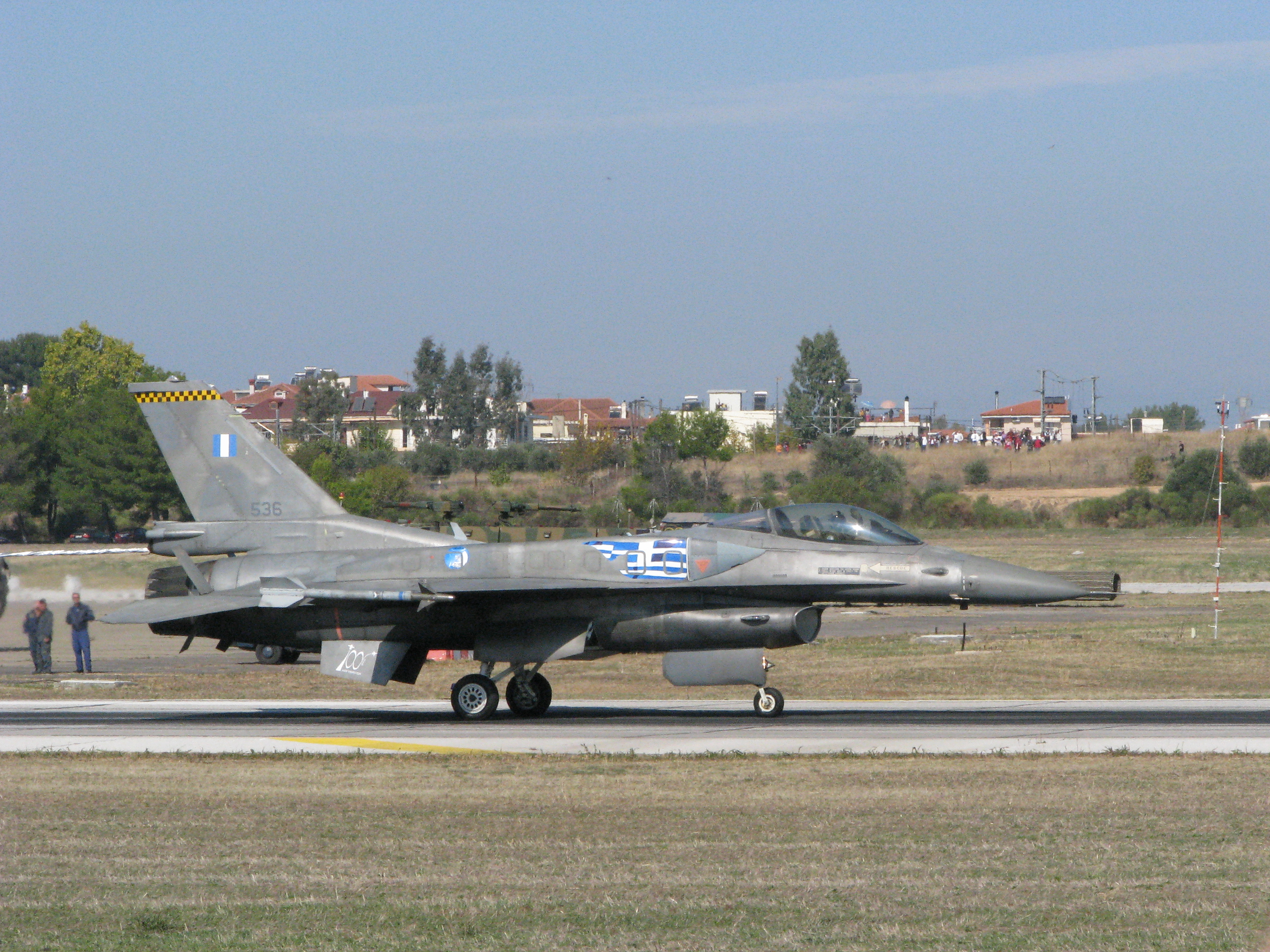
Greek F16 at Tanagra air base

Since 1956, the 114th Combat Wing of the Hellenic Air Force has been based in Tanagra Air Base. The base is one of Greece's largest military airports and its runway is about 3 km in length.

The Hellenic Aerospace Industry production and maintenance facilities have been located in the town since 1975.

== Transport ==
Tanagra can be accessed by the A1 motorway to the north, and by Boeotia Provincial Road 28 from Thebes to the west.

Tanagra is served by two interchanges, a partial southbound exit, a northbound entrance to the northwest and an almost-full to the east, serving access to the EO44 and EO77 national roads to the island of Euboea. Its service road lies to the south and is linked with the southeast bypass and to the military base.

== See also ==
- List of settlements in Boeotia
- Graia
- Graïke
- Cerycius

== Bibliography ==
- Galanakis, Yannis (2011). "An unpublished stirrup jar from Athens and the 1871–2 private excavations in the outer Kerameikos". Annual of the British School at Athens. 106: 167–200. doi:10.1017/S0068245411000074. JSTOR 41721707. S2CID 162544324.
- Marchand, Fabienne (2011). "A New Profession in a Funerary Inscription from Tanagra". Zeitschrift für Papyrologie und Epigraphik. 178: 207–209.
- "Population & housing census 2001 (incl. area and average elevation)" (PDF) (in Greek). National Statistical Service of Greece. 2001.
