= Kalamos, Attica =

Kalamos Κάλαμος
- Municipal unit
- Location within the regional unit

- Location within Greece
- Coordinates: 38°17′N 23°52′E
- Country: Greece
- Administrative region: Attica
- Regional unit: East Attica
- Municipality: Oropos

Area
  - Municipal unit: 44.878 km^{2} (17.327 sq mi)
- Elevation: 150 m (490 ft)

Population (2021)
  - Municipal unit: 4,941
  - Municipal unit density: 110.1/km^{2} (285.2/sq mi)
- Time zone: UTC+2 (EET)
  - Summer (DST): UTC+3 (EEST)
- Postal code: 190 17
- Area code: 22950
- Vehicle registration: Z

Kalamos (Greek: Κάλαμος) is a town and a former community in East Attica, Greece. Since the 2011 local government reform it is part of the municipality Oropos, of which it is a municipal unit. The municipal unit has an area of 44.878 km^{2}. Kalamos has historically been an Arvanite settlement.

== Geography ==
Kalamos is located 2 km from the South Euboean Gulf coast. The seaside village Agioi Apostoloi, 4 km to the east, is also part of the community of Kalamos. Kalamos is 4 km east of Markopoulo Oropou, 8 km north of Kapandriti and 36 km northeast of Athens city center.

=== Settlements ===
- Agioi Apostoloi (pop. 2,702 in 2021)
- Kalamos (pop. 2,239)

== Historical population ==
Year	Village population	Community population
1928	1,018	-
1940	1,295	-
1951	1,328	-
1961	1,192	-
1971	1,163	-
1981	2,806	-
1991	1,527	3,187
2001	1,967	5,468
2011	1,824	3,728
2021	2,239	4,941
