= Amphiareion of Oropos =

Ancient sanctuary of Amphiaraus in Attica, Greece

- Άμφιάρειο Ωρωπού (Greek)
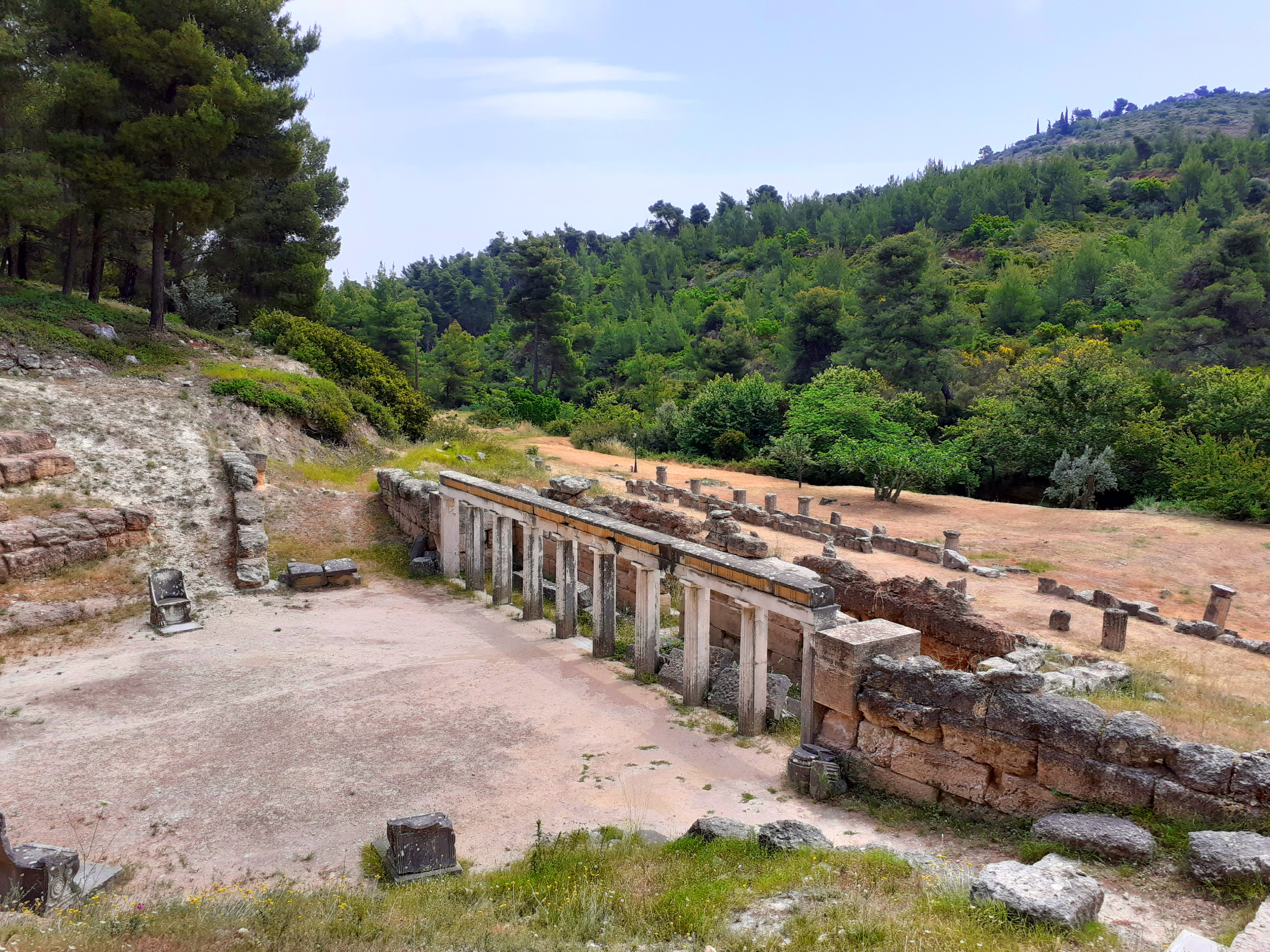
- View of the ancient theater.

- Location within Greece
- 38°17′29″N 23°50′44″E
- Type: Sanctuary
- Periods: Classical to Roman
- Satellite of: Athens
- Location: Markopoulo Oropou, Attica, Greece
- Region: Attica

History
- Built: 5th century BCE

Site notes
- Condition: Ruined
- Owner: Public
- Management: 2nd Ephorate of Prehistoric and Classical Antiquities
- Public access: Yes
- Website: Amphiareio, Oropos

The Amphiareion of Oropos (Greek: Άμφιάρειο Ωρωπού), situated in the hills 6 km southeast of the fortified port of Oropos, was a sanctuary dedicated in the late 5th century BCE to the hero Amphiaraos, where pilgrims went to seek oracular responses and healing. It became particularly successful during the 4th century BCE, to judge from the intensive building at the site. The hero Amphiaraos was a descendant of the seer Melampos and initially refused to participate in the attack on Thebes (detailed in the Seven Against Thebes of Aeschylus) because he could foresee that it would be a disaster. In some versions of the myth, the earth opens and swallows the chariot of Amphiaraos, transforming him into a chthonic hero. Today the site is found east of the modern town Markopoulo Oropou in the Oropos municipality of Attica, Greece.

The sanctuary is located 37.2 km NNE of Athens at a sacred spring; it contained a temple of Amphiaraos (with an acrolithic cult statue), as well as a theater, stoa, and associated structures. The temenos extended for some 240 metres northeast from the Temple of Amphiaraos (hence Amphiareion) along a streambed. The cult, which was both public and private, dates to the 5th century BCE. There was an upswing in the sanctuary's reputation as a healing site during the plague that hit Athens in the late 5th BCE. Herodotus relates that the oracular response of this shrine was one of only two correct answers to the test put to them all by the Lydian king Croesus. There were many dedications from Greeks, notable Romans, and others, many with inscriptions. On the southeast side of the streambed there are extensive remains of domestic structures as well as an unusually well-preserved clepsydra.

At the Amphiareion, in addition to the presumed annual festival, Greater Amphiareia were celebrated in an agonistic festival of athletic games, every fifth year. Two reliefs of the late 5th-early 4th century BCE seem to provide the earliest attestations of the festival games; there is an inscribed catalogue of victors at the Greater Amphiareia that dates before 338 BCE.

Amphiaraos was also worshipped at the site of Rhamnous about 17.5 km southeast, as well as at Athens, Argos, Sparta, and other sites. The cult at the Amphiareion came to an end with the outlawing of non-Christian worship in the Theodosian decrees at the end of the 4th century CE.

In 414 BCE, Aristophanes produced a comedy, Amphiaraos, of which fragments survive as quotations.

== Sanctuary of Amphiaraos ==
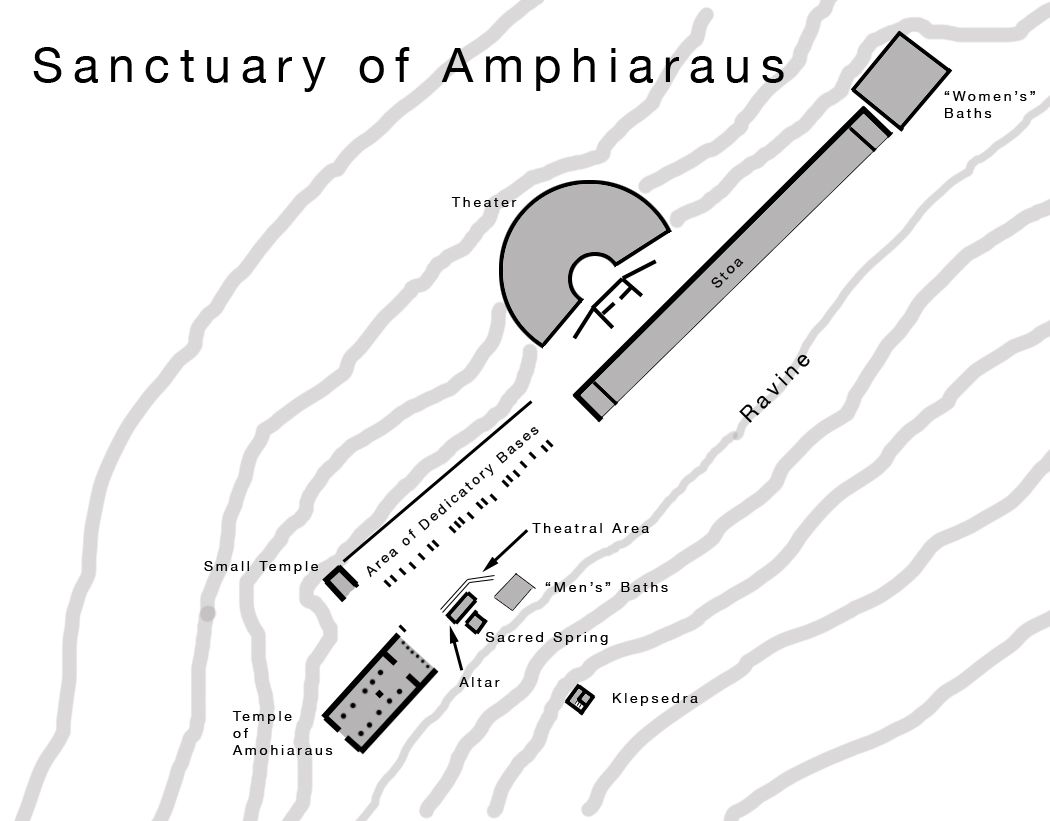
Plan of the Sanctuary of Amphiaraus.

At the Temple of Amphiaraos, the site is about 154 m in elevation, with a gentle slope to the northeast, as it fills the northwest bank of a small ravine between two hills. The sanctuary was located near the border of Attica and Boiotia, the respective spheres of control of Athens and Thebes; control over the site passed back and forth between the rival cities until Alexander the Great destroyed Thebes in 335 BCE. In the 2nd century CE, the Greek periegetic writer Pausanias stated:

I think that Amphiaraos most of all dedicated himself to interpreting dreams: it is clear that, when he was considered a god, he set up an oracle of dreams. And the first thing is to purify oneself, when someone comes to consult Amphiaraos, and the purification ritual is to sacrifice to the god, and people sacrifice to him and to all those whose names are on (the altar), and - when these things are finished – they sacrifice a ram and spread out its skin under themselves, lie down waiting for the revelation of a dream.
Description of Greece 1.34.5

An inscription from the site, however, states that each man may sacrifice what he wants. Some variation in practice during the nine centuries of cult activity at the sanctuary may be expected. The baths of the site were famous in antiquity. The locations of a stadion and a hippodrome are unknown.

=== Temple of Amphiaraos ===
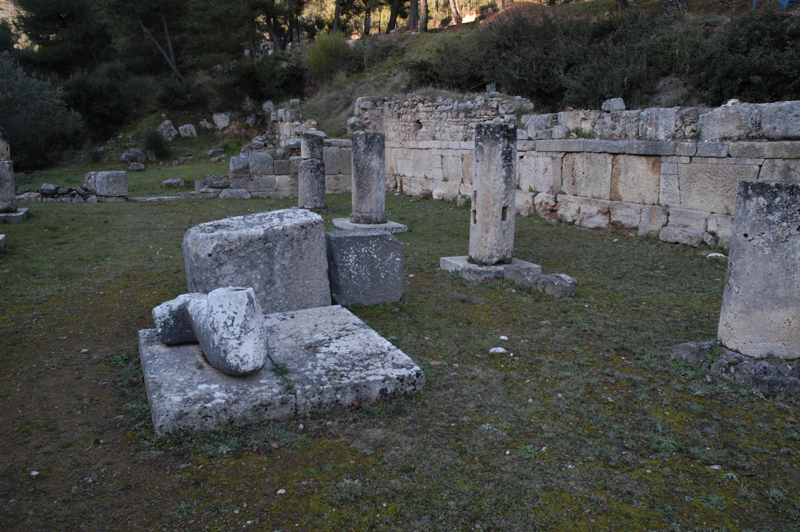
Interior view of the Temple of Amphiaraos showing interior colonnade and arm of an acrolithic statue

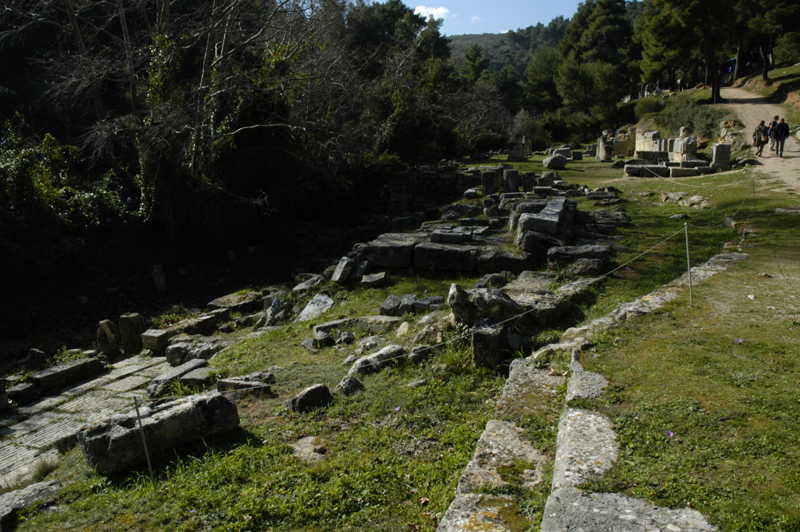
View SW across altar, theatral area, sacred spring, and temple

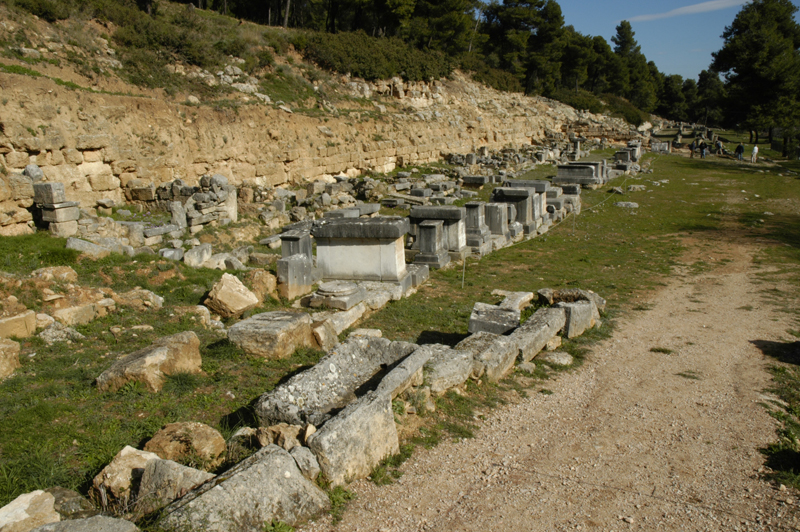
Line of dedication bases, looking NE

The early 4th-century BCE temple of Amphiaraos was of an unusual Doric hexastyle in antis plan: i.e. it had six columns across the front façade between small projecting walls. The antae were capped with half columns, giving the appearance of an octastyle façade. It measures 14 by 28 m (46 by 92 ft) Behind the columns was a pronaos, leading into a cella with two rows of five unfluted internal columns. Alongside the second pair of columns back from the pronaos there was a base for the acrolithic cult statue of Amphiaraos of which one arm remains in situ. In the rear wall of the cella, there was a threshold, perhaps a later addition.

On axis with the center line of the temple, and about 10.5 m (34 ft) northeast, are the remains of the altar divided into sections with inscriptions to a number of gods and heroes. Pausanias (1.34.3) says that the altar was dedicated to five groups:

- Heracles, Zeus and Apollo the Healer (Παιών)
- Heroes and heroes’ wives
- Hestia, Hermes, Amphiaraos, and of the children of Amphiaraos, Amphilochos
- Aphrodite, Panacea ("all-cure"), Iaso, Hygeia, and Athena the Healer (Παιωνία)
- Nymphs and Pan; the rivers Achelous and Cephisus

Wrapping around the altar on the west side is a stepped structure that may have served as an early theatral area before the construction of the theater. Immediately to the east is the sacred spring, where Pausanias says worshipers threw coins when they were healed of a disease. Immediately northeast of the spring is the structure traditionally called the men's bath.

To the northeast of the temple was a line of dedications of statuary, of which the bases (illustration, right) have largely survived; the avenue stretched for around 70 m (230 ft) along the road into the sanctuary. Among the more notable dedications, all of the Roman era:

- 42 BCE inscription honoring Marcus Junius Brutus as a Tyrannicide
- 86–81 BCE inscription for the Roman dictator Lucius Cornelius Sulla
- post-27 BCE inscription for Marcus Agrippa
- 1st BCE inscription for Appius Claudius Pulcher
- inscription for Gnaius Calpurnius Piso

There are also the remains of a small temple at the southwest extremity of this area.

=== Theatre ===
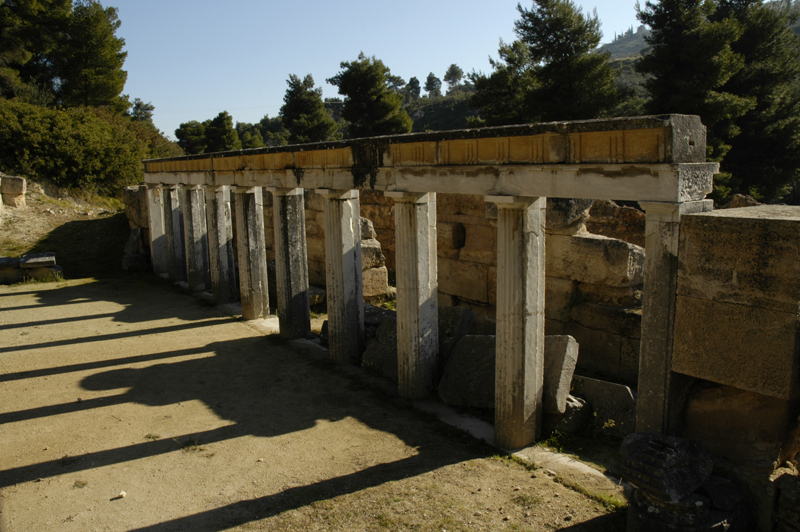
Proscaenium of the theater.

The theatre is dated to the 2nd century BCE by inscriptions and the seating area was likely composed of wooden seats on stone supports. Five marble prohedria (seat of honor at the front of the seating area) were discovered placed around the orchestra, which had a radius of 12.4 m. Two parodoi (side entryways) led off from the orchestra between the seating area of the cavea and the stage building. The Doric order proscaenium of the stage structure (c. 12 m wide) is well preserved and thus important for the study of theater design. The theater would have held approximately three hundred spectators.

=== Stoa ===
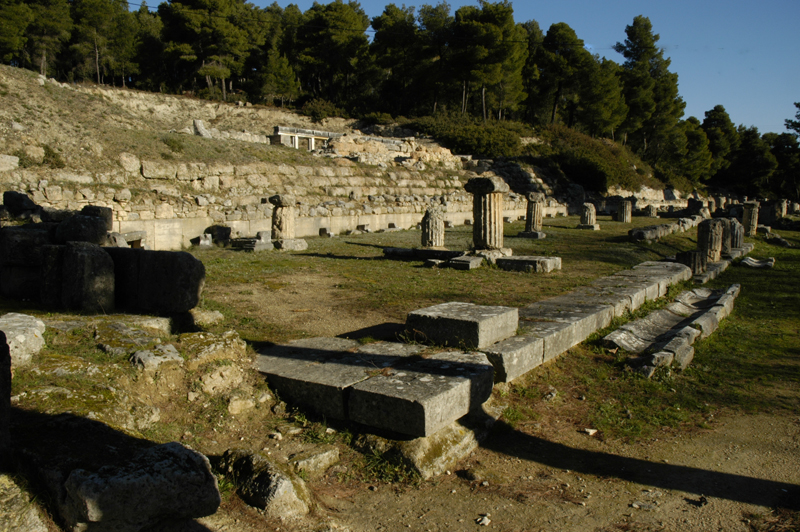
View of the Stoa looking NE.

Dating to the mid-4th century BCE, the stoa measured 11 by 110 m with 39 exterior Doric columns and 17 internal Ionic columns. There were stone benches set into the back walls of the structure, perhaps where the suppliants of the god slept and awaited their dreams. The sexes may have been segregated as may have been the case for the bath to the northeast of the stoa, which is traditionally called the women's bath.

=== Water clock ===
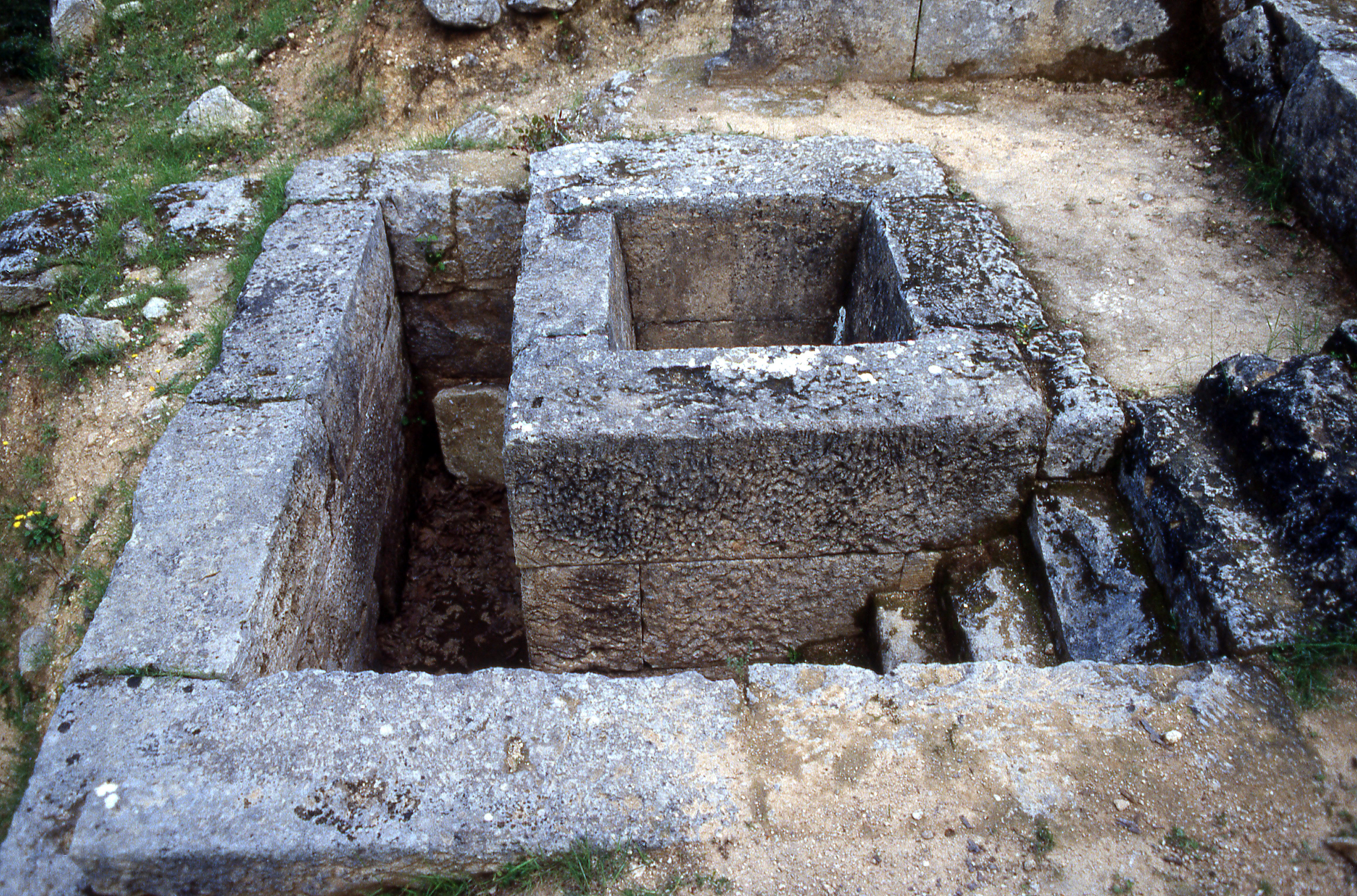
View of the klepsydra (water clock) from the southwest

On the southeast side of the streambed opposite the sacred spring are the remains of an unusually well-preserved klepsydra, or water clock, dating to the 4th century B.C. The structure consists of a square central reservoir nearly 2 m. in height, coated on the inside with a thin layer of waterproof cement. Outside, a flight of steps leads down to a narrow service area that allows access to the lower wall of the reservoir, where a small bronze outflow valve is inserted into a hemispherical depression just above the bottom of the tank on the northwest side. The water in the reservoir flowed out slowly through the narrow opening in the valve (c. 00.0026 m in diameter), and as the water level fell, the calibrated markings on a scale above the tank (no longer preserved) indicated the passing of the hours. In order to compensate for the decreasing rate of flow caused by the lessening of the water pressure as the tank emptied, the walls of the reservoir slope inward slightly toward the bottom, so that the speed with which the water level changed remained more or less stable even as the flow slowed. A very similar klepsydra, perhaps designed by the same man, was constructed on the south side of the agora in Athens at about the same date.

=== Inscription of Moschos ===
One of the findings at the Amphiareion is the Moschos inscription, documented as IJO I 18 or IG VII 452. The inscription, dating to approximately 300–250 BCE, is a manumission record detailing the freeing of a slave named Moschos, son of Moschion, who is identified in the Greek text as a "Jew" (Ioudaios). The inscription records that he was freed following a dream in which he was told by the gods Amphiaraus and Hygieia that he should be set free. Because he references pagan Greek deities and made his dedication following the practice of Incubation, he is considered the earliest evidence on the Greek mainland for a Hellenized Jew.

== Images of the Amphiareion ==
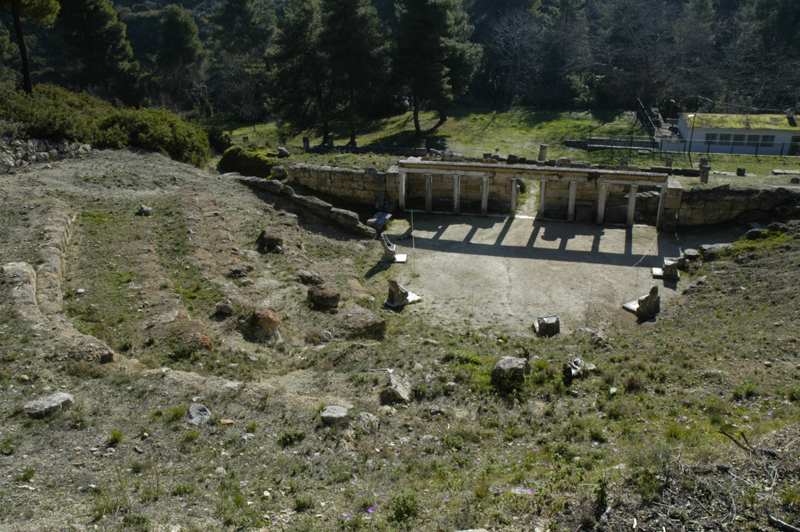
View SE from the top of the cavea of the theater

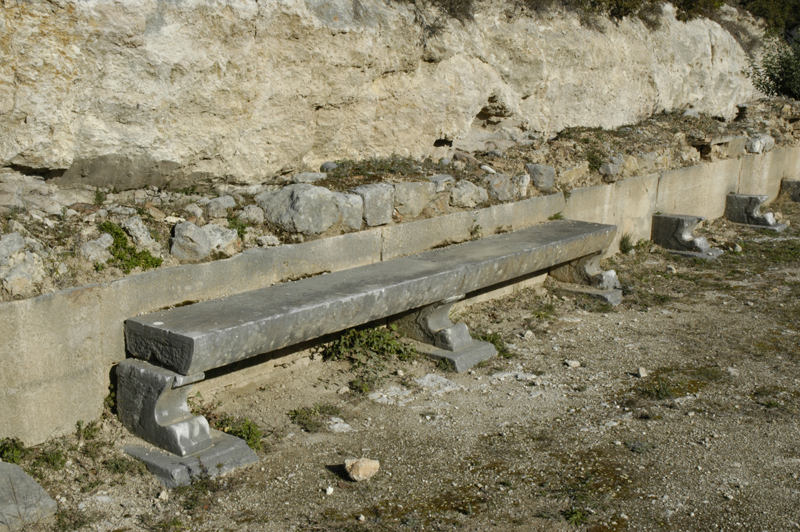
Bench along the rear wall of the stoa

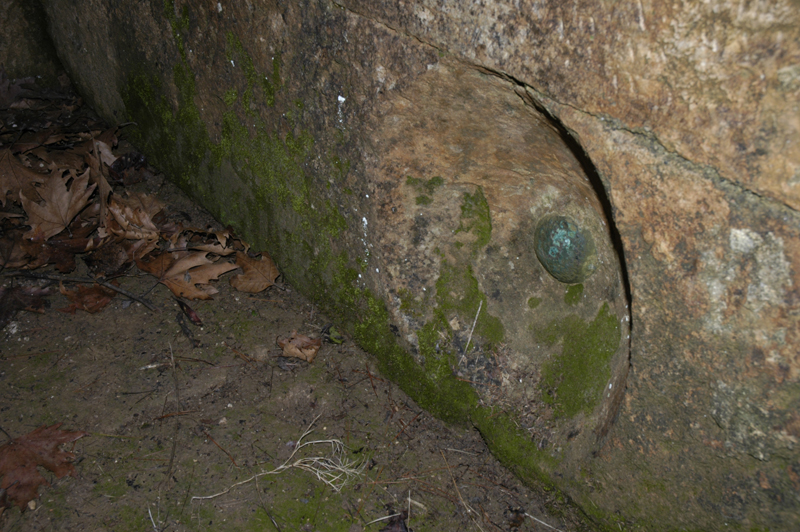
The bronze outflow valve at the bottom of the klepsydra reservoir

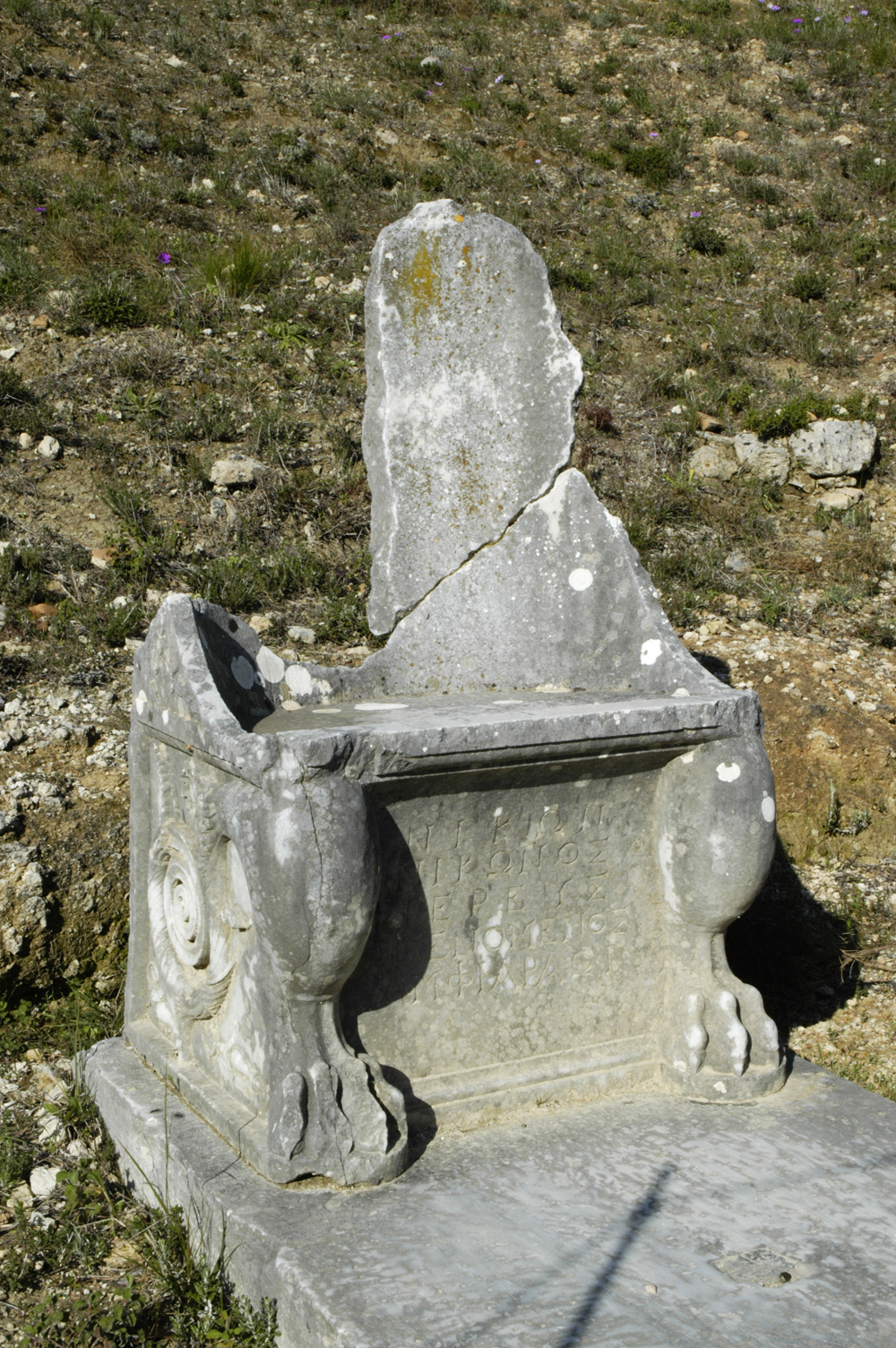
Marble prohedrion seat in the theater
