= Avlona railway station =

Αυλώνα Avlona
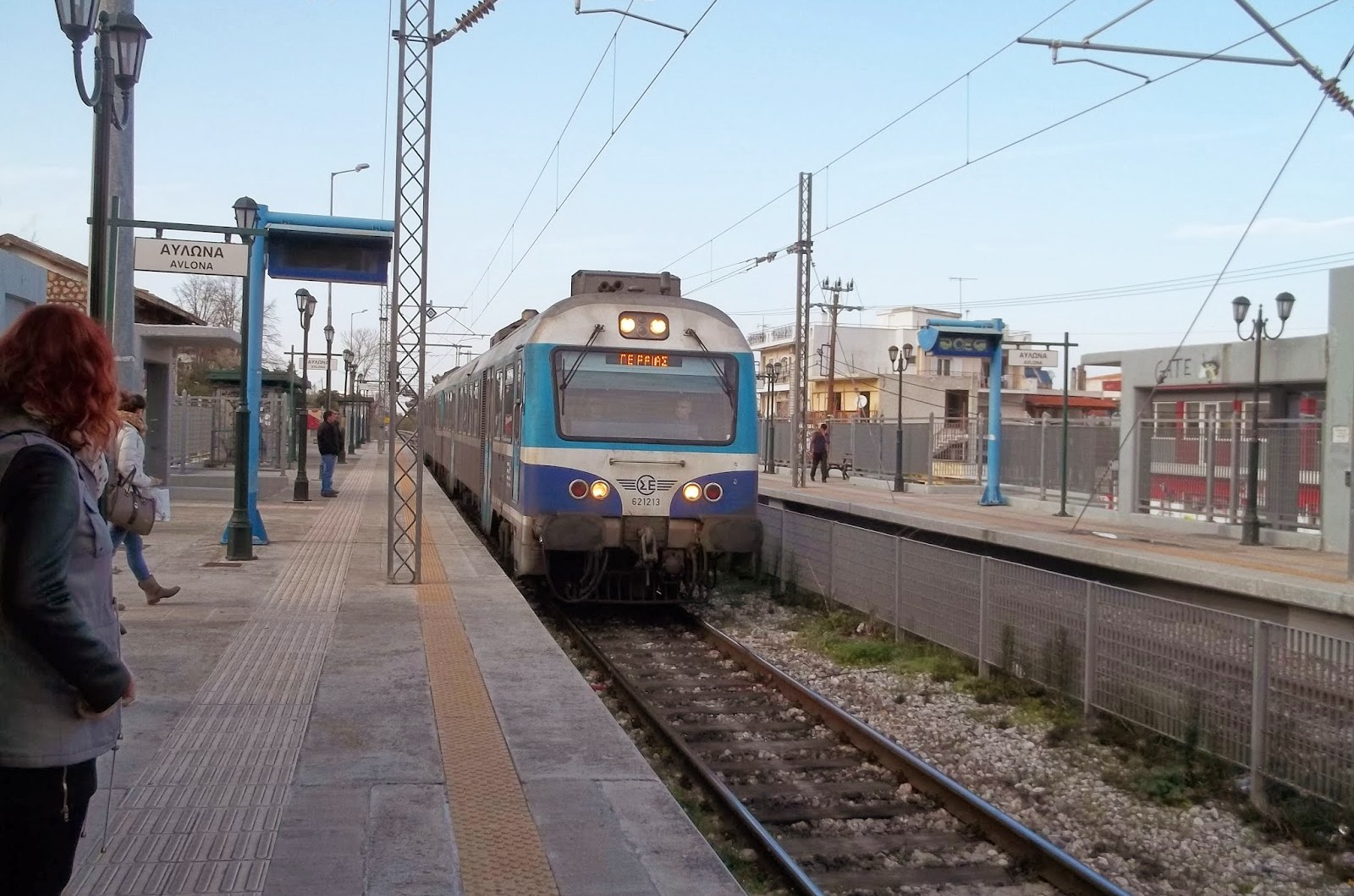
- Avlona railway station, October 2020

General information
- Location: Avlonas 190 11, Oropos; East Attica; Greece
- Coordinates: 38.2499°N 23.6956°E
- Owner: GAIAOSE
- Operator: Hellenic Train
- Line: Piraeus–Platy railway
- Platforms: 2
- Tracks: 2

Construction
- Structure type: at-grade
- Platform levels: 1
- Parking: No
- Cycle facilities: No
- Accessible: Yes

Other information
- Status: Unstaffed (as of 2021)
- Website: http://www.ose.gr/en/

History
- Former names: Kakosalesi

Key dates
- 8 March 1904: Opened
- 27 October 1983: Rebuilt
- 30 July 2017: Electrified

Services
Preceding station	Suburban Rail	Following station
Sfendali towards Athens	Line A3	Agios Thomas towards Chalcis
Location

Avlona railway station (Greek: Σιδηροδρομικός σταθμός Αυλώνας, romanized: Sidirodromikos Stathmos Avlonas) is a station on the Piraeus–Platy railway line in Avlona, a settlement north of Athens urban area, in the northern part of the Athens metropolitan area, in the municipality of Oropos, East Attica, Greece. It was inaugurated on 8 March 1904. It is owned by OSE, but services are provided by TrainOSE, through the Athens Suburban Railway from Athens to Chalcis. The station sits slightly above street level and can be accessed by either stairs or ramp.

== History ==
The Station opened on 8 March 1904, as Kakosalesi railway station (Greek: Σιδηροδρομικός σταθμός Κιούρκα, romanized: Sidirodromikós stathmós Kakosalesi), in what was then the Central Greece on what was a branch line of the Piraeus, Demerli & Frontiers Railway. The name reflected the older name for the area, the station's name was renamed to its current name on an unknown date. In 1920 the station and most of the standard gauge railways in Greece came under the control of the Hellenic State Railways (SEK). During the Axis occupation of Greece (1941–44), Athens was controlled by German military fourses, and the line used for the transport of troops and weapons. During the occupation (and especially during German withdrawal in 1944), the network was severely damaged by both the German army and Greek resistance groups. The track and rolling stock replacement took time following the civil war, with normal service levels resumed around 1948. In 1970 OSE became the legal successor to the SEK, taking over responsibilities for most of Greece's rail infrastructure. On 1 January 1971 the station, and most of the Greek rail infrastructure was transferred to the Hellenic Railways Organisation S.A., a state-owned corporation. In 1983 the station was rebuilt, reaping on 27 October of that year. The line was converted to diesel sometime before 1990. Freight traffic declined sharply when the state-imposed monopoly of OSE for the transport of agricultural products and fertilisers ended in the early 1990s. Many small stations of the network with little passenger traffic were closed down.

In 2001 the infrastructure element of OSE was created, known as GAIAOSE, it would henceforth be responsible for the maintenance, of stations, bridges and other elements of the network, as well as the leasing and the sale of railway assists. In 2003, OSE launched "Proastiakos SA", as a subsidiary to serve the operation of the suburban network in the urban complex of Athens during the 2004 Olympic Games. In 2005, TrainOSE was created as a brand within OSE to concentrate on rail services and passenger interface. In 2008, all Athens Suburban Railway services were transferred from OSE to TrainOSE.

The station was reopened on 6 May 2005. In 2009, with the Greek debt crisis unfolding OSE's Management was forced to reduce services across the network. Timetables were cutback and routes closed, as the government-run entity attempted to reduce overheads. In 2017 OSE's passenger transport sector was privatised as TrainOSE, currently, a wholly owned subsidiary of Ferrovie dello Stato Italiane infrastructure, including stations, remained under the control of OSE. That same year on 30 July Line 3 of the Athens Suburban Railway began serving the station.

The station is owned by GAIAOSE, which since 3 October 2001 owns most railway stations in Greece: the company was also in charge of rolling stock from December 2014 until October 2025, when Greek Railways (the owner of the Piraeus–Platy railway) took over that responsibility.

== Facilities ==
The ground-level station is assessed via stairs or a ramp. It has 2 side platforms, with the main station buildings located on the eastbound platform, however, due to state funding issues the booking office is closed, however, the waiting rooms are still open, with access to the platforms by stairs or lifts via a subway. The Station is housed in the original stone-built station (Now closed) There is no on-site Café. At platform level, there are sheltered seating and Dot-matrix display departure and arrival screens and timetable poster boards on both platforms. There is no car park or bus connections at the station.

== Services ==
Since 22 November 2025, the following weekday services call at this station:

- Athens Suburban Railway Line A3 between Athens and Chalcis, with up to one train every two hours, plus one extra train during the weekday afternoon peak.

L Ground/Concourse	Customer service	Tickets/Exits
Level; L1	Side platform, doors will open on the right
Level; L1	Platform 1	to Athens (Sfendali) ←
Level; L1	Platform 2	to Chalcis (Agios Thomas) →
Level; L1	Side platform, doors will open on the right

== See also ==
- Railway stations in Greece
- Hellenic Railways Organization
- Hellenic Train
- Proastiakos
- P.A.Th.E./P.
