= Therapnae =

Therapnae or Therapnai (Ancient Greek: Θεράπναι) was a town of ancient Boeotia, in the territory of Thebes, between that city and the Asopus. Its site is not located.
