= Graea =

Place in ancient Greece

Coordinates: 38°23′10″N 23°37′44″E

Map of ancient Boeotia, indicating the city Tanagra, which could be the place of Graia

Graea or Graia (Ancient Greek: Γραῖα, romanized: Graîa) was a city on the coast of Boeotia in ancient Greece. Its site is located near modern Dramesi in Paralia Avlidas.

== History ==
Graea is listed under Boeotia in Homer's Catalogue of Ships in the Iliad. It seems to have included the city of Oropus, though by the fifth century BCE it was probably a kome (district) of that city. According to Pausanias the name was a shortcut of the original name Tanagraia, who was daughter of the river-god Asopos. Graea was a greater area including Aulis, Mycalessus, Harma etc. It is also described by some sources as a city; Fossey argues for its identification with the hill of Dhrámesi 8 km from Tanagra, while others suggest it is identical with Oropus itself.

Graea was sometimes said to be the oldest city of Greece. Aristotle said that this city was created before the deluge. The same assertion about the origins of Graea is found in an ancient marble, the Parian Chronicle, discovered in 1687 and dated to 267–263 BCE, that is currently kept in Oxford and on Paros.

Reports about this ancient city can be also found in Homer, in Pausanias, in Thucydides, etc. The name Graïke (Ancient Greek: Γραϊκή [ɡra.ikɛ̌ː]) was used of the Oropus area, which was dependent on Athens during the Peloponnesian War, by Thucydides, and the term was also used by Stephanus of Byzantium. At some point, the whole of Oropus, including Graea, was incorporated into ancient Attica and became a deme of the phyle of Pandionis, as evidenced from a surviving inscription.

The word Γραικός (Graecus, Greek) may be interpreted as "inhabitant of Graia". Aristotle uses Graikoi as equivalent to Hellenes, and believes that it was the name originally used for the Dorians of Dodona in Epirus. The German historian Georg Busolt suggested that the name Graeci was given initially by the Romans to the colonists from Graia who helped the Euboeans to establish Cumae in southern Italy, and was then used for all Greeks. The classicist Robin Lane Fox states that Oropus was either located in or identical with the city of Graia, and writes:

If men from Oropos-Graia were among the early Greek visitors to Capua or Veii and even early Rome, we can better understand an age-old puzzle: why Greeks were called "Greeks" in the Latin West. Such people told their first contacts in the Latin region that they were "Graikoi," that is, people from Graia. They were thus called "Graeci" by the people whom they met.

Others state that the ethnonym may come from the adjective γραῖα graia "old woman", derived from the PIE root *ǵerh_{2}-/*ǵreh_{2}-, "to grow old" via Proto-Greek *gera-/grau-iu; the same root later gave γέρας geras (/ɡé.ras/), "gift of honour" in Mycenean Greek.

== See also ==
- Names of the Greeks
- Ogyges
- Minyans
