= Psaphis =

Deme of ancient Attica

Psaphis (Ancient Greek: Ψαφίς) was originally a town of the Oropia, but subsequently a deme of ancient Attica. It lay between Oropus and Brauron, and was the last demus in the north-eastern district of Attica.

The site of Psaphis is tentatively located at Revithia or Limnionas.
