= Ameinias of Thebes =

Ancient Greek epic and satirical poet

Ameinias of Thebes (also spelled Aminias; Ancient Greek: Αμεινίας ο Θηβαίος) was an ancient Greek epic and satirical poet who lived during the Hellenistic period. His satirical dramas were successfully performed in his time but were soon forgotten thereafter. These works secured victories and distinctions for their creator during various religious festivals in ancient Greece, such as the Charitesia in Orchomenus and the Amphiaraia in Oropos. Ameinias of Thebes, along with his contemporary creators Sophocles the Younger and Dorotheus of Tarentum, became known from an inscription of the 245th Olympiad (200 BC), which was discovered in Orchomenus.
