= Oropus =

Ancient Greek city in Boeotia

Coordinates: 38°19′10″N 23°47′24″E

Oropus or Oropos (Ancient Greek: ὁ Ὠρωπός, or rarely ἡ Ὠρωπός) was a town on the borders of ancient Attica and Boeotia, and the capital of a district, called after it Oropia (ἡ Ὠρωπία.) This district is a maritime plain, through which the Asopus flows into the sea, and extends for 5 miles (8.0 km) along the shore. It is separated from the inland plain of Tanagra by some hills, which are a continuation of the principal chain of the Diacrian mountains.

== History ==
Oropus was originally a town of Boeotia; and, from its position in the maritime plain of the Asopus, it naturally belonged to that country. It was, however, a frequent subject of dispute between the Athenians and Boeotians; and the former people obtained possession of it long before the Peloponnesian War. It continued in their hands till 412 BCE, when the Boeotians recovered possession of it. A few years afterwards (402 BCE) the Boeotians, in consequence of a sedition of the Oropians, removed the town 7 stadia from the sea. During the next 60 years the town was alternately in the hands of the Athenians and Boeotians, till at length Philip II of Macedon after the Battle of Chaeronea (338 BCE) gave it to the Athenians. In 318 BC the Oropians recovered their liberty. In 312 BCE Cassander obtained possession of the city; but Polemon, the general of Antigonus, soon afterwards expelled the Macedonian garrison, and handed over the city to the Boeotians. It has been concluded from a passage of Dicaearchus that Oropus continued to belong to Thebes in the next century; but the expression οἰκία Θηβῶν is corrupt, and no safe conclusion can therefore be drawn from the passage. Dicaearchus calls the inhabitants Athenian Boeotians, an epithet which he also applies to the inhabitants of Plataeae. Strabo also describes Oropus as a Boeotian town; but Livy, Pausanias, and Pliny the Elder place it in Attica. How long the Oropians inhabited the inland city is uncertain. Pausanias expressly says that Oropus was upon the sea; and the inhabitants had probably returned to their old town long before his time.

Although Oropus was so frequently in the hands of the Athenians, its name is never found among the Athenian demes. Its territory, however, if not the town itself, appears to have been made an Attic deme under the name of Graea (ἡ Γραῖα). In Homer Oropus does not occur, but Graea is mentioned among the Boeotian towns; and this ancient name appears to have been revived by the Athenians as the official title of Oropus. Aristotle said that Oropus was called Graea in his time; and accordingly we find in an inscription, belonging to this period, the people of Graea (Γραῆς or Γραεῖς) mentioned as a deme of the tribe Pandionis.

According to Dicaearchus, the Oropians were notorious for their grasping exactions, levied upon all imports into their country, and were for this reason satirised by Xenon, a comic poet: "All the tax collectors, all of them are abductors. (But) the bad taxes are levied by the Oropians.(Πάντες τελῶναι, πάντες εἰσὶν ἅρπαγες. Κακὸν τέλος γένοιτο τοῖς ᾿Ωρωπίοις)."

== Location ==
The position of Oropus is thus described by Strabo: "The beginning [of Boeotia] is Oropus, and the sacred harbour, which they call Delphinium, opposite to which is old Eretria in Euboea, distant 60 stadia. After Delphinium is Oropus at the distance of 20 stadia, opposite to which is the present Eretria, distant 40 stadia. Then comes Delium."

The modern village of Oropos stands at the distance of nearly two miles (3.2 km) from the sea, on the right bank of the Asopus: it contains some fragments of ancient buildings and sepulchral stones. There are also Hellenic remains at Skála (Σκάλα) or wharf upon the bay, from which persons usually embark for Euboea: this place is also called ἐς τοὺς ἁγίους ἀποστόλους, from a ruined church dedicated to the Holy Apostles. William Martin Leake originally placed Oropus at Oropos and Delphinium at Skála; but in the second edition of his Demi he leaves the position of Oropus doubtful. It seems, however, most probable that Oropus originally stood upon the coast, and was removed inland only for a short time. In the Peloponnesian War Thucydides speaks of sailing to and anchoring at Oropus; and Pausanias, as we have already seen, expressly states that Oropus was upon the coast. Hence there can be little doubt that Skála is the site of Oropus, and that Oropos is the inland site which the Oropians occupied only for a time. It is true that the distance of Oropos from the sea is more than double the 7 stadia assigned by Diodorus, but it is possible that he may have originally written 17 stadia. If Oropus stood at Skála, Delphinium must have been more to the eastward nearer the confines of Attica. Modern scholars accept the site of Skála, now called Skala Oropou after the ancient town.

== Sanctuary of Ampharaus ==
In the territory of Oropus was the celebrated temple of the hero Amphiaraus. According to Pausanias, it was 12 stadia distant from Oropus. Strabo places it in the district of Psophis, which stood between Rhamnus and Oropus, and which was subsequently an Attic deme. Livy calls it the temple of Amphilochus, who, we know from Pausanias, was worshipped conjointly with Amphiaraus. Livy further describes it as a place rendered agreeable by fountains and rivers. Dicaearchus describes the road from Athens to Oropus as leading through bay-trees (διὰ δαφνίδων) and the temple of Amphiaraus.

== See also ==
- List of ancient Greek cities

== Bibliography ==
- Agallopoulou, P. (1995). "Νέα Παλάτια, οδός 25ης Μαρτίου 6 (Ο.Τ. 12, οικόπεδο Φωστήρας Δημητρίου)". Archaiologikon Deltion. 50 (B1): 58–60.
- Agallopoulou, P. (1997). "Νέα Παλάτια, οδός 25ης Μαρτίου 3 (Ο.Τ. 13, οικόπεδο Φωστήρας Δημητρίου)". Archaiologikon Deltion. 52 (B1): 96-101.
- Kalliontzis, Ioannis (2021). "An Inventory List and a Votive Relief from the Sanctuary of Artemis Brauronia Found in Oropos". In Mackil, Emily Maureen; Papazarkadas, Nikolaos (eds.). Greek Epigraphy and Religion: Papers in Memory of Sara B. Aleshire from the Second North American Congress of Greek and Latin Epigraphy. Leiden ; Boston: Brill. pp. 108–42.
- Knoepfler, D. (2010). "L'occupation d'Oropos par Athènes au IVe siècle avant J.-C.: une clérouquie dissimulée". Annuario della Scuola archeologica di Atene e delle missioni italiane in Oriente. 88: 439–457.
- Petrakos, Vasilios Ch.; Heil, Matthäus (2023). Inscriptiones Graecae. Voluminis 7 Pars 2 Fasciculus 1: Megaridis, Oropiae, Boeotiae Oropus et Ager Oropius Decreta, tituli sacri, catalogi, dedicationes, tituli artificum, tituli honorarii / edidit Basileios Ch. Petrakos, adiuvante Matthaeus Heil (Editio Altera ed.). Berlin: de Gruyter. ISBN 9783110798814.
