= Delphinium (Boeotia) =

Town in Ancient Greece

Coordinates: 38°18′31″N 23°51′04″E

Delphinium or Delphinion (Ancient Greek: Δελφίνιον) was a town of ancient Boeotia or of ancient Attica, the port-town of Oropus. Strabo, calls the harbour "sacred" and says it was opposite ancient Eretria in Euboea at a distance of 60 stadia; he places it at the beginning of Boeotia, 20 stadia from Oropus. Thucydides writes that during the last part of the Peloponnesian War, the port was fortified by the Athenians.

Its site is located near modern Kamaraki.
