= Nea Palatia =

Nea Palatia Νέα Παλάτια
- Community
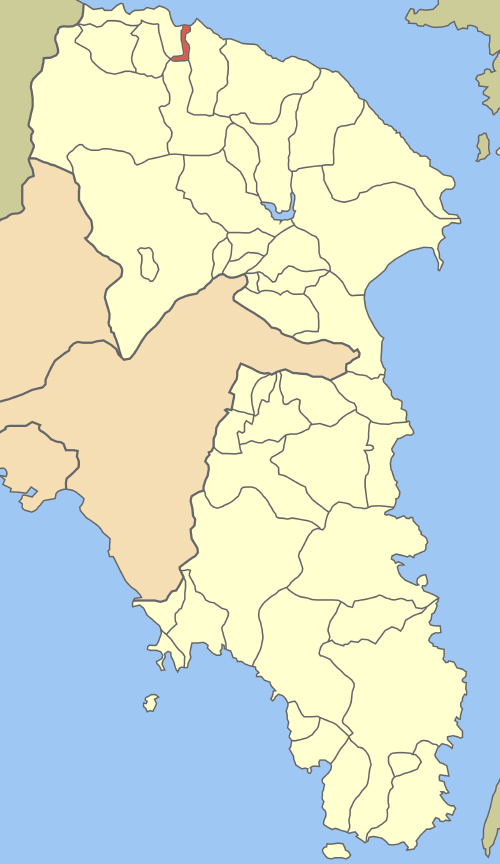
- Location within the regional unit

- Location within Greece
- Coordinates: 38°19′N 23°47′E
- Country: Greece
- Administrative region: Attica
- Regional unit: East Attica
- Municipality: Oropos
- Municipal unit: Oropioi

Area
  - Community: 8.525 km^{2} (3.292 sq mi)
- Elevation: 9 m (30 ft)

Population (2021)
  - Community: 3,656
  - Density: 428.9/km^{2} (1,111/sq mi)
- Time zone: UTC+2 (EET)
  - Summer (DST): UTC+3 (EEST)
- Postal code: 190 15
- Area code: 22950
- Vehicle registration: ZB-ZY

Nea Palatia (Greek: Νέα Παλάτια literally "New Palaces") is a community in East Attica, Greece. Since the 2011 local government reform it is part of the municipality Oropos, of which it is a community. It is part of Athens metropolitan area.

== Geography ==
Nea Palatia is a seaside town, situated on the south coast of the South Euboean Gulf. The town Skala Oropou is directly adjacent to its west. It is 8 km south of Eretria (on the island Euboea). The Greek National Road 79 connects it with the A1 motorway (Athens–Thessaloniki–Evzonoi) near Malakasa.

=== Subdivisions ===
- Agia Aikaterini (pop. 43 in 2021)
- Agia Triada (pop. 34)
- Agios Athanasios (pop. 65)
- Agios Konstantinos (pop. 359)
- Nea Palatia (pop. 3,018)
- Pontioi (pop. 137)

== Historical population ==
Year	Village population	Community population
1981	1,894	-
1991	2,472	3,078
2001	2,423	3,647
2011	2,723	3,573
2021	3,018	3,656
