= Oropioi =

Oropioi Δήμος Ωρωπίων
- Municipal unit
- Location within Greece
- Coordinates: 38°18′N 23°45′E
- Country: Greece
- Administrative region: Attica
- Regional unit: East Attica
- Municipality: Oropos

Area
  - Municipal unit: 32.89 km^{2} (12.70 sq mi)

Population (2021)
  - Municipal unit: 9,296
  - Municipal unit density: 282.6/km^{2} (732.0/sq mi)
- Time zone: UTC+2 (EET)
  - Summer (DST): UTC+3 (EEST)

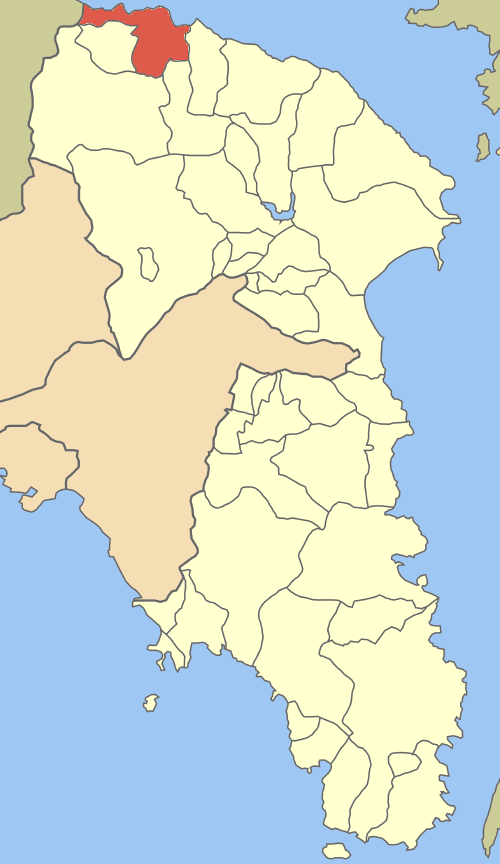

Oropioi (Greek: Δήμος Ωρωπίων) is a former municipality in East Attica, Greece. Population 9,296 (2021). The seat of the municipality was in the town Skala Oropou. Since the 2011 local government reform it is part of the municipality Oropos, of which it is a municipal unit. The municipal unit has an area of 32.890 km^{2}. The municipality Oropioi consisted of the municipal districts (now communities) Oropos, Nea Palatia and Skala Oropou. In 2014 the new community Chalkoutsi was created from part of Skala Oropou.
