= Skala Oropou =

Skala Oropou Σκάλα Ωρωπού
- Community
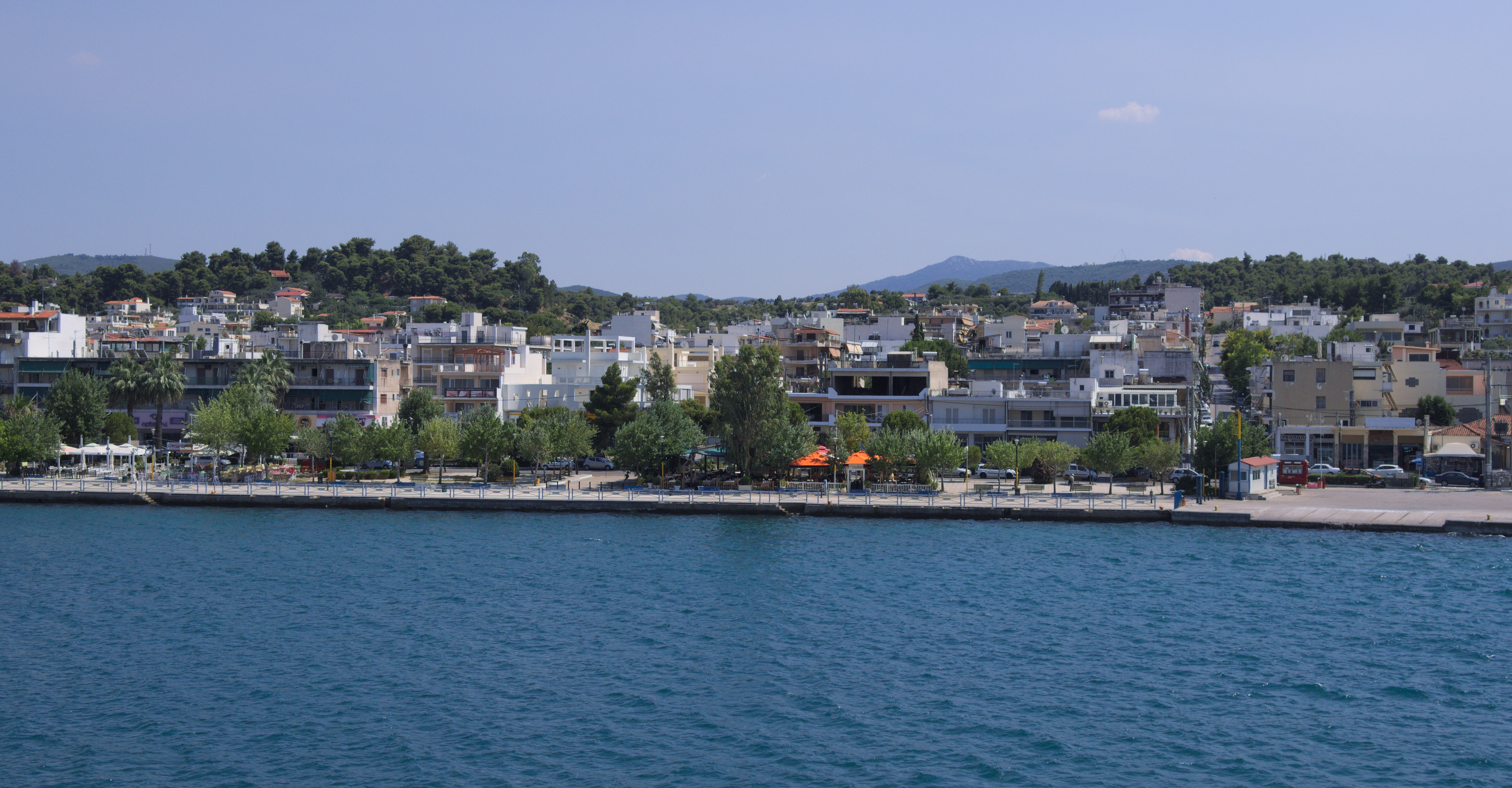
- A view

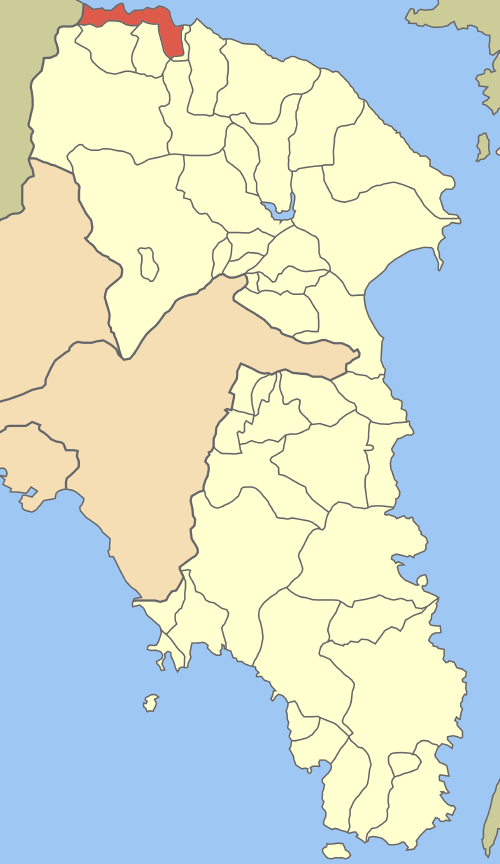
- Location within the regional unit

- Location within Greece
- Coordinates: 38°19′N 23°48′E
- Country: Greece
- Administrative region: Attica
- Regional unit: East Attica
- Municipality: Oropos
- Municipal unit: Oropioi

Area
  - Community: 12.398 km^{2} (4.787 sq mi)
- Elevation: 9 m (30 ft)

Population (2021)
  - Community: 1,765
  - Density: 142.4/km^{2} (368.7/sq mi)
- Time zone: UTC+2 (EET)
  - Summer (DST): UTC+3 (EEST)
- Postal code: 190 15
- Area code: 22950
- Vehicle registration: ZB-ZY

Skala Oropou (Greek: Σκάλα Ωρωπού meaning "Ladder of Oropos") is city center, and central port, in East Attica, Greece, on the South Gulf of Euboea, due north of Athens city center. Since the 2011 local government reform it is part of the municipality Oropos, of which it is a community. It is part of Athens metropolitan area.

== Geography ==
Skala Oropou is a seaside town, situated on the south coast of the South Euboean Gulf. The town Nea Palatia is directly adjacent to its east. It is 8 km south of Eretria (on the island Euboea), and 38 km north of Athens city center. The Greek National Road 79 connects it with the A1 motorway (Athens–Thessaloniki–Evzonoi) near Malakasa. The mouth of the river Asopos lies between Skala Oropou and the western village Chalkoutsi.

Since 2014, when Chalkoutsi became a separate community, the community consists of the villages Skala Oropou and Nea Politeia.

Δημοτική Κοινότητα Σκάλας Ωρωπού: 1.765 κάτοικοι

== Historical population ==
Year	Village population	Community population
1991	1,295	3,142
2001	1,289	3,775
2011	1,430	4,146
2021	1,082	1,765
