= Sykamino =

Sykamino Συκάμινο
- Municipal unit
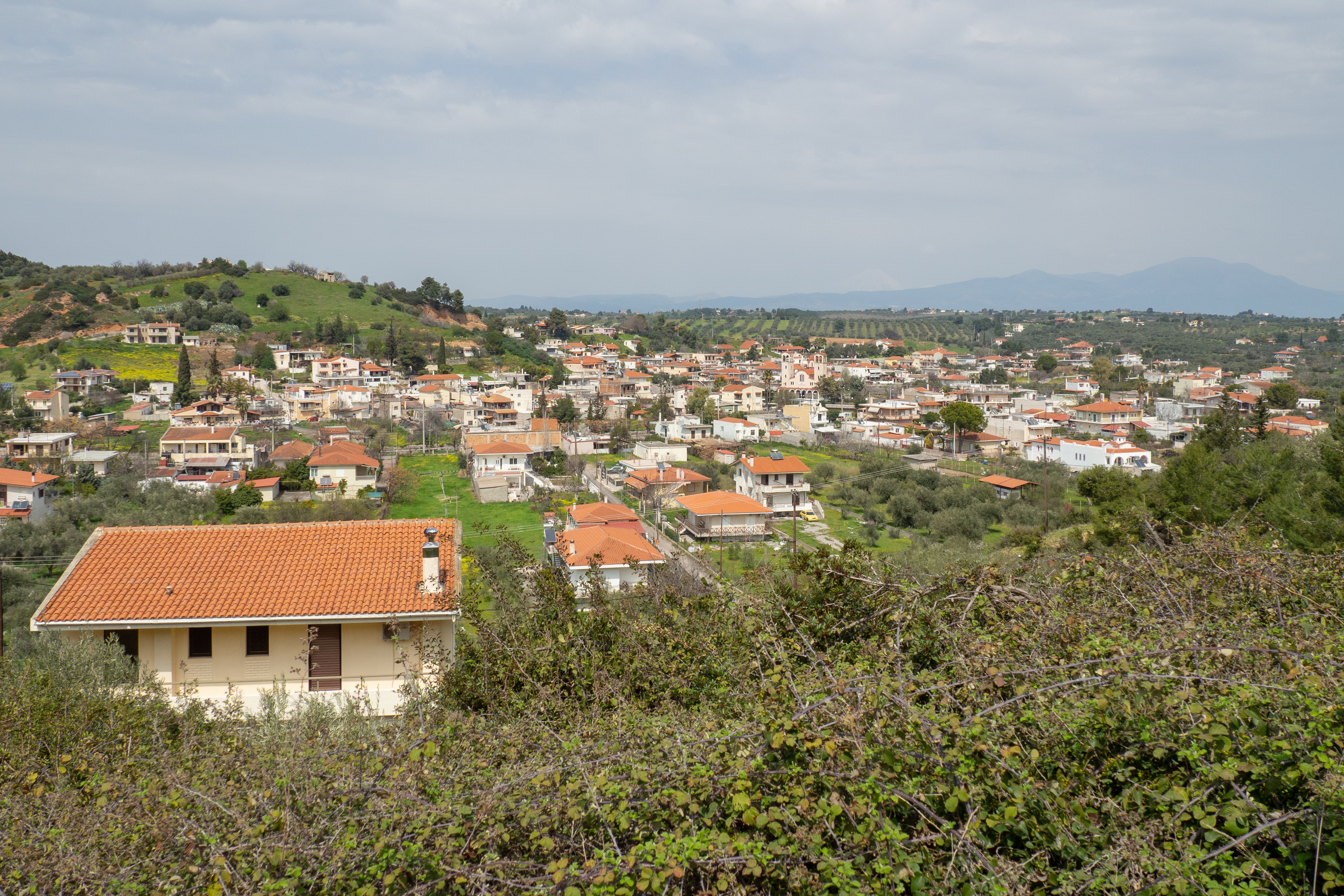
- View of Sykamino

- Location within the regional unit

- Location within Greece
- Coordinates: 38°18′N 23°43′E
- Country: Greece
- Administrative region: Attica
- Regional unit: East Attica
- Municipality: Oropos

Area
  - Municipal unit: 15.643 km^{2} (6.040 sq mi)
- Elevation: 35 m (115 ft)

Population (2021)
  - Municipal unit: 1,677
  - Municipal unit density: 107.2/km^{2} (277.7/sq mi)
- Time zone: UTC+2 (EET)
  - Summer (DST): UTC+3 (EEST)
- Postal code: 190 15
- Area code: 22950
- Vehicle registration: Z

Sykamino (Greek: Συκάμινο meaning mulberry) is a town and former community of Attica, Greece. Since the 2011 local government reform it is part of the municipality Oropos, of which it is a municipal unit. Sykamino has historically been an Arvanite settlement.

Sykamino is located in the extreme northwestern part of East Attica, on the river Asopos. Sykamino is located east of Thebes and south of Chalcis. The municipal unit has a land area of 15.643 km^{2} and a population of 1,677 inhabitants at the 2021 census. Besides the town of Sykámino, other villages in the municipal unit are Néo Sykámino, Pefkiás, Kamári, and Katifóri.

== Historical population ==
| Year | Village population | Community population |
|---|---|---|
| 1981 | 589 | - |
| 1991 | 809 | 1,045 |
| 2001 | 865 | 1,522 |
| 2011 | 910 | 1,613 |
| 2021 | 915 | 1,677 |
