= Pharae (Boeotia) =

Pharae (Ancient Greek: Φαραί) was an ancient city in Boeotia, Greece. The city was located a short distance from Tanagra. Coins from this city have been preserved dating from c. 550–480 BCE, and from c. 387–374 BCE. The location of the city is not known, but may possibly be at Agios Pantaleimon, 5 kilometres (3.1 mi) northeast of the village of Schimatari, where on the coast nearby is a village named Pharos.
