= Greek National Road 79 =

Trunk road in Greece

Coordinates: 38.2748°N 23.7915°E

National Road 79
- Εθνική Οδός 79
- Route of the EO79 road, in blue

Route information
- Length: 17.0 km (10.6 mi)
- Existed: 9 July 1963–present

Major junctions
- South end: Agios Merkourios
- North end: Skala Oropou

Location
- Country: Greece
- Regions: Attica
- Primary destinations: Agios Merkourios; Skala Oropou

Highway system
- Highways in Greece; Motorways; National roads
← EO78	→ EO80

Greek National Road 79 (Greek: Εθνική Οδός 79), abbreviated as the EO79, is a national road in East Attica, Greece. It connects St. Merkourios on Parnitha mountain, with Skala Oropou (Ferry boat to Eretria on Evia island). It goes through Sfendali (Proastiakos train) and Malakasa (exit 25 of the European route E75). It was one of the special routes of the Acropolis Rally all the way up to 2013.

== Route ==
The EO79 is officially defined as a north–south route located entirely within the municipality of Oropos, running between Agios Merkourios in the south and Skala Oropou in the north. The road connects with the A1 motorway and the EO1 at Malakasa.

== History ==
Ministerial Decision G25871 of 9 July 1963 created the EO79 from the old EO10, which existed by royal decree from 1955 until 1963, and followed the same route as the current EO79.
