= Parasopias =

Parasopias or Parasopiae or Parasopiai (Ancient Greek: Παρασωπιάς - meaning "near the Asopus") was a town of ancient Thessaly in the district Oetaea. Strabo indicates that it was part of the territories that belonged to the region of Mount Oeta and was near Heraclea Trachinia. The meaning of its name is due to the fact that beside it flowed the river Asopus. Strabo also called Parasopia the territory that was along another river also called Asopus that was in ancient Boeotia.

The town's site has not been located.
