= Mycalessus =

Town of ancient Boeotia

Coordinates: 38°24′57″N 23°32′45″E

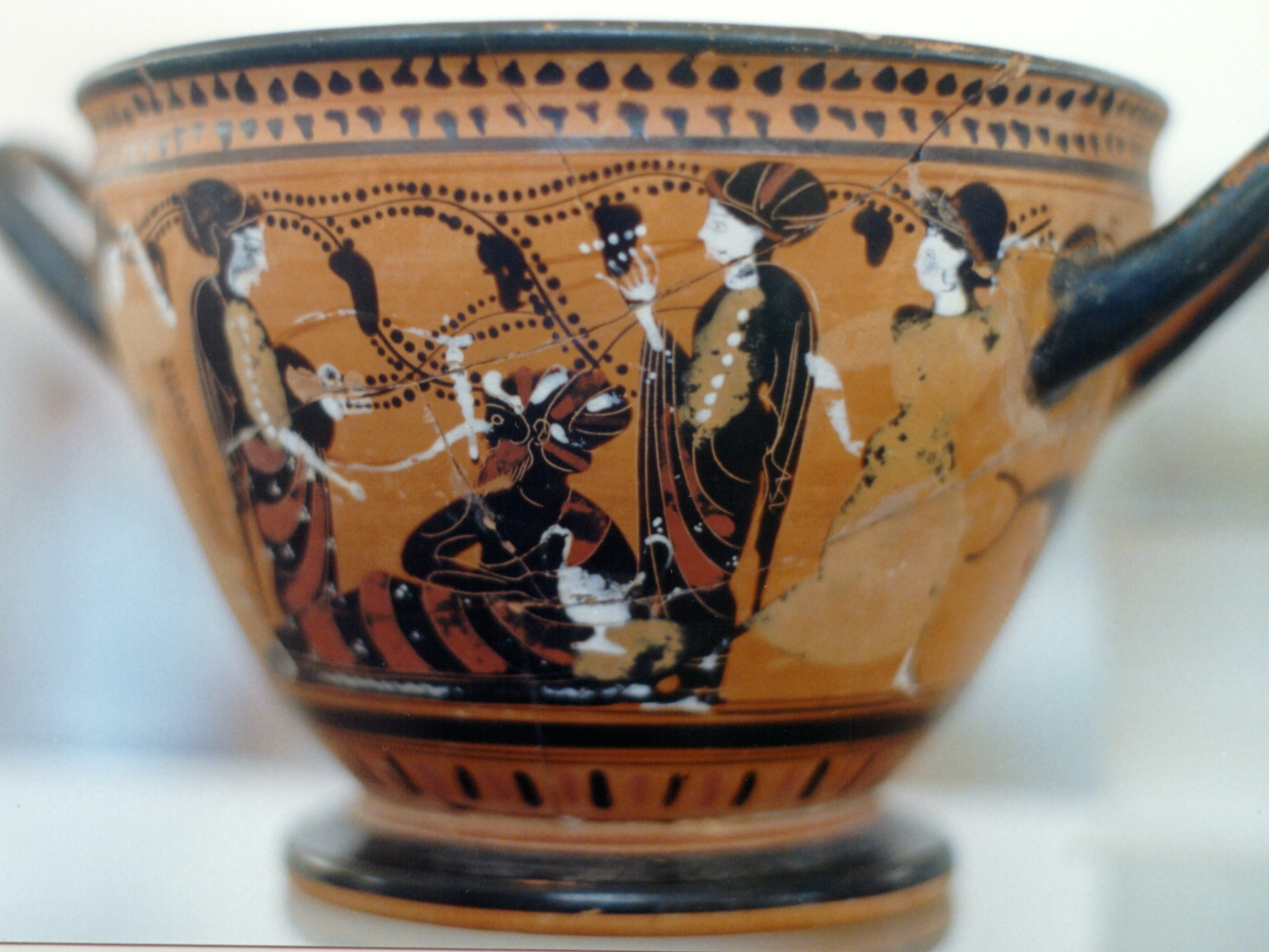
Skyphos showing Dionysus and female musicians dated to 520-520 BCE found at the ruins of Mycalessus

Mycalessus or Mykalessos (Ancient Greek: Μυκαλησσός) was a town of ancient Boeotia, mentioned by Homer in the Catalogue of Ships in the Iliad. It was said to have been so called, because the cow, which was guiding Cadmus and his comrades to Thebes, lowed (ἐμυκήσατο) in this place. In 413 BCE, some Thracians, whom the Athenians were sending home to their own country, were landed on the Euripus, and surprised Mycalessus. They not only sacked the town, but put all the inhabitants to the sword, not sparing even the women and children. Thucydides says that this was one of the greatest calamities that had ever befallen any city. Strabo calls Mycalessus a village in the territory of Tanagra, and places it upon the road from Thebes to Chalcis.

In the time of Pausanias it had ceased to exist; and this writer saw the ruins of Harma and Mycalessus on his road to Chalcis. Pausanias mentions a temple of Demeter Mycalessia, standing in the territory of the city upon the sea-coast, and situated to the right of the Euripus, by which he evidently meant south of the strait. The only other indication of the position of Mycalessus is the statement of Thucydides, that it was 16 stadia distant from the Hermaeum, which was on the sea-shore near the Euripus.

Its site is located near modern Ritsona.
