= Harma (Boeotia) =

Coordinates: 38°23′18″N 23°29′12″E

Harma (Ancient Greek: Ἅρμα) was a town of ancient Boeotia, mentioned by Homer in the Catalogue of Ships in the Iliad, which is said to have been so called, either because the chariot of Adrastus broke down here, or because the chariot of Amphiaraus disappeared in the earth at this place. Strabo describes it as a deserted village in the territory of Tanagra near Mycalessus; and Pausanias speaks of the ruins of Harma and Mycalessus as situated on the road from Thebes to Chalcis. Claudius Aelianus speaks of a lake called Harma.
