= Markopoulo Oropou =

Markopoulo Oropou Μαρκόπουλο Ωρωπού
- Municipal unit
- Location within the regional unit

- Location within Greece
- Coordinates: 38°17′N 23°49′E
- Country: Greece
- Administrative region: Attica
- Regional unit: East Attica
- Municipality: Oropos

Area
  - Municipal unit: 23.177 km^{2} (8.949 sq mi)
- Elevation: 94 m (308 ft)

Population (2021)
  - Municipal unit: 2,308
  - Municipal unit density: 99.58/km^{2} (257.9/sq mi)
- Time zone: UTC+2 (EET)
  - Summer (DST): UTC+3 (EEST)
- Postal code: 190 15
- Area code: 22950
- Vehicle registration: Z

Markopoulo Oropou (Greek: Μαρκόπουλο Ωρωπού) is a town and a former community of East Attica, Greece. Since the 2011 local government reform it is part of the municipality Oropos, of which it is a municipal unit. The municipal unit has an area of 23.177 km^{2}.

Markopoulo Oropou is situated 3 km south of the South Euboean Gulf coast. It is 4 km southeast of Nea Palatia and 35 km north of Athens city center. The municipal unit Markopoulo Oropou consists of the town Markopoulo and the villages Neo Livyssi, Agia Varvara and Bafi.

== Historical population ==
Year	Town population	Community population
1981	-	2,006
1991	877	2,208
2001	3,532	3,894
2011	2,549	2,798
2021	2,172	2,308

The village has historically been an Arvanite settlement.
