= Malakasa =

Malakasa Μαλακάσα
- Municipal unit
- Location within the regional unit

- Location within Greece
- Coordinates: 38°14′N 23°48′E
- Country: Greece
- Administrative region: Attica
- Regional unit: East Attica
- Municipality: Oropos

Area
  - Municipal unit: 30.195 km^{2} (11.658 sq mi)
- Elevation: 220 m (720 ft)

Population (2021)
  - Municipal unit: 1,851
  - Municipal unit density: 61.30/km^{2} (158.8/sq mi)
- Time zone: UTC+2 (EET)
  - Summer (DST): UTC+3 (EEST)
- Postal code: 190 11
- Area code: 22950
- Vehicle registration: ZB-ZY

Malakasa (Greek: Μαλακάσα) is a village and former community of East Attica in Greece. Since the 2011 local government reform it is part of the municipality Oropos, of which it is a municipal unit. The municipal unit has an area of 10.450 km^{2}. The municipal unit Malakasa consists of the villages Malakasa, Milesi and Sfendali.

Malakasa is situated on the northern edge of the Parnitha mountain range and 9 km south of the South Euboean Gulf coast. It is 29 km north of Athens city center. The A1 motorway (Athens–Thessaloniki–Evzonoi) passes south of the town. The Greek National Road 79 links Malakasa with Nea Palatia on the coast. Sfendali has a station on the railway from Athens to Thessaloniki.

== History ==
The village was founded by the incoming Albanian tribe of the Malakasioi, as can be seen in its name. Malakasa has historically been an Arvanite settlement.

== Historical population ==
Year	Village population	Community population
1981	884	-
1991	654	1,168
2001	622	1,405
2011	514	1,049
2021	1,334	1,851

== Bibliography ==
- Valentini, Giuseppe (1956). Il diritto delle comunità nella tradizione giuridica albanese; generalità. Vallecchi.
