= Oropos =

Town in Attica, Greece

Oropos Ωρωπός
- Municipality
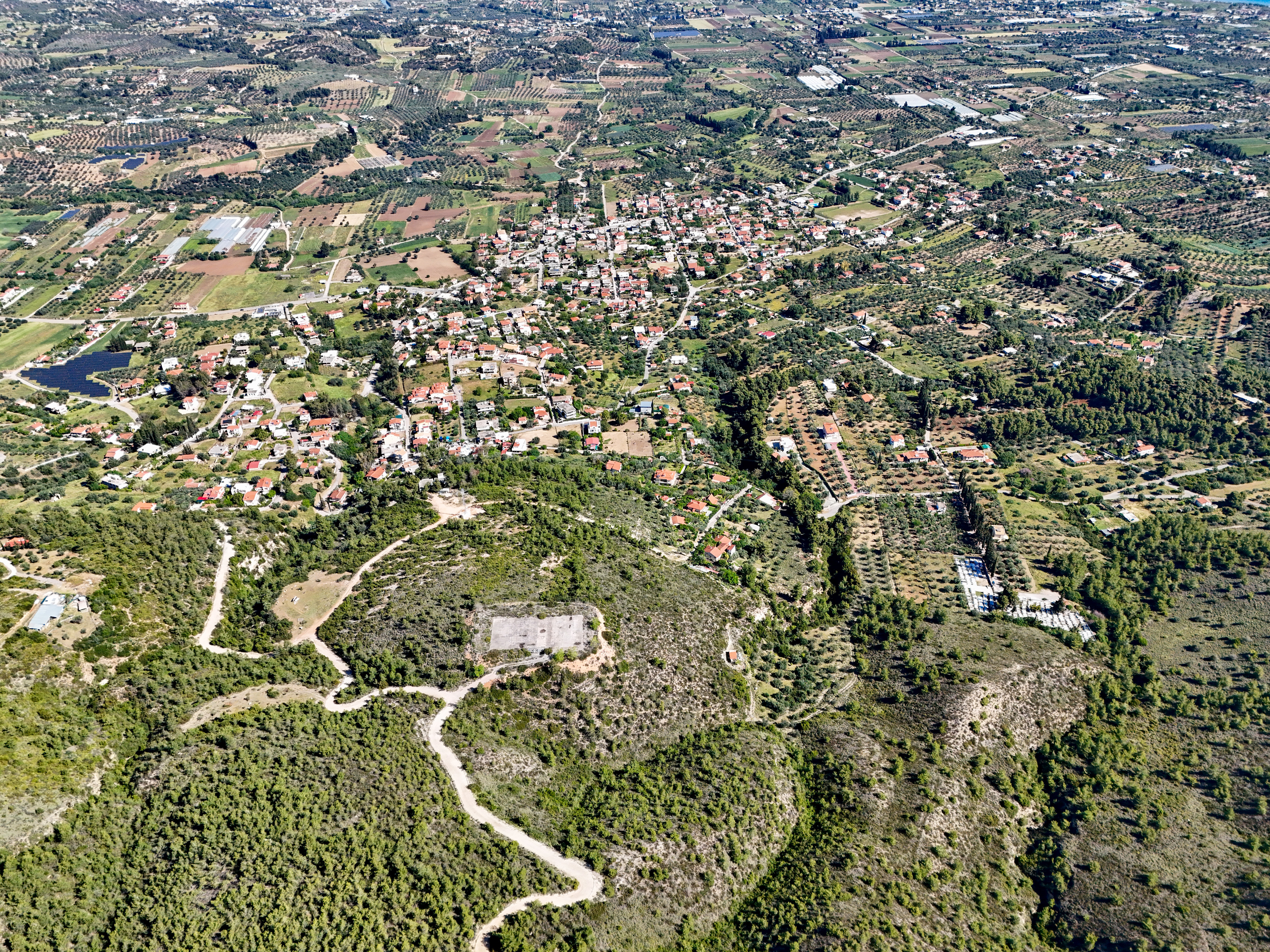
- Aerial view of Oropos

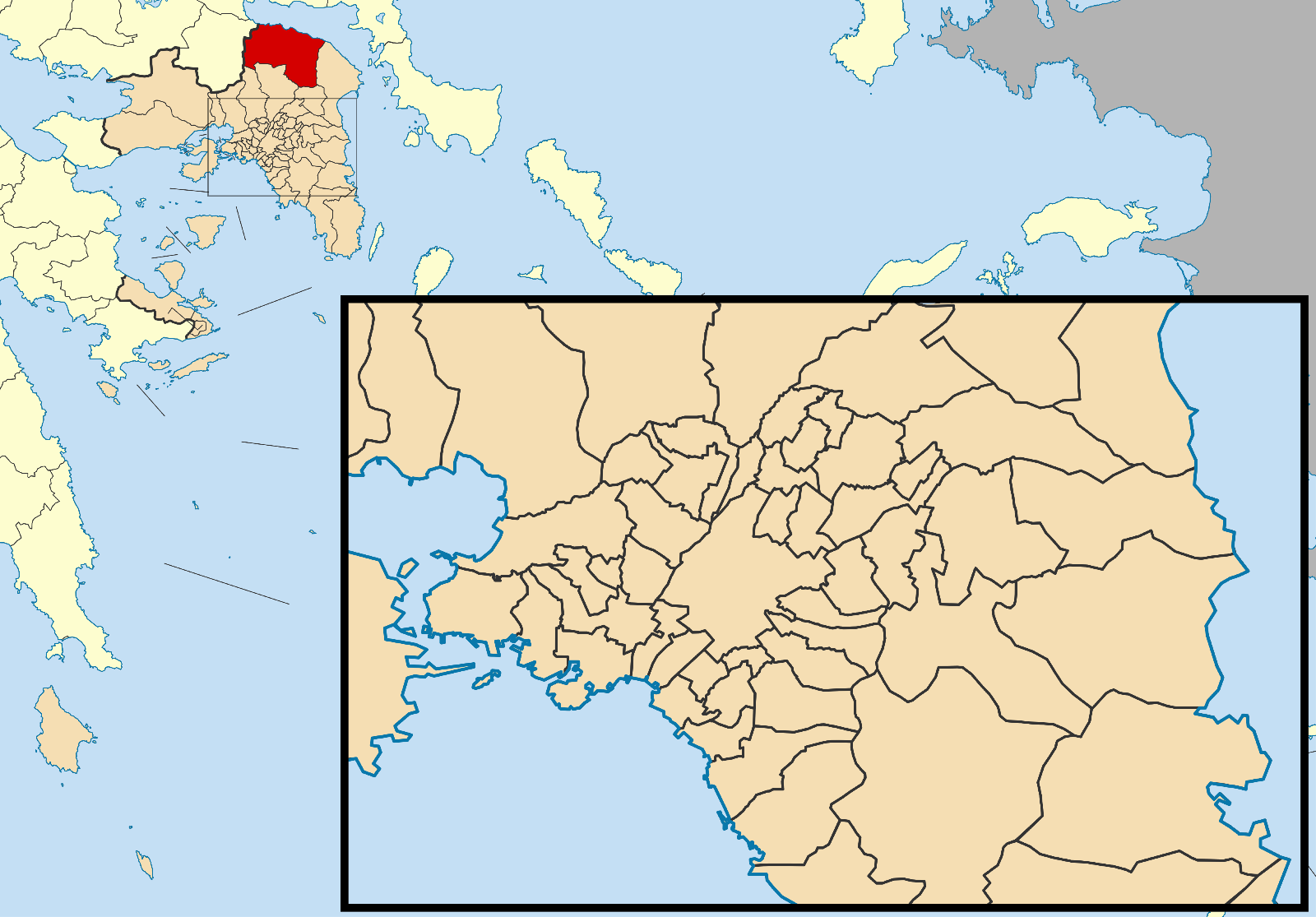

- Location within Greece
- Coordinates: 38°18′N 23°45′E
- Country: Greece
- Administrative region: Attica
- Regional unit: East Attica

Area
  - Municipality: 338.18 km^{2} (130.57 sq mi)
  - Community: 11.97 km^{2} (4.62 sq mi)
- Elevation: 40 m (130 ft)

Population (2021)
  - Municipality: 31,811
  - Density: 94.065/km^{2} (243.63/sq mi)
  - Community: 1,448
  - Community density: 121.0/km^{2} (313.3/sq mi)
- Time zone: UTC+2 (EET)
  - Summer (DST): UTC+3 (EEST)
- Postal code: 190 15
- Area code: 22950
- Vehicle registration: Z
- Website: oropos.gov.gr

Oropos (Greek: Ωρωπός) is a small town and a municipality in East Attica, Greece.

The village of Skala Oropou, within the bounds of the municipality, was the site an important ancient Greek city, Oropus, and the famous nearby sanctuary of Amphiaraos is still visible today.

== Name ==
The town is known as Oropos in Greek and has been called Ropό in Arvantic.

== Geography ==
The municipality Oropos stretches between the Parnitha mountains and the South Euboean Gulf, opposite Eretria (on the island Euboea). The town Oropos, the seat of the municipality, is situated on the lower course of the river Asopos, 4 km south of the coast. It lies 4 km southwest of Nea Palatia and 55 km north of Athens city center. The community Oropos consists of the town Oropos and the nearby villages Kampos and Platania. The municipality has an area of 338.183 km^{2}, the community 11.967 km^{2}.

== Municipality ==
The present municipality Oropos was formed at the 2011 local government reform by the merger of the following 9 former municipalities, that became municipal units (constituent communities in brackets):

- Afidnes
- Avlonas
- Kalamos
- Kapandriti
- Malakasa
- Markopoulo Oropou
- Oropioi (Nea Palatia, Skala Oropou and Oropos)
- Polydendri
- Sykamino

== History ==
The sanctuary for the oracle of Amphiaraus at Oropos is east of Delphi, northeast of Athens

Oropos was founded by colonists from Eretria; it was either located in or identical with Graea. In ancient times, it was a border city between Boeotia and Attica, and its possession was a continual cause of dispute between the two states; but ultimately it came into possession of Athens, and was always an Attic town, even during the Roman Empire. The actual harbour, which was called Delphinium, was at the mouth of the Asopus, about a mile (1.6 km) north of the city.

The famous Sanctuary of Amphiaraos was situated in the territory of Oropus, 12 stadia from the city. The site has been excavated by the Greek Archaeological Society; it contained a temple, a sacred spring, into which coins were thrown by worshippers, altars and porticoes, and a small theatre, of which the proskenion is well preserved. Worshippers used to consult the oracle of Amphiaraos by sleeping on the skin of a slaughtered ram within the sacred building. The village of Oropos has historically also been settled by Arvanites.

During the Regime of the Colonels composer Mikis Theodorakis was interned in the concentration camp at Oropos before going into exile in Paris.

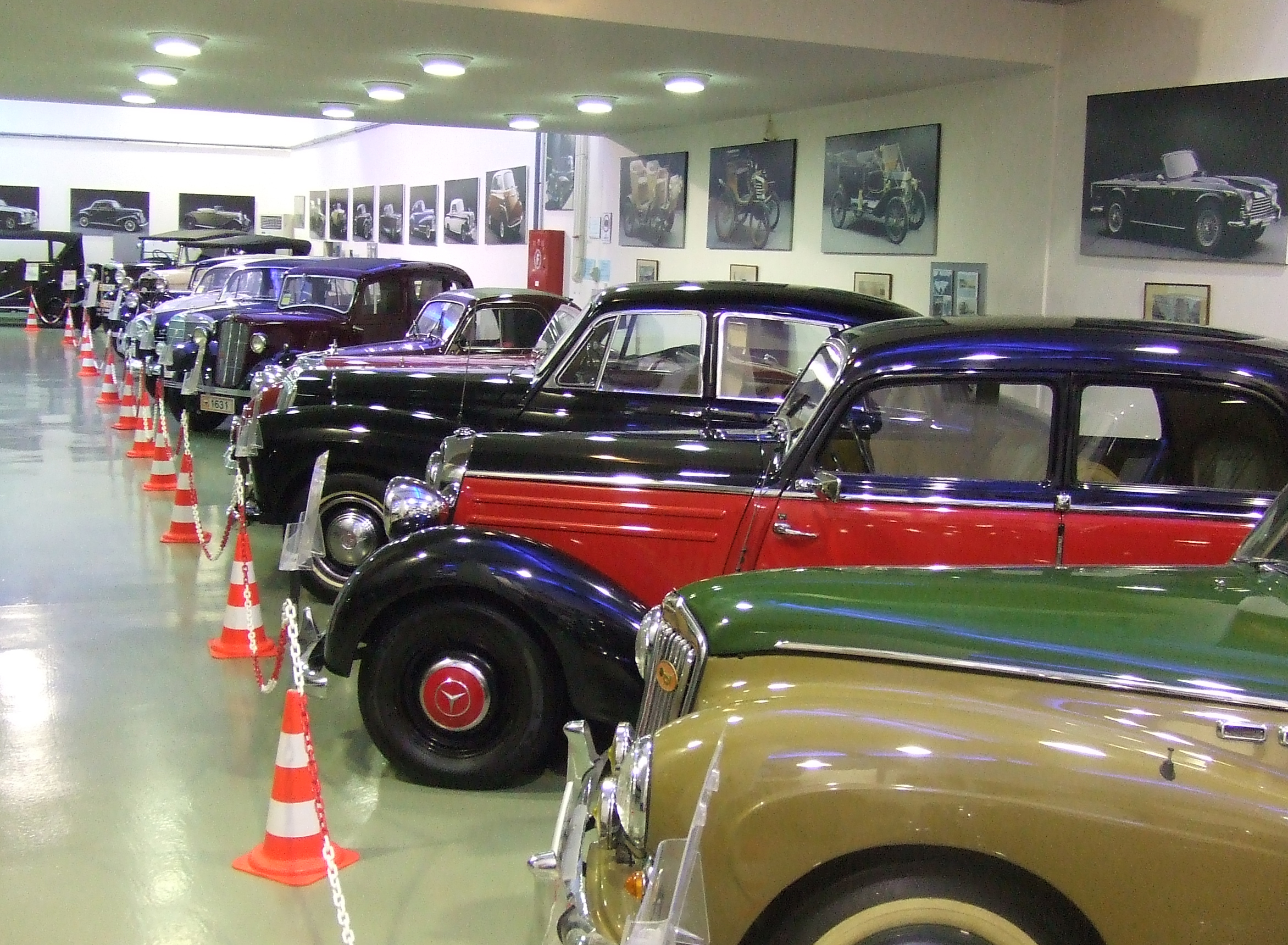
Automobile museum O Phaeton

== See also ==
- List of settlements in Attica
