= Asopos (Boeotia) =

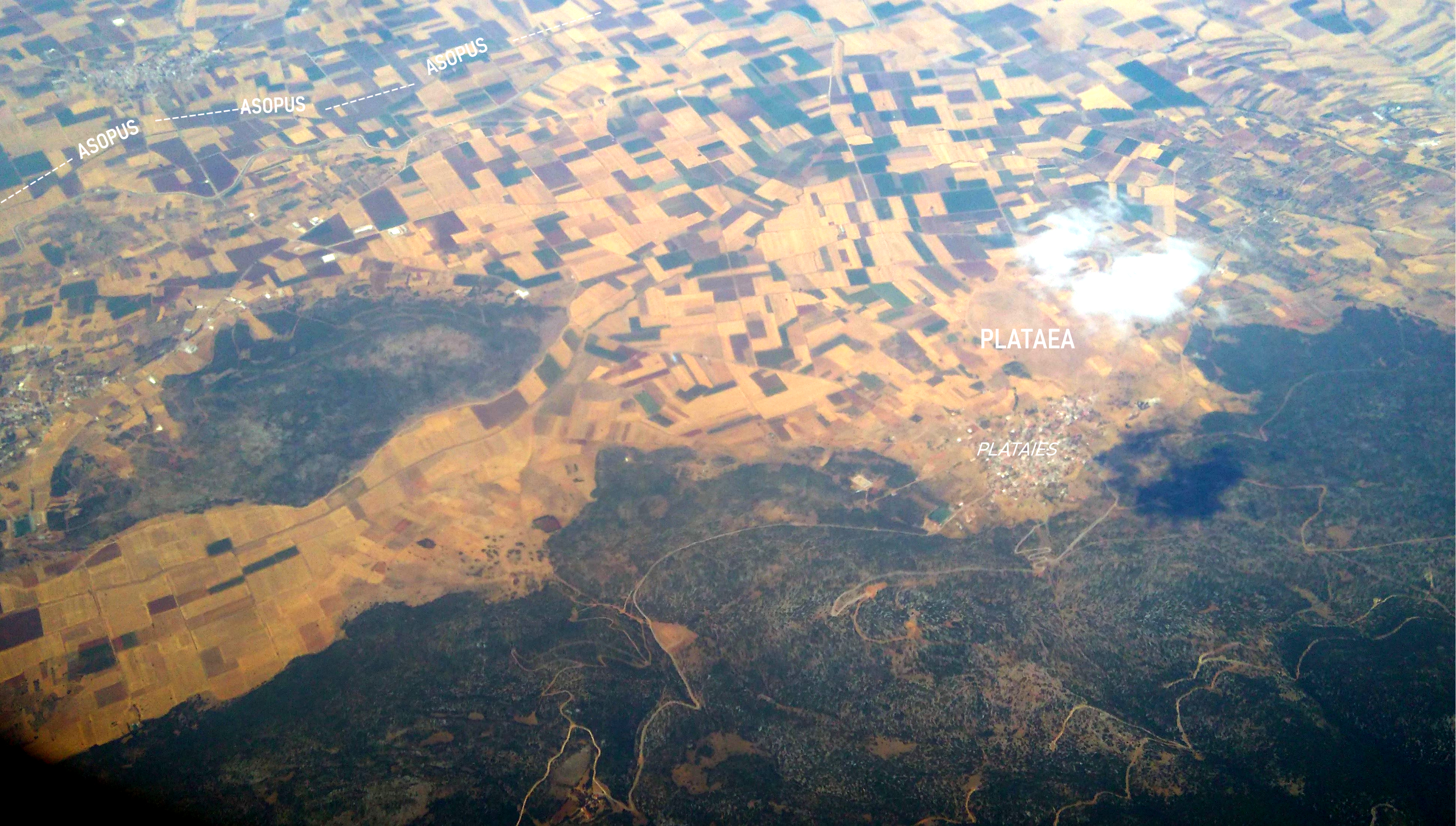
- The Asopos river appears in the top left corner of this view of the battlefield of the Battle of Plataea.

Location
- Country: Greece

Physical characteristics
- Source
  - location: Cithaeron mountain
- Mouth
  - location: South Euboean Gulf
  - coordinates: 38°20′7″N 23°44′28″E
- Length: 57 km (35 mi)
- Basin size: 718 km^{2} (277 sq mi)

The Asopos (Greek: Ασωπός, referred to in Latin sources as Asopus) is a river in Boeotia and northern Attica, Greece. In antiquity, it formed the border between the cities of Thebes and Plataea. The Battle of Plataea was fought on its banks. According to Pausanias (5.14.3) the Boeotian Asopus can produce the tallest reeds of any river.

Its source is on the northern slope of the Cithaeron mountain, southwest of Thebes. It empties into the South Euboean Gulf, near Skala Oropou. Its total length is 57 km. Its basin is 718 km^{2}. The Asopos flows along the following places, from the source downstream: Lefktra, Agios Thomas, Oinofyta, Sykamino, Skala Oropou. The river is polluted with hexavalent chromium due to industrial activity.

== Mythology ==
Pausanias (9.1.1) cites Plataean tradition that Asopus was ancient king of that region in succession to King Cithaeron who gave his name to the mountain as King Asopus gave his name to the river and that the city Plataea was named after Plataea daughter of the river Asopus. Pausanias then comments that he thinks that this eponymous Plataea was daughter of King Asopus rather than of the river Asopus.

Oroe, a tributary river of Boeotian Asopus is termed by Herodotus (9.51.2) and Pausanias (9.4.4) daughter of Asopus. Pausanias says that the Boeotian city of Thespiae was named either from Thespia, daughter of Asopus or from Thespius, a descendant of Erechtheus who came there from Athens. This Thespius is otherwise unknown to us. Finally Antiope mother of Amphion and Zethus by Zeus is sometimes a daughter of Asopus.

Statius's Thebaid tells of the warrior Hypseus, mortal son of Asopus, who leads the men of Alalcomene, Itone, Midea, Arne, Aulida, Graea, Plataea, Pleteon, and Anthedon. This Hypseus is slain by Capaneus.
