= 450s BC =

This article concerns the period 459 BC – 450 BC.

== Events ==
=== By place ===
==== Greece ====
- Athens allied itself with the city state of Megara which was under pressure from Corinth. This alliance leads to war between Corinth and Athens. The first battle of the war, at Haliesis in the Gulf of Argolis, resulted in a Corinthian victory, but the next battle, the battle of Cecryphalea (modern Angistrion), went Athens' way.

==== Roman Republic ====
- The Aequi occupied Tusculum. In response to the threat, the Roman Senate decided to send an army to help the allied city, under the command of consul Lucius Cornelius Maluginensis. In addition, the consul Fabius Vibulanus, who was at that point besieging Antium, moved his forces to attack Tusculum. The Tusculans were able to recapture their city. A truce was then arranged with the Aequi.

==== Sicily ====
- The Sicilian town of Morgantina was destroyed by Ducetius, Hellenised leader of the Siculi (according to Diodorus Siculus).

== 458 BC ==
=== By place ===
==== Greece ====
- Pleistoanax succeeds Pleistarchus as king of Sparta.
- Pericles continues Ephialtes' democratising activities by making the archonship a paid office and the lower class of Athenian citizens eligible to hold the office.
- The Athenians start constructing the Long Walls to protect the route from the main city to their main port (Piraeus).
- Aegina joins the Peloponnesian alliance, but their combined fleet is defeated by the Athenians in the Battle of Aegina. The Athenians, under the command of Leocrates, land on the island of Aegina and besiege and defeat the city. Aegina is forced to pay tribute to Athens.

==== Roman Republic ====
- The Roman general Lucius Quinctius Cincinnatus is summoned by the Roman Senate to defend the city from attack by the approaching Aequi. He is named dictator of Rome for six months. He goes on to defeat the enemy in a single day at the Battle of Mount Algidus and celebrates a triumph in Rome. Sixteen days after the battle, he resigns his dictatorship and returns to his farm.

=== By topic ===
==== Literature ====
- The Athenian playwright Aeschylus completes his trilogy The Oresteia (which comprise Agamemnon, Choephoroi (The Libation Bearers) and The Eumenides).

== 457 BC ==
=== By place ===
==== Greece ====
- Athens, the leader of the Delian League, comes into conflict with Corinth and its ally Sparta (leader of the Peloponnesian League) over Megara. Nicomedes of Sparta, regent for King Pleistoanax, leads an army of 11,500 hoplites into Boeotia to help Thebes put down a rebellion by Phocis.
- Athenian forces block the routes back to the Peloponnese, so the Spartans decide to remain in Boeotia and await the Athenian attack. The Athenians and their allies, with 14,000 men under the command of Myronides, meet the Spartans at Battle of Tanagra. The Spartans win the battle, but they lose many men and so are unable to follow up on their victory.
- The Athenians regroup after the battle and march into Boeotia. Led by Myronides, the Athenians defeat the Boeotians in the Battle of Oenophyta, and then destroy the walls of Tanagra and ravage Locris and Phocis.
- Athens goes on to defeat Aegina later in the year, and to finish the construction of the Long Walls to the Athenian port of Piraeus (an action opposed by Sparta).
- Boeotia, Phocis and Opuntian Locris become members of the Delian League. Athens now has enrolled in the Delian League all the Boeotian cities except Thebes. Aegina is forced to become a member of the League. It is assessed, with Thasos, for a yearly contribution to the League of 30 talents.
- The Zeus Temple at Olympia is completed. The forty-foot statue of Zeus inside it becomes one of the Seven Wonders of the Ancient World.

== 456 BC ==
=== By place ===
==== Greece ====
- The first of the Athenian sculptor Phidias' monuments to Athena, the bronze Athena Promachos, is placed on the Athenian Acropolis, measuring about 9 metres high.
- The temple of Zeus in Olympia is finished.

== 455 BC ==
=== By place ===
==== Greece ====
- Athens, under Athenian general Tolmides, sends 100 ships around the Peloponnesus and they set fire to the Spartan naval base at Gythion. As a result, Athens gains the agreement of the Achaean cities to join the Delian League. Athenian forces then go on to attack the Spartan allies on the Corinthian Gulf. Athens is now able to confine Sparta to the southern Peloponnesus.
- The Athenians suffer a severe defeat in Egypt at the hands of the Persians. After being cut off in the Nile Delta, the Athenian fleet is defeated, and the Athenian army retreats across the Sinai Desert to Byblos before its remnants are rescued. The Egyptian rebel Inaros is crucified by the Persians. The Athenians decide against any further military activity in Egypt.

==== China ====
- Spring and Autumn period: The Battle of Jinyang begins with the armies of Zhi, Wei and Han laying siege to Jinyang.

=== By topic ===
==== Literature ====
- Euripides presents his earliest known tragedy, Peliades, in the Athenian festival of Dionysia.

== 454 BC ==
=== By place ===
==== Persian Empire ====
- Persian rule in Egypt is finally restored by Megabyzus, satrap of Syria, after a prolonged struggle which has included dealing with a military intervention by Athens. The leader of the revolt, Inaros II, is crucified by the Persians.

==== India ====
- Mahavira attains Kevala Jnana at the age of 43, according to the Śvetāmbara branch of Jain philosophy.

==== Greece ====
- Pericles leads a naval expedition in the Corinthian Gulf, in which Athens defeats Achaea. He then attacks Sicyon and Acarnania, after which he unsuccessfully tries to take Oeniadea on the Corinthian Gulf, before returning to Athens.
- Pericles declares that the Delian League's considerable treasury at Delos is not safe from the Persian navy and has the treasury transferred to Athens, thus strengthening Athens' power over the League.

==== Roman Republic ====
- The Roman Plebs, suffering from a number of economic and financial ills, force the city’s patricians to begin the reform and codification of the law. As a first act, a three-man commission is sent to Athens to study that city's laws.

==== Sicily ====
- Hostilities between Segesta and Selinunte, two Greek cities on Sicily, take place over access to the Tyrrhenian Sea.

== 453 BC ==
=== Italy ===
- Ducetius founds the town of Palice

==== Greece ====
- Pericles, the ruler of Athens, bestows generous wages on all Athens' citizens who serve as jurymen on the Heliaia (the supreme court of Athens).
- Achaea, on the southern shore of the Corinthian Gulf, becomes part of what is effectively now the Athenian Empire. The Delian League had changed from an alliance into an empire clearly under the control of Athens.

==== China ====
- May 8 – The Chinese city of Jinyang is severely flooded in the Battle of Jinyang, where the elite families of Jin, Zhao, Zhi, Wei and Han fight. The Wei and the Han swap allegiances to side with Zhao and eliminate the Zhi house, ending the Spring and Autumn period of Chinese history.

== 452 BC ==
- An outbreak of plague spreads throughout Italy.

== 451 BC ==
=== By place ===
==== Greece ====
- The Persian fleet moves against a rebellious Cyprus to restore order. Kimon, who returns to favour, though not to power, in Athens, plans an expedition to help Cyprus. He gains Pericles' support.
- An Athenian law sponsored by Pericles is passed giving citizenship only to those born of Athenian parents. This marks an end to the policy where residents who were from other cities could be given an honourable status.
- Hostilities among the Greek states come to a formal end with the agreement to the Five Years' Truce. Kimon negotiates a five year truce with Sparta, in which Athens agrees to abandon its alliance with Argos, while Sparta promises to give up its alliance with Thebes. During the same year Argos signs the first "Thirty-Years Peace" with Sparta.

==== Roman Republic ====
- Following the report of a three-man commission into the design of Roman law, the patricians set up in Rome a Board of Ten, the Decemviri. The first Decemviri, composed entirely of patricians is led by consuls Appius Claudius Crassus and Titus Genucius Augurinus. The first ten codes of the Roman Law of the Twelve Tables are completed by the first Decemvirate.

== 450 BC ==
=== By place ===
==== Greece ====
- Athenian general Cimon sails to Cyprus with two hundred triremes of the Delian League. From there, he sends sixty ships to Egypt to help the Egyptians under Amyrtaeus, who are fighting the Persians in the Nile Delta. Cimon uses the remaining ships to aid an uprising of the Cypriot Greek city-states against Persian control of the island. He lays siege to the Persian stronghold of Citium on the southern west coast of Cyprus. However, the siege fails and Cyprus remains under Phoenician (and Persian) control.
- During the siege Cimon dies and command of the fleet is given to Anaxicrates, who leaves Citium to engage the Phoenician fleet in the Battle of Salamis in Cyprus. The Greek fleet is victorious against the Persians and their allies and then returns to Athens.
- The Athenians reduce the tribute due from their subject city-states (i.e. members of the Delian League), and each city is allowed to issue its own coinage.
- 5,000 talents are transferred to the treasury of the Delian League in Athens.

==== Macedonia ====
- Perdiccas II succeeds Alexander I as king of Macedonia (approximate date).

==== Roman Republic ====
- The success of the first Decemvirate prompts the appointment of a second Decemvirate which also includes plebeians amongst its members. This second decemviri adds two more headings to their predecessor's ten, completing the Law of the Twelve Tables (Lex Duodecim Tabularum), which will form the centrepiece of Roman law for the next several centuries. Nevertheless, this Decemvirate's rule becomes increasingly violent and tyrannical.

==== Sicily ====
- After minor preliminary successes (including the capture of Inessa from its Greek colonists), Ducetius, a Hellenised leader of the Siculi, an ancient people of Sicily, is decisively defeated by the combined forces of Syracuse and Acragas. Ducetius flees to exile in Corinth.

=== By topic ===
==== Arts ====
- The Severe (Early Classical) period of sculpture ends in Ancient Greece and is succeeded by the Mature Classical period (approximate date).
- Polykleitos of Argos develops a set of rules (The Canon) for constructing the ideal human figure (approximate date).
- Polygnotos of Thasos ceases his work (approximate date).
- The old bouleuterion, the west side of the agora in Athens, is built (approximate date).
- Polykleitos starts making the bronze statue Achilles (also known as The Spear Bearer or Doryphoros), which he finishes about ten years later. A Roman copy of the original bronze is now kept in the Museo Archeologico Nazionale in Naples, Italy (approximate date).
- The grave stela from Paros, Little girl with a bird, is made. It is now kept at The Metropolitan Museum of Art in New York (approximate date).
- The statue Woman and maid in the style of Achilles Painter, white-ground and black-figure decoration on a lekythos, with additional painting in tempera, starts being made (finished about ten years later). It is now kept at the Museum of Fine Arts in Boston (approximate date).
- Myron makes a bronze statue called The Discus Thrower (Discobolus). A Roman copy is now kept at Museo Nazionale Romano, Rome (approximate date).
- The Corinthian order makes its first appearance in Greek architecture (approximate date).
- The red-figure decorations A Painter, Assistants Crowned by Athena and Victories are made on a hydria in Athens. They are now kept in a private collection (approximate date).

== Births ==
456 BC

- Aristophanes, Greek playwright (d. c. 386 BC)

450 BC

- Alcibiades, Athenian general and politician (d. 404 BC)
- Aristophanes, Greek playwright (approximate year)

== Deaths ==
458 BC

- Pleistarchus, King of Sparta since 480 BC

456 BC

- Aeschylus, Greek playwright (b. 525 BC)

454 BC

- Alexander I of Macedon

453 BC

- Spurius Furius Medullinus Fusus
- Publius Curiatius Fistus Trigeminus
- Sextus Quinctilius

452 BC

- Sextus Quinctilius, consul of the Roman Republic, 453–452 BC, plague.

450 BC

- Cimon, Athenian statesman and general (b. c. 510 BC)
- Alexander I, king of Macedonia (approximate date)
