= 458 BC =

458 BC in various calendars
Gregorian calendar	458 BC; CDLVIII BC
Ab urbe condita	296
Ancient Egypt era	XXVII dynasty, 68
Pharaoh	Artaxerxes I of Persia, 8
Ancient Greek Olympiad (summer)	80th Olympiad, year 3
Assyrian calendar	4293
Balinese saka calendar	N/A
Bengali calendar	−1051 – −1050
Berber calendar	493
Buddhist calendar	87
Burmese calendar	−1095
Byzantine calendar	5051–5052
Chinese calendar	壬午年 (Water Horse); 2240 or 2033 — to — 癸未年 (Water Goat); 2241 or 2034
Coptic calendar	−741 – −740
Discordian calendar	709
Ethiopian calendar	−465 – −464
Hebrew calendar	3303–3304
- Hindu calendars
Vikram Samvat	−401 – −400
Shaka Samvat	N/A
Kali Yuga	2643–2644
Holocene calendar	9543
Iranian calendar	1079 BP – 1078 BP
Islamic calendar	1112 BH – 1111 BH
Javanese calendar	N/A
Julian calendar	N/A
Korean calendar	1876
Minguo calendar	2369 before ROC 民前2369年
Nanakshahi calendar	−1925
Thai solar calendar	85–86
Tibetan calendar	ཆུ་ཕོ་རྟ་ལོ་ (male Water-Horse) −331 or −712 or −1484 — to — ཆུ་མོ་ལུག་ལོ་ (female Water-Sheep) −330 or −711 or −1483

Year 458 BC was a year of the pre-Julian Roman calendar. At the time, it was known as the Year of the Consulship of Rutilus and Carvetus (or, less frequently, year 296 Ab urbe condita). The denomination 458 BC for this year has been used since the early medieval period, when the Anno Domini calendar era became the prevalent method in Europe for naming years.

== Events ==
=== By place ===
==== Greece ====
- Pleistoanax succeeds Pleistarchus as king of Sparta.
- Pericles continues Ephialtes' democratising activities by making the archonship a paid office and the lower class of Athenian citizens eligible to hold the office.
- The Athenians start constructing the Long Walls to protect the route from the main city to their main port (Piraeus).
- Aegina joins the Peloponnesian alliance, but their combined fleet is defeated by the Athenians in the Battle of Aegina. The Athenians, under the command of Leocrates, land on the island of Aegina and besiege and defeat the city. Aegina is forced to pay tribute to Athens.

==== Roman Republic ====
- The Roman general Lucius Quinctius Cincinnatus is summoned by the Roman Senate to defend the city from attack by the approaching Aequi. He is named dictator of Rome for six months. He goes on to defeat the enemy in a single day at the Battle of Mount Algidus and celebrates a triumph in Rome. Sixteen days after the battle, he resigns his dictatorship and returns to his farm.

=== By topic ===
==== Literature ====
- The Athenian playwright Aeschylus completes his trilogy The Oresteia (which comprise Agamemnon, Choephoroi (The Libation Bearers) and The Eumenides).

== Deaths ==
- Pleistarchus, King of Sparta since 480 BC
