= Battle of Aegina =

Battle between Aegina (and its allies) and Athens (458–57 BC)

- Part of First Peloponnesian War
Date	458 – 457 BC (9 months)
Location	Aegina
Result	Athenian victory; Aegina becomes a tributary state

Belligerents
Aegina; Assisted by: Peloponnesian League; Corinth	Athens

Commanders and leaders
	Leocrates

Strength
80 ships (estimate); 300 Peloponnesian hoplites	

Casualties and losses
70 ships captured	

The Battle of Aegina was a battle that took place in 458 and 457 BCE between Aegina, aided by the Peloponnesian League, and Athens, as part of the First Peloponnesian War. The battle saw Athens capture most of the Aeginetan fleet; after it was besieged by the Athenians, Aegina surrendered and became a tributary state to the Delian League.

After various attempts by Athens to control the Saronic Gulf, including previous battles at Halieis and Kekryphaleia, Aegina decided to become hostile against Athens and join the war on the side of the Peloponnesian League. As a result, Athens opted to wage war against Aegina, sending a large fleet there under the command of Leocrates. While the Aeginetans were outnumbered, they still opted to conduct a naval battle against the Athenians, as they had recently constructed new triremes and were already skilled in naval combat.

The battle began in the summer of 458 BC; a modern estimate stated that there were a maximum of 80 Aeginetan ships present at the battle, though it also suggested the possibility of allied involvement. The Athenians won the naval battle — capturing 70 Aeginetan ships in the process — after which they landed on the island and began to besiege the city. To aid the Aeginetan army, the Peleponnesians sent 300 hoplites to assist them, while a Corinthian army attacked Megara, attempting to draw the Athenian army out of Aegina. However, these diversions proved unsuccessful.

In the spring of 457 BC, the Aeginetans were forced to surrender. Aegina was given the same punishment as other city-states that had revolted against Athens: it was forced to tear down its fortifications, hand over the rest of its fleet to Athens, and become a tributary member of the Delian League, paying an annual tribute of 30 talents.

== See also ==
- Battle of Tanagra (457 BC)
