= Pentecontaetia =

Greek history period from 479 to 431 BC

The Delian League before the outbreak of the Peloponnesian War in 431 BC.

Pentecontaetia (Greek: πεντηκονταετία, "the period of fifty years") is the term used to refer to the period in Ancient Greek history between the defeat of the second Persian invasion of Greece at Plataea in 479 BC and the beginning of the Peloponnesian War in 431 BC. The term originated with a scholiast commenting on Thucydides, who used it in their description of the period. The Pentecontaetia was marked by the rise of Athens as the dominant state in the Greek world and by the rise of Athenian democracy, a period also known as Golden Age of Athens. Since Thucydides focused his account on these developments, the term is generally used when discussing developments in and involving Athens.

Shortly after the Greek victory of 479 BC, Athens assumed the leadership of the Delian League, a coalition of states that wished to continue the war against Persia. This league experienced a number of successes and was soon established as the dominant military force of the Aegean. Athenian control over the league grew as some "allies" were reduced to the status of tribute-paying subjects and by the middle of the 5th century BC (the league treasury was moved from Delos to Athens in 454 BC) the league had been transformed into an Athenian empire. Athens benefited greatly from this tribute, undergoing a cultural renaissance and undertaking massive public building projects, including the Parthenon; Athenian democracy, meanwhile, developed into what is today called radical or Periclean democracy, in which the popular assembly of the citizens and the large, citizen juries exercised near-complete control over the state.

The later years of the Pentecontaetia were marked by increasing conflict between Athens and the traditional land powers of Greece, led by Sparta. Between 460 BC and 445 BC, Athens fought a shifting coalition of mainland powers in what is now known as the First Peloponnesian War. During the course of this conflict, Athens gained and then lost control of large areas of central Greece. The conflict was concluded by the Thirty Years' Peace, which lasted until the end of the Pentecontaetia and the beginning of the Peloponnesian War.

The eventual breakdown of the peace was triggered by increasing conflict between Athens and several of Sparta's allies. Athens' alliance with Corcyra and attack on Potidaea enraged Corinth, and the Megarian Decree imposed strict economic sanctions on Megara, another Spartan ally. These disputes, along with a general perception that Athenian power had grown too powerful, led to the breakdown of the Thirty Years Peace; the Peloponnesian War broke out in 431 BC.

== Timeline of the Pentecontaetia (480–431) ==
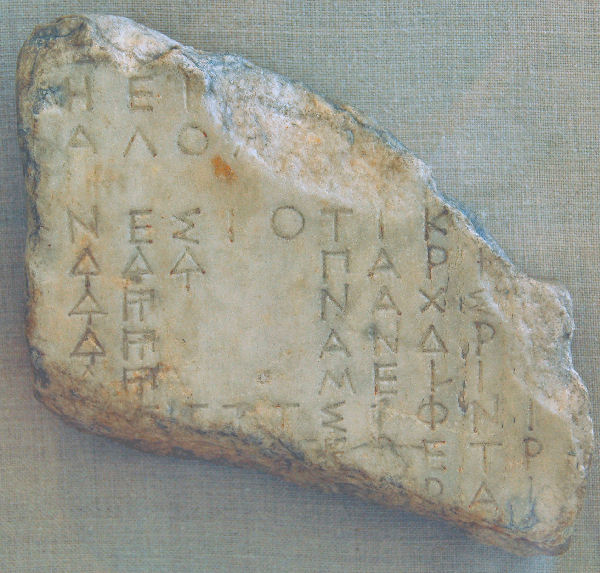
Fragment of the Athenian Tribute List, 425–424 BC.

479—Rebuilding of Athens: Although the Greeks were victorious in the Persian War, many Greeks believed that the Persians would retaliate. This led Athens to rebuild its city walls that were razed by the Persian Army during the occupation of Attica in 480.

478—Formation of the Delian League: Athens and other city states form a coalition against Persia.

477—The Conquest of Eion: Cimon, the son of Miltiades of Marathon fame, led Athens to numerous victorious campaigns and war profits. In 477, he led an army against Persian-occupied Eion in northern Greece. Athens was able to benefit from this invasion since the region was rich in timber, which was critical to building Athens' burgeoning naval fleet.

476—The Conquest of Scyros: The invasions continued with success on a par with Cimon's prior campaigns. In 476, Athens fought against the pirates of Scyros, as the Delian League wanted to reduce piracy around the region and capture the important materials for itself.

469—Operation in Asia Minor and the Battle of Eurymedon: From the beginning of 469 to 466, the Delian league led an army to Asia Minor against Persia. Cimon persuaded Greek settlements on the Carian and Lycian coast to rebel against Persia. This led the Persian army to mobilize a force to fight Cimon in the Battle of Eurymedon in Pamphylia. Cimon was able to defeat the Persian army swiftly and the war profits were used to finance Athens' city walls.

465—Operations in Northern Greece: Athens' powers and desire for expansion grow. In 465, after cleruchizing the Chersonese, they tried to gain control of Thasos. Thucydides wrote that Sparta contemplated an invasion of Attica in order to help free Thasos. However, in the aftermath of a catastrophic earthquake and subsequent helot uprising in Sparta, no attack—if indeed such was projected—was launched.

461—The Debate in Athens over Helping Sparta: With a legion of Helots rebelling against Sparta, Athens offered Sparta their help by sending a force of 4,000 Hoplites to suppress the rebels. According to Thucydides, Sparta decided to dismiss Cimon's Athenian Army, because they felt that Athens would convince the Helots on Ithome to form a coalition and besiege Sparta. Spartans did not feel comfortable with such a large Athenian force inside their city. If the Athenians were to turn their backs on Sparta, the city would not be able to protect itself. At this point, Sparta acknowledged that Athens might be getting too powerful. According to Thucydides, the Athenians were deeply offended by their removal from Ithome. They denounced their original treaty with Sparta made during the Greco-Persian Wars, then proceeded to make an alliance with Argos, a major enemy of the Spartans.

460—Athens' Clash with Corinth over Megara: Megarians joined the Delian League due to a war between Megara and Corinth. This angered the Corinthians. Even using Athens' weakest soldiers, being the old and young men who were left behind in the city, they were able to win the war against Corinth with ease.

460—The Athenian Expedition to Egypt: Athens led a coalition with the Egyptians to rebel against Persia. However, their six-year expedition did not lead to much success against Persia, as 100 Athenian ships were destroyed in the Delta region.

458—The Long Walls: The construction of the long walls gave Athens a major military advantage by forming a barrier around the city-state and its harbors, which allowed their ships to access waterways without threat from outside forces. Two walls were constructed from the city to the sea, one to Phaleron and the other to Piraeus. Athens relied on these long walls to protect itself from invasion, while sending off its superior vessels to bombard opponents' cities.

458—The Battle of Tanagra: According to Thucydides, the Spartans, motivated by ethnic solidarity, sent out 1500 Hoplites and an additional 10,000 from their allies' forces to suppress the Phocians' army invading Doris. The Spartans were victorious, but they found themselves stuck in this foreign land. Athens, suspecting a plot by the Spartans to overthrow the democracy and to prevent the building of the Long Walls, then attacked the Spartans at Tanagra in Boeotia with a force of 14,000. The Spartans were victorious in this battle.

457—The Battle of Oenophyta: After the Spartans returned home from Tanagra, the Athenians conquered Boetia and Phocis after a battle at Oenophyta. They then proceeded to tear down Tanagra's fortifications.

450—The Peace of Callias—Although this peace treaty is subject to scholarly debate, allegedly Athens and Persia agreed to a ceasefire.

447—Athens' forces were defeated at Coronea, causing the Athenian army to flee Boeotia.

446—The Peloponnesian Invasion of Attica: Athens continued their indirect war with Sparta by attempting to gain control of Delphi. City-states such as Megara and Euboea began to rebel against Athens and the Delian League when the Spartan Army invaded Athenian territory.

445—The Thirty-Year Peace Between Athens and Sparta: After losing Attica, Boeotia and Megara, Athens agreed to a thirty-year peace in return for all the conquered areas in the Peloponnesian region. From this point on, all future conflicts between Athens and Sparta were resolved under arbitration.

447—Athenian Colonization and the Colony of Brea: With the 30-year peace treaty, Athens was able to concentrate attention towards growth rather than war. From 447 to 445, the Delian League was able to influence city-states near the Mediterranean to join and pay tribute (phoro). This helped the region because the tributes paid by each city-state were reduced with the increasing number of members joining the league.

441—The Samian Revolt: Athens decided to besiege Samos after their revolt in 441. However, Persia decided to take the opportunity to support Samos even though they have signed the Peace of Callias with Athens. Athens would eventually spend 1200 talents to fund the war through the Delian League's treasury. Some scholars believed that Sparta might have aided Samos as well, but decided to pull out, having signed the Thirty-year peace treaty.

437—The Foundation of Amphipolis: With vast resources, especially timber for ship building, Athens founded the city of Amphipolis on the Strymon River. Amphipolis was immensely important to Athens since it controlled many trading routes.

432—The Potidaean Affair: Athens was threatened by the possibility of a revolt at Potidaea, plotted by Corinth and Macedon. After fighting in Macedon, which ended when the two countries came to terms with each other, Athens came to Potidaea. They had previously demanded that Potidaea tear down their long walls and banish Corinth ambassadors. However, by the time Athens reached Potidaea, the residents were in full revolt and prepared to fight Athens with support from the Corinthian army. The Corinthians was also able to influence the Spartans to join the cause, since Sparta didn't want to lose such an affluent ally. The fighting concluded with an Athenian victory.

432—The Megarian Decree: With Sparta's aid, Megara urged Athens to drop their decree against them since it was hurting their economy; they were forbidden to use Athens' markets and harbors. Athens claimed that Megarians insulted them by trespassing on land sacred to Demeter and murdering an Athenian ambassador. However, most scholars believe it was an act of vengeance when Megara revolted during the early parts of the Pentecontaetia.

432—Peloponnesian War—This marked the end of the Pentecontaetia, as Athens and Sparta engaged in all-out war, which eventually led to the demise of the Athenian Empire.

=== Democracy in Athens during the Pentecontaetia ===
After the exile of Cimon in Athens, his rivals Ephialtes and Pericles implemented democratic social reforms. In 462, Ephialtes challenged the Areopagus, claiming that they were abusing their powers. Part of the reform was to introduce "graphe paranomon" or public protest against illegal decrees. Any citizen would have the right to challenge a previous decree instilled by the Areopagus and claim it as invalid. The assembly would have to conduct a "dokimasia" or examination of state officials before they enter office. Opportunities for citizens to join the office were increased tremendously when 500 members were added. Transferring the powers of the Areopagus to all Athenian citizens enabled a more democratic society.

These democratic ideals are reflected in the use of personal names without a patronymic on inscriptions of casualty lists from around this time, such as those of the tribe Erechtheis dated to 460/459BC and the Argive dead at the Battle of Tanagra (457 BC). Without the patronymic or demotic it would have been impossible to identify the particular individual being referred to when multiplicity of the same name occurred, thus both reducing the impact of the long list and ensuring that individuals are deprived of their social context.

After Ephialtes death, his younger partner Pericles continued with reforms, transforming Athens into the most democratic city-state of Ancient Greece. During 450, he implemented a state salary of two obols per day for jurors to increase public participation from citizens. However, this system caused an outrage from the elites, claiming that the poor were uneducated and incapable of governing.

=== Increasing tensions leading to war ===
Thucydides offers us a unique perspective to view the Peloponnesian War since he actually took part in the conflict. This first-hand experience allows a look into the mind of a person at the center of the ordeal. The conflict between Athens and Sparta is in Thucydides' eyes an inevitable confrontation of the two major powers. The beginning of this tension begins during the incipient stages of the Athenian empire following the defeat of Persia during a period called the "pentekontaetia". The pentekontaetia began in 479 and ended with the outbreak of war. With great confidence in their military abilities, perhaps a bit of instilled machoism, and the need for an anti-Persian alliance, Athens begins recruiting various Greek city-states into an alliance called the Delian League. The growth of Athenian power through the Delian League is centered on a growing navy, the rebuilding of the walls that protect the city from land-based attackers, and an aggressive push to extend their influence which included a few skirmishes with other powers. Thucydides writes about how this period of growth was an inevitable cause of war, "Their supremacy grew during the interval between the present war and the Persian wars, through their military and political actions recounted below against the barbarians, against their own allies in revolt, and against the Peloponnesians whom they encountered on various occasions." (1.97 [2])

Athenian naval supremacy was a great fear of Sparta and her allies. While the Spartans combat prowess was unmatched on land, when it came to the sea Athens was the clear victor. This split seemed to have already been accepted by the Spartans many years earlier, however the aggressiveness and effectiveness of Athenian naval warfare had yet to be fully realized. According to Thucydides following the defeat of Persia, Athens begins to reconstruct the long walls which connected the main city of Athens to the port of Piraeus around 478. “Spartan feeling was at that time very friendly towards Athens on account of the patriotism which she had displayed in the struggle with Mede. Still the defeat of their wishes could not but cause them secret annoyance.” (1.92 [1]) The Spartan annoyance stems partly from the long walls being a major deterrent to land based, non-siege tactics which the Spartans were particularly adept at, but also from the way in which the deal was brokered.

Thucydides writes of Themistocles, an envoy to Sparta, who in 479 changed the tide of history by hiding the facts regarding the construction of the walls around Athens and those of the Piraeus. In Themistocles' speech to the Spartan assembly Thucydides points out that at this point Athenian independence was highlighted. "Wherever they had deliberated with the Spartans, they had proved themselves to be in judgment second to none." (1.91 [5]) This is an important step because Themistocles articulates that Athens is an independent state with its own agenda that brushed over that of others. This is a very important point in the lead up to the Peloponnesian War because one man is credited with making the split. Themistocles through his cunningness asserts an independent and strong Athenian identity. He makes it clear after the walls have been secured (ensuring Athenian strength) that Athens is independent and is making self-interested decisions. Furthermore, Themistocles also predicts that the growth in Athenian power will be centered on the sea. "For he first ventured to tell them to stick to the sea and forthwith began to lay the foundations of the empire." (1.93 [5]) Thucydides credits Themistocles with the determining point in which Athens becomes an empire creating the divide between Sparta and Athens.
