= Battle of Coronea =

Battle of Choronea may refer to:

- Battle of Coronea (447 BC)
- Battle of Coronea (394 BC)
