= Papadopoulos S.A. =

Greek biscuit company

Biscuit and Food Products Manufacturing Company - E.J. PAPADOPOULOS S.A.
- Native name: Ε.Ι. Παπαδόπουλος Α.Ε.
- Romanized name: E.J. Papadopoulos S.A.
- Industry: Food
- Founded: 1922
- Headquarters: Athens, Greece
- Number of employees: 1200 (2019)
- Website: Papadopoulos Biscuits

Papadopoulos (Greek: Παπαδόπουλος) is a Greek food company mostly known for its biscuits. The company was founded in 1922 in Athens, and has its origins in 1916 Istanbul with Evangelos Papadopoulos and his family. Their motto (Ένας κόσμος γεύσης και φροντίδας) translates to 'A world of taste and care'.

The company has four factories (Athens, Thessaloniki, Volos and Oinofyta) and exports to 40 countries.
