= Chalcis Decree =

Oath taken at the end of the revolt within the Athenian Empire

The Chalcis Decree was an oath of loyalty that the people of the city of Chalcis on the island of Euboea were forced to swear after the failure of a revolt from the Athenian Empire in 446/5 BC. The decree is difficult to date but it followed the revolt of the cities of Euboea in 446. The islanders were angered by the increasingly harsh imperialism of Athens and attempted to take advantage of the defeat of Athens in the Battle of Coronea in neighbouring Boeotia (c. 447 BC) which resulted in the loss of the Athenian “land empire”. The revolt was crushed by the Athenians led by Pericles. Other cities on Euboea, such as Eretria, had decrees with exactly the same provisions passed. The decree is considered a point at which there was no longer any doubt of the imperial power held by Athens over its allies in the Delian League.

I will not revolt from the people of Athens by any means or device whatsoever, neither in word or in deed, nor will I obey anyone who does revolt, and if anyone revolts I will denounce him to the Athenians. and I will be the best and fairest ally I am able to be and will help and defend the Athenian people, in the event of anyone wronging the Athenians people, and I will obey the Athenian people.

Athens also expected to be involved in the judicial proceedings of the city of Chalcis resulting in the actions of local courts being severely restricted. The decree allowed the people of Chalcis to punish their own citizens, except in cases that involved death, exile, or the loss of rights as citizens. The right of appeal to the Heliaia in Athens was allowed. This was largely aimed at the oligarchic wealthy who hoped to gain the assistance of Sparta or Persia in their revolts.
