= Oenophyta =

Ancient Greek town in Boeotia

Coordinates: 38°18′17″N 23°37′51″E

Oenophyta or Oinophyta (Ancient Greek: τὰ Οἰνόφυτα) was a town in ancient Boeotia. During the First Peloponnesian War, in the Battle of Oenophyta fought here in 457 BCE, the Athenians under Myronides gained a signal victory over the Boeotian League. As this victory was followed by the destruction of Tanagra, there can be little doubt that it was in the territory of the latter city, not far from the frontier of Attica. Its name, moreover, shows that it was the place where the wine was chiefly produced, for which the territory of Tanagra was celebrated.

Its site is located near modern Oinofyta (Staniates).
