= Oinofyta =

Village in Boeotia, Greece

Oinofyta Οινόφυτα
- Municipal unit
- Location within the regional unit

- Location within Greece
- Coordinates: 38°18′N 23°38′E
- Country: Greece
- Administrative region: Central Greece
- Regional unit: Boeotia
- Municipality: Tanagra
- Elevation: 61 m (200 ft)

Population (2021)
  - Municipal unit: 4,314
  - Community: 2,882
- Time zone: UTC+2 (EET)
  - Summer (DST): UTC+3 (EEST)
- Postal code: 320 11
- Area code: 22620
- Vehicle registration: ΒΙ

Oinofyta (Greek: Οινόφυτα) is a village and former municipality in eastern Boeotia, Greece. Following the local government reform of 2011, it is now part of the municipality of Tanagra, of which it is a municipal unit. It was formerly named Staniates (Στανιάτες) until 1927. Within the territory of the municipal unit lies the ancient town of Oenophyta, where the Battle of Oenophyta was fought in 457 BCE.

== Subdivisions ==
The municipal unit of Oinofyta is subdivided into the following communities:

- Agios Thomas
- Kleidi
- Oinofyta

In 2014 the village Dilesi was separated from the municipal unit of Oinofyta and made into a new municipal unit.

== Historical population ==
Year	Town population	Municipal unit population
1981	2,555	-
1991	3,697	-
2001	3,137	8,195
2011	2,927	6,563
2021	2,882	4,314

Oinofyta has historically been an Arvanite settlement.

== Pollution ==
In December 2007, official tests revealed that drinking water in Oinofyta was contaminated with high levels of the carcinogen hexavalent chromium, which is used as an anti-corrosive in the production of stainless steel, paint, ink, plastics and dyes. For decades, factories had been dumping waste in the Asopos River, whose waters run from red to black and ripple with bubbling sludge.

== People ==
Archbishop Ieronymos II was born in the settlement.

== Transport ==
The village is served by the Oinofyta railway station on the edge of the village with Proastiakos trains to Athens and Chalcis.

== Sport ==
- G.S. Oinophyta Olympiad, football
- G.S. Oinophyton, basketball

== Election results ==
Election	Turnout	ND	PASOK	SYRIZA	KKE	Other
Jun 2023	59.04	46.34	11.71	14.09	4.80	23.06 (Note: Spartiates 7.64 EL 4.75 PE 3.51 Niki 2.99 Μ25 1.34 Other 2.83)
May 2023	70.62	46.37	10.38	16.85	6.20	20.20 (Note: EL 4.80 PE 3.34 Niki 2.73 Μ25 1.85 Enono 1.06 K21 1.01 Other 5.41)
2019	65.26	40.48	6.96	29.79	5.00	17.77 (Note: XA 6.68 EL 4.01 Μ25 2.61 PE 1.73 Other 2.74)
Sep 2015	64.86	23.42	4.34	36.88	5.58	29.78 (Note: XA 14.62 ANEL 3.96 Potami 3.11 LAE 2.93 EK 2.79 Other 2.37)
Jan 2015	76.25	22.15	6.39	37.22	5.46	28.78 (Note: XA 12.90 ANEL 5.15 Potami 4.04 Teleia 2.47 KIDISO 1.18 Other 3.04)
Jun 2012	74.35	22.31	8.58	27.76	4.28	37.07 (Note: XA 16.14 ANEL 10.66 DIMAR 5.60 LAOS 1.17 Other 3.50)
May 2012	76.62	13.01	9.49	17.20	8.39	51.91 (Note: XA 17.29 ANEL 14.34 DIMAR 5.50 OP 2.48 LAOS 2.42 DISY 1.80 KDP 1.42 ANTARSYA 1.36 DIXA 1.06 Drassi 1.03 Other 3.21)
2009	82.96	33.58	45.03	2.60	7.15	11.64 (Note: LAOS 6.05 OP 2.08 XA 1.12 Other 2.39)
2007	87.55	43.31	38.55	2.78	8.87	6.49 (Note: LAOS 4.17 Other 2.32)
2004	91.50	49.11	39.52	1.73	4.78	4.86 (Note: LAOS 2.14 DIKKI 1.73 Other 0.99)
2000	84.98	48.32	42.36	2.09 (Note: as Syn)	3.80	3.43 (Note: DIKKI 1.84 Other 1.59)
1996	83.96	44.47	39.39	3.35	2.36	10.43 (Note: POLAN 3.90 DIKKI 3.86 Other 2.67)
1993	87.14	44.41	44.20	1.29	2.33	7.77 (Note: POLAN 7.19 Other 0.58)
1990	88.35	55.42	36.96	5.60		2.02

== See also ==
- List of settlements in Boeotia
