= Nicomedes of Sparta =

Spartan regent for king Pleistoanax, fl. 460–457 BC

Nicomedes
- Born: Sparta
- House: Agiad
- Father: Cleombrotus

Nicomedes (Ancient Greek: Νικομήδης; fl. 460 – 457 BC) was a Spartan military commander and a scion of the royal Agiad dynasty. He was a regent of Sparta during the minority of Pleistoanax, the son of his brother Pausanias.

== Biography ==
Nicomedes was the son of Cleombrotus (died 479 BC), who was appointed regent of Sparta after the death of his brother King Leonidas (reigned 489–480 BC) at the Battle of Thermopylae. During this time, Leonidas' son Pleistarchus (reigned 480–458 BC) was not yet of age to rule. When Cleombrotus died, he was succeeded by his son Pausanias (died 477 BC). Pausanias was starved to death by the Spartans on suspicion of treachery. Pleistarchus was succeeded by Pausanias' son Pleistoanax (reigned 458–409 BC). He too was a minor when he became king, and Nicomedes was appointed regent.

The First Peloponnesian War, between Sparta and its allies (including Thebes; the Peloponnesian League) and Athens and its allies (including Argos; the Delian League), had broken out in 460 BC. When the Phocians attacked the Doris, which was considered the homeland of the Dorians of Sparta, the Spartans retaliated. Nicomedes was given command of this campaign, in place of the king. The army, which consisted of 1,500 Spartan and 10,000 allied hoplites, was sent north. He drove the Phocians out and forced them to agree to his peace terms.

Nicomedes then decided to head to the Peloponnese. His dilemma was that the shortest route, by sea across the Gulf of Corinth, was sure to be patrolled by the Athenian fleet, whereas the land route was through difficult terrain with key points controlled by the Athenians and their allies. He therefore decided to remain in Boeotia, of which Thebes was the chief city. The Athenians saw an opportunity, and in 457 BC assembled an army of 14,000 men, including 1,000 Argives and contingents from their other allies, and marched north to engage their enemy. The two forces met at Tanagra, 20 km (12 mi) east of Thebes. After heavy fighting, the Peloponnesians were victorious. They took the opportunity to return home by the land route across the Isthmus of Corinth, cutting down the fruit trees as they went. Nicomedes thereafter disappears from history.
