= Second Sacred War =

Spartan–Phocian conflict at Delphi (440s BC)

- Part of the First Peloponnesian War
Date	440s BC
Location	Temple of Apollo at Delphi
Result	Brief Spartan-installed Delphian rule

Belligerents
Sparta; Delphi	Phocis

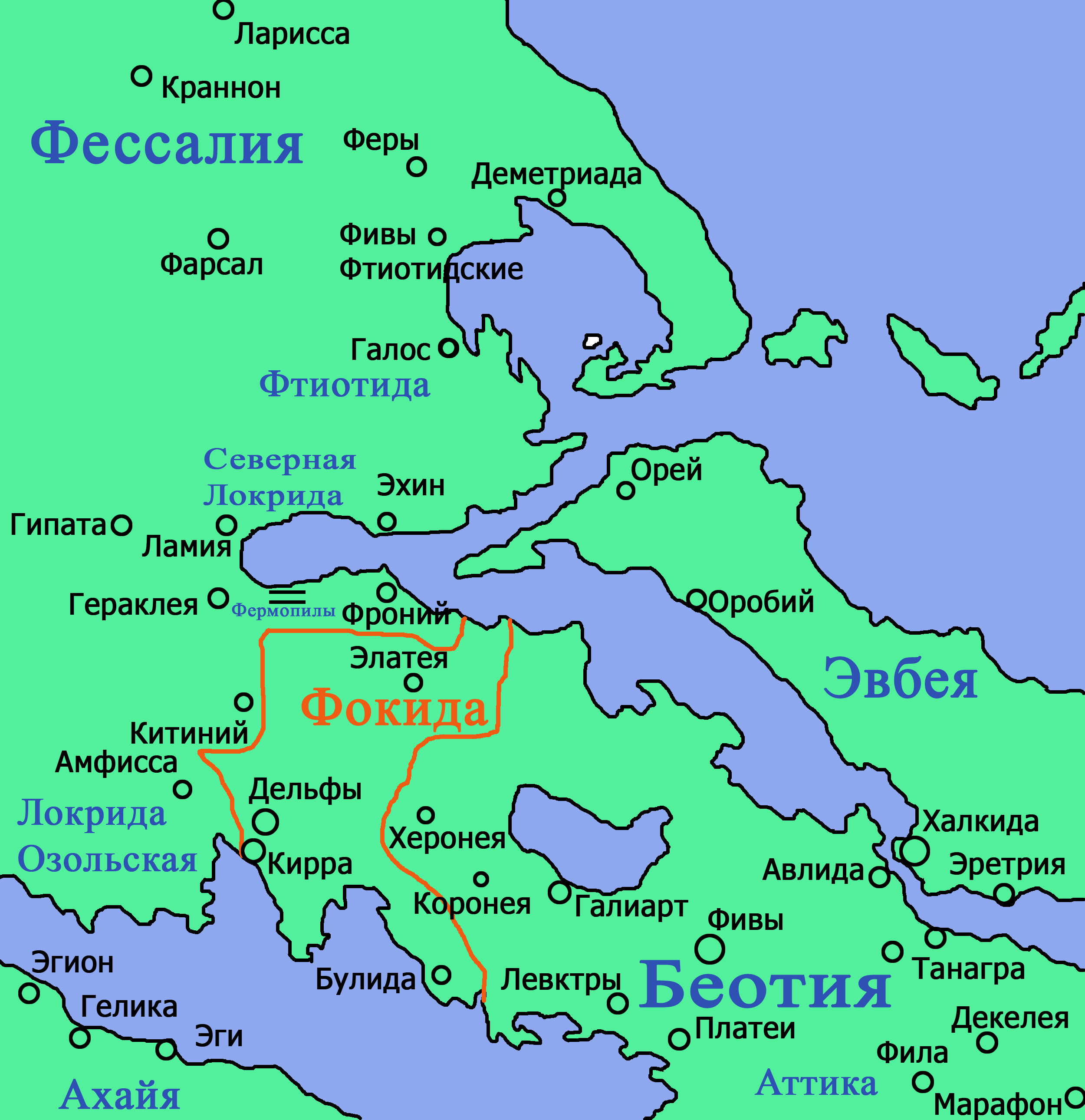
Location of the Phocian League

The Second Sacred War was the Spartan defeat of the Phocians at Delphi and the restoration of Delphian self-government.

== Background ==
In 458 or 457 BC, the Phocians captured three towns in the Spartan metropolis of Doris. A Spartan army marched on Doris, defeated the Phocians, and restored Dorian rule. On their way back to the Peloponnese, an Athenian force attacked the Spartan army but were repelled, and the Spartans returned home. After the Five Years' Truce, Sparta embarked on a campaign of truncating "Athens' imperialistic ambitions in Central Greece".

== Conflict ==
The Second Sacred War (Ancient Greek: ἱερὸς πόλεμος) was a conflict over the occupation of the Temple of Apollo at Delphi. The Spartans quickly removed the Athenian-backed Phocians and returned stewardship to the Delphians. After the Spartans left, however, an Athenian army led by Pericles took the city and re-installed Phocian rule.

Accepting the writings of the Greek historian Philochorus, a group of historians led by Karl Julius Beloch, Benjamin Dean Meritt, Theodore Wade-Gery and Malcolm Francis McGregor argued that the Spartan ejection of the Phocians occurred in 449 BC, and that the Athenians re-installed them in 447 BC. An alternative view was put forward by historians led by Arnold Wycombe Gomme and Felix Jacoby who rejected Philochorus' chronology. Instead, they asserted that both marches on Delphi happened in 448 BC.

== Impact ==
As of 1997, there was no extant evidence that these changes in Delphian governance had any effect on pilgrims to the Pythia. This Sacred War and Third Sacred War (356–346 BC) were the only two to be referred to as such in classical antiquity.
