= Tolmides =

Athenian general during the First Peloponnesian War

Tolmides, (Greek: Τολμίδης), son of Tolmaeus, was a leading Athenian general of the First Peloponnesian War. He rivalled Pericles and Myronides for the military leadership of Athens during the 450s and early 440s BC.

In 455 BC, Tolmides was given command of a fleet and a force of 4,000 soldiers in order to sail round the coasts of the Peloponnesus attacking the Spartans and their allies. Tolmides seized the city of Methone in Messenia but was then forced to abandon it due to the arrival of a Spartan force. He attacked the chief Spartan port of Gytheion and burnt the dockyards. He also attacked the island of Cythera.

Tolmides made an alliance with Zacynthus, an island in the Ionian Sea, and sailing into the Gulf of Corinth he took the Corinthian colony of Chalcis on the northern coast of the gulf and then seized Naupactus in Ozolian Locris and settled refugees from Messenia there who would act as Athenian allies in a strategic location. He also landed in the territory of Sicyon and defeated a force of hoplites sent against him.

Later, Tolmides settled Athenian cleruchs in Euboea and at Naxos. In 447 BC, he marched into Boeotia with 1,000 Athenians and some allied troops to put down an uprising against Athenian rule. After garrisoning Chaeronea he encountered a force of Boeotian, Locrian and Euboean exiles at Coronea and the Athenians suffered a heavy defeat with Tolmides dying in the battle.

The Athenian defeat at the First Battle of Coronea heralded the end of the ‘Athenian Land Empire’.
