= Kekryphaleia =

Small island in the Saronic Gulf

Kekryphaleia or Kekryphalia or Cecryphalia or Cecryphaleia (Ancient Greek: Κεκρυφάλεια) was a small island in the Saronic Gulf between Aegina and the coast of Epidaurus, known from ancient sources as the site of a naval engagement in the First Peloponnesian War. Pliny the Elder calls it Cecryphalos and writes that it lay opposite Epidaurus, six miles distant from the mainland. Its precise identification remains uncertain; however, it has been associated with the islets of Kyra and Spalathronisi, as well as with the island of Angistri, although Pliny clearly distinguishes Pityonesos (Angistri) from Cecryphalos. Stephanus of Byzantium is the only source to describe it as a promontory (of Aegina/Argolis).

According to Thucydides, Diodorus Siculus and Aelius Aristides, after fighting at Halieis, the Athenians again defeated the Peloponnesians near Kekryphaleia. This was followed by further Athenian successes, including a naval victory over Aegina.
