= Delian League =

Association of ancient Greek city-states under Athenian hegemony

- 478 BC–404 BC
- Ancient Athens and Delian League (yellow) shown along the Peloponnesian League and the Persian Empire at the outset of the Peloponnesian War around 431 BC.
- Capital: Athens
- Common languages: Ancient Greek
- Religion: Ancient Greek religion
- Government: Hegemonic confederacy, military alliance
- Legislature: Ecclesia of Athens
- History
  - Established: 478 BC
  - Disestablished: 404 BC
Preceded by	Succeeded by
Hellenic alliance (480-478 BC)	Spartan hegemony

The Delian League was a confederacy of Greek city-states, numbering between 150 and 330, founded in 478 BC under the hegemony of Athens, whose purpose was to continue fighting the Persian Empire after the Greek victory in the Battle of Plataea at the end of the Second Persian invasion of Greece. The League functioned as a dual—offensive and defensive—alliance (symmachia) of autonomous states, similar to its rival association, the Peloponnesian League led by Sparta. The League's modern name derives from its official meeting place, the island of Delos, where congresses were held within the sanctuary of the Temple of Apollo; contemporary authors referred to the organization simply as "the Athenians and their Allies".

While Sparta excelled as Greece's greatest power on land, Athens turned to the seas, becoming the dominant naval power of the Greek world. Following Sparta's withdrawal from the conflict with Persia, Athens took the lead of the Hellenic alliance accompanied by several states around the Aegean and the Anatolian coast. The Delian League was formed as an anti-Persian defensive association of equal city-states seeking protection under Athens, as the latter wished to extend its support towards the Ionian Greek colonies of Anatolia. The alliance held an assembly of representatives in order to shape its policy, while members swore an oath of loyalty to the coalition. By the mid-fifth century BC, it had developed into a naval imperial power, conventionally called the Athenian Empire, where Athens established complete dominion and the allies became increasingly less autonomous. The League led by Cimon, successfully accomplished its principal strategic goal by decisively expelling the remaining Persian forces from the Aegean. As a result, Persia would cease to pose a major threat to Greece for the following fifty years.

From its inception, Athens became the League's biggest source of military power, while more and more allies preferred to pay their dues in cash. Athens began to use the League's funds for its own purposes, like the reinforcement of its naval supremacy, which led to conflicts with the less powerful allies, at times culminating in rebellions, like that of Thasos in 465 BC. The League's treasury initially stood in Delos until, in a symbolic gesture, Pericles moved it to Athens in 454 BC. By 431 BC, the threat that the League presented to Spartan hegemony, combined with Athens's heavy-handed administration, prompted the outbreak of the Peloponnesian War; the League was dissolved upon the war's conclusion in 404 BC under the direction of Lysander. Witnessing Sparta's growing hegemony in the first half of the 4th century BC, Athens went on to partly revive the alliance, this time called the Second Athenian League, reestablishing its naval dominance in the eastern Mediterranean.

== Background ==
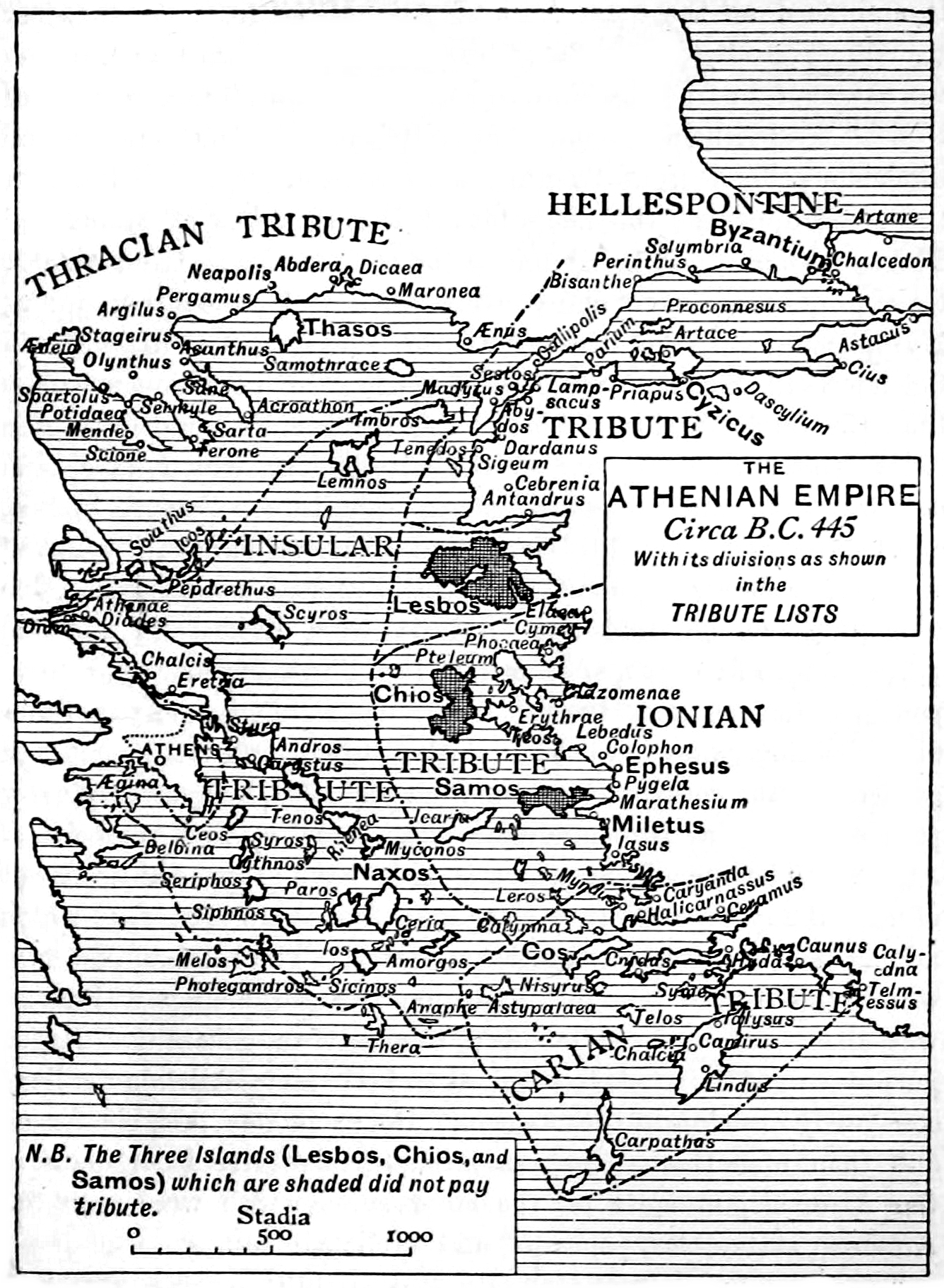
Athenian Empire in 445 BC, according to the Tribute Lists. The islands of Lesbos, Chios and Samos (shaded on the map) did not pay tribute.

The Greco-Persian Wars had their roots in the conquest of the Greek cities of Asia Minor, and particularly Ionia, by the Achaemenid Persian Empire of Cyrus the Great shortly after 550 BC. The Persians found the Ionians difficult to rule, eventually settling for sponsoring a tyrant in each Ionian city. While Greek states had in the past often been ruled by tyrants, this form of government was on the decline. By 500 BC, Ionia appears to have been ripe for rebellion against these Persian clients. The simmering tension finally broke into open revolt due to the actions of the tyrant of Miletus, Aristagoras. Attempting to save himself after a disastrous Persian-sponsored expedition in 499 BC, Aristagoras chose to declare Miletus a democracy. This triggered similar revolutions across Ionia, extending to Doris and Aeolis, beginning the Ionian Revolt.

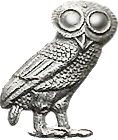
Owl of Athena, patron of Athens

The Greek states of Athens and Eretria allowed themselves to be drawn into this conflict by Aristagoras, and during their only campaigning season (498 BC) they contributed to the capture and burning of the Persian regional capital of Sardis. After this, the Ionian revolt carried on (without further outside aid) for five more years, until it was finally crushed by the Persians. However, in a decision of great historic significance, the Persian king Darius the Great decided that, despite having subdued the revolt, there remained the unfinished business of exacting punishment on Athens and Eretria for supporting the revolt. The Ionian revolt had severely threatened the stability of Darius's empire, and the states of mainland Greece would continue to threaten that stability unless dealt with. Darius thus began to contemplate the complete conquest of Greece, beginning with the destruction of Athens and Eretria.

In the next two decades, there would be two Persian invasions of Greece, occasioning, thanks to Greek historians, some of the most famous battles in history. During the first invasion, Thrace, Macedon and the Aegean Islands were added to the Persian Empire, and Eretria was destroyed. However, the invasion ended in 490 BC with the decisive Athenian victory at the Battle of Marathon. After this invasion, Darius died, and responsibility for the war passed to his son Xerxes I.

Xerxes then personally led a second Persian invasion of Greece in 480 BC, taking an enormous (although oft-exaggerated) army and navy to Greece. Those Greeks who chose to resist (the 'Allies') were defeated in the twin simultaneous battles of Thermopylae on land and Artemisium at sea. All of Greece except the Peloponnesus thus having fallen into Persian hands, the Persians then sought to destroy the Allied navy once and for all but suffered a decisive defeat at the Battle of Salamis. The following year, 479 BC, the Allies assembled the largest Greek army yet seen and defeated the Persian invasion force at the Battle of Plataea, ending the invasion and the threat to Greece.

The Allied fleet defeated the remnants of the Persian fleet in the Battle of Mycale near the island of Samos—on the same day as Plataea, according to tradition. This action marks the end of the Persian invasion, and the beginning of the next phase in the Greco-Persian wars, the Greek counterattack. After Mycale, the Greek cities of Asia Minor again revolted, with the Persians now powerless to stop them. The Allied fleet then sailed to the Thracian Chersonese, still held by the Persians, and besieged and captured the town of Sestos. The following year, 478 BC, the Allies sent a force to capture the city of Byzantion (modern-day Istanbul). The siege was successful, but the behaviour of the Spartan general Pausanias alienated many of the Allies, and resulted in Pausanias's recall.

== Formation ==
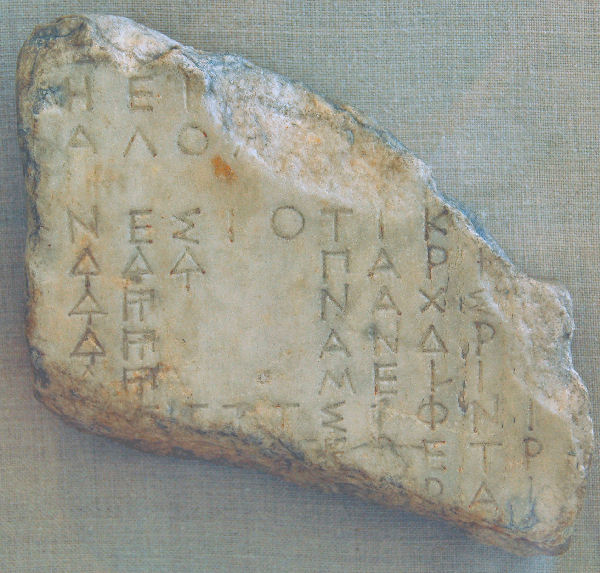
Fragment of the Athenian Tribute List, 425–424 BC.

After Byzantion, Sparta was eager to end its involvement in the war. The Spartans greatly feared the rise of the Athenians as a challenge to their power. Additionally, the Spartans were of the view that, with the liberation of mainland Greece and the Greek cities of Asia Minor, the war's purpose had already been achieved. There was also perhaps a feeling that establishing long-term security for the Asian Greeks would prove impossible. In the aftermath of Mycale, the Spartan king Leotychidas had proposed transplanting all the Greeks from Asia Minor to Europe as the only method of permanently freeing them from Persian dominion.

Xanthippus, the Athenian commander at Mycale, had furiously rejected this; the Ionian cities had been Athenian colonies, and the Athenians, if no one else, would protect the Ionians. This marked the point at which the leadership of the Greek alliance effectively passed to the Athenians. With the Spartan withdrawal after Byzantion, the leadership of the Athenians became explicit.

The loose alliance of city states which had fought against Xerxes's invasion had been dominated by Sparta and the Peloponnesian league. With the withdrawal of these states, a congress was called on the holy island of Delos to institute a new alliance to continue the fight against the Persians; hence the modern designation "Delian League". According to Thucydides, the official aim of the League was to "avenge the wrongs they suffered by ravaging the territory of the king."

In reality, this goal was divided into three main efforts—to prepare for future invasion, to seek revenge against Persia, and to organize a means of dividing spoils of war. The members were given a choice of either offering armed forces or paying a tax to the joint treasury; most states chose the tax. League members swore to have the same friends and enemies, and dropped ingots of iron into the sea to symbolize the permanence of their alliance. The Athenian politician Aristides would spend the rest of his life occupied in the affairs of the alliance, dying (according to Plutarch) a few years later in Pontus, whilst determining what the tax of new members was to be.

== Members ==
The Delian League, also known as the Athenian Empire, was a collection of Greek city-states largely based around the Aegean Sea which operated under the hegemony of Athens. This alliance initially served the purpose of coordinating a united Greek front against a perceived looming Persian threat against the Ionian city-states which bordered it. The members of the Delian League were made to swear an oath of loyalty to the league and contributed mostly monetarily but in some instances donated ships or other forces. It was also the case that many democratic members of the League owed their freedom from oligarchic or tyrannical rule to Athens. Because of this, Athens gained an overwhelming advantage in the voting system conducted by relying on the support of democratic city-states Athens had helped into being. By 454 Athens moved the treasury of the Delian League from the Island of Delos to the Parthenon in Athens. Benefitting greatly from the influx of cash coming out of the 150-330 members, Athens used the money to reinforce its own naval supremacy and used the remaining funds to embellish the city with art and architecture. In order to maintain the new synoecism, Athens began using its greatly expanded military to enforce membership in the League. City-states who wished to leave the alliance were punished by Athens with force such as Mytilene and Melos. No longer considered her allies, Athens eventually began to refer to the members of the Delian League as "all the cities Athens rules." Athens also extended its authority over members of the League through judicial decisions. Synoecism under the Athenian Empire was enforced by resolving matters of and between states in Athens by courts composed of Athenian citizens and enforcing those decisions through the Athenian military.

== Composition and expansion ==
In the first ten years of the league's existence, Cimon/Kimon forced Karystos in Euboea to join the league, conquered the island of Skyros and sent Athenian colonists there.

Over time, especially with the suppression of rebellions, Athens exercised hegemony over the rest of the league. Thucydides describes how Athens's control over the League grew:

Of all the causes of defection, that connected with arrears of tribute and vessels, and with failure of service, was the chief; for the Athenians were very severe and exacting, and made themselves offensive by applying the screw of necessity to men who were not used to and in fact not disposed for any continuous labor. In some other respects the Athenians were not the old popular rulers they had been at first; and if they had more than their fair share of service, it was correspondingly easy for them to reduce any that tried to leave the confederacy. The Athenians also arranged for the other members of the league to pay its share of the expense in money instead of in ships and men, and for this the subject city-states had themselves to blame, their wish to get out of giving service making most leave their homes. Thus while Athens was increasing her navy with the funds they contributed, a revolt always found itself without enough resources or experienced leaders for war.

== Rebellion ==
=== Naxos ===
The first member of the league to attempt to secede was the island of Naxos in c. 471 BC. After being defeated, Naxos is believed (based on similar, later revolts) to have been forced to tear down its walls along with losing its fleet and vote in the League.

=== Thasos ===
In 465 BC, Athens founded the colony of Amphipolis on the Strymon river. Thasos, a member of the League, saw her interests in the mines of Mt. Pangaion threatened and defected from the League to Persia. She called to Sparta for assistance but was denied, as Sparta was facing the largest helot revolt in its history.

After more than two years of siege, Thasos surrendered to the Athenian leader Aristides and was forced back into the league. As a result, the fortification walls of Thasos were torn down, and they had to pay yearly tribute and fines. Additionally, their land, naval ships, and the mines of Thasos were confiscated by Athens. The siege of Thasos marks the transformation of the Delian league from an alliance into, in the words of Thucydides, a hegemony.

== Policies of the League ==
In 461 BC, Cimon was ostracized and was succeeded in his influence by democrats such as Ephialtes and Pericles. This signaled a complete change in Athenian foreign policy, neglecting the alliance with the Spartans and instead allying with her enemies, Argos and Thessaly. Megara deserted the Spartan-led Peloponnesian League and allied herself with Athens, allowing construction of a double line of walls across the Isthmus of Corinth and protecting Athens from attack from that quarter. Roughly a decade earlier, due to encouragement from influential speaker Themistocles, the Athenians had also constructed the Long Walls connecting their city to the Piraeus, its port, making it effectively invulnerable to attack by land.

In 454 BC, the Athenian general Pericles moved the Delian League's treasury from Delos to Athens, allegedly to keep it safe from Persia. However, Plutarch indicates that many of Pericles's rivals viewed the transfer to Athens as usurping monetary resources to fund elaborate building projects. Athens also switched from accepting ships, men and weapons as dues from league members, to only accepting money.

The new treasury established in Athens was used for many purposes, not all relating to the defence of members of the league. It was from tribute paid to the league that Pericles set to building the Parthenon on the Acropolis, replacing an older temple, as well as many other non-defense related expenditures. The Delian League was turning from an alliance into an empire.

== Wars against Persia in Egypt and Cyprus ==
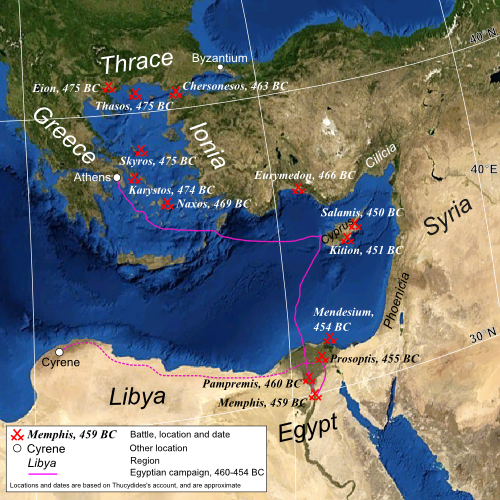
Map showing the locations of battles fought by the Delian League, 477–449 BC.

War with the Persians continued. In 460 BC, Egypt revolted under local leaders Inaros and Amyrtaeus, as called by the Hellenes, who requested aid from Athens. Pericles led 250 ships, intended to attack Cyprus, to their aid because it would further damage Persia. After four years, however, the Egyptian rebellion was defeated by the Achaemenid general Megabyzus, who captured the greater part of the Athenian forces. In fact, according to Isocrates, the Athenians and their allies lost some 20,000 men in the expedition, while modern estimates place the figure at 50,000 men and 250 ships including reinforcements. The remainder escaped to Cyrene and thence returned home.

This was the Athenians' main (public) reason for moving the treasury of the League from Delos to Athens, further consolidating their control over the League. The Persians followed up their victory by sending a fleet to re-establish their control over Cyprus, and 200 ships were sent out to counter them under Cimon, who returned from ostracism in 451 BC. He died during the blockade of Citium, though the fleet won a double victory by land and sea over the Persians off Salamis, Cyprus.

This battle was the last major one fought against the Persians. Many writers report that a peace treaty, known as the Peace of Callias, was formalized in 450 BC, but some writers believe that the treaty was a myth created later to inflate the stature of Athens. However, an understanding was definitely reached, enabling the Athenians to focus their attention on events in Greece.

== Wars for hegemony in Greece ==
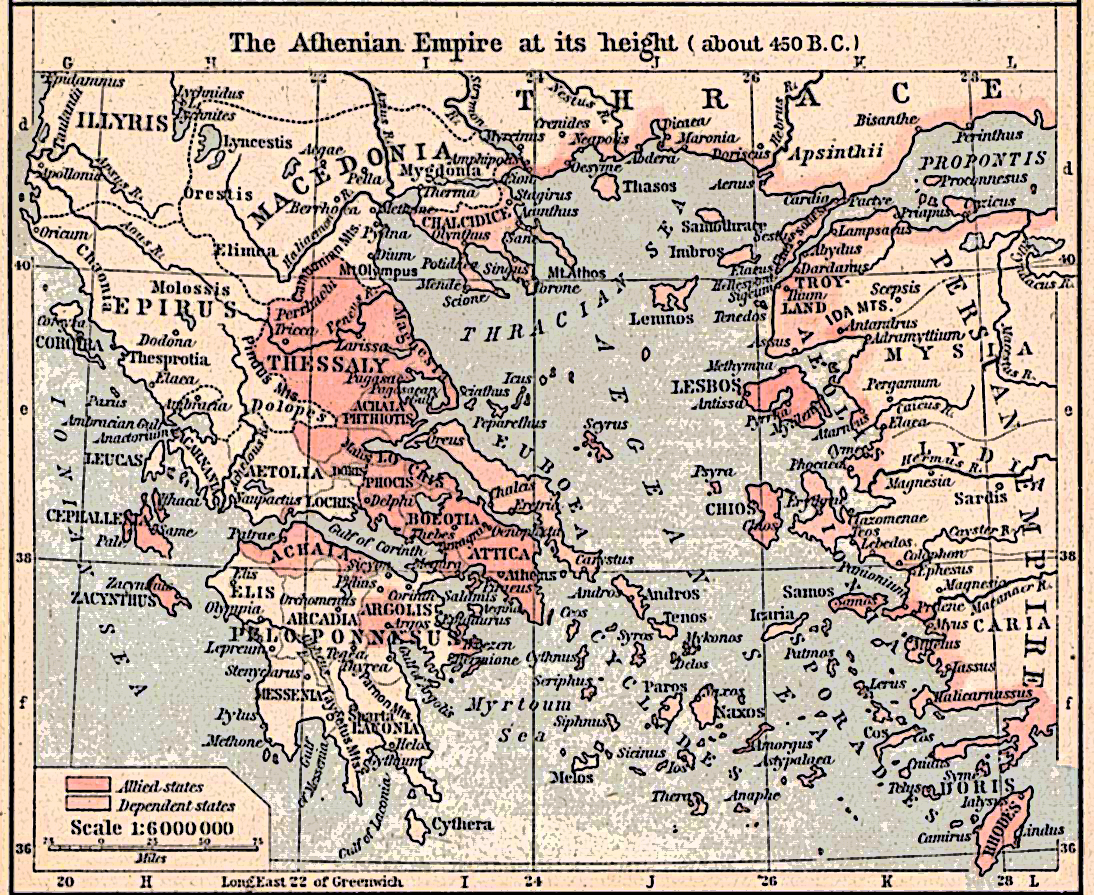
The Athenian Empire at its height, c. 450 BC.

=== First Peloponnesian War ===
Soon, war with the Peloponnesians broke out. In 458 BC, the Athenians blockaded the island of Aegina, and simultaneously defended Megara from the Corinthians by sending out an army composed of those too young or old for regular military service. The following year, Sparta sent an army into Boeotia, reviving the power of Thebes in order to help hold the Athenians in check. Their return was blocked, and they resolved to march on Athens, where the Long Walls were not yet completed, winning a victory at the Battle of Tanagra. All this accomplished, however, was to allow them to return home via the Megarid. Two months later, the Athenians under Myronides invaded Boeotia, and winning the Battle of Oenophyta gained control of the whole country except Thebes.

Reverses followed peace with Persia in 449 BC. The Battle of Coronea, in 447 BC, led to the abandonment of Boeotia. Euboea and Megara revolted, and while the former was restored to its status as a tributary ally, the latter was a permanent loss. The Delian and Peloponnesian Leagues signed a peace treaty, which was set to endure for thirty years. It only lasted until 431 BC, when the Peloponnesian War broke out.

=== Revolts and moving the Treasury from Delos to Athens ===
Those who revolted unsuccessfully during the war saw the example made of the Mytilenians, the principal people on Lesbos. After an unsuccessful revolt, the Athenians ordered the death of the entire male population. After some thought, they rescinded this order, and only put to death the leading 1000 ringleaders of the revolt, and redistributed the land of the entire island to Athenian shareholders, who were sent out to reside on Lesbos.

By 454 BC, the Delian League could be fairly characterised as an Athenian Empire; a key event of 454 BC was the moving of the treasury of the Delian League from Delos to Athens. This era is often seen as a key marker of the transition from alliance to empire, but while it is significant, it is important to view the period as a whole when considering the development of Athenian imperialism, and not to focus on a single event as being the main contributor to it. To further strengthen Athens's grip on its empire, Pericles in 450 BC began a policy of establishing kleruchiai—quasi-colonies that remained tied to Athens and which served as garrisons to maintain control of the League's vast territory. Furthermore, Pericles employed a number of offices to maintain Athens' empire: proxenoi, who fostered good relations between Athens and League members; episkopoi and archontes, who oversaw the collection of tribute; and hellenotamiai, who received the tribute on Athens' behalf.

=== Peloponnesian War (431-404 BC) ===
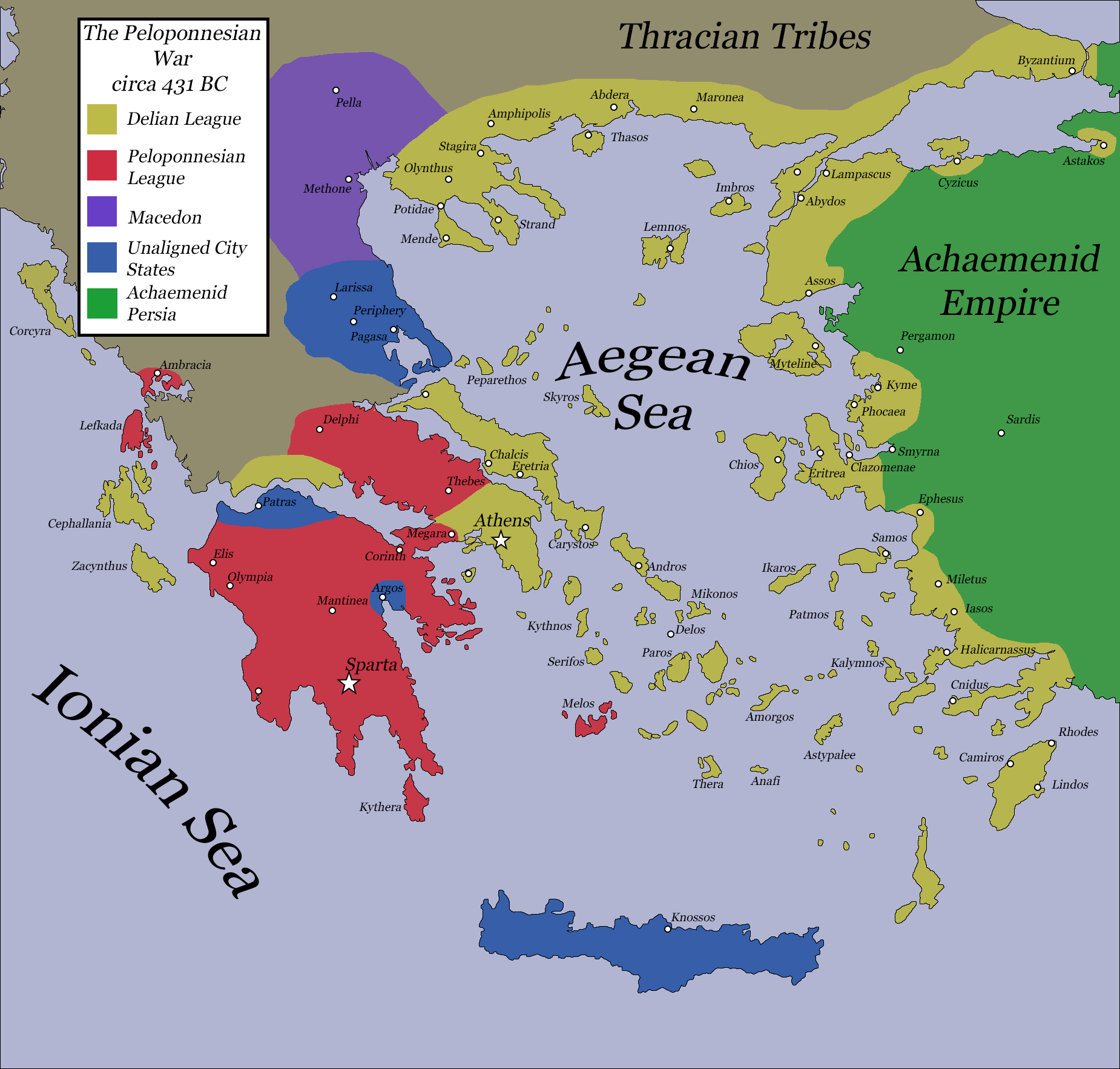
Greece at the beginning of the Peloponnesian War

At the start of the Peloponnesian War, only Chios and Lesbos were left to contribute ships, and these states were by now far too weak to secede without support. Lesbos tried to revolt first, and failed completely. Chios, the most powerful of the original members of the Delian League save Athens, was the last to revolt, and in the aftermath of the Syracusan Expedition enjoyed success for several years, inspiring all of Ionia to revolt. Athens was nonetheless eventually able to suppress these revolts. Thucydides documents the example of Melos, a small island, neutral in the war, though founded by Spartans. The Melians were offered a choice to join the Athenians, or be conquered. Choosing to resist, their town was besieged and conquered; the males were put to death and the women sold into slavery (see Melian dialogue). The Athenian empire was not very stable and after 27 years of war, the Spartans, aided by the Persians and Athenian internal strife, were able to defeat it.

== Aftermath ==
However, Athens did not remain defeated for long. The Second Athenian League, a maritime self-defense league, was founded in 377 BC and was led by Athens against the Spartan and then Theban hegemony. The Athenians would never recover the full extent of their power, and their enemies were now far stronger and more varied.

== See also ==
- Athenian democracy
- Chalcis Decree
- Phormio
- Hellenic civilization
- Pentecontaetia
- Zone (colony)

== Sources ==
- Artz, James (2008). Natural Resources and 5th Century Athenian Foreign Policy: The Effect of Natural Resources on Fifth Century Athenian Foreign Policy and the Development of the Athenian Empire. Saarbrücken: VDM Verlag. ISBN 978-3-639-08667-6.
- Brand, Peter J. (2020). "Athens & Sparta: Democracy vs. Dictatorship" (PDF). University of the People. Archived (PDF) from the original on 2022-10-09.
- Engen, Darel Tai (2010). Honor and Profit: Athenian Trade Policy and the Economy and Society of Greece, 415-307 B.C.E. University of Michigan Press. ISBN 978-0-472-11634-8.
- Fine, John Van Antwerp (1983). The Ancient Greeks: A Critical History. Cambridge, MA: Harvard University Press. ISBN 0-674-03314-0.
- Fuller, John (1954–1957). A Military History of the Western World Volume I: From the Earliest Times to the Battle of Lepanto. New York: Funk and Wagnalls.
- Holland, Tom (2005). Persian Fire: The First World Empire and the Battle for the West. New York: Anchor Books. ISBN 978-0-307-38698-4.
- Keuls, Eva C. (1993) [1985]. The Reign of the Phallus: Sexual Politics in Ancient Athens. Berkeley: University of California Press. ISBN 978-0-520-07929-8.
- Lazenby, John Francis (1993). The Defence of Greece: 490–479 BC. Liverpool: Liverpool University Press. ISBN 978-0-856-68591-0.
- Luttenberger, Mark (2017). From Darius I to Philip II, The Story of the Greek Poleis. Page Publishing, Incorporated. ISBN 9781640826816.
- Martin, Thomas R. (2000) [1996]. Ancient Greece: From Prehistoric to Hellenistic Times. New Haven and London: Yale University Press. ISBN 978-0-300-08493-1.
- Nelson, Eric D.; Allard-Nelson, Susan K. (2005). The Complete Idiot's Guide to Ancient Greece. Indianapolis, IN: Alpha. ISBN 978-1-592-57273-1.
- Rhodes, Peter John (2006). A History of the Classical Greek World: 478–323 BC. Malden and Oxford: Blackwell Publishing. ISBN 978-0-631-22565-2.
- Roisman, Joseph; Yardley, John C. (2011). Ancient Greece From Homer to Alexander: The Evidence. Malden and Oxford: Wiley-Blackwell. ISBN 978-1-405-12776-9.
- Zagorin, Perez (2009). Thucydides, An Introduction for the Common Reader. Princeton University Press. ISBN 9781400826797.
