= Battle of Oenophyta =

Battle between Athens and Boeotian city-states (457 BC)

- Part of the First Peloponnesian War
Date	457 BC
Location	Oenophyta
Result	Athenian victory

Belligerents
Athens	Boeotian city-states

Commanders and leaders
Myronides	Unknown

Strength
Unknown	Unknown

Casualties and losses
Unknown	100 wealthy hostages taken Unknown

The Battle of Oenophyta took place between Athens and the Boeotian city-states in 457 BC during the First Peloponnesian War.

In this period between the Persian Wars and the Peloponnesian War, alliances and leagues sprang up and collapsed, although there was very little prolonged warfare. In 457 BC Athens, the leader of the Delian League, came into conflict with Corinth and their ally Sparta (leader of the Peloponnesian League) over Megara; 62 days prior to the Battle of Oenophyta, the Athenians were defeated at the Battle of Tanagra by Sparta, but Sparta had lost so many men that they could not take advantage of their victory.

The Athenians, who had 14,000 men at Tanagra, regrouped after that battle and marched into Boeotia. At Oenophyta, led by Myronides they defeated the Boeotians, and then destroyed the walls of Tanagra and ravaged Locrida and Phocis. Their victory at Oenophyta was quickly followed by the surrender of Aegina, and the completion of the construction of the Long Walls to the Athenian port of Piraeus (an action opposed by Sparta).

Athens remained in control of Boeotia until 447 BC, when they were defeated at the Battle of Coronea.
