= Pleistoanax =

5th century BC Agiad King of Sparta

King of Sparta
- Reign: 458 – 409 BC
- Predecessor: Pleistarchus
- Successor: Pausanias
- Born: Sparta, Ancient Greece
- Died: 409 BC; Sparta, Ancient Greece

Pleistoanax, also spelled Plistoanax, (Ancient Greek: Πλειστοάναξ) was Agiad king of Sparta from 458 to 409 BC. He was the leader of the peace party in Sparta at a time of violent confrontations against Athens for the hegemony over Greece.

The son of Pausanias, Pleistoanax was still a minor in 458 BC, so his uncle Nicomedes acted as regent. His first recorded action was the invasion of Athens in 446 BC as part of the First Peloponnesian War (460–445 BC), but he chose instead to negotiate with Pericles a settlement that became the Thirty Years' Peace. However, Pleistoanax was sued in Sparta for his failure to take Athens and went into exile in Arcadia to avoid punishment. He lived on the sacred ground of Zeus in Mt. Lykaion for the next 18 years.

The death of the rival king Archidamus II in 427 enabled his return to Sparta, while the city was again at war against Athens in the Second Peloponnesian War (431–404 BC). Pleistoanax renewed his efforts to make peace with Athens, which was finally concluded in 421 (as the Peace of Nicias).

== Family background ==
Pleistoanax was the son of Pausanias, regent in the beginning of the reign of his nephew Pleistarchus (r. 480–459) until his murder by the ephors, possibly in 467/6, allegedly for Medism. He belonged to the Agiad dynasty, one of the two royal families in Sparta (the other being the Eurypontids). He was born in the second half of the 470s; two younger brothers rapidly followed: Cleomenes and Aristocles.

Pleistoanax succeeded his cousin Pleistarchus, who died childless in 459. As he was still a minor, his uncle Nicomedes (Pausanias' younger brother) became his regent.

== Reigns ==
=== First reign (459–445 BC) ===
At the time of Pleistoanax's accession, Greece was torn by the First Peloponnesian War (460–445 BC), a series of minor conflicts between Sparta and Athens and their respective allies. In 457 Pleistoanax's uncle and regent Nicomedes commanded a large army of 1500 Spartans and 10,000 allies to help Doris to repel an attack from Phokis. The army was considerably larger than needed to defeat Phokis, so its real goal was likely to invade Attica from the west. The other king, Archidamus II, did not command the expedition, either because he was still busy with the revolt of the Helots, or perhaps he disapproved it. Nicomedes drew the Athenians into battle by reaching Tanagra, close to their border. The subsequent battle was nevertheless a Pyrrhic victory for Sparta, which had to retreat to the Peloponnese by breaking through Megara on the Isthmus.

Pleistoanax's first campaign took place in the Summer of 446, at the expiration of a five year peace with Athens. As he was still young (in his 20's), Pleistoanax was given a group of advisers—the only named being Cleandridas (father of the famous Gylippus), probably ephor that year. Sparta exploited the revolts of Megara and the island of Euboia against Athens, which had forced Pericles to lead an army to the island. Pericles swiftly returned to the mainland when he heard that Pleistoanax had passed through the Isthmus and Megara to Athens, and was ravaging the area around Eleusis in Attica. While a battle looked inevitable, Pleistoanax and Pericles actually negotiated a settlement. Pericles abandoned all Athenian claims on the Greek mainland (apart from its own civic territory) and withdrew the garrisons from Megara, Troezen, and Achaia; the Spartan army then returned home.

However, upon his return, Pleistoanax and Cleandridas were accused by several Spartans of bribery for having spared Athens while they had the upper hand. Plutarch tells that Pericles listed the sum of ten talents (about 260kg of silver) in his accounts for his year of office, which would therefore be the money used to buy the Spartans. Although it is not impossible that Pleistoanax accepted the money, it is certainly not the only reason for his withdrawal. Perhaps he simply thought that Pericles' offer was enough for a campaign without any fighting. A solar eclipse took place on 2 September 446 and could have been interpreted as a bad omen to continue the war. In 480, Pleistoanax's grandfather, the regent Cleombrotus, had cancelled a campaign for the same reason. Another possibility is that Pleistoanax could have feared that if Athens became too weak, it would not have been unable to counter a new offensive of Persia into Greece. Pleistoanax was prosecuted immediately after his arrival to Sparta. A majority of the ephors and probably the other king Archidamus II voted against him. Although some modern scholars consider that Pleistoanax could have been sentenced to death, most think he was only fined 15 talents; the king nevertheless refused to pay and went into exile. Cleandridas received a death sentence, but fled to Thourioi in Italy, where he received the citizenship.

The terms of the peace negotiated between Pleistoanax and Pericles were ironically retained in the Thirty Years' Peace signed soon after.

=== Exile (445–427 BC) ===
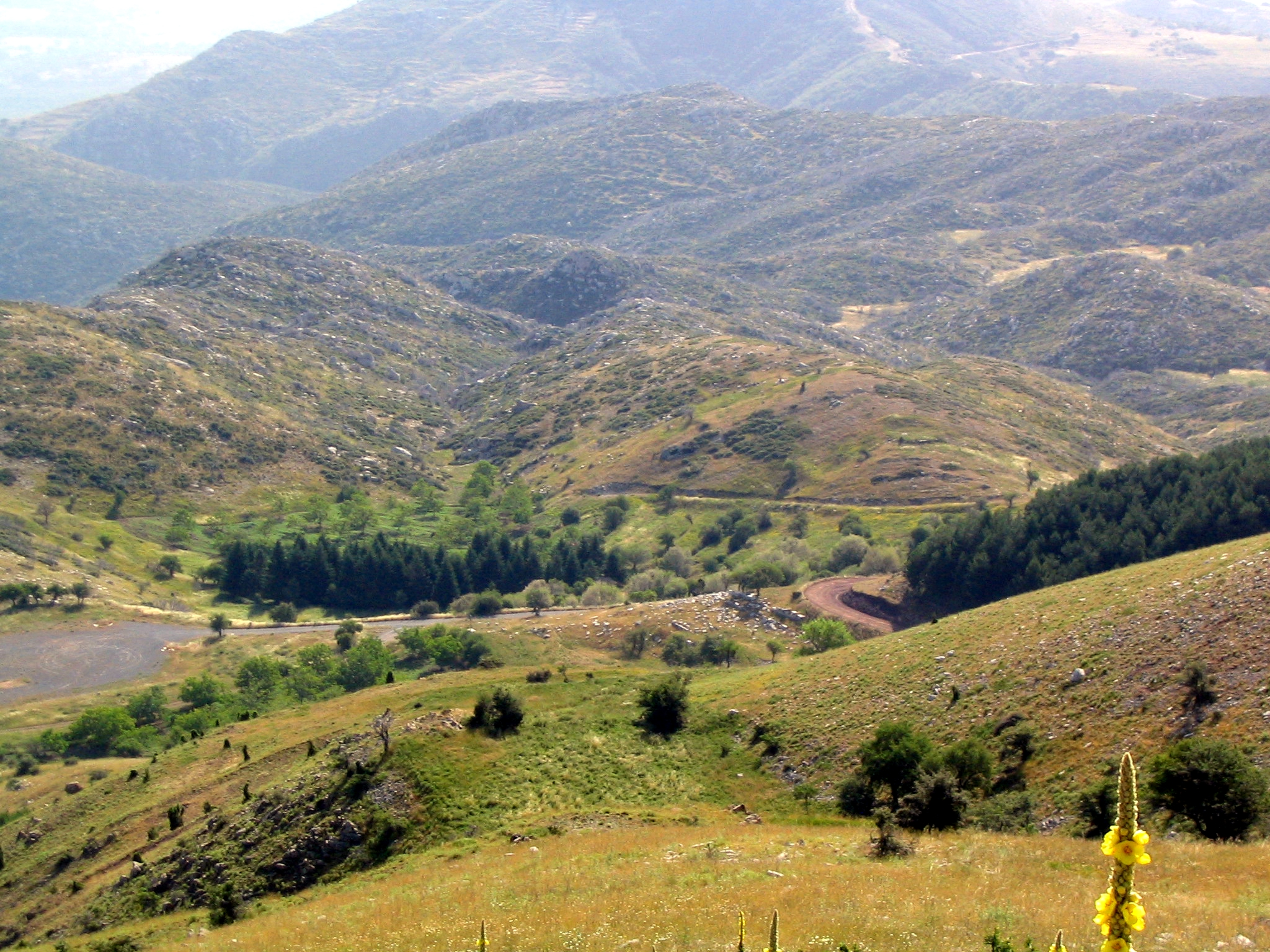
View of Mt. Lykaion, looking down to the sanctuary of Zeus.

In order to escape punishment, Pleistoanax tried a different strategy from that used by his father, who, although a suppliant in the Bronze House of Athena in Sparta, was starved to death by the ephors in this temple. The king left Laconia to Mount Lykaion in the territory of Parrhasia, a small city in Arcadia, where he built a house on the sacred ground of Zeus Lycaeus. Under this epithet, Zeus was worshipped as a god of light, so it seems that Pleistoanax aimed at finding a divine support of his deeds by living on the sacred ground of the god behind the eclipse of 446. The sacred ground provided him an additional protection against death from his fellow Spartans, either as a result of a death sentence, or an extrajudicial murder.

Pleistoanax's son Pausanias was born at about the same time as his father's departure into exile, perhaps even after. The choice to name his son after his father shows the defiance of Pleistoanax against the Spartan authorities, as Pausanias the Regent had been convicted of treason. The other king Archidamus II was certainly the main opponent of Pleistoanax and his supporters. He could de facto reign alone, because the infant Pausanias was in no position to contest Archidamus. For this reason, Archidamus constantly opposed Pleistoanax's recall from exile, despite multiple requests from the Delphic oracle.

Pleistoanax finally returned to Sparta in 427. Thucydides says that his younger brother Aristokles bribed the Pythia in order to convince the pious Spartans to recall him from exile. His return was more likely the result of Archidamus' death that year. There was also a genuine concern from Delphi to solve the rift between the two royal families as it weakened Sparta (Delphi's ally). Moreover, the Pythia knew that Pleistoanax would make peace between Athens and Sparta possible, which was desirable for Delphi, as the war hurt its finances by the lack of pilgrims and donations. Nevertheless, the corruption rumour stuck and Pleistoanax was still suspected of having bribed the Pythia in 421. Thucydides' source on this story may have been Agis II, son of Archidamus, which would explain the favourable picture of Archidamus in his History of the Peloponnesian War.

A ceremony was organised in Sparta to celebrate the king's return, which—according to Thucydides—used the same ancient sacrifices and songs as during the foundation of Sparta. The purpose of this ceremony was to reassert the authority of Pleistoanax over his son Pausanias, who had nominally reigned since 445. Its disposition were perhaps given by Delphi in another oracle.

=== Second reign (427–409 BC) ===
When Pleistoanax returned to Sparta, the city had been at war against Athens since 431 in the Peloponnesian War, which he had tried to prevent in 446. The Spartan strategy was to launch yearly invasion of Attica; that of 426 was led by Agis II, the other king and son of Archidamus, although he had just ascended the throne. It seems that Pleistoanax was passed over because he was not considered reliable to conduct the operations against Athens. However, Agis soon cancelled the attack because of several earthquakes, interpreted as bad omens. Julius Beloch thought that the earthquake was just a pretext, showing that, with the return of Pleistoanax, the Peace Party was now in power in Sparta. Pleistoanax was also responsible for the abrupt change of Sparta's attitude regarding Athens. After the defeat of Sphacteria in 425, Sparta sought peace with Athens and even proposed an alliance, but to no avail.

Pleistoanax is again found working for peace in 421. Thucydides explains his peaceful efforts by a selfish motivation: he wanted to end the war in order to stop the blame he received from some Spartans for any setback suffered by Sparta (as a result of his sacrilegious bribery of the Pythia). Pleistoanax more likely thought that making peace better served the interests of Sparta. This time, negotiations were successful and the Peace of Nicias was signed. The Athenian Nicias gave its name to the treaty, but it could have also been named the peace of Pleistoanax due to his role in the settlement.

Several Spartan allies were dissatisfied by the Treaty, and Mantinea even left the Peloponnesian League in 421, which prompted a war with Sparta. Pleistoanax was chosen to lead an operation in Parrhasia, where Mantinea had built a fort in a strategic point (the later site of Megalopolis). By freeing the Parrhasians from the domination of Mantinea, Pleistoanax likely helped some allies he had made during his exile on nearby Mt. Lykaion.

He was succeeded by his son Pausanias.

== Bibliography ==
=== Ancient sources ===
- Plutarch, Parallel Lives (Pericles).

=== Modern sources ===
- Paul Cartledge, Agesilaos and the Crisis of Sparta, Baltimore, Johns Hopkins University Press, 1987. ISBN 978-0-7156-3032-7
- ——, Sparta and Lakonia, A Regional History 1300–362 BC, London, Routledge, 2002 (originally published in 1979). ISBN 0-415-26276-3
- Sara Forsdyke, Exile, Ostracism, and Democracy, the Politics of Expulsion in Ancient Greece, Princeton University Press, 2005. ISBN 0-691-11975-9
- Donald Kagan, The Outbreak of the Peloponnesian War, Ithaca/London, Cornell University Press, 1969. ISBN 0-8014-9556-3
- ——, The Archidamian War, Ithaca, Cornell University Press, 1974.
- ——, The Peace of Nicias and the Sicilian Expedition, Ithaca, Cornell University Press, 1981.
- Simon Hornblower, A Commentary on Thucydides, Volume I, Books I-III, Oxford, Clarendon Press, 1991. ISBN 0-19-815099-7
- Kalomira Mataranga, "Cléandridas le Spartiate : un cas énigmatique", Dialogues d'histoire ancienne, 2017, Suppl. 17, pp. 551–572.
- John Marr, "What Did the Athenians Demand in 432 B. C.?", Phoenix, Vol. 52, No. 1/2 (Spring – Summer, 1998), pp. 120–124.
- Herbert William Parke, "The Deposing of Spartan Kings", The Classical Quarterly, Vol. 39, No. 3/4 (Jul. – Oct. 1945), pp. 106–112.
- ——, D. E. W. Wormell, The Delphic Oracle: The History, Oxford, Blackwell, 1956.
- M. Phillipides, "King Pleistoanax and the Spartan Invasion of Attica in 446 B.C.", Ancient World, n°11 (1985), pp. 33–41. OCLC 1055663509
- Paul Poralla & Alfred S. Bradford, Prosopographie der Lakedaimonier, bis auf die Zeit Alexanders des Grossen, Chicago, 1985 (originally published in 1913). OCLC 1151065049
- Anton Powell (editor), A Companion to Sparta, Hoboken, Wiley, 2018. ISBN 978-1-4051-8869-2
- Paul A. Rahe, Sparta's First Attic War, The Grand Strategy of Classical Sparta, 478–446 B.C., New Haven, Yale University Press, 2019. ISBN 978-0-300-24261-4
- Nicolas Richer, La religion des Spartiates: croyances et cultes dans l'Antiquité, Paris, Les Belles Lettres, 2012. ISBN 978-2-251-38113-8
- Lionel Scott, Historical Commentary on Herodotus, Book 6, Leiden/Boston, Brill, 2005. ISBN 90-04-14506-0
- G. E. M. de Ste. Croix, The Origins of the Peloponnesian War, London, Duckworth, 1972. ISBN 0-7156-0640-9
- Mary E. White, "Some Agiad Dates: Pausanias and His Sons", The Journal of Hellenic Studies, Vol. 84 (1964), pp. 140–152.

Regnal titles
Preceded by Pleistarchus	Agiad King of Sparta; 458–409 BC	Succeeded by Pausanias
