= Leocrates =

5th-century BC Athenian military leader

Leocrates (Ancient Greek: Λεωκράτης), son of Stroebus (Ancient Greek: Στροῖβος), was a leading Athenian general of the First Peloponnesian War. He led the Athenian forces that conquered the island of Aegina, traditionally a naval rival of Athens.

In 458 BC, Leocrates led a large Athenian fleet that engaged the Aeginetan fleet in the Saronic Gulf near Aegina. After a major sea-battle in which reportedly the Athenians captured or sunk seventy ships, Leocrates led the Athenian forces ashore to besiege Aegina. The Aeginetans eventually surrendered to the Athenians and became subject allies of Athens.

Leocrates can probably be identified with Leocrates, son of Stroebus, the Athenian boxer of the 5th century BC mentioned by Quintilian for whom Simonides wrote a lyric poem ode. He is also often identified with the Leocrates who was a general along with Aristides and Myronides at the Battle of Plataea in 479 BC.
