= Battle of Coronea (447 BC) =

Military engagement between the Athenian-led Delian League and the Boeotian League

Coordinates: 38°21′N 22°58′E

- Part of the First Peloponnesian War
Date	447 BC
Location	Coronea
Result	Boeotian victory

Belligerents
Boeotian city-states	Delian League

Commanders and leaders
Sparton	Tolmides †

Strength
Unknown	1,000 hoplites, others?

Casualties and losses
Unknown	Unknown

The Battle of Coronea (also known as the First Battle of Coronea) took place between the Athenian-led Delian League and the Boeotian League in 447 BC during the First Peloponnesian War.

In 457 BC the Athenians had taken control of Boeotia at the Battle of Oenophyta, and spent the next ten years attempting to consolidate the League's power. In 454 BC Athens lost a fleet attempting to aid an Egyptian revolt against Persia; fearing revolts by the other members of the Delian League, Athens moved the treasury to their city from Delos in 453 BC, and signed the Peace of Callias with Persia around 450 BC.

The Delian League was essentially an Athenian empire, and while Athens was usually successful at holding their possessions in the Aegean Sea, they were less successful on land. By 447 BC some of the men exiled from Boeotia after the Athenian victory there in 457 BC had returned home and began to take back some of the Boeotian towns. The Athenians under Tolmides, with 1,000 hoplites plus other troops from their allies, marched into Boeotia to take back the recaptured towns. They captured Chaeronea, but were attacked and defeated by the Boeotians at Coronea. The Athenians were forced to give up control of Boeotia. Boeotia was allowed to leave the Delian League in return for allowing the Athenians to leave Boeotia safely. The defeat led to revolts on Euboea and in Megara, which in turn led to further conflict with Sparta, contributing to the Peloponnesian War.
