= Long Walls =

City wall in ancient Athens

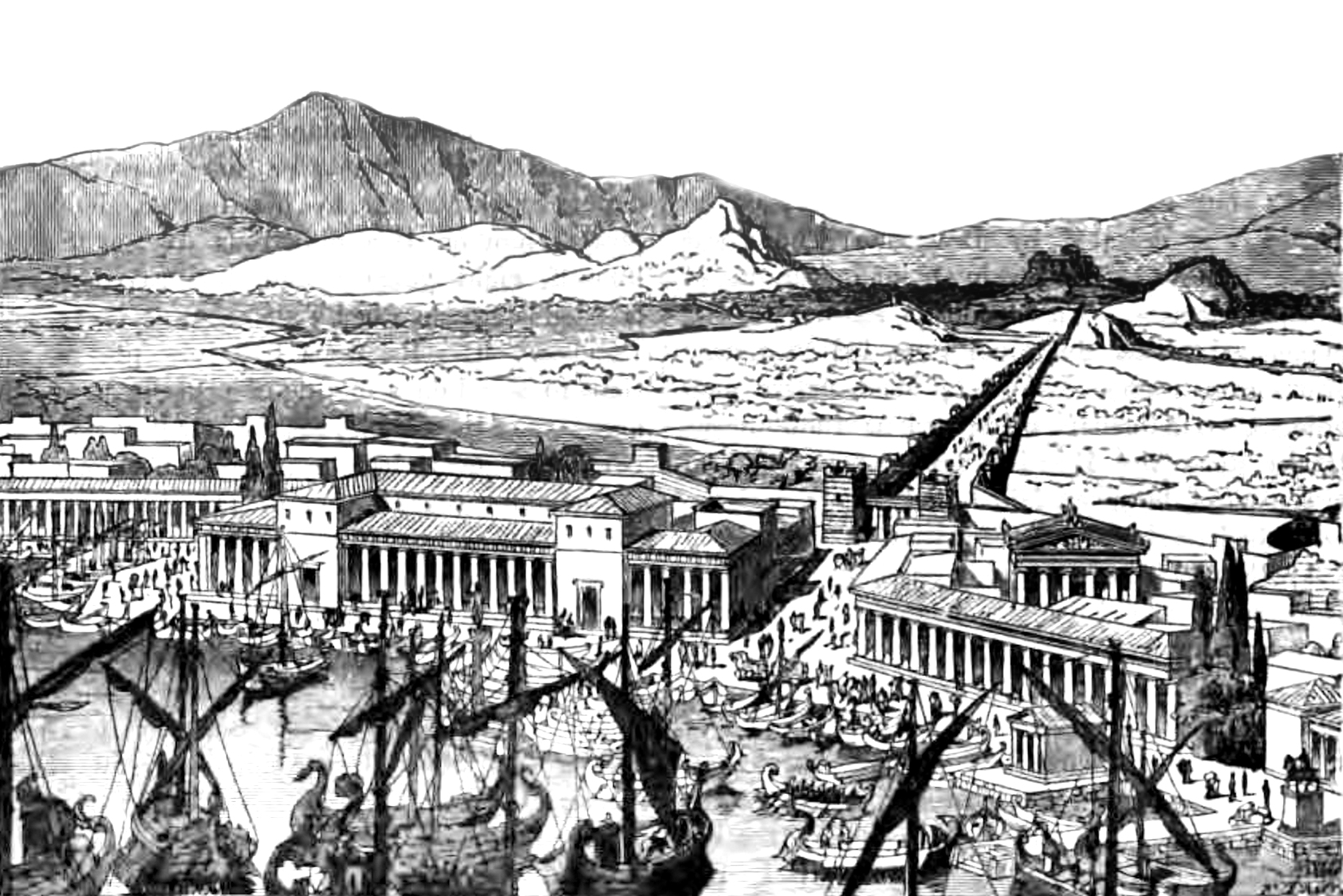
The Piraeus and the Long Walls of Athens

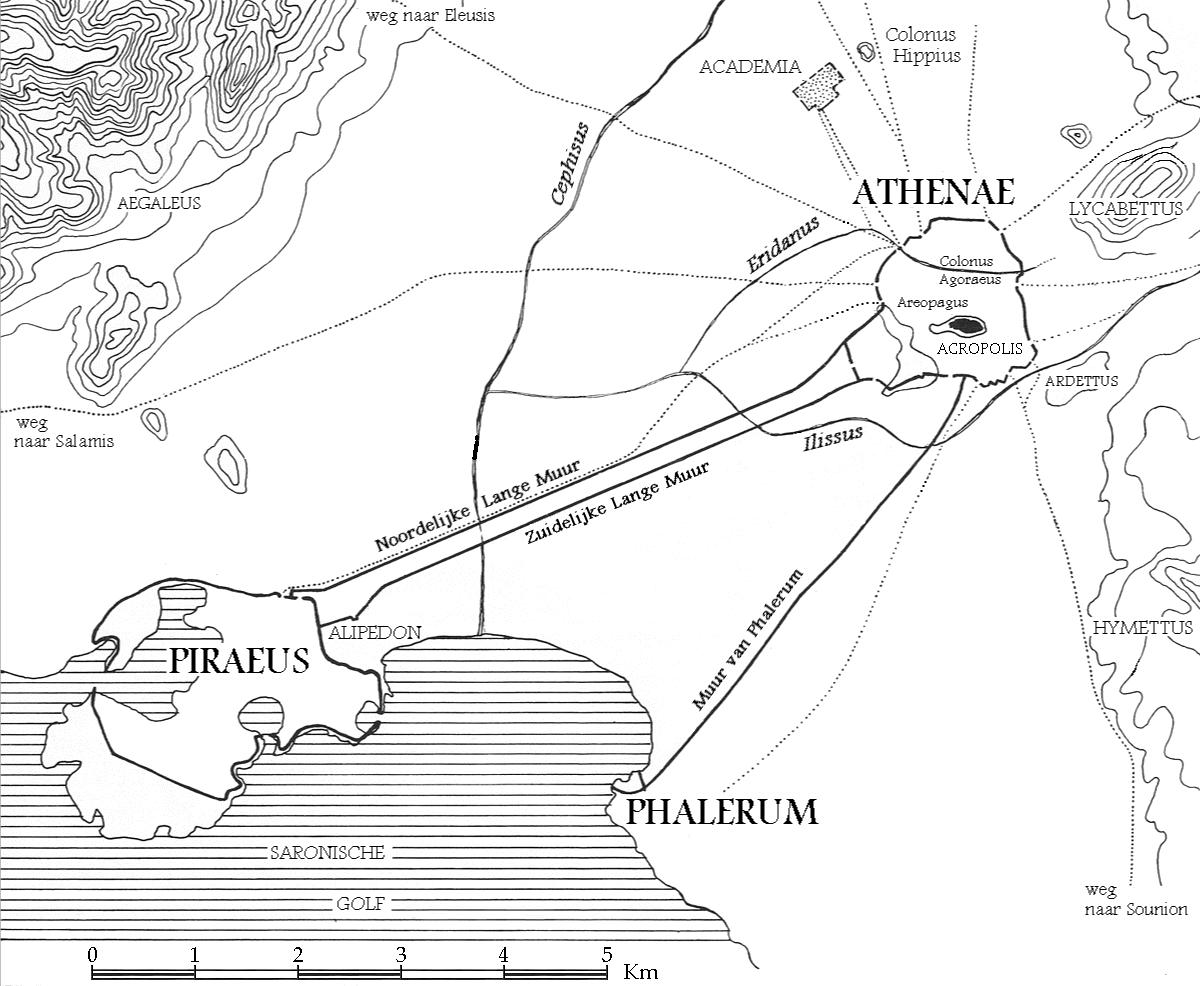
Ancient Athens

The Long Walls (Ancient Greek: Μακρὰ Τείχη [makra tei̯kʰɛː]) was a structure that connected Athens' main city to its ports at Piraeus and Phaleron.

Built in several phases, they provided a secure connection to the sea during times of siege. The walls were about 6 km (3.7 mi) in length. They were initially constructed in the mid-5th century BC, and destroyed by the Spartans in 403 BC after Athens' defeat in the Peloponnesian War. They were rebuilt with Persian support during the Corinthian War in 395–391 BC.

The Long Walls were a key element of Athenian military strategy, since they provided the city with a constant link to the sea and thwarted sieges conducted by land alone.

== History ==
=== Background ===
From the 5th century BC, the center of the Athenian military was the navy. The first fleet was created during a war with Aegina in the 480s BC. As part of the Delian League, founded by Athens in 477 BC, Athens became committed to the long-term prosecution of a naval war against the Achaemenid Empire. The navy's command of the sea allowed Athens to import grain from the Hellespont and Black Sea regions, and supported Athenian imperial dominance over the league.

During the second Persian invasion of Greece of 480–479 BC, the Achaemenids captured and destroyed Athens; the walls around the Acropolis were also demolished. The Athenians recaptured the city after the Persian invasion was decisively defeated at the Battle of Plataea. Reconstruction included the new Themistoclean Wall around the city. Construction of the wall was opposed by the Peloponnesian League, led by Sparta, which was alarmed by Athens' expanding power. Spartan envoys argued that the walls would make Athens a useful base for an invading army, and that the defenses of the Isthmus of Corinth made the walls unnecessary; even so, the envoys did not strongly protest and provided advice to the builders. Athens continued construction to reduce vulnerability to the Peloponnesian League. According to Thucydides, Athens bought time to complete the walls by agreeing to send a delegation to Sparta to discuss the matter and then delaying the dispatch of the delegates.

=== The first Long Walls ===
The first Long Walls began construction sometime in 462–458 BC during the First Peloponnesian War. These were a wall from Athens to the old port at Phalerum, and another wall from Athens to the newer port at Piraeus. The walls were completed soon after the Athenian defeat at the Battle of Tanagra in 457 BC. The walls enclosed, and secured the transport routes, between Athens and the ports. With control of the seas, the city could be resupplied by sea to resist land-based blockades and sieges; contemporary Greek warfare relied on starvation to force walled cities into surrender. The Long Walls prevented Sparta from capturing the city after Tanagra, and they became the Athens' main land defense when it lost Megara and Boeotia at the end of that war.

The Long Walls secured the navy's position as the main source of Athenian strength. The naval policy was not seriously questioned by either democrats or oligarchs until the late-5th century BC. Thucydides, son of Melesias, made opposition to an imperialist policy an oligarch position. In the "Constitution of the Athenians" argued that Athens' naval supremacy and its democracy were interdependent; this view is shared by modern scholars.

The first walls are designated Phase 1a in modern archaeology.

=== The Middle Wall ===
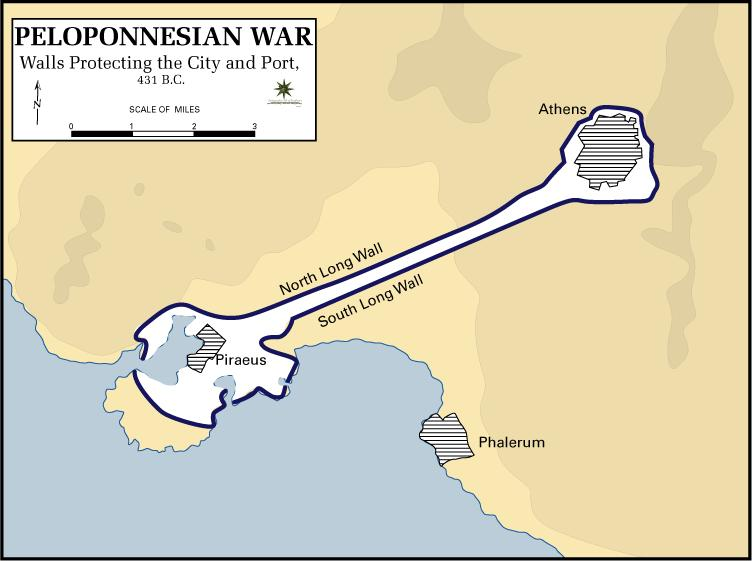

The third Long Wall, called the "Middle Wall" or "Southern Wall", was constructed in the 440s BC. The third wall ran from Athens to Piraeus, south of and parallel to the first Athens–Piraeus wall; the two walls created a narrow protected corridor. By this time, Piraeus had superseded Phalerum as the primary port, which likely drove a re-evaluation of the fortification system. The new wall addressed the vulnerability created by the unprotected shoreline between the ports and original walls. The first phase ended in 421 BC with the Peace of Nicias.

The second phase started after the Athenian Sicilian Expedition was defeated with heavy naval and army losses. Sparta fortified and garrisoned Decelea, north of Athens in Attica, in 413 BC; the threat from the garrison forced Athens to once again retreat behind the walls and rely on resupply by sea. Athens began modifying its walls in the summer of 413 BC and ultimately abandoned the Athens-Phaleron wall. Sparta developed a navy and began contesting Athenian sea control. In 405 BC, the Athenian fleet was destroyed at the Battle of Aegospotami and Athens was brought under a sea and land blockade. In 404 BC, Athens surrendered after a period of starvation; the Long Walls were demolished the same year as required by the peace treaty. According to Xenophon, the walls were torn down with celebration.

=== Rebuilding the Long Walls ===
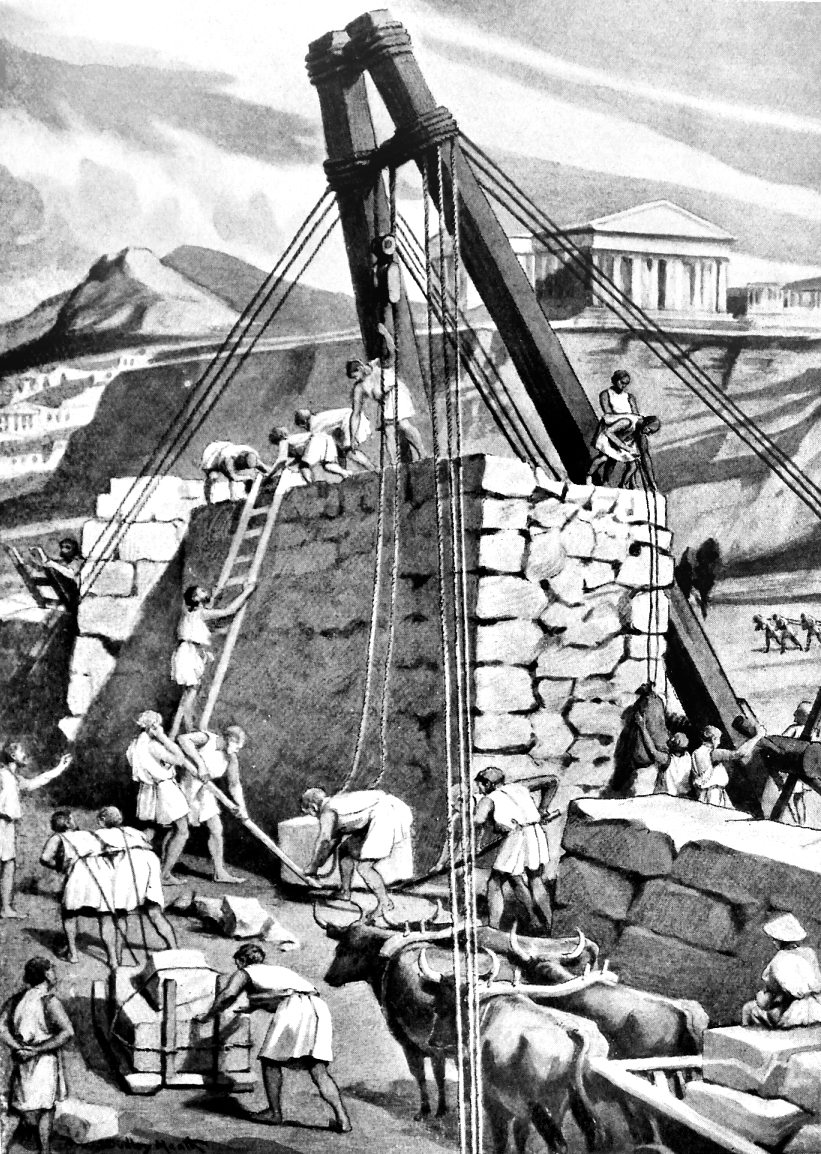
20th century depiction of the rebuilding of the walls of Athens.

Athens quickly regained its autonomy. In 403 BC, the Spartan-installed Athenian government was overthrown in the Phyle Campaign. By 395 BC, the refortification of Athens had begun and Athens joined the Corinthian War against Sparta. At the time the anti-Spartan alliance included the Persian Empire. In 394 BC, a Persian fleet commanded by Pharnabazus II, Satrap of Hellespontine Phrygia, destroyed the Spartan fleet at the Battle of Cnidus. Afterwards, the fleet moved to Athens where it provided protection and manpower for the reconstruction of the Long Walls; Pharnabazus II contributed money for the construction. According to Conon, an Athenian commander employed by the Persians, construction was in the final stages by 391 BC.

=== The Long Walls in the 4th century BC ===
From the Corinthian War down to the final defeat of the city by Philip of Macedon, the Long Walls continued to play a central role in Athenian strategy. The Decree of Aristoteles in 377 BC reestablished an Athenian league containing many former members of the Delian League. By the middle of the 4th century, Athens was again the preeminent naval power of the Greek world, and had reestablished the supply routes that allowed it to withstand a land-based siege.

The Long Walls had become obsolete and the length and location of the structures rendered them dangerously vulnerable to the advanced siege techniques of the day. The Athenians began to strengthen their urban defense systems by rebuilding the Long Walls again to be able to withstand contemporary methods of assault in 337 BC. The new walls included attributes such as substructures built of cut blocks and possibly even roofs above the walk-ways.

However, the Athenians were not in a position to use the new Long Walls until Alexander the Great's death in 323 BC. By this time Athens' navy had been crushed during the Battle of Amorgos in the Lamian War and they became subordinate to the Macedonians and the use of the Long Walls in a naval strategy was ruled out. Macedonian leaders controlled cities on both sides of the Long Walls and they had little use for these fortifications, thus the mid-fourth century Long Walls were never actually employed.

=== Later history ===
The walls were still standing at the beginning of the 1st century BC. However, during the First Mithridatic War, the Siege of Athens and Piraeus (87–86 BC) was won by the Roman general Sulla and he destroyed the Long Walls.

== See also ==
- City walls of Athens

== Sources ==
- G.E.M. de Ste. Croix. The Origins of the Peloponnesian War. Duckworth and Co., 1972. ISBN 0-7156-0640-9
- Fine, John V. A. The Ancient Greeks: A Critical History. Harvard University Press, 1983. ISBN 0-674-03314-0
- Hornblower, Simon and Spawforth, Anthony ed. The Oxford Classical Dictionary. Oxford University Press, 2003. ISBN 0-19-866172-X
- Kagan, Donald. The Peloponnesian War. Penguin Books, 2003. ISBN 0-670-03211-5
- Kagan, Donald. The Outbreak of the Peloponnesian War. Cornell, 1969. ISBN 0-8014-9556-3
- Conwell, David H. Connecting a City to the Sea: The History of the Athenian Long Walls. Brill NV, 2008. ISBN 978-90-04-16232-7
