= Battle of Tanagra (457 BC) =

Battle between Athens and Sparta (457 BC)

Coordinates: 38°19′N 23°32′E

- Part of First Peloponnesian War
| Date | 457 BC |
| Location | Tanagra |
| Result | Spartan victory |

Belligerents
| Athens | Sparta |

Commanders and leaders
| Myronides | Nicomedes |

Strength
| 14,000 | 11,500 |

Casualties and losses
| 2,100 dead. | 1,500 dead. |

The Battle of Tanagra was a land battle that took place in Boeotia in 457 BC between Athens and Sparta during the First Peloponnesian War. Tension between Athens and Sparta had built up due the rebuilding of Athens' walls and Spartan rejection of Athenian military assistance. The Athenians were led by Myronides and held a strength of 14,000. The Spartans were led by Nicomedes and had a total of 11,500 soldiers. While both the Athenians and Spartans suffered great losses, Sparta ultimately claimed victory in this battle.

An Map of Boeotia in ancient Greece.

== Background ==
Prior to the breakout of this battle, in the Persian Wars, the Spartan-led Peloponnesian League won a hegemony. As time progressed the Peloponnesian League grew to fear the power of the Athenian Empire. Relations between the Peloponnesian League worsened due to a breakdown in diplomatic affronts and demands.

In 478 BC, wanting to deny any future Persian invasion a base from which to operate, Sparta had urged Athens, along with other Greek cities, to refrain from rebuilding their walls. However, suspecting a Spartan ploy and having already begun the work of construction, Athens employed subterfuge to delay the wheels of diplomacy until Athens could finish them. Athens did this by waiting to send Athenian politician Themistocles to Lacedaemon until Athens had started constructing the walls resulting in the Long Walls being nearly completed by the time Themistocles told Sparta that there were plans to rebuild the Long Walls.

Map of the Long Walls built by Athens.

In 464 BC, suffering another Helot rebellion and failing to make progress in the siege against their stronghold Ithome, Sparta had asked for Athens' aid along with its other allies. A "considerable force" was sent out to support the Spartans at the urging of Cimon, who was appointed its commander. Sparta grew suspicious that the Athenians were potentially aiding the helots in Ithome in their uprising. Sparta turned away the Athenian forces that were sent to aid Sparta. These actions resulted in rising political tensions between Athens and Sparta. Athens was insulted and humiliated by Sparta’s actions, and this led to Athens breaking their alliance with Sparta.

In 458 BC, Athens began building the Long Walls, a defensive structure that secured the communication lines between the city and Piraeus. Like other walls that were built, it allowed the Athenians to refuse battle and retreat without fear of being cut from supplies coming from the sea.

== Battle ==
When the Phocians made war on the cities of Doris—the traditional homeland of Doric Greeks—the Doric Sparta sent a relief force under the command of Nicomedes, son of Cleombrotus, acting as regent for his under-age nephew, King Pleistoanax. An army of 1,500 Spartan hoplites with 10,000 of their allies entered Boeotia and compelled the submission of Phocis.

Athens, already contemptuous of Spartan treatment and now suspecting Sparta of negotiating with factions within the city to undermine democracy and prevent the construction of the Long Walls, maneuvered to cut off the Spartan army isolated in Boeotia.

The exiled Athenian politician and general Cimon met with the Athenian with his own forces known as the tribe known as the Oeneis to assist Athens. Cimon was turned away from assisting the Athenian forces due to the Council of 500 fearing it would disrupt Athens forces.

Facing either transport through waters controlled by the Athenian navy or a difficult march through the Geraneia mountain passes held by Athenian soldiers supported from Megara, the Spartans decided to wait either for the opening of a safe route home or an outright Athenian assault.

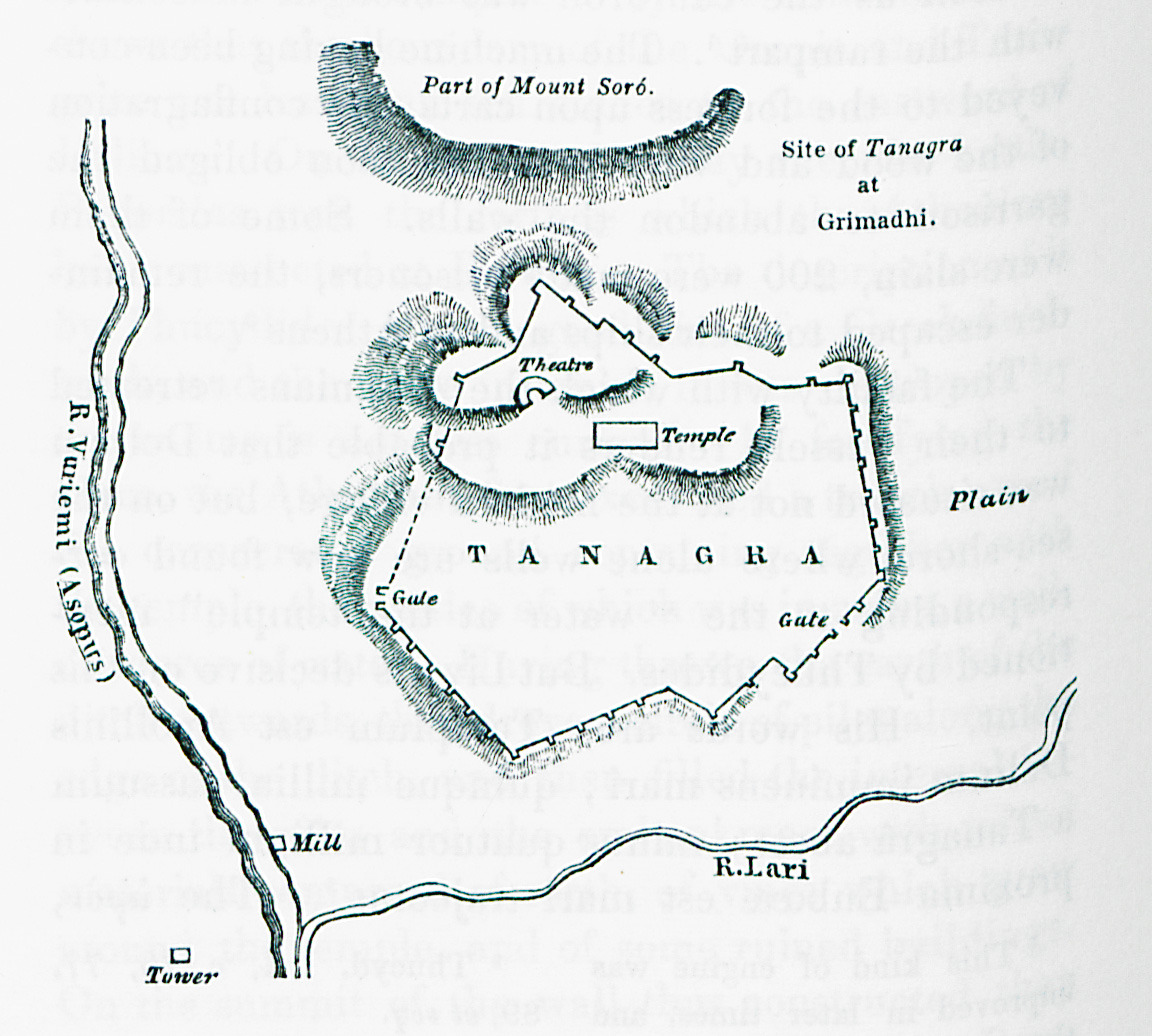
An Ancient Map of Tanagra

The battle was fought at Tanagra where the Athenian forces of 14,000 strong with their 1,000 allies from Argos met Sparta with 11,500 strong with 1,500 Spartans and 10,000 allied Hoplites. No details or accounts of the battle have been found.

While no description of the events within the battle was given, both the Spartan and Athenian forces claimed both suffered great losses. Sparta claimed victory of this battle and were now able to return home through the mountain passes of the Isthmus, cutting down the fruit trees once crossing into the Megarid along the journey home.

== Aftermath ==
Sixty two days after the battle, the Athenians regrouped under the command of Myronides. They then defeated Thebes at the Battle of Oenophyta and took control of Boeotia, taking down the wall the Spartans had built and taking one hundred of the richest men of the Opuntian Locris as hostages. With the victory, the Athenians also occupied Phocis, the original source of the conflict and the Opuntian Locris. Years after the Battle of Tanagra, Cimon was recalled from exile due to the special relations they had between Sparta and Athens. With these special relations, Cimon helped create a five year peace treaty between Athens and Sparta.
