= First Peloponnesian War =

Ancient Greek war (460–445 BC)

Date	460–445 BC
Location	Mainland Greece
Result	Thirty Years' Peace
Territorial changes	Megara was returned to the Peloponnesian League, Troezen and Achaea became independent, Aegina was to be a tributary to Athens but autonomous, and disputes were to be settled by arbitration.

Belligerents
Delian League led by Athens, Argos	Peloponnesian League led by Sparta, Thebes

Commanders and leaders
Pericles; Cimon; Leocrates; Tolmides; Myronides; Carnius	Pleistoanax; Nicomedes

The First Peloponnesian War (460–445 BC) was fought between Spartans as the leaders of the Peloponnesian League and Sparta's other allies, most notably Thebes, and the Delian League led by Athenians with support from Argos. This war consisted of a series of conflicts and minor wars, such as the Second Sacred War. There were several causes for the war including the building of the Athenian long walls, Megara's defection and the envy and concern felt by Sparta at the growth of the Athenian Empire.

The First Peloponnesian War began in 460 BC with the Battle of Oenoe, where Spartan forces were defeated by those of Athenian-Argive alliance. At first the Athenians had the better of the fighting, winning the naval engagements using their superior fleet. They also had the better of the fighting on land, until 457 BC when the Spartans and their allies defeated the Athenian army at Tanagra. The Athenians, however, counterattacked and scored a crushing victory over the Boeotians at the Battle of Oenophyta and followed this victory up by conquering all of Boeotia except for Thebes.

Athens further consolidated their position by making Aegina a member of the Delian League and by ravaging the Peloponnese. The Athenians were defeated in 454 BC by the Persians in Egypt which caused them to enter into a five years' truce with Sparta. However, the war flared up again in 448 BC with the start of the Second Sacred War. In 446 BC, Boeotia revolted and defeated the Athenians at Coronea and regained their independence.

The First Peloponnesian War ended in an arrangement between Sparta and Athens, which was ratified by the Thirty Years' Peace (winter of 446–445 BC). According to the provisions of this peace treaty, both sides maintained the main parts of their empires. Athens continued its domination of the sea while Sparta dominated the land. Megara returned to the Peloponnesian League and Aegina became a tribute-paying but autonomous member of the Delian League. The war between the two leagues restarted in 431 BC, leading to the Second Peloponnesian War. It ended with a conclusive Spartan victory, where, in 404 BC, Athens was occupied by Sparta.

== Origins and causes ==
A map of the Delian League.

Only twenty years before the First Peloponnesian War broke out, Athens and Spartans had fought alongside each other in the Greco-Persian Wars. In that war, Sparta held hegemony over what modern scholars call the Hellenic League and the overall command in the crucial victories of 480 and 479 BC. Over the next several years, however, Spartan leadership bred resentment among the Greek naval powers that took the lead in carrying the war against Persian territories in Asia and the Aegean, and after 478 BC the Spartans abandoned their leadership of this campaign. Sparta grew wary of Athens' strength after they had fought alongside each other to disperse the Persians from their lands. When Athens started to rebuild its walls and the strength of its naval power, Sparta and its allies began to fear that Athens was becoming too powerful. Different policies made it difficult for Athens and Sparta to avoid going to war, since Athens wanted to expand its territory and Sparta wanted to dismantle the Athenian democratic regime.

Athens, meanwhile, had been asserting itself on the international scene, and was eager to take the lead in the Aegean. The Athenians had already rebuilt their walls, against the express wishes of Sparta. In 479 BC and 478 BC Athens also took a much more active role in the Aegean campaigning. In the winter of 479–478 BC they accepted the leadership of a new league, the Delian League, in a conference of Ionian and Aegean states at Delos. The Athenians rebuilt their walls in secret at the urging of Themistocles, who convinced the Athenians that this was the best way to protect themselves. Themistocles also delayed talks with Sparta for universal arms control by constantly finding issues with Sparta's proposals, stating that it would leave Athens vulnerable to Sparta's superior hoplites and phalanx fighting formation. After the completion of the walls, Themistocles declared Athens independent of Spartan hegemony, stating that Athens knew what was in its best interest and was now strong enough to defend itself. At this time, one of the first hints of animosity between Athens and Sparta emerged in an anecdote reported by Diodorus Siculus, who said that the Spartans in 475–474 BC considered reclaiming the hegemony of the campaign against Persia by force. Modern scholars, although uncertain of the dating and reliability of this story, have generally cited it as evidence of the existence, even at this early date, of a "war party" in Sparta.

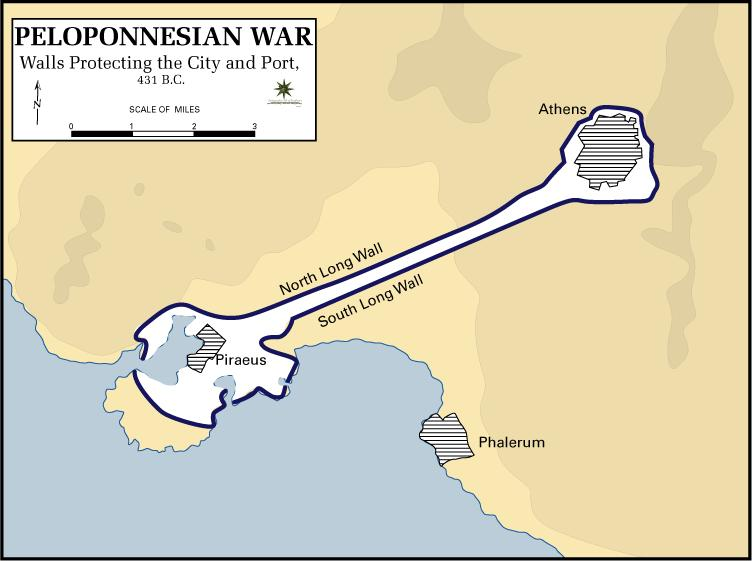
The Athenian long walls which connected Athens to Piraeus.

For some time, however, friendly relations prevailed between Athens and Sparta. Themistocles, the Athenian of the period most associated with an anti-Spartan policy, was ostracised at some point in the late 470s BC, and was later forced to flee to Persia. In his place, the Athenian general and statesman Cimon advocated a policy of cooperation between the two states, acting as Sparta's proxenos at Athens. Still, hints of conflict emerged. Thucydides reports that in the mid 460s BC, Sparta decided to invade Attica during the Thasian rebellion, but was stopped by an earthquake in 464 BC that triggered a revolt among the helots.

It was that helot revolt which would eventually bring on the crisis that precipitated the war. Unable to quell the revolt themselves, the Spartans summoned all their allies to assist them, invoking the old Hellenic League ties, especially looking for help from the Athenians, who, at this point, had become known for their siege warfare. Athens responded to the call, sending out 4,000 men with Cimon at their head. However, when the Athenians failed at their siege efforts against the helots, the Spartans became fearful of Athens' revolutionary views being so close to the helots and Spartans. Fearing the Athenians may choose to side with the revolting helots, the Spartans sent them back home to Athens, alone of all their allies. This action destroyed the political credibility of Cimon; he had already been under assault by his Athenian opponents led by Ephialtes, and shortly after this embarrassment he was ostracized. The demonstration of Spartan hostility was unmistakable, and when Athens responded, events spiraled rapidly into war. Athens concluded several alliances in quick succession: one with Thessaly, a powerful state in the north; one with Argos, Sparta's traditional enemy for centuries; and one with Megara, a former ally of Sparta's which was faring badly in a border war with Sparta's more powerful ally, Corinth. At about the same time, Athens settled the helots exiled after the defeat of their revolt at Naupactus on the Corinthian Gulf. By 460 BC, Athens found itself openly at war with Corinth and several other Peloponnesian states, and a larger war was imminent.

== Early battles ==
As this war was beginning, Athens also took on a serious military commitment in another part of the Aegean when they sent a force to assist Inarus, a Libyan king who had led almost all of Egypt in revolt from the Persian king Artaxerxes. Athens and her allies sent a fleet of 200 ships to assist Inarus; a substantial investment of resources. Thus, Athens entered the war with her forces spread across several theatres of conflict.

The impact this had on the Athenians can be seen in an inscription dating to 460 or 459 BC which lists the dead of the tribe Erechtheis. It is unusual in focusing on a single tribe as it was common for the dead of all ten tribes to be listed together on either a single Stele or several adjoining stelai with a common title. Perhaps it can be explained in this instance, however, by the unusually high death toll; 185 personal names are listed on the inscription in total. The list is preceded by an inscription which is translated thus: 'Of the tribe Erechtheis, these died in the war, in Cyprus, in Egypt, in Phoenicia, in Halieis, in Aegina, at Megara, during the same year'. This fits very closely with Thucydides' account, the last three chronologically following the order he gives. Thucydides does not, however, mention Phoenicia, so the inscription gives evidence for fighting in a place we would otherwise not associate with this period. Also significant is the phrase εν τῳ πολεμῳ 'in the war' suggesting that all these arenas were still considered (or intended to seem) a single war, in contrast to a similar list of the 440s BC where the casualties died εν τοις πολεμοις 'in the wars'. CF Peloponnesian War.

In either 460 or 459 BC, Athens fought a number of major battles against the combined forces of several Peloponnesian states. On land, the Athenians were defeated by the armies of Corinth and Epidaurus at Halieis, but at sea they were victorious at Cecryphaleia (a small island between Aegina and the coast of Epidaurus). Alarmed by this Athenian aggressiveness in the Saronic Gulf, Aegina entered into the war against Athens, combining its powerful fleet with that of the Peloponnesian allies. In the resulting sea battle, the Athenians won a commanding victory, capturing seventy Aeginetan and Peloponnesian ships. They then landed at Aegina and, led by Leocrates, laid siege to the city.

With substantial Athenian detachments tied down in Egypt and Aegina, Corinth invaded the Megaris, attempting to force the Athenians to withdraw their forces from Aegina to meet this new threat. Instead, the Athenians scraped together a force of men too old and boys too young for ordinary military service and sent this force, under the command of Myronides, to relieve Megara. The resulting battle was indecisive, but the Athenians held the field at the end of the day and were thus able to set up a trophy of victory. About twelve days later the Corinthians attempted to return to the site to set up a trophy of their own, but the Athenians issued forth from Megara and routed them; during the retreat after the battle a large section of the Corinthian army blundered into a ditch-ringed enclosure on a farm, where they were trapped and massacred.

=== Tanagra ===
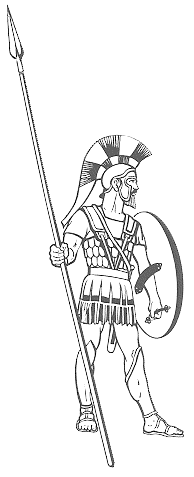
A Greek hoplite made up the majority of the soldiers in a state's army.

For several years at the beginning of the war, Sparta remained largely inert. Spartan troops may have been involved in some of the early battles of the war, but if so, they were not specifically mentioned in any sources. In 458 BC or 457 BC, Sparta at last made a move, but not directly at Athens. A war had broken out between Athens' ally Phocis and Doris, across the Corinthian Gulf from the Peloponnese. Doris was traditionally identified as the homeland of the Dorians, and the Spartans, being Dorians, had a long-standing alliance with that state. Accordingly, a Spartan army under the command of the general Nicomedes, acting as deputy for the under-age king Pleistoanax, was dispatched across the Corinthian Gulf to assist. This army forced the Phocians to accept terms, but while the army was in Doris an Athenian fleet moved into position to block its return across the Corinthian Gulf.

At this point Nicomedes led his army south into Bœotia. Several factors may have influenced his decision to make this move. First, secret negotiations had been underway with a party at Athens which was willing to betray the city to the Spartans in order to overthrow the democracy. Furthermore, Donald Kagan has suggested that Nicomedes had been in contact with the government of Thebes and planned to unify Boeotia under Theban leadership; which, upon his arrival, he seems to have done.

With a strong Spartan army in Boeotia and the threat of treason in the air, the Athenians marched out with as many troops, both Athenian and allied, as they could muster to challenge the Peloponnesians. The two armies met at the Battle of Tanagra. Before the battle, the exiled Athenian politician Cimon, armored for battle, approached the Athenian lines to offer his services, but was ordered to depart; before going, he ordered his friends to prove their loyalty through their bravery. This they did, but the Athenians were defeated in the battle, although both sides suffered heavy losses. The Spartans, rather than invading Attica, marched home across the isthmus, and Donald Kagan believes that at this point Cimon was recalled from exile and negotiated a four-month truce between the sides; other scholars believe no such truce was concluded, and place Cimon's return from exile at a later date. Athenian success can also be attributed to them making an alliance with Argos, Sparta's enemy and only threat for control over the Peloponnesian league. The alliance between Athens and Argos was moreover seen as a defensive measure to counteract Sparta's military strength.

=== Athenian successes ===
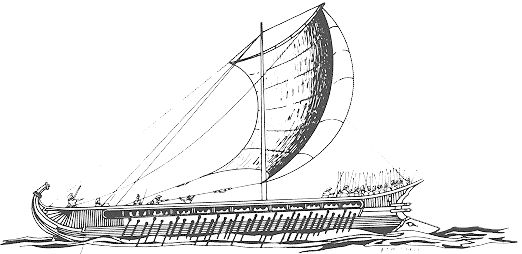
A Greek trireme, the main type of ships used by the Greek states.

The Athenians rebounded well after their defeat at Tanagra, by sending an army under Myronides to attack Boeotia. The Boeotian army gave battle to the Athenians at Oenophyta. The Athenians scored a crushing victory which led to the Athenians conquering all of Boeotia except for Thebes, as well as Phocis and Locris. The Athenians pulled down Tanagra's fortifications and took the hundred richest citizens of Locris and made them hostages. The Athenians also took this chance to complete the construction of their long walls.

Shortly after this, Aegina surrendered and was forced to pull down its walls, surrender its fleet and became a tribute-paying member of the Delian League, completing what Donald Kagan has called an annus mirabilis for the Athenians.

The Athenians, pleased by their success, sent an expedition under the general Tolmides to ravage the coast of the Peloponnese. The Athenians circumnavigated the Peloponnese and attacked and sacked the Spartan dockyards, whose location was most probably Gythium. The Athenians followed up this success by capturing the city of Chalcis on the Corinthian Gulf and then landing in the territory of Sicyon and defeating the Sicyonians in battle.

=== The importance of Megara ===
Modern scholars have emphasised the critical significance of Athenian control of Megara in enabling the early Athenian successes in the war. Megara provided a convenient port on the Corinthian Gulf, to which Athenian rowers could be transported overland, and a significant number of ships were probably kept at Megara's port of Pagae throughout the war. Moreover, while early modern scholars were sceptical of Athens' ability to prevent a Spartan army from moving through the Megarid, recent scholarship has concluded that the pass of Geraneia could have been held by a relatively small force. Thus, with the isthmus of Corinth closed and Athenian fleets in both the Corinthian and Saronic gulfs, Attica was unassailable from the Peloponnese. The Spartans' inability to attack Megara proved to be a key component in their loss to the Athenians, but one scholar believes that the Spartans' inability to attack and control Megara was due to poor calculations and Athenian efforts to avoid an open land battle with the Spartans.

== Truce after the Athenian defeat at Egypt ==
Athens' remarkable string of successes came to a sudden halt in 454 BC, when its Egyptian expedition was finally crushingly defeated. A massive Persian army under Megabazus had been sent overland against the rebels in Egypt some time earlier, and upon its arrival had quickly routed the rebel forces. The Greek contingent had been besieged on the island of Prosopitis in the Nile. In 454 BC, after a siege of 18 months, the Persians captured the island, destroying the force almost entirely. Though the force that was obliterated was probably not as large as the 200 ships that had originally been sent, it was at least 40 ships with their full complements, a significant number of men.

It was in 454 that the treasury of the Delian League, which Athens was head of, was moved from Delos to Athens. This change gave Athens greater control over the finances of the league, and a number of inscriptions survive showing who contributed to the wealth of the league and how much each city gave. Osborne and Rhodes' new book containing a great number of the inscriptions available from this period has one tribute list from 454/3 depicting the amount of tribute which Athens received from its allies and which it dedicated to Athena. The change in the location of the treasury is often pin-pointed as a focal point for the realization of an Athenian empire.

The disaster in Egypt severely shook Athenian control of the Aegean, and for some years afterwards the Athenians concentrated their attention on reorganising the Delian League and stabilizing the region. The Athenians responded to a call for assistance from Orestes, the son of Echecratides, King of Thessaly, to restore him after he was exiled. Together with their Boeotian and Phocian allies, the Athenians marched to Pharsalus, today's Farsala. They were not able to achieve their goals because of the Thessalian cavalry and were forced to return to Athens not having restored Orestes or captured Pharsalus.

Therefore, in 451 BC, when Cimon returned to the city, his ostracism over, the Athenians were willing to have him negotiate a truce with Sparta. Cimon arranged a five-year truce, and over the next several years Athens concentrated its efforts in the Aegean.

== Second Sacred War ==
The years after the truce were eventful ones in Greek politics. The Peace of Callias, if it existed, was concluded in 449 BC. It was probably in that same year that Pericles passed the Congress decree, calling for a pan-Hellenic congress to discuss the future of Greece. Modern scholars have debated extensively over the intent of that proposal; some regard it as a good faith effort to secure a lasting peace, while others view it as a propaganda tool. In any event, Sparta derailed the congress by refusing to attend.

In the same year the Second Sacred War erupted, when Sparta detached Delphi from Phocis and rendered it independent. In 448 BC, Pericles led the Athenian army against Delphi, in order to reinstate Phocis to its former sovereign rights over the oracle of Delphi.

In 447 BC a revolt broke out in Boeotia which was to spell the end of Athens' "continental empire" on the Greek mainland. Tolmides led an army out to challenge the Boeotians, but, after some early successes, was defeated at the Battle of Coronea. In the wake of this defeat, Pericles adopted a more moderate stance and Athens abandoned Boeotia, Phocis, and Locris.

The defeat at Coronea, however, triggered a more dangerous disturbance, in which Euboea and Megara revolted. Pericles crossed over to Euboea with his troops to quash the rebellion there, but was forced to return when the Spartan army invaded Attica. Through negotiation and possibly bribery, Pericles persuaded the Spartan king Pleistoanax to lead his army home. Back in Sparta, Pleistoanax would later be prosecuted for failing to press his advantage, and fined so heavily that he was forced to flee into exile, unable to pay. With the Spartan threat removed, Pericles crossed back to Euboea with 50 ships and 5,000 soldiers, crushing all opposition. He then inflicted a harsh punishment on the landowners of Chalcis, who lost their properties. The residents of Istiaia, who had butchered the crew of an Athenian trireme, were uprooted and replaced by 2,000 Athenian settlers. The arrangement between Sparta and Athens was ratified by the "Thirty Years' Peace" (winter of 446–445 BC). According to this treaty, Megara was returned to the Peloponnesian League, Troezen and Achaea became independent, Aegina was to be a tributary to Athens but autonomous, and disputes were to be settled by arbitration. Each party agreed to respect the alliances of the other.

== Significance and aftermath ==
The middle years of the First Peloponnesian War marked the peak of Athenian power. Holding Boeotia and Megara on land and dominating the sea with its fleet, the city had stood utterly secure from attack. The events of 447 BC and 446 BC, however, destroyed this position, and although not all Athenians gave up their dreams of unipolar control of the Greek world, the peace treaty that ended the war laid out the framework for a bipolar Greece. In return for abandoning her continental territories, Athens received recognition of her alliance by Sparta. The peace concluded in 445 BC, however, would last for less than half of its intended 30 years. In 431 BC, Athens and Sparta would go to war once again in the (second) Peloponnesian War, with decidedly more conclusive results.
