= Myronides =

5th-century BC Athenian general

Myronides (Ancient Greek: Μυρωνίδης) was an Athenian general of the First Peloponnesian War. In 458 BC he defeated the Corinthians at Megara and then in 457 BC he defeated the Boeotians at the Battle of Oenophyta using a clever stratagem. Myronides' victory at Oenophyta led to a decade of Athenian domination over Boeotia, Locris and Phocis sometimes called the Athenian 'Land Empire'.

It has been debated, but it is unlikely he was the same Myronides who was sent to Sparta with Cimon and Xanthippus and who served as general at the Battle of Plataea.
