= 487th =

487th may refer to:

- 487th Air Expeditionary Wing, provisional United States Air Force unit assigned to the United States Air Forces in Europe
- 487th Bombardment Squadron, inactive United States Air Force unit
- 487th Fighter Squadron, inactive United States Air Force unit

== See also ==
- 487 (number)
- 487, the year 487 (CDLXXXVII) of the Julian calendar
- 487 BC
