= 445 BC =

445 BC in various calendars
Gregorian calendar	445 BC; CDXLV BC
Ab urbe condita	309
Ancient Egypt era	XXVII dynasty, 81
Pharaoh	Artaxerxes I of Persia, 21
Ancient Greek Olympiad (summer)	83rd Olympiad, year 4
Assyrian calendar	4306
Balinese saka calendar	N/A
Bengali calendar	−1038 – −1037
Berber calendar	506
Buddhist calendar	100
Burmese calendar	−1082
Byzantine calendar	5064–5065
Chinese calendar	乙未年 (Wood Goat); 2253 or 2046 — to — 丙申年 (Fire Monkey); 2254 or 2047
Coptic calendar	−728 – −727
Discordian calendar	722
Ethiopian calendar	−452 – −451
Hebrew calendar	3316–3317
- Hindu calendars
Vikram Samvat	−388 – −387
Shaka Samvat	N/A
Kali Yuga	2656–2657
Holocene calendar	9556
Iranian calendar	1066 BP – 1065 BP
Islamic calendar	1099 BH – 1098 BH
Javanese calendar	N/A
Julian calendar	N/A
Korean calendar	1889
Minguo calendar	2356 before ROC 民前2356年
Nanakshahi calendar	−1912
Thai solar calendar	98–99
Tibetan calendar	阴木羊年 (female Wood-Goat) −318 or −699 or −1471 — to — 阳火猴年 (male Fire-Monkey) −317 or −698 or −1470

Year 445 BC was a year of the pre-Julian Roman calendar. At the time, it was known as the Year of the Consulship of Augurinus and Philo (or, less frequently, year 309 Ab urbe condita). The denomination 445 BC for this year has been used since the early medieval period, when the Anno Domini calendar era became the prevalent method in Europe for naming years.

== Events ==
=== By place ===
==== Greece ====
- Pericles, concerned over the draining effect of years of war on Athenian manpower, looks for peace with the support of the Assembly. Athenian diplomat, Callias, goes to Sparta and after much bargaining arranges a peace treaty with Sparta and her Peloponnesian allies, thus extending the 5 year truce of 451 BC for another 30 years. According to this treaty, Megara is to be returned to the Peloponnesian League, Troezen and Achaea become independent, Aegina is to become a tributary to Athens but autonomous, and disputes are to be settled by arbitration. Each party agrees to respect the alliances of the other.

==== Roman Republic ====
- A new law, the Lex Canuleia removes the ban on inter-marriage of the Roman classes, i.e. plebeian with patrician.
- The Plebeians demand the right to stand for election as consul but the Roman senate refused to grant them this right. Ultimately, a compromise is reached, and consular command authority is granted to Consular Tribunes ("Military Tribunes with Consular powers" or tribuni militares consulari potestate).

== Births ==
- Approximate date – Antisthenes, Athenian philosopher (d. c.365 BC)
