= 545 BC =

545 BC in various calendars
- Gregorian calendar: 545 BC; DXLV BC
- Ab urbe condita: 209
- Ancient Egypt era: XXVI dynasty, 120
- Pharaoh: Amasis II, 26
- Ancient Greek Olympiad (summer): 58th Olympiad, year 4
- Assyrian calendar: 4206
- Balinese saka calendar: N/A
- Bengali calendar: −1138 – −1137
- Berber calendar: 406
- Buddhist calendar: 0
- Burmese calendar: −1182
- Byzantine calendar: 4964–4965
- Chinese calendar: 乙卯年 (Wood Rabbit); 2153 or 1946 — to — 丙辰年 (Fire Dragon); 2154 or 1947
- Coptic calendar: −828 – −827
- Discordian calendar: 622
- Ethiopian calendar: −552 – −551
- Hebrew calendar: 3216–3217
- Hindu calendars
- Vikram Samvat: −488 – −487
- Shaka Samvat: N/A
- Kali Yuga: 2556–2557
- Holocene calendar: 9456
- Iranian calendar: 1166 BP – 1165 BP
- Islamic calendar: 1202 BH – 1201 BH
- Javanese calendar: N/A
- Julian calendar: N/A
- Korean calendar: 1789
- Minguo calendar: 2456 before ROC 民前2456年
- Nanakshahi calendar: −2012
- Thai solar calendar: −2 – −1
- Tibetan calendar: ཤིང་མོ་ཡོས་ལོ་ (female Wood-Hare) −418 or −799 or −1571 — to — མེ་ཕོ་འབྲུག་ལོ་ (male Fire-Dragon) −417 or −798 or −1570

The year 545 BC was a year of the pre-Julian Roman calendar. In the Roman Empire, it was known as year 209 Ab urbe condita. The denomination 545 BC for this year has been used since the early medieval period, when the Anno Domini calendar era became the prevalent method in Europe for naming years.

In the Buddhist calendar, it corresponds to the year 0, traditionally the year when the Buddha reached parinirvana. However, different traditions disagree about the actual year 0, with many placing it in the following year 544 BC instead.

== Births ==
- Approximate date – Leotychides, king of Sparta (d. c.469 BC)

== Deaths ==
- King Kang of Chu, King of the State of Chu
- Zhou ling wang, King of the Zhou Dynasty of China.
