= 443 BC =

443 BC in various calendars
- Gregorian calendar: 443 BC; CDXLIII BC
- Ab urbe condita: 311
- Ancient Egypt era: XXVII dynasty, 83
- Pharaoh: Artaxerxes I of Persia, 23
- Ancient Greek Olympiad (summer): 84th Olympiad, year 2
- Assyrian calendar: 4308
- Balinese saka calendar: N/A
- Bengali calendar: −1036 – −1035
- Berber calendar: 508
- Buddhist calendar: 102
- Burmese calendar: −1080
- Byzantine calendar: 5066–5067
- Chinese calendar: 丁酉年 (Fire Rooster); 2255 or 2048 — to — 戊戌年 (Earth Dog); 2256 or 2049
- Coptic calendar: −726 – −725
- Discordian calendar: 724
- Ethiopian calendar: −450 – −449
- Hebrew calendar: 3318–3319
- Hindu calendars
- Vikram Samvat: −386 – −385
- Shaka Samvat: N/A
- Kali Yuga: 2658–2659
- Holocene calendar: 9558
- Iranian calendar: 1064 BP – 1063 BP
- Islamic calendar: 1097 BH – 1096 BH
- Javanese calendar: N/A
- Julian calendar: N/A
- Korean calendar: 1891
- Minguo calendar: 2354 before ROC 民前2354年
- Nanakshahi calendar: −1910
- Thai solar calendar: 100–101
- Tibetan calendar: མེ་མོ་བྱ་ལོ་ (female Fire-Bird) −316 or −697 or −1469 — to — ས་ཕོ་ཁྱི་ལོ་ (male Earth-Dog) −315 or −696 or −1468

Year 443 BC was a year of the pre-Julian Roman calendar. At the time, it was known as the Year of the Consulship of Macerinus and Barbatus (or, less frequently, year 311 Ab urbe condita). The denomination 443 BC for this year has been used since the early medieval period, when the Anno Domini calendar era became the prevalent method in Europe for naming years.

== Events ==
=== By place ===
==== Roman Republic ====
- No consuls are elected in Rome, but rather military tribunes with consular power are appointed in their stead. While only patricians could be consuls, some military tribunes were plebeians. These positions had responsibility for the census, a vital function in the financial administration of Rome. So to stop the plebeians from possibly gaining control of the census, the patricians remove from the consuls and tribunes the right to take the census, and rather entrust it to two magistrates, called censores who were to be chosen exclusively from the patricians in Rome.

==== Italy ====
- Pericles founds the colony of Thurii near the site of the former city of Sybaris, in southern Italy. Its colonists include Herodotus and Lysias.

== Deaths ==
- Duke Ligong of Qin, 22nd ruler of the Zhou dynasty
- Pindar, Greek poet (b. 522 BC)
