= 471 BC =

471 BC in various calendars
Gregorian calendar	471 BC; CDLXXI BC
Ab urbe condita	283
Ancient Egypt era	XXVII dynasty, 55
Pharaoh	Xerxes I of Persia, 15
Ancient Greek Olympiad (summer)	77th Olympiad, year 2
Assyrian calendar	4280
Balinese saka calendar	N/A
Bengali calendar	−1064 – −1063
Berber calendar	480
Buddhist calendar	74
Burmese calendar	−1108
Byzantine calendar	5038–5039
Chinese calendar	己巳年 (Earth Snake); 2227 or 2020 — to — 庚午年 (Metal Horse); 2228 or 2021
Coptic calendar	−754 – −753
Discordian calendar	696
Ethiopian calendar	−478 – −477
Hebrew calendar	3290–3291
- Hindu calendars
Vikram Samvat	−414 – −413
Shaka Samvat	N/A
Kali Yuga	2630–2631
Holocene calendar	9530
Iranian calendar	1092 BP – 1091 BP
Islamic calendar	1126 BH – 1125 BH
Javanese calendar	N/A
Julian calendar	N/A
Korean calendar	1863
Minguo calendar	2382 before ROC 民前2382年
Nanakshahi calendar	−1938
Thai solar calendar	72–73
Tibetan calendar	阴土蛇年 (female Earth-Snake) −344 or −725 or −1497 — to — 阳金马年 (male Iron-Horse) −343 or −724 or −1496

Year 471 BC was a year of the pre-Julian Roman calendar. At the time, it was known as the Year of the Consulship of Sabinus and Barbatus (or, less frequently, year 283 Ab urbe condita). The denomination 471 BC for this year has been used since the early medieval period, when the Anno Domini calendar era became the prevalent method in Europe for naming years.

== Events ==
=== By place ===
==== Greece ====
- Athenian politician Themistocles loses the confidence of the Athenian people, partly due to his arrogance and partly due to his alleged readiness to take bribes. As a result, he is ostracized and retires to Argos.
- The colony of Pixunte (Pixous) is founded in Magna Graecia.

== Births ==
- Thucydides, Greek historian (alleged date, however, 460 BC is more probable) (d. c. 395 BC)
