= 466 BC =

466 BC in various calendars
- Gregorian calendar: 466 BC; CDLXVI BC
- Ab urbe condita: 288
- Ancient Egypt era: XXVII dynasty, 60
- Pharaoh: Xerxes I of Persia, 20
- Ancient Greek Olympiad (summer): 78th Olympiad, year 3
- Assyrian calendar: 4285
- Balinese saka calendar: N/A
- Bengali calendar: −1059 – −1058
- Berber calendar: 485
- Buddhist calendar: 79
- Burmese calendar: −1103
- Byzantine calendar: 5043–5044
- Chinese calendar: 甲戌年 (Wood Dog); 2232 or 2025 — to — 乙亥年 (Wood Pig); 2233 or 2026
- Coptic calendar: −749 – −748
- Discordian calendar: 701
- Ethiopian calendar: −473 – −472
- Hebrew calendar: 3295–3296
- Hindu calendars
- Vikram Samvat: −409 – −408
- Shaka Samvat: N/A
- Kali Yuga: 2635–2636
- Holocene calendar: 9535
- Iranian calendar: 1087 BP – 1086 BP
- Islamic calendar: 1120 BH – 1119 BH
- Javanese calendar: N/A
- Julian calendar: N/A
- Korean calendar: 1868
- Minguo calendar: 2377 before ROC 民前2377年
- Nanakshahi calendar: −1933
- Thai solar calendar: 77–78
- Tibetan calendar: ཤིང་ཕོ་ཁྱི་ལོ་ (male Wood-Dog) −339 or −720 or −1492 — to — ཤིང་མོ་ཕག་ལོ་ (female Wood-Boar) −338 or −719 or −1491

Year 466 BC was a year of the pre-Julian Roman calendar. At the time, it was known as the Year of the Consulship of Priscus and Albinus (or, less frequently, year 288 Ab urbe condita). The denomination 466 BC for this year has been used since the early medieval period, when the Anno Domini calendar era became the prevalent method in Europe for naming years.

== Events ==
=== By place ===
==== Greece ====
- Cimon carries the war against Persia into Asia Minor and wins the Battle of the Eurymedon in Pamphylia. This is a decisive defeat of the Persians as Cimon's land and sea forces capture the Persian camp and destroy or capture the entire Persian fleet of 200 triremes (manned by Phoenicians). Many new allies of Athens are now recruited, such as the trading city of Phaselis on the Lycian-Pamphylian border.

==== Italy ====
- The Tyrant, Thrasybulus, is driven out by the citizens of Syracuse, Sicily. The city moves to a democratic system of government.
- The Greek colony of Taras, in Magna Graecia, is defeated by the native population of Apulia. As a result, the Tarentine monarchy falls, with the installation of a democracy.

== Deaths ==
- King Xerxes I of Persia.
