= 462 BC =

462 BC in various calendars
Gregorian calendar	462 BC; CDLXII BC
Ab urbe condita	292
Ancient Egypt era	XXVII dynasty, 64
Pharaoh	Artaxerxes I of Persia, 4
Ancient Greek Olympiad (summer)	79th Olympiad, year 3
Assyrian calendar	4289
Balinese saka calendar	N/A
Bengali calendar	−1055 – −1054
Berber calendar	489
Buddhist calendar	83
Burmese calendar	−1099
Byzantine calendar	5047–5048
Chinese calendar	戊寅年 (Earth Tiger); 2236 or 2029 — to — 己卯年 (Earth Rabbit); 2237 or 2030
Coptic calendar	−745 – −744
Discordian calendar	705
Ethiopian calendar	−469 – −468
Hebrew calendar	3299–3300
- Hindu calendars
Vikram Samvat	−405 – −404
Shaka Samvat	N/A
Kali Yuga	2639–2640
Holocene calendar	9539
Iranian calendar	1083 BP – 1082 BP
Islamic calendar	1116 BH – 1115 BH
Javanese calendar	N/A
Julian calendar	N/A
Korean calendar	1872
Minguo calendar	2373 before ROC 民前2373年
Nanakshahi calendar	−1929
Thai solar calendar	81–82
Tibetan calendar	阳土虎年 (male Earth-Tiger) −335 or −716 or −1488 — to — 阴土兔年 (female Earth-Rabbit) −334 or −715 or −1487

Year 462 BC was a year of the pre-Julian Roman calendar. At the time, it was known as the Year of the Consulship of Tricipitinus and Cicurinus (or, less frequently, year 292 Ab urbe condita). The denomination 462 BC for this year has been used since the early medieval period, when the Anno Domini calendar era became the prevalent method in Europe for naming years.

== Events ==
=== By place ===
==== Greece ====
- The Spartans try to conquer the mountain stronghold of Mt Ithome in Messenia, where a large force of rebellious helots have taken refuge. They ask their allies from the Persian Wars, including the Athenians, to help.
- Kimon seeks the support of Athens' citizens providing help to Sparta. Although Ephialtes maintains that Sparta is Athens' rival for power and should be left to fend for itself, Kimon's view prevails. Kimon then leads 4,000 hoplites to Mount Ithome.
- After an attempt to storm Mt. Ithome fails, the Spartans start to distrust the Athenians over concerns that they may take the side of the helots. Retaining their other allies, the Spartans sent Kimon and his men home. This insulting rebuff causes the collapse of Kimon's popularity at Athens. Outrage over the dismissal swings Athenian opinion towards Ephialtes' views.
- Ephialtes passes a law in the Athenian ecclesia, which reforms the Areopagus, limiting its power to judging cases of homicide and religious crimes. He considers the Areopagus to be the centre of conservatism and Ephialtes' victory is seen as a defeat for the conservatives and the members of the oligarchy.
- Argos, taking advantage of Spartan preoccupation with the revolt of its helots, finally conquers Mycenae. The inhabitants of the town are dispersed, with some finding their way into Macedonia.
- Pericles starts to effectively be the leader of Athens.

=== By topic ===
==== Philosophy ====
- The Greek philosopher, Anaxagoras, moves to Athens and begins teaching there.
