= 447 BC =

447 BC in various calendars
Gregorian calendar	447 BC; CDXLVII BC
Ab urbe condita	307
Ancient Egypt era	XXVII dynasty, 79
Pharaoh	Artaxerxes I of Persia, 19
Ancient Greek Olympiad (summer)	83rd Olympiad, year 2
Assyrian calendar	4304
Balinese saka calendar	N/A
Bengali calendar	−1040 – −1039
Berber calendar	504
Buddhist calendar	98
Burmese calendar	−1084
Byzantine calendar	5062–5063
Chinese calendar	癸巳年 (Water Snake); 2251 or 2044 — to — 甲午年 (Wood Horse); 2252 or 2045
Coptic calendar	−730 – −729
Discordian calendar	720
Ethiopian calendar	−454 – −453
Hebrew calendar	3314–3315
- Hindu calendars
Vikram Samvat	−390 – −389
Shaka Samvat	N/A
Kali Yuga	2654–2655
Holocene calendar	9554
Iranian calendar	1068 BP – 1067 BP
Islamic calendar	1101 BH – 1100 BH
Javanese calendar	N/A
Julian calendar	N/A
Korean calendar	1887
Minguo calendar	2358 before ROC 民前2358年
Nanakshahi calendar	−1914
Thai solar calendar	96–97
Tibetan calendar	阴水蛇年 (female Water-Snake) −320 or −701 or −1473 — to — 阳木马年 (male Wood-Horse) −319 or −700 or −1472

Year 447 BC was a year of the pre-Julian Roman calendar. At the time, it was known as the Year of the Consulship of Macerinus and Iullus (or, less frequently, year 307 Ab urbe condita). The denomination 447 BC for this year has been used since the early medieval period, when the Anno Domini calendar era became the prevalent method in Europe for naming years.

== Events ==
=== By place ===
==== Greece ====
- Pericles leads Athenian forces in the expulsion of barbarians from the Thracian peninsula of Gallipoli, in order to establish Athenian colonists in the region. Thus Pericles starts a policy of cleruchy (klerouchos) or "out-settlements". This is a form of colonisation where poor and unemployed people are assisted to emigrate to new regions.
- A revolt breaks out in Boeotia as the oligarchs of Thebes conspire against the democratic faction in the city. The Athenians, under their general Tolmides, with 1000 hoplites plus other troops from their allies, march into Boeotia to take back the towns revolting against Athenian control. They capture Chaeronea, but are attacked and defeated by the Boeotians at Coronea. As a result, the Athenians are forced to give up control of Boeotia as well as Phocis and Locris, which all fall under the control of hostile oligarchs who quit the Delian League.
- The middle component of the Long Walls from Athens to the port of Piraeus is completed.

=== By subject ===
==== Literature ====
- Achaeus of Eretria, a Greek playwright, produces his first play.

==== Architecture ====
- Pericles commissions the architects Kallikrates and Iktinos to design a larger temple for the Parthenon and the construction begins on rebuilding the great temple of Athena (the Parthenon) on the Acropolis at Athens soon afterwards.
