= 469 BC =

469 BC in various calendars
- Gregorian calendar: 469 BC; CDLXIX BC
- Ab urbe condita: 285
- Ancient Egypt era: XXVII dynasty, 57
- Pharaoh: Xerxes I of Persia, 17
- Ancient Greek Olympiad (summer): 77th Olympiad, year 4
- Assyrian calendar: 4282
- Balinese saka calendar: N/A
- Bengali calendar: −1062 – −1061
- Berber calendar: 482
- Buddhist calendar: 76
- Burmese calendar: −1106
- Byzantine calendar: 5040–5041
- Chinese calendar: 辛未年 (Metal Goat); 2229 or 2022 — to — 壬申年 (Water Monkey); 2230 or 2023
- Coptic calendar: −752 – −751
- Discordian calendar: 698
- Ethiopian calendar: −476 – −475
- Hebrew calendar: 3292–3293
- Hindu calendars
- Vikram Samvat: −412 – −411
- Shaka Samvat: N/A
- Kali Yuga: 2632–2633
- Holocene calendar: 9532
- Iranian calendar: 1090 BP – 1089 BP
- Islamic calendar: 1123 BH – 1122 BH
- Javanese calendar: N/A
- Julian calendar: N/A
- Korean calendar: 1865
- Minguo calendar: 2380 before ROC 民前2380年
- Nanakshahi calendar: −1936
- Thai solar calendar: 74–75
- Tibetan calendar: ལྕགས་མོ་ལུག་ལོ་ (female Iron-Sheep) −342 or −723 or −1495 — to — ཆུ་ཕོ་སྤྲེ་ལོ་ (male Water-Monkey) −341 or −722 or −1494

Year 469 BC was a year of the pre-Julian Roman calendar. At the time, it was known as the Year of the Consulship of Priscus and Caeliomontanus (or, less frequently, year 285 Ab urbe condita). The denomination 469 BC for this year has been used since the early medieval period, when the Anno Domini calendar era became the prevalent method in Europe for naming years.

== Events ==
=== By place ===
==== Greece ====
- The island of Naxos wishes to secede from the Delian League, but is blockaded by Athens and forced to surrender. Naxos becomes a tribute-paying member of the Delian League. This action is considered high-handed and resented by the other Greek city states.
- Themistocles, after being exiled from Athens, makes his way across the Aegean to Magnesia, an inland Ionian city under Persian rule.

== Births ==
- Socrates, Athenian philosopher (approximate date) (d. 399 BC)

== Deaths ==
- King Yuan of Zhou (Ji Ren), 27th king of the Zhou dynasty of China
- Duke Chu of Wey, 30th and 33rd ruler of state of Wey
- Leotychides, king of Sparta (b. c.545 BC)
