= 461 BC =

461 BC in various calendars
Gregorian calendar	461 BC; CDLXI BC
Ab urbe condita	293
Ancient Egypt era	XXVII dynasty, 65
Pharaoh	Artaxerxes I of Persia, 5
Ancient Greek Olympiad (summer)	79th Olympiad, year 4
Assyrian calendar	4290
Balinese saka calendar	N/A
Bengali calendar	−1054 – −1053
Berber calendar	490
Buddhist calendar	84
Burmese calendar	−1098
Byzantine calendar	5048–5049
Chinese calendar	己卯年 (Earth Rabbit); 2237 or 2030 — to — 庚辰年 (Metal Dragon); 2238 or 2031
Coptic calendar	−744 – −743
Discordian calendar	706
Ethiopian calendar	−468 – −467
Hebrew calendar	3300–3301
- Hindu calendars
Vikram Samvat	−404 – −403
Shaka Samvat	N/A
Kali Yuga	2640–2641
Holocene calendar	9540
Iranian calendar	1082 BP – 1081 BP
Islamic calendar	1115 BH – 1114 BH
Javanese calendar	N/A
Julian calendar	N/A
Korean calendar	1873
Minguo calendar	2372 before ROC 民前2372年
Nanakshahi calendar	−1928
Thai solar calendar	82–83
Tibetan calendar	阴土兔年 (female Earth-Rabbit) −334 or −715 or −1487 — to — 阳金龙年 (male Iron-Dragon) −333 or −714 or −1486

Year 461 BC was a year of the pre-Julian Roman calendar. At the time, it was known as the Year of the Consulship of Gallus and Cornutus (or, less frequently, year 293 Ab urbe condita). The denomination 461 BC for this year has been used since the early medieval period, when the Anno Domini calendar era became the prevalent method in Europe for naming years.

== Events ==
=== By place ===
==== Greece ====
- In Athens, Ephialtes and Pericles finally get agreement to the ostracism of Kimon, who had become unpopular for his unsuccessful pro-Spartan policy.
- Ephialtes, with the support of Pericles, reduces the power of the Athenian Council of Areopagus (filled with ex-archons and so a stronghold of oligarchy) and transfers them to the people, i.e. the Council of Five Hundred, the Assembly and the popular law courts. The office of Judge is made a paid position and is recruited by lot from a list to which every citizen can have his name added.
- Ephialtes is murdered by Aristodicus of Tanagra in Boeotia, who is said to have acted on behalf of members of the Athenian oligarchy.
- The ostracism of Kimon and the murder of Ephialtes leave Pericles as the most influential orator in Athens.

== Deaths ==
- Ephialtes, leader of the radical democrats in Athens (assassinated)
