= 439 BC =

439 BC in various calendars
Gregorian calendar	439 BC; CDXXXIX BC
Ab urbe condita	315
Ancient Egypt era	XXVII dynasty, 87
Pharaoh	Artaxerxes I of Persia, 27
Ancient Greek Olympiad (summer)	85th Olympiad, year 2
Assyrian calendar	4312
Balinese saka calendar	N/A
Bengali calendar	−1032 – −1031
Berber calendar	512
Buddhist calendar	106
Burmese calendar	−1076
Byzantine calendar	5070–5071
Chinese calendar	辛丑年 (Metal Ox); 2259 or 2052 — to — 壬寅年 (Water Tiger); 2260 or 2053
Coptic calendar	−722 – −721
Discordian calendar	728
Ethiopian calendar	−446 – −445
Hebrew calendar	3322–3323
- Hindu calendars
Vikram Samvat	−382 – −381
Shaka Samvat	N/A
Kali Yuga	2662–2663
Holocene calendar	9562
Iranian calendar	1060 BP – 1059 BP
Islamic calendar	1093 BH – 1092 BH
Javanese calendar	N/A
Julian calendar	N/A
Korean calendar	1895
Minguo calendar	2350 before ROC 民前2350年
Nanakshahi calendar	−1906
Thai solar calendar	104–105
Tibetan calendar	ལྕགས་མོ་གླང་ལོ་ (female Iron-Ox) −312 or −693 or −1465 — to — ཆུ་ཕོ་སྟག་ལོ་ (male Water-Tiger) −311 or −692 or −1464

Year 439 BC was a year of the pre-Julian Roman calendar. At the time, it was known as the Year of the Consulship of Lanatus and Barbatus (or, less frequently, year 315 Ab urbe condita). The denomination 439 BC for this year has been used since the early medieval period, when the Anno Domini calendar era became the prevalent method in Europe for naming years.

== Events ==
=== By place ===
==== Greece ====
- As a result of Persian assistance to Samos, it takes the Athenian army nine months to successfully complete its siege of Samos and force the Samians to surrender. Samos becomes a tributary of Athens.

==== Roman Republic ====
- Spurius Maelius, a wealthy Roman plebeian, tries to buy popular support with the aim of making himself king. During the severe famine affecting Rome, he buys up a large store of grain and sells it at a low price to the people of Rome – the first time this had been done in Rome. This leads Lucius Minucius, the patrician praefectus annonae ("president of the market"), to accuse Maelius of seeking to take over the government.
- Lucius Quinctius Cincinnatus is made dictator of the Roman Republic for a second time to deal with the Maelius controversy. He appoints Gaius Servilius Ahala as his Master of the Horse.
- Maelius is summoned before Cincinnatus but refuses to appear. Shortly thereafter, Maelius is killed by Gaius Servilius Ahala and his house is burnt to the ground.

== Deaths ==
- Spurius Maelius - was the youngest man to ever attempt taking over Rome
