= 483 BC =

483 BC in various calendars
| Gregorian calendar | 483 BC; CDLXXXIII BC |
| Ab urbe condita | 271 |
| Ancient Egypt era | XXVII dynasty, 43 |
| Pharaoh | Xerxes I of Persia, 3 |
| Ancient Greek Olympiad (summer) | 74th Olympiad, year 2 |
| Assyrian calendar | 4268 |
| Balinese saka calendar | N/A |
| Bengali calendar | −1076 – −1075 |
| Berber calendar | 468 |
| Buddhist calendar | 62 |
| Burmese calendar | −1120 |
| Byzantine calendar | 5026–5027 |
| Chinese calendar | 丁巳年 (Fire Snake); 2215 or 2008 — to — 戊午年 (Earth Horse); 2216 or 2009 |
| Coptic calendar | −766 – −765 |
| Discordian calendar | 684 |
| Ethiopian calendar | −490 – −489 |
| Hebrew calendar | 3278–3279 |
- Hindu calendars
| Vikram Samvat | −426 – −425 |
| Shaka Samvat | N/A |
| Kali Yuga | 2618–2619 |
| Holocene calendar | 9518 |
| Iranian calendar | 1104 BP – 1103 BP |
| Islamic calendar | 1138 BH – 1137 BH |
| Javanese calendar | N/A |
| Julian calendar | N/A |
| Korean calendar | 1851 |
| Minguo calendar | 2394 before ROC 民前2394年 |
| Nanakshahi calendar | −1950 |
| Thai solar calendar | 60–61 |
| Tibetan calendar | མེ་མོ་སྦྲུལ་ལོ་ (female Fire-Snake) −356 or −737 or −1509 — to — ས་ཕོ་རྟ་ལོ་ (male Earth-Horse) −355 or −736 or −1508 |

Year 483 BC was a year of the pre-Julian Roman calendar. At the time, it was known as the Year of the Consulship of Vibulanus and Potitus (or, less frequently, year 271 Ab urbe condita). The denomination 483 BC for this year has been used since the early medieval period, when the Anno Domini calendar era became the prevalent method in Europe for naming years.

== Events ==
=== By place ===
==== Persian empire ====
- Xerxes I of Persia is encouraged by his cousin and brother-in-law, Mardonius, supported by a strong party of exiled Greeks, to take revenge for the defeat that Darius I suffered at the hands of the Greeks at Marathon in 490 BC. In response, Xerxes prepares for a major expedition to crush the Greeks. To avoid a repeat of the significant losses to the Persian fleet that occurred in 492 BC, Xerxes has a canal cut through the promontory of Mount Athos.

==== Greece ====
- The Athenian archon Themistocles realises that the Greeks need to be able to beat the Persians at sea. To carry out this strategy, however, Athens needs far more warships (that is to say the newly developed, specialised triremes) than the 70 it has. Themistocles is initially opposed by other Athenian leaders. However, when the state-owned silver mines at Laurium become the site of a rich strike, Themistocles persuades the assembly, instead of "declaring a dividend," to devote the whole surplus to increasing the navy to a proposed 200 ships.

==== India ====
- Following the death of Gautama Buddha, the relics associated with his cremation were divided amongst royal families and his disciples, then interned in 8 reliquaries. Each reliquary was then encased in its own burial mound, called a stupa (approximate date).

==== Sicily ====
- Gelo, the tyrant of Syracuse conquers the nearby Sicilian cities of Euboea and Megara Hyblaea, selling their common people into slavery and bringing their oligarchs to Syracuse.

==== Rome ====
- Commencement of the Fabian war with Veii.
- Ongoing hostilities with the Volsci.
- Punishment of the vestal virgin Oppia for a breach of chastity.

== Deaths ==
- Gautama Buddha, Indian prince, founder of Buddhism (b. c. 563 BC)
