= 499 BC =

499 BC in various calendars
- Gregorian calendar: 499 BC; CDXCIX BC
- Ab urbe condita: 255
- Ancient Egypt era: XXVII dynasty, 27
- Pharaoh: Darius I of Persia, 23
- Ancient Greek Olympiad (summer): 70th Olympiad, year 2
- Assyrian calendar: 4252
- Balinese saka calendar: N/A
- Bengali calendar: −1092 – −1091
- Berber calendar: 452
- Buddhist calendar: 46
- Burmese calendar: −1136
- Byzantine calendar: 5010–5011
- Chinese calendar: 辛丑年 (Metal Ox); 2199 or 1992 — to — 壬寅年 (Water Tiger); 2200 or 1993
- Coptic calendar: −782 – −781
- Discordian calendar: 668
- Ethiopian calendar: −506 – −505
- Hebrew calendar: 3262–3263
- Hindu calendars
- Vikram Samvat: −442 – −441
- Shaka Samvat: N/A
- Kali Yuga: 2602–2603
- Holocene calendar: 9502
- Iranian calendar: 1120 BP – 1119 BP
- Islamic calendar: 1154 BH – 1153 BH
- Javanese calendar: N/A
- Julian calendar: N/A
- Korean calendar: 1835
- Minguo calendar: 2410 before ROC 民前2410年
- Nanakshahi calendar: −1966
- Thai solar calendar: 44–45
- Tibetan calendar: ལྕགས་མོ་གླང་ལོ་ (female Iron-Ox) −372 or −753 or −1525 — to — ཆུ་ཕོ་སྟག་ལོ་ (male Water-Tiger) −371 or −752 or −1524

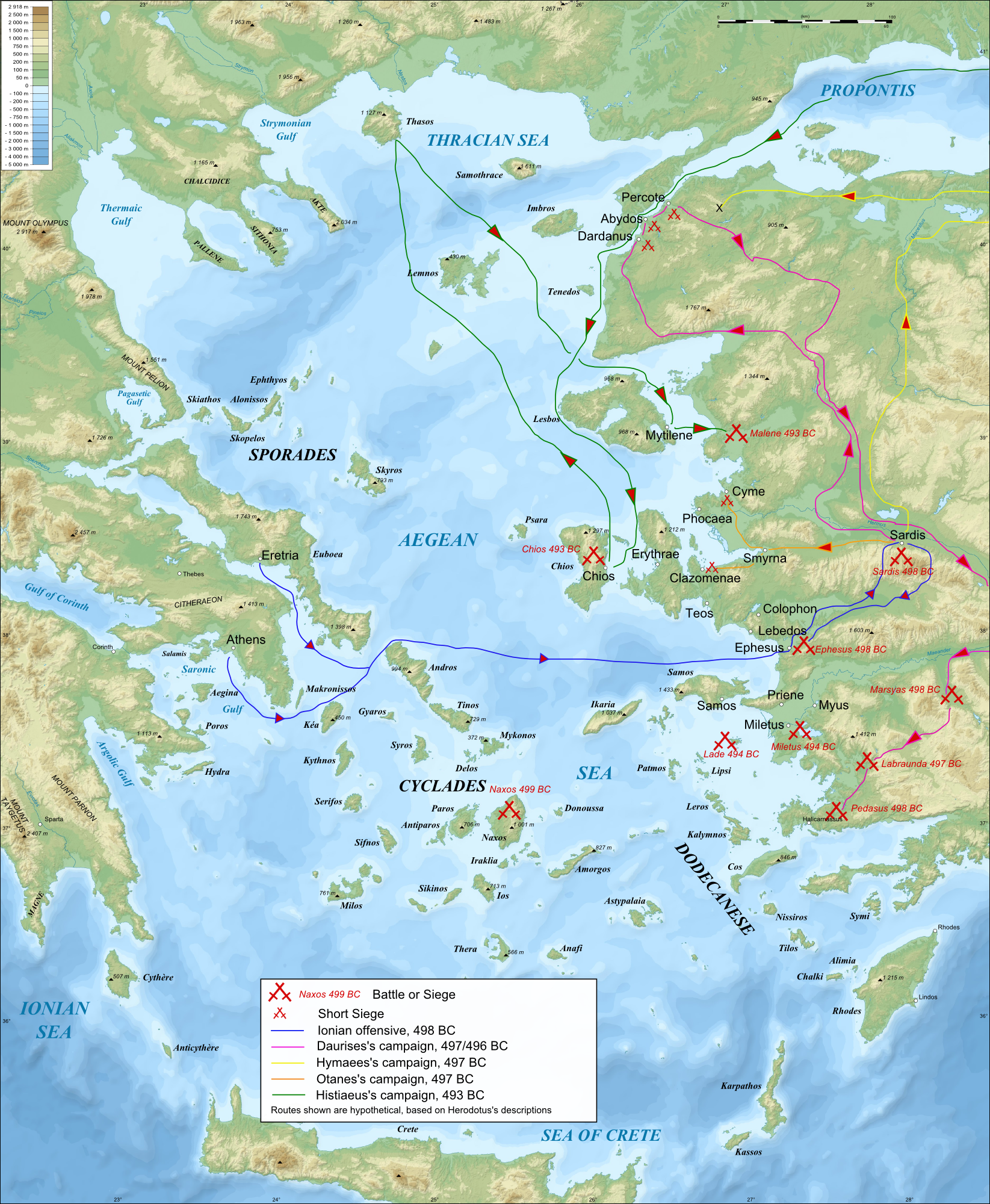
Main events of the Ionian Revolt

Year 499 BC was a year of the pre-Julian Roman calendar. In the Roman Empire, it was known as the Year of the Consulship of Aebutius and Cicurinus (or, less frequently, year 255 Ab urbe condita). The denomination 499 BC for this year has been used since the early medieval period, when the Anno Domini calendar era became the prevalent method in Europe for naming years.

== Events ==
=== By place ===
==== Greece ====
- After a failed attack on the rebellious island of Naxos in c. 501 BC (on behalf of the Persians), Aristagoras, tyrant of Miletus, to save himself from the wrath of Persia, plans a revolt with the Milesians and the other Ionians. With the encouragement of Histiaeus (his father-in-law and former tyrant of Miletus), Aristagoras induces the Ionian cities of Asia Minor to revolt against Persia, thus instigating the Ionian Revolt and beginning the Greco-Persian Wars between Greece and Persia. The pro-Persian tyrant of Mytilene is stoned to death.
- Miltiades the Younger, the ruler of the Thracian Chersonese, which has been under Persian suzerainty since approximately 514 BC, joins the Ionian revolt. He seizes the islands of Lemnos and Imbros from the Persians.
- Aristagoras seeks help with the revolt against the Persians from Cleomenes I, king of Sparta, but the Spartans are unwilling to respond.
