= 459 BC =

459 BC in various calendars
- Gregorian calendar: 459 BC; CDLIX BC
- Ab urbe condita: 295
- Ancient Egypt era: XXVII dynasty, 67
- Pharaoh: Artaxerxes I of Persia, 7
- Ancient Greek Olympiad (summer): 80th Olympiad, year 2
- Assyrian calendar: 4292
- Balinese saka calendar: N/A
- Bengali calendar: −1052 – −1051
- Berber calendar: 492
- Buddhist calendar: 86
- Burmese calendar: −1096
- Byzantine calendar: 5050–5051
- Chinese calendar: 辛巳年 (Metal Snake); 2239 or 2032 — to — 壬午年 (Water Horse); 2240 or 2033
- Coptic calendar: −742 – −741
- Discordian calendar: 708
- Ethiopian calendar: −466 – −465
- Hebrew calendar: 3302–3303
- Hindu calendars
- Vikram Samvat: −402 – −401
- Shaka Samvat: N/A
- Kali Yuga: 2642–2643
- Holocene calendar: 9542
- Iranian calendar: 1080 BP – 1079 BP
- Islamic calendar: 1113 BH – 1112 BH
- Javanese calendar: N/A
- Julian calendar: N/A
- Korean calendar: 1875
- Minguo calendar: 2370 before ROC 民前2370年
- Nanakshahi calendar: −1926
- Thai solar calendar: 84–85
- Tibetan calendar: ལྕགས་མོ་སྦྲུལ་ལོ་ (female Iron-Snake) −332 or −713 or −1485 — to — ཆུ་ཕོ་རྟ་ལོ་ (male Water-Horse) −331 or −712 or −1484

Year 459 BC was a year of the pre-Julian Roman calendar. At the time, it was known as the Year of the Consulship of Vibulanus and Uritinus (or, less frequently, year 295 Ab urbe condita). The denomination 459 BC for this year has been used since the early medieval period, when the Anno Domini calendar era became the prevalent method in Europe for naming years.

== Events ==
=== By place ===
==== Greece ====
- Athens allied itself with the city state of Megara which was under pressure from Corinth. This alliance leads to war between Corinth and Athens. The first battle of the war, at Haliesis in the Gulf of Argolis, resulted in a Corinthian victory, but the next battle, the battle of Cecryphalea (modern Angistrion), went Athens' way.

==== Roman Republic ====
- The Aequi occupied Tusculum. In response to the threat, the Roman Senate decided to send an army to help the allied city, under the command of consul Lucius Cornelius Maluginensis. In addition, the consul Fabius Vibulanus, who was at that point besieging Antium, moved his forces to attack Tusculum. The Tusculans were able to recapture their city. A truce was then arranged with the Aequi.

==== Sicily ====
- The Sicilian town of Morgantina was destroyed by Ducetius, Hellenised leader of the Siculi (according to Diodorus Siculus).
