= 457 BC =

457 BC in various calendars
- Gregorian calendar: 457 BC; CDLVII BC
- Ab urbe condita: 297
- Ancient Egypt era: XXVII dynasty, 69
- Pharaoh: Artaxerxes I of Persia, 9
- Ancient Greek Olympiad (summer): 80th Olympiad, year 4
- Assyrian calendar: 4294
- Balinese saka calendar: N/A
- Bengali calendar: −1050 – −1049
- Berber calendar: 494
- Buddhist calendar: 88
- Burmese calendar: −1094
- Byzantine calendar: 5052–5053
- Chinese calendar: 癸未年 (Water Goat); 2241 or 2034 — to — 甲申年 (Wood Monkey); 2242 or 2035
- Coptic calendar: −740 – −739
- Discordian calendar: 710
- Ethiopian calendar: −464 – −463
- Hebrew calendar: 3304–3305
- Hindu calendars
- Vikram Samvat: −400 – −399
- Shaka Samvat: N/A
- Kali Yuga: 2644–2645
- Holocene calendar: 9544
- Iranian calendar: 1078 BP – 1077 BP
- Islamic calendar: 1111 BH – 1110 BH
- Javanese calendar: N/A
- Julian calendar: N/A
- Korean calendar: 1877
- Minguo calendar: 2368 before ROC 民前2368年
- Nanakshahi calendar: −1924
- Thai solar calendar: 86–87
- Tibetan calendar: ཆུ་མོ་ལུག་ལོ་ (female Water-Sheep) −330 or −711 or −1483 — to — ཤིང་ཕོ་སྤྲེ་ལོ་ (male Wood-Monkey) −329 or −710 or −1482

Year 457 BC was a year of the pre-Julian Roman calendar. At the time, it was known as the Year of the Consulship of Pulvillus and Augurinus or Cincinnatus and Vibulanus (or, less frequently, year 297 Ab urbe condita). The denomination 457 BC for this year has been used since the early medieval period, when the Anno Domini calendar era became the prevalent method in Europe for naming years.

== Events ==
=== By place ===
==== Greece ====
- Athens, the leader of the Delian League, comes into conflict with Corinth and its ally Sparta (leader of the Peloponnesian League) over Megara. Nicomedes of Sparta, regent for King Pleistoanax, leads an army of 11,500 hoplites into Boeotia to help Thebes put down a rebellion by Phocis.
- Athenian forces block the routes back to the Peloponnese, so the Spartans decide to remain in Boeotia and await the Athenian attack. The Athenians and their allies, with 14,000 men under the command of Myronides, meet the Spartans at Battle of Tanagra. The Spartans win the battle, but they lose many men and so are unable to follow up on their victory.
- The Athenians regroup after the battle and march into Boeotia. Led by Myronides, the Athenians defeat the Boeotians in the Battle of Oenophyta, and then destroy the walls of Tanagra and ravage Locris and Phocis.
- Athens goes on to defeat Aegina later in the year, and to finish the construction of the Long Walls to the Athenian port of Piraeus (an action opposed by Sparta).
- Boeotia, Phocis and Opuntian Locris become members of the Delian League. Athens now has enrolled in the Delian League all the Boeotian cities except Thebes. Aegina is forced to become a member of the League. It is assessed, with Thasos, for a yearly contribution to the League of 30 talents.
- The Zeus Temple at Olympia is completed. The forty-foot statue of Zeus inside it becomes one of the Seven Wonders of the Ancient World.
