= 444 BC =

444 BC in various calendars
Gregorian calendar	444 BC; CDXLIV BC
Ab urbe condita	310
Ancient Egypt era	XXVII dynasty, 82
Pharaoh	Artaxerxes I of Persia, 22
Ancient Greek Olympiad (summer)	84th Olympiad (victor)¹
Assyrian calendar	4307
Balinese saka calendar	N/A
Bengali calendar	−1037 – −1036
Berber calendar	507
Buddhist calendar	101
Burmese calendar	−1081
Byzantine calendar	5065–5066
Chinese calendar	丙申年 (Fire Monkey); 2254 or 2047 — to — 丁酉年 (Fire Rooster); 2255 or 2048
Coptic calendar	−727 – −726
Discordian calendar	723
Ethiopian calendar	−451 – −450
Hebrew calendar	3317–3318
- Hindu calendars
Vikram Samvat	−387 – −386
Shaka Samvat	N/A
Kali Yuga	2657–2658
Holocene calendar	9557
Iranian calendar	1065 BP – 1064 BP
Islamic calendar	1098 BH – 1097 BH
Javanese calendar	N/A
Julian calendar	N/A
Korean calendar	1890
Minguo calendar	2355 before ROC 民前2355年
Nanakshahi calendar	−1911
Thai solar calendar	99–100
Tibetan calendar	阳火猴年 (male Fire-Monkey) −317 or −698 or −1470 — to — 阴火鸡年 (female Fire-Rooster) −316 or −697 or −1469

Year 444 BC was a year of the pre-Julian Roman calendar. At the time, it was known as the Year of the Tribunate of Atratinus, Siculus and Luscus and the Year of the Consulship of Mugillanus and Atratinus (or, less frequently, year 310 Ab urbe condita). The denomination 444 BC for this year has been used since the early medieval period, when the Anno Domini calendar era became the prevalent method in Europe for naming years.

== Events ==
=== By place ===
==== Greece ====
- The conservative and democratic factions in Athens confront each other. The ambitious new leader of the conservatives, Thucydides, accuses the leader of the democratic faction, Pericles, of profligacy and criticises the way Pericles is spending money on his ambitious building plans for the city. Thucydides manages, initially, to gain the support of the ecclesia. Pericles responds by proposing to reimburse the city for all the expenses from his private property, on the condition that he would make the inscriptions of dedication in his own name. His stance is supported by the ecclesia, so Thucydides' efforts to dislodge Pericles from power are defeated.

==== Persian empire ====
- Nehemiah, the Jewish cupbearer to Artaxerxes I at Susa, is given permission by Artaxerxes to return to Jerusalem as governor of Judea, in order to rebuild parts of it.

== Deaths ==
- Udayin, king of Magadha in ancient India.
