= 491 BC =

491 BC in various calendars
- Gregorian calendar: 491 BC; CDXCI BC
- Ab urbe condita: 263
- Ancient Egypt era: XXVII dynasty, 35
- Pharaoh: Darius I of Persia, 31
- Ancient Greek Olympiad (summer): 72nd Olympiad, year 2
- Assyrian calendar: 4260
- Balinese saka calendar: N/A
- Bengali calendar: −1084 – −1083
- Berber calendar: 460
- Buddhist calendar: 54
- Burmese calendar: −1128
- Byzantine calendar: 5018–5019
- Chinese calendar: 己酉年 (Earth Rooster); 2207 or 2000 — to — 庚戌年 (Metal Dog); 2208 or 2001
- Coptic calendar: −774 – −773
- Discordian calendar: 676
- Ethiopian calendar: −498 – −497
- Hebrew calendar: 3270–3271
- Hindu calendars
- Vikram Samvat: −434 – −433
- Shaka Samvat: N/A
- Kali Yuga: 2610–2611
- Holocene calendar: 9510
- Iranian calendar: 1112 BP – 1111 BP
- Islamic calendar: 1146 BH – 1145 BH
- Javanese calendar: N/A
- Julian calendar: N/A
- Korean calendar: 1843
- Minguo calendar: 2402 before ROC 民前2402年
- Nanakshahi calendar: −1958
- Thai solar calendar: 52–53
- Tibetan calendar: ས་མོ་བྱ་ལོ་ (female Earth-Bird) −364 or −745 or −1517 — to — ལྕགས་ཕོ་ཁྱི་ལོ་ (male Iron-Dog) −363 or −744 or −1516

Year 491 BC was a year of the pre-Julian Roman calendar. At the time, it was known as the Year of the Consulship of Augurinus and Atratinus (or, less frequently, year 263 Ab urbe condita). The denomination 491 BC for this year has been used since the early medieval period, when the Anno Domini calendar era became the prevalent method in Europe for naming years.

== Events ==
=== By place ===
==== Greece ====
- Darius I sends envoys to all Greek cities, demanding "earth and water for vassalage" which Athens and Sparta refuse.
- The Greek city of Aegina, fearing the loss of trade, submits to Persia. The Spartan king, Cleomenes I tries to punish Aegina for its submission to the Persians, but the other Spartan king, Demaratus, thwarts him.
- Cleomenes I engineers the deposing of Spartan co-ruler Demaratus (and his replacement by Cleomenes’ cousin Leotychidas) by bribing the oracle at Delphi to announce that this action was divine will. The two Spartan kings successfully capture the Persian collaborators in Aegina.

==== Sicily ====
- Hippocrates, tyrant of Gela, loses his life in a battle against the Siculi, the native Sicilian people. He is succeeded as Tyrant of Gela by Gelo, who had been his commander of cavalry.

==== Roman Republic ====
- During this year there was a famine in Rome. General Gais Marcius Coriolanus suggested that people should not receive grains unless they agree to abolish the Office of Tribune. Because of this, the Tribunes had him exiled. In response, Coriolanus takes refuge with the leader of the Volsci, eventually leading the Volscian army in a war against Rome. It was only due to entreaties from his mother and wife that he abandoned his war against Rome.
- On the Via Latina, a main road leading out of Rome, the Temple of Fortuna Muliebras was finished.

=== By topic ===
==== Art ====
- The construction of a relief begins in the Apadana, a ceremonial complex at Persepolis. The relief pictures Darius I and Xerxes I receiving tribute and is now displayed in the Oriental Institute of the University of Chicago.

== Deaths ==
- Hippocrates, tyrant of Gela
