= Agatharchus =

5th-century BC Greek artist

Agatharchus or Agatharch (Ancient Greek: Ἀγάθαρχος) was a self-taught painter from Samos, who lived in the 5th century BC. His father was named Eudemos (Εὔδημος). He is said by Vitruvius to have invented scenic painting, and to have painted a scene (scenam fecit) for a tragedy which Aeschylus exhibited. Hence some writers, such as Karl Woermann, have supposed that he introduced perspective and illusionism into painting.

However, as this appears to contradict Aristotle's assertion that scenic painting was introduced by Sophocles, some scholars understand Vitruvius to mean merely that Agatharchus constructed a stage. But the context shows clearly that perspective painting must be meant, for Vitruvius goes on to say that Democritus and Anaxagoras, carrying out the principles laid down in a treatise written by Agatharchus, wrote on the same subject, showing how, in drawing, the lines ought to be made to correspond, according to a natural proportion, to the figure which would be traced out on an imaginary intervening plane by a pencil of rays proceeding from the eye, as a fixed point of sight, to the several points of the object viewed.

It was probably not till towards the end of Aeschylus's career that scenic painting was introduced, and not till the time of Sophocles that it was generally made use of, which may account for what Aristotle says.

Agatharchus was therefore the first painter known to have used graphical perspective on a large scale, although rare occurrences of perspective do appear in vase painting around the middle of the 6th century BC. He is also said to have led the way for later painters, such as Apollodorus.

Agatharchus was a contemporary of Alcibiades and Zeuxis, and was often singled out for the ease and rapidity with which he finished his works. Plutarch and Andocides at greater length tell an anecdote of Alcibiades having inveigled Agatharchus to his house and kept him there for more than three months in strict durance, compelling him to paint it. The speech of Andocides above referred to seems to have been delivered after the destruction of Melos (416 BC) and before the expedition to Sicily (415 BC); so that from the above data the age of Agatharchus may be accurately fixed.
