= 409 BC =

409 BC in various calendars
- Gregorian calendar: 409 BC; CDIX BC
- Ab urbe condita: 345
- Ancient Egypt era: XXVII dynasty, 117
- Pharaoh: Darius II of Persia, 15
- Ancient Greek Olympiad (summer): 92nd Olympiad, year 4
- Assyrian calendar: 4342
- Balinese saka calendar: N/A
- Bengali calendar: −1002 – −1001
- Berber calendar: 542
- Buddhist calendar: 136
- Burmese calendar: −1046
- Byzantine calendar: 5100–5101
- Chinese calendar: 辛未年 (Metal Goat); 2289 or 2082 — to — 壬申年 (Water Monkey); 2290 or 2083
- Coptic calendar: −692 – −691
- Discordian calendar: 758
- Ethiopian calendar: −416 – −415
- Hebrew calendar: 3352–3353
- Hindu calendars
- Vikram Samvat: −352 – −351
- Shaka Samvat: N/A
- Kali Yuga: 2692–2693
- Holocene calendar: 9592
- Iranian calendar: 1030 BP – 1029 BP
- Islamic calendar: 1062 BH – 1061 BH
- Javanese calendar: N/A
- Julian calendar: N/A
- Korean calendar: 1925
- Minguo calendar: 2320 before ROC 民前2320年
- Nanakshahi calendar: −1876
- Thai solar calendar: 134–135
- Tibetan calendar: ལྕགས་མོ་ལུག་ལོ་ (female Iron-Sheep) −282 or −663 or −1435 — to — ཆུ་ཕོ་སྤྲེ་ལོ་ (male Water-Monkey) −281 or −662 or −1434

Year 409 BC was a year of the pre-Julian Roman calendar. At the time, it was known as the Year of the Consulship of Cossus and Medullinus (or, less frequently, year 345 Ab urbe condita). The denomination 409 BC for this year has been used since the early medieval period, when the Anno Domini calendar era became the prevalent method in Europe for naming years.

== Events ==
=== By place ===
==== Greece ====
- Alcibiades recaptures Byzantium, ending the city's rebellion from Athens. This action completes Athenian control of the Bosporus which secures the Athenian supply route for grain from the Bosporan Kingdom in the Black Sea region.
- The Athenian general, Thrasyllus, sails out from Athens with a sizable force to campaign in Ionia. There, he quickly captures Colophon and raids the Ionian countryside, but is defeated outside Ephesus by a combined Ephesian, Persian, and Syracusan force.
- Pausanias succeeds his father Pleistoanax as Agiad king of Sparta.
- The city of Rhodes is founded.

==== Sicily ====
- Taking advantage of the quarrels between the Greek cities in Sicily and of the mutual exhaustion of Athens and Syracuse, Carthage seeks to reimpose its influence over the island. Hannibal Mago, grandson of Hamilcar, invades Sicily with a strong force. He defeats the Sicilian Greeks and avenges his grandfather through the torture and killing of 3,000 Greek prisoners. In the Battle of Selinus and Battle of Himera he captures and destroys both cities before returning triumphantly to Carthage with the spoils of war.

=== By topic ===
==== Literature ====
- Sophocles' play Philoctetes is performed, with the theme of the Trojan War.

== Deaths ==
- Pleistoanax, king of Sparta since 458 BC
