= 433 BC =

433 BC in various calendars
- Gregorian calendar: 433 BC; CDXXXIII BC
- Ab urbe condita: 321
- Ancient Egypt era: XXVII dynasty, 93
- Pharaoh: Artaxerxes I of Persia, 33
- Ancient Greek Olympiad (summer): 86th Olympiad, year 4
- Assyrian calendar: 4318
- Balinese saka calendar: N/A
- Bengali calendar: −1026 – −1025
- Berber calendar: 518
- Buddhist calendar: 112
- Burmese calendar: −1070
- Byzantine calendar: 5076–5077
- Chinese calendar: 丁未年 (Fire Goat); 2265 or 2058 — to — 戊申年 (Earth Monkey); 2266 or 2059
- Coptic calendar: −716 – −715
- Discordian calendar: 734
- Ethiopian calendar: −440 – −439
- Hebrew calendar: 3328–3329
- Hindu calendars
- Vikram Samvat: −376 – −375
- Shaka Samvat: N/A
- Kali Yuga: 2668–2669
- Holocene calendar: 9568
- Iranian calendar: 1054 BP – 1053 BP
- Islamic calendar: 1086 BH – 1085 BH
- Javanese calendar: N/A
- Julian calendar: N/A
- Korean calendar: 1901
- Minguo calendar: 2344 before ROC 民前2344年
- Nanakshahi calendar: −1900
- Thai solar calendar: 110–111
- Tibetan calendar: མེ་མོ་ལུག་ལོ་ (female Fire-Sheep) −306 or −687 or −1459 — to — ས་ཕོ་སྤྲེ་ལོ་ (male Earth-Monkey) −305 or −686 or −1458

Year 433 BC was a year of the pre-Julian Roman calendar. At the time, it was known as the Year of the Tribunate of Vibulanus, Fidenas and Flaccinator (or, less frequently, year 321 Ab urbe condita). The denomination 433 BC for this year has been used since the early medieval period, when the Anno Domini calendar era became the prevalent method in Europe for naming years.

== Events ==
=== By place ===
==== Greece ====
- Pericles concludes a defensive alliance with Corcyra (Corfu), the strong naval power in the Ionian Sea, which is the bitter enemy of Corinth. As a result, Athens intervenes in the dispute between Corinth and Corcyra, and, at the Battle of Sybota, a small contingent of Athenian ships play a critical role in preventing a Corinthian fleet from capturing Corcyra. Following this, Athens places Potidaea, a tributary ally of Athens but a colony of Corinth, under siege.
- The Corinthians, upset by Athens' actions, lobby Sparta to take action against Athens. This appeal is backed by Megara (which is being severely affected by Pericles' economic sanctions) and by Aegina (which is being heavily taxed by Pericles and which has been refused home rule).
- Pericles renews alliances with the Rhegium on the southwest corner of Italy and Leontini in southeast Sicily, threatening Sparta's food supply route from Sicily.

=== By topic ===
==== Art ====
- A set of sixty-five bells, from the Tomb of Marquis Yi of Zeng (Zhou dynasty) in Suixian, Hubei, is made. It is now preserved at the Hubei Provincial Museum in Wuhan.

== Deaths ==
- Zeng Hou Yi, marquis of the state of Zeng, subordinate to Chu
