= 422 BC =

422 BC in various calendars
- Gregorian calendar: 422 BC; CDXXII BC
- Ab urbe condita: 332
- Ancient Egypt era: XXVII dynasty, 104
- Pharaoh: Darius II of Persia, 2
- Ancient Greek Olympiad (summer): 89th Olympiad, year 3
- Assyrian calendar: 4329
- Balinese saka calendar: N/A
- Bengali calendar: −1015 – −1014
- Berber calendar: 529
- Buddhist calendar: 123
- Burmese calendar: −1059
- Byzantine calendar: 5087–5088
- Chinese calendar: 戊午年 (Earth Horse); 2276 or 2069 — to — 己未年 (Earth Goat); 2277 or 2070
- Coptic calendar: −705 – −704
- Discordian calendar: 745
- Ethiopian calendar: −429 – −428
- Hebrew calendar: 3339–3340
- Hindu calendars
- Vikram Samvat: −365 – −364
- Shaka Samvat: N/A
- Kali Yuga: 2679–2680
- Holocene calendar: 9579
- Iranian calendar: 1043 BP – 1042 BP
- Islamic calendar: 1075 BH – 1074 BH
- Javanese calendar: N/A
- Julian calendar: N/A
- Korean calendar: 1912
- Minguo calendar: 2333 before ROC 民前2333年
- Nanakshahi calendar: −1889
- Thai solar calendar: 121–122
- Tibetan calendar: ས་ཕོ་རྟ་ལོ་ (male Earth-Horse) −295 or −676 or −1448 — to — ས་མོ་ལུག་ལོ་ (female Earth-Sheep) −294 or −675 or −1447

Year 422 BC was a year of the pre-Julian Roman calendar. At the time, it was known as the Year of the Tribunate of Capitolinus, Mugillanus and Merenda (or, less frequently, year 332 Ab urbe condita). The denomination 422 BC for this year has been used since the early medieval period, when the Anno Domini calendar era became the prevalent method in Europe for naming years.

== Events ==
=== By place ===
==== Greece ====
- Athenian leader, Cleon, ends the truce between Athens and Sparta after he resolves to rescue the town of Amphipolis in Macedonia. However, through skillful generalship by Brasidas, the Spartans rout the Athenians in the Battle of Amphipolis. Both Brasidas and Cleon are killed in the battle, thereby removing the key members of the pro-war factions on both sides.
- Alcibiades takes over the leadership of the pro-war party in Athens.

=== By topic ===
==== Drama ====
- Aristophanes' play The Wasps is performed.

== Deaths ==
- Brasidas, Spartan general
- Cleon, Athenian politician and general
