= 434 BC =

434 BC in various calendars
- Gregorian calendar: 434 BC; CDXXXIV BC
- Ab urbe condita: 320
- Ancient Egypt era: XXVII dynasty, 92
- Pharaoh: Artaxerxes I of Persia, 32
- Ancient Greek Olympiad (summer): 86th Olympiad, year 3
- Assyrian calendar: 4317
- Balinese saka calendar: N/A
- Bengali calendar: −1027 – −1026
- Berber calendar: 517
- Buddhist calendar: 111
- Burmese calendar: −1071
- Byzantine calendar: 5075–5076
- Chinese calendar: 丙午年 (Fire Horse); 2264 or 2057 — to — 丁未年 (Fire Goat); 2265 or 2058
- Coptic calendar: −717 – −716
- Discordian calendar: 733
- Ethiopian calendar: −441 – −440
- Hebrew calendar: 3327–3328
- Hindu calendars
- Vikram Samvat: −377 – −376
- Shaka Samvat: N/A
- Kali Yuga: 2667–2668
- Holocene calendar: 9567
- Iranian calendar: 1055 BP – 1054 BP
- Islamic calendar: 1087 BH – 1086 BH
- Javanese calendar: N/A
- Julian calendar: N/A
- Korean calendar: 1900
- Minguo calendar: 2345 before ROC 民前2345年
- Nanakshahi calendar: −1901
- Thai solar calendar: 109–110
- Tibetan calendar: མེ་ཕོ་རྟ་ལོ་ (male Fire-Horse) −307 or −688 or −1460 — to — མེ་མོ་ལུག་ལོ་ (female Fire-Sheep) −306 or −687 or −1459

Year 434 BC was a year of the pre-Julian Roman calendar. At the time, it was known as the Second year of the Consulship of Iullus and Tricostus or the Year of the Consulship of Capitolinus and Praetextatus and the Year of the Tribunate of Cossus, Praetextatus and Capitolinus (or, less frequently, year 320 Ab urbe condita). The denomination 434 BC for this year has been used since the early medieval period, when the Anno Domini calendar era became the prevalent method in Europe for naming years.

== Events ==
=== By place ===
==== Greece ====
- Under the leadership of Pericles, Athens introduces a series of measures (the "Megarian decree") imposing an economic embargo on Megara for violations of land sacred to Demeter. According to the provisions of the decree, Megarian merchants are to be excluded from the market of Athens and the ports in its empire. This ban strangles the Megarian economy and strains the fragile peace between Athens and Sparta, which is allied with Megara.
- Philip, brother of Perdiccas II of Macedon challenges Perdiccas for the throne, and enlists the support of Athens and King Derdas of Elimea. Perdiccas responds by stirring up rebellion in a number of Athenian tribute cities, including Potidaea.
- Anaxagoras is reportedly prosecuted in Athens on charges related to his religious and philosophical views. The date of his trial is disputed by scholars.

=== By topic ===
==== Mathematics ====
- While in prison, Anaxagoras tries to square the circle with straightedge and compasses.

== Deaths ==
- Duke Jing of Jin
