= 454 BC =

454 BC in various calendars
Gregorian calendar	454 BC; CDLIV BC
Ab urbe condita	300
Ancient Egypt era	XXVII dynasty, 72
Pharaoh	Artaxerxes I of Persia, 12
Ancient Greek Olympiad (summer)	81st Olympiad, year 3
Assyrian calendar	4297
Balinese saka calendar	N/A
Bengali calendar	−1047 – −1046
Berber calendar	497
Buddhist calendar	91
Burmese calendar	−1091
Byzantine calendar	5055–5056
Chinese calendar	丙戌年 (Fire Dog); 2244 or 2037 — to — 丁亥年 (Fire Pig); 2245 or 2038
Coptic calendar	−737 – −736
Discordian calendar	713
Ethiopian calendar	−461 – −460
Hebrew calendar	3307–3308
- Hindu calendars
Vikram Samvat	−397 – −396
Shaka Samvat	N/A
Kali Yuga	2647–2648
Holocene calendar	9547
Iranian calendar	1075 BP – 1074 BP
Islamic calendar	1108 BH – 1107 BH
Javanese calendar	N/A
Julian calendar	N/A
Korean calendar	1880
Minguo calendar	2365 before ROC 民前2365年
Nanakshahi calendar	−1921
Thai solar calendar	89–90
Tibetan calendar	མེ་ཕོ་ཁྱི་ལོ་ (male Fire-Dog) −327 or −708 or −1480 — to — མེ་མོ་ཕག་ལོ་ (female Fire-Boar) −326 or −707 or −1479

Year 454 BC was a year of the pre-Julian Roman calendar. At the time, it was known as the Year of the Consulship of Capitolinus and Varus (or, less frequently, year 300 Ab urbe condita). The denomination 454 BC for this year has been used since the early medieval period, when the Anno Domini calendar era became the prevalent method in Europe for naming years.

== Events ==
=== By place ===
==== Persian Empire ====
- Persian rule in Egypt is finally restored by Megabyzus, satrap of Syria, after a prolonged struggle which has included dealing with a military intervention by Athens. The leader of the revolt, Inaros II, is crucified by the Persians.

==== India ====
- Mahavira attains Kevala Jnana at the age of 43, according to the Śvetāmbara branch of Jain philosophy.

==== Greece ====
- Pericles leads a naval expedition in the Corinthian Gulf, in which Athens defeats Achaea. He then attacks Sicyon and Acarnania, after which he unsuccessfully tries to take Oeniadea on the Corinthian Gulf, before returning to Athens.
- Pericles declares that the Delian League's considerable treasury at Delos is not safe from the Persian navy and has the treasury transferred to Athens, thus strengthening Athens' power over the League.

==== Roman Republic ====
- The Roman Plebs, suffering from a number of economic and financial ills, force the city’s patricians to begin the reform and codification of the law. As a first act, a three-man commission is sent to Athens to study that city's laws.

==== Sicily ====
- Hostilities between Segesta and Selinunte, two Greek cities on Sicily, take place over access to the Tyrrhenian Sea.

== Deaths ==
- Alexander I of Macedon
