= 455 BC =

455 BC in various calendars
Gregorian calendar	455 BC; CDLV BC
Ab urbe condita	299
Ancient Egypt era	XXVII dynasty, 71
Pharaoh	Artaxerxes I of Persia, 11
Ancient Greek Olympiad (summer)	81st Olympiad, year 2
Assyrian calendar	4296
Balinese saka calendar	N/A
Bengali calendar	−1048 – −1047
Berber calendar	496
Buddhist calendar	90
Burmese calendar	−1092
Byzantine calendar	5054–5055
Chinese calendar	乙酉年 (Wood Rooster); 2243 or 2036 — to — 丙戌年 (Fire Dog); 2244 or 2037
Coptic calendar	−738 – −737
Discordian calendar	712
Ethiopian calendar	−462 – −461
Hebrew calendar	3306–3307
- Hindu calendars
Vikram Samvat	−398 – −397
Shaka Samvat	N/A
Kali Yuga	2646–2647
Holocene calendar	9546
Iranian calendar	1076 BP – 1075 BP
Islamic calendar	1109 BH – 1108 BH
Javanese calendar	N/A
Julian calendar	N/A
Korean calendar	1879
Minguo calendar	2366 before ROC 民前2366年
Nanakshahi calendar	−1922
Thai solar calendar	88–89
Tibetan calendar	ཤིང་མོ་བྱ་ལོ་ (female Wood-Bird) −328 or −709 or −1481 — to — མེ་ཕོ་ཁྱི་ལོ་ (male Fire-Dog) −327 or −708 or −1480

Year 455 BC was a year of the pre-Julian Roman calendar. At the time, it was known as the Year of the Consulship of Vaticanus and Cicurinus (or, less frequently, year 299 Ab urbe condita). The denomination 455 BC for this year has been used since the early medieval period, when the Anno Domini calendar era became the prevalent method in Europe for naming years.

== Events ==
=== By place ===
==== Greece ====
- Athens, under Athenian general Tolmides, sends 100 ships around the Peloponnesus and they set fire to the Spartan naval base at Gythion. As a result, Athens gains the agreement of the Achaean cities to join the Delian League. Athenian forces then go on to attack the Spartan allies on the Corinthian Gulf. Athens is now able to confine Sparta to the southern Peloponnesus.
- The Athenians suffer a severe defeat in Egypt at the hands of the Persians. After being cut off in the Nile Delta, the Athenian fleet is defeated, and the Athenian army retreats across the Sinai Desert to Byblos before its remnants are rescued. The Egyptian rebel Inaros is crucified by the Persians. The Athenians decide against any further military activity in Egypt.

==== China ====
- Spring and Autumn period: The Battle of Jinyang begins with the armies of Zhi, Wei and Han laying siege to Jinyang.

=== By topic ===
==== Literature ====
- Euripides presents his earliest known tragedy, Peliades, in the Athenian festival of Dionysia.
