= 472 BC =

472 BC in various calendars
- Gregorian calendar: 472 BC; CDLXXII BC
- Ab urbe condita: 282
- Ancient Egypt era: XXVII dynasty, 54
- Pharaoh: Xerxes I of Persia, 14
- Ancient Greek Olympiad (summer): 77th Olympiad (victor)¹
- Assyrian calendar: 4279
- Balinese saka calendar: N/A
- Bengali calendar: −1065 – −1064
- Berber calendar: 479
- Buddhist calendar: 73
- Burmese calendar: −1109
- Byzantine calendar: 5037–5038
- Chinese calendar: 戊辰年 (Earth Dragon); 2226 or 2019 — to — 己巳年 (Earth Snake); 2227 or 2020
- Coptic calendar: −755 – −754
- Discordian calendar: 695
- Ethiopian calendar: −479 – −478
- Hebrew calendar: 3289–3290
- Hindu calendars
- Vikram Samvat: −415 – −414
- Shaka Samvat: N/A
- Kali Yuga: 2629–2630
- Holocene calendar: 9529
- Iranian calendar: 1093 BP – 1092 BP
- Islamic calendar: 1127 BH – 1126 BH
- Javanese calendar: N/A
- Julian calendar: N/A
- Korean calendar: 1862
- Minguo calendar: 2383 before ROC 民前2383年
- Nanakshahi calendar: −1939
- Thai solar calendar: 71–72
- Tibetan calendar: ས་ཕོ་འབྲུག་ལོ་ (male Earth-Dragon) −345 or −726 or −1498 — to — ས་མོ་སྦྲུལ་ལོ་ (female Earth-Snake) −344 or −725 or −1497

Year 472 BC was a year of the pre-Julian Roman calendar. At the time, it was known as the Year of the Consulship of Rufus and Fusus (or, less frequently, year 282 Ab urbe condita). The denomination 472 BC for this year has been used since the early medieval period, when the Anno Domini calendar era became the prevalent method in Europe for naming years.

== Events ==
=== By place ===
==== Greece ====
- Carystus in Euboea is forced to join the Delian League after the Athenians attack the city (approximate date).

==== Roman Republic ====
- Orbinia, a Vestal virgin, is executed via live burial.

=== By topic ===
==== Literature ====
- The tragedy The Persians is produced by Aeschylus. It is the oldest surviving classical Greek play.

== Births ==
- Thucydides, Greek historian (d.c. 400 BC)
