= Dandes of Argos =

Ancient Greek runner

Dandes of Argos (Ancient Greek: Δάνδης Ἀργεῖος, transcr. Dandḗs Argeíos, "Dandes [the] Argive") was an ancient Greek athlete listed by Eusebius of Caesarea as a victor in the stadion race of the 77th Olympiad (472 BC). He won two races, but the first was probably in the boys' category, maybe in the 75th Olympiad eight years earlier. He also won once at the Pythian Games and three times at the Nemean Games, according to some sources; elsewhere, his victories were celebrated by Simonides of Ceos in a poem, which claims that he won fifteen times at Nemea – the discrepancy could again be due to victories in boys' races not recorded elsewhere.

The poem, an epitaph preserved in the Greek Anthology, reads:

Ἀργεῖος Δάνδης σταδιοδρόμος ἐνθάδε κεῖται,
νίκαις ἱππόβοτον πατρίδ᾿ ἐπευκλεΐσας, Ὀλυμπίᾳ δίς,
ἐν δὲ Πυθῶνι τρία, δύω δ᾿ ἐν Ἰσθμῷ, πεντεκαίδεκ᾿ ἐν Νεμέᾳ
τὰς δ᾿ ἄλλας νίκας οὐκ εὐμαρές ἐστ᾿ ἀριθμῆσαι

Here lies Dandes of Argos, the stadion racer, who gained honour
by his victories for his fatherland, rich in pasture for horses. Twice did he conquer at Olympia,
thrice at Delphi, twice at the Isthmus, and fifteen times at Nemea,
and it is not easy to count his other victories.

— Simonides, Greek Anthology XIII.14

Dandes is notable not only as an athlete, but for the frame of reference his various victories provide to such events as the death of tyrant Theron of Acragas (also an Olympic competitor and victor) and the beginning of the war between Theron's son Thrasydaeus and Hiero I of Syracuse (chariot victor in the 78th Olympiad), events recorded by Dionysius of Halicarnassus and Diodorus Siculus with Dandes's victory as a starting point.

That same year in Hellenic calendars – probably the next year in the modern calendar – the Romans were defeated by the Veiians at the Battle of the Cremera, at least according to Diodorus Siculus and Dionysius of Halicarnassus, who both reference Dandes stadion victory. On the other hand, some time between the years 479–77 BCE in the modern calendar is commonly accepted on the evidence of Livy, giving the dates of consuls ab urbe condita.

Diodorus reports unequivocally only that there was a battle and that the Romans were defeated, using the phrase "ὧν φασί τινες", translated "according to some" three hundred Fabians (Livy says three hundred-and-six) killed there and states the Year 177th Olympiad/472-1 BCE date; thus he seems to disagree not only with the chronology, but also seems to be unwilling to take the legend of the Fabians at face value. Dionysius goes even further, calling one part of the Livian narrative, concerning stories of the survival of one lone Fabian boy who was too young to join the battle "μύθοις γὰρ δὴ ταῦτά γε καὶ πλάσμασιν ἔοικε θεατρικοῖς", "myths and theatrical fabrications". Either the Roman three hundred-or-so were defeated coincidentally just after the famous Three Hundred Spartans, or coincidentally just after a major war erupted in Sicily. This is an interesting problem in synchronicity for modern scholars who have analysed the topic, and also an insight into possible manipulation of historical events by an aristocratic Roman clan for propaganda purposes.

== See also ==
- List of Olympic winners of the Stadion race

== Works cited ==
- Dillery, John (2009). "Roman Historians and the Greeks: Audiences and Models". In Feldher, Andrew (ed.). The Cambridge Companion to the Roman Historians. New York: Cambridge University Press.
