= 487 BC =

487 BC in various calendars
- Gregorian calendar: 487 BC; CDLXXXVII BC
- Ab urbe condita: 267
- Ancient Egypt era: XXVII dynasty, 39
- Pharaoh: Darius I of Persia, 35
- Ancient Greek Olympiad (summer): 73rd Olympiad, year 2
- Assyrian calendar: 4264
- Balinese saka calendar: N/A
- Bengali calendar: −1080 – −1079
- Berber calendar: 464
- Buddhist calendar: 58
- Burmese calendar: −1124
- Byzantine calendar: 5022–5023
- Chinese calendar: 癸丑年 (Water Ox); 2211 or 2004 — to — 甲寅年 (Wood Tiger); 2212 or 2005
- Coptic calendar: −770 – −769
- Discordian calendar: 680
- Ethiopian calendar: −494 – −493
- Hebrew calendar: 3274–3275
- Hindu calendars
- Vikram Samvat: −430 – −429
- Shaka Samvat: N/A
- Kali Yuga: 2614–2615
- Holocene calendar: 9514
- Iranian calendar: 1108 BP – 1107 BP
- Islamic calendar: 1142 BH – 1141 BH
- Javanese calendar: N/A
- Julian calendar: N/A
- Korean calendar: 1847
- Minguo calendar: 2398 before ROC 民前2398年
- Nanakshahi calendar: −1954
- Thai solar calendar: 56–57
- Tibetan calendar: ཆུ་མོ་གླང་ལོ་ (female Water-Ox) −360 or −741 or −1513 — to — ཤིང་ཕོ་སྟག་ལོ་ (male Wood-Tiger) −359 or −740 or −1512

487 BC was a year of the pre-Julian Roman calendar. At the time, it was known as the Year of the Consulship of Sicinius and Aquillius (or, less frequently, year 267 Ab urbe condita). The denomination 487 BC for this year has been used since the early medieval period, when the Anno Domini calendar era became the prevalent method in Europe for naming years.

== Events ==
=== By place ===
==== Greece ====
- The island of Aegina and the city of Athens go to war. The island has earned the enmity of Athens by earlier submitting to the Persians. The Spartan King, Leotychidas, tries unsuccessfully to arrange a truce in the war.
- The Athenian Archonship becomes elective by lot from all the citizens, an important milestone in the move towards radical Athenian democracy. There are nine archons and a secretary. Three of the archons have special functions: the basileus, or sovereign; the polemarch (originally a military commander); and the archon eponymous (chief magistrate), who gave his name to the year.
- First known use of ostracism, an instrument created in 508 by Cleisthenes which enabled the electorate to banish for ten years any citizen deemed to be a threat to democracy. It was intended, therefore, as a safeguard against tyranny. An ostracism could be held annually providing a quorum of 6,000 was achieved but, apparently, the Assembly declined to invoke it until 487 when there was a popular reaction against Hipparchos the Pisistradid who had been the peace party archon in 496. He was the first of several citizens to be ostracised through the fifth century.

==== Rome ====
- Wars are fought between Rome and each of the Volsci and the Hernici. Rome prevails in both disputes.

==== Kush ====
- Siaspiqa becomes ruler of the Kushite kingdom of Meroe, likely succeeding Amaniastabarqa.

== Births ==
- Gorgias, Greek philosopher (approximate date) (d. c. 376 BC)

== Sources ==
- Bury, J. B.; Meiggs, Russell (1975) [first published 1900]. A History of Greece (Fourth ed.). London: MacMillan Press. ISBN 0-333-15492-4.
