= 451 BC =

451 BC in various calendars
Gregorian calendar	451 BC; CDLI BC
Ab urbe condita	303
Ancient Egypt era	XXVII dynasty, 75
Pharaoh	Artaxerxes I of Persia, 15
Ancient Greek Olympiad (summer)	82nd Olympiad, year 2
Assyrian calendar	4300
Balinese saka calendar	N/A
Bengali calendar	−1044 – −1043
Berber calendar	500
Buddhist calendar	94
Burmese calendar	−1088
Byzantine calendar	5058–5059
Chinese calendar	己丑年 (Earth Ox); 2247 or 2040 — to — 庚寅年 (Metal Tiger); 2248 or 2041
Coptic calendar	−734 – −733
Discordian calendar	716
Ethiopian calendar	−458 – −457
Hebrew calendar	3310–3311
- Hindu calendars
Vikram Samvat	−394 – −393
Shaka Samvat	N/A
Kali Yuga	2650–2651
Holocene calendar	9550
Iranian calendar	1072 BP – 1071 BP
Islamic calendar	1105 BH – 1104 BH
Javanese calendar	N/A
Julian calendar	N/A
Korean calendar	1883
Minguo calendar	2362 before ROC 民前2362年
Nanakshahi calendar	−1918
Thai solar calendar	92–93
Tibetan calendar	ས་མོ་གླང་ལོ་ (female Earth-Ox) −324 or −705 or −1477 — to — ལྕགས་ཕོ་སྟག་ལོ་ (male Iron-Tiger) −323 or −704 or −1476

Year 451 BC was a year of the pre-Julian Roman calendar. At the time, it was known as the Year of the Consulship of Sabinus and Augurinus and the First year of the decemviri (or, less frequently, year 303 Ab urbe condita). The denomination 451 BC for this year has been used since the early medieval period, when the Anno Domini calendar era became the prevalent method in Europe, for naming years.

== Events ==
=== By place ===
==== Greece ====
- The Persian fleet moves against a rebellious Cyprus to restore order. Kimon, who returns to favour, though not to power, in Athens, plans an expedition to help Cyprus. He gains Pericles' support.
- An Athenian law sponsored by Pericles is passed giving citizenship only to those born of Athenian parents. This marks an end to the policy where residents who were from other cities could be given an honourable status.
- Hostilities among the Greek states come to a formal end with the agreement to the Five Years' Truce. Kimon negotiates a five year truce with Sparta, in which Athens agrees to abandon its alliance with Argos, while Sparta promises to give up its alliance with Thebes. During the same year Argos signs the first "Thirty-Years Peace" with Sparta.

==== Roman Republic ====
- Following the report of a three-man commission into the design of Roman law, the patricians set up in Rome a Board of Ten, the Decemviri. The first Decemviri, composed entirely of patricians is led by consuls Appius Claudius Crassus and Titus Genucius Augurinus. The first ten codes of the Roman Law of the Twelve Tables are completed by the first Decemvirate.
