= 468 BC =

468 BC in various calendars
Gregorian calendar	468 BC; CDLXVIII BC
Ab urbe condita	286
Ancient Egypt era	XXVII dynasty, 58
Pharaoh	Xerxes I of Persia, 18
Ancient Greek Olympiad (summer)	78th Olympiad (victor)¹
Assyrian calendar	4283
Balinese saka calendar	N/A
Bengali calendar	−1061 – −1060
Berber calendar	483
Buddhist calendar	77
Burmese calendar	−1105
Byzantine calendar	5041–5042
Chinese calendar	壬申年 (Water Monkey); 2230 or 2023 — to — 癸酉年 (Water Rooster); 2231 or 2024
Coptic calendar	−751 – −750
Discordian calendar	699
Ethiopian calendar	−475 – −474
Hebrew calendar	3293–3294
- Hindu calendars
Vikram Samvat	−411 – −410
Shaka Samvat	N/A
Kali Yuga	2633–2634
Holocene calendar	9533
Iranian calendar	1089 BP – 1088 BP
Islamic calendar	1122 BH – 1121 BH
Javanese calendar	N/A
Julian calendar	N/A
Korean calendar	1866
Minguo calendar	2379 before ROC 民前2379年
Nanakshahi calendar	−1935
Thai solar calendar	75–76
Tibetan calendar	ཆུ་ཕོ་སྤྲེ་ལོ་ (male Water-Monkey) −341 or −722 or −1494 — to — ཆུ་མོ་བྱ་ལོ་ (female Water-Bird) −340 or −721 or −1493

Year 468 BC was a year of the pre-Julian Roman calendar. At the time, it was known as the Year of the Consulship of Barbatus and Priscus (or, less frequently, year 286 Ab urbe condita). The denomination 468 BC for this year has been used since the early medieval time, when the Anno Domini calendar era became the prevalent method in Europe for naming years.

== Events ==
=== By place ===
==== Greece ====
- Sparta faces trouble near home, mainly from Arcadia with the support of Argos. Argos regains control of Tiryns.

==== Roman Republic ====
- Antium is captured by Roman forces.

==== China ====
- Zhou Zhen Ding Wang becomes the twenty-eighth sovereign of the Chinese Zhou dynasty.

=== By topic ===
==== Literature ====
- Sophocles, Greek playwright, defeats Aeschylus for the Athenian Prize.

== Deaths ==
- Aristides, Athenian statesman (b. 530 BC)
