= Spurius Maelius =

Wealthy Roman plebeian (died 439 BC)

Spurius Maelius (died 439 BC) was a wealthy Roman plebeian who was slain because he was suspected of intending to make himself king.

== Biography ==
During a severe famine, Spurius Maelius bought up a large amount of wheat and sold it at a low price to the people of Rome. According to Livy, this caused Lucius Minucius Augurinus, the patrician praefectus annonae (president of the market), to accuse Spurius Maelius of collecting arms in his house, and that he was holding secret meetings at which plans were being undoubtedly formed to establish a monarchy. The accusation was widely believed. Maelius was summoned before the aged Cincinnatus (specially appointed dictator), but he refused to appear, and was slain by the magister equitum, Gaius Servilius Ahala. Afterward his house was razed to the ground, his wheat distributed amongst the people, and his property confiscated. The open space called the Aequimaelium, on which his house had stood, preserved the memory of his death along the Vicus Jugarius. Cicero as well as anti-Caesar sources, calls Ahala's deed a glorious one, but, whether Maelius entertained any serious aspirations or not, his summary execution was an act of murder, since by the Lex Valeria Horatia de provocatione the dictator was bound to allow the right of appeal.

== See also ==
- Marcus Junius Brutus

== Sources ==
- Niebuhr's History of Rome, ii. 418 (Eng. trans., 1851);
- G. Cornewall Lewis, Credibility of early Roman History, ii.;
- Livy, iv. 13;
- Ancient sources: Livy, iv.13; Cicero, De senectute 16, De amicitia 8, De republica, ii.49; Florus, i.26; Dionysius Halicarnassensis xii.I.
