= 464 BC =

464 BC in various calendars
| Gregorian calendar | 464 BC; CDLXIV BC |
| Ab urbe condita | 290 |
| Ancient Egypt era | XXVII dynasty, 62 |
| Pharaoh | Artaxerxes I of Persia, 2 |
| Ancient Greek Olympiad (summer) | 79th Olympiad (victor)¹ |
| Assyrian calendar | 4287 |
| Balinese saka calendar | N/A |
| Bengali calendar | −1057 – −1056 |
| Berber calendar | 487 |
| Buddhist calendar | 81 |
| Burmese calendar | −1101 |
| Byzantine calendar | 5045–5046 |
| Chinese calendar | 丙子年 (Fire Rat); 2234 or 2027 — to — 丁丑年 (Fire Ox); 2235 or 2028 |
| Coptic calendar | −747 – −746 |
| Discordian calendar | 703 |
| Ethiopian calendar | −471 – −470 |
| Hebrew calendar | 3297–3298 |
- Hindu calendars
| Vikram Samvat | −407 – −406 |
| Shaka Samvat | N/A |
| Kali Yuga | 2637–2638 |
| Holocene calendar | 9537 |
| Iranian calendar | 1085 BP – 1084 BP |
| Islamic calendar | 1118 BH – 1117 BH |
| Javanese calendar | N/A |
| Julian calendar | N/A |
| Korean calendar | 1870 |
| Minguo calendar | 2375 before ROC 民前2375年 |
| Nanakshahi calendar | −1931 |
| Thai solar calendar | 79–80 |
| Tibetan calendar | 阳火鼠年 (male Fire-Rat) −337 or −718 or −1490 — to — 阴火牛年 (female Fire-Ox) −336 or −717 or −1489 |

Year 464 BC was a year of the pre-Julian Roman calendar. At the time, it was known as the Year of the Consulship of Albinus and Fusus (or, less frequently, year 290 Ab urbe condita). The denomination 464 BC for this year has been used since the early medieval period, when the Anno Domini calendar era became the prevalent method in Europe for naming years.

== Events ==
=== By place ===
==== Greece ====
- Sparta suffers the effects of a severe earthquake leading to a large loss of life.
- When the Messenian helots (serfs) revolt against their Spartan masters following the severe earthquake, King Archidamus II organises the defence of Sparta. The helots fortify themselves at Mount Ithome.

==== Persian Empire ====
- Egypt seizes the opportunity created by the murder of Xerxes I to revolt against Persia. The revolt is led by Inaros, a Libyan, who gains control of the Delta region and is aided by the Athenians.
- Artaxerxes I succeeds Xerxes as king of the Persian empire.
