= 448 BC =

448 BC in various calendars
Gregorian calendar	448 BC; CDXLVIII BC
Ab urbe condita	306
Ancient Egypt era	XXVII dynasty, 78
Pharaoh	Artaxerxes I of Persia, 18
Ancient Greek Olympiad (summer)	83rd Olympiad (victor)¹
Assyrian calendar	4303
Balinese saka calendar	N/A
Bengali calendar	−1041 – −1040
Berber calendar	503
Buddhist calendar	97
Burmese calendar	−1085
Byzantine calendar	5061–5062
Chinese calendar	壬辰年 (Water Dragon); 2250 or 2043 — to — 癸巳年 (Water Snake); 2251 or 2044
Coptic calendar	−731 – −730
Discordian calendar	719
Ethiopian calendar	−455 – −454
Hebrew calendar	3313–3314
- Hindu calendars
Vikram Samvat	−391 – −390
Shaka Samvat	N/A
Kali Yuga	2653–2654
Holocene calendar	9553
Iranian calendar	1069 BP – 1068 BP
Islamic calendar	1102 BH – 1101 BH
Javanese calendar	N/A
Julian calendar	N/A
Korean calendar	1886
Minguo calendar	2359 before ROC 民前2359年
Nanakshahi calendar	−1915
Thai solar calendar	95–96
Tibetan calendar	阳水龙年 (male Water-Dragon) −321 or −702 or −1474 — to — 阴水蛇年 (female Water-Snake) −320 or −701 or −1473

Year 448 BC was a year of the pre-Julian Roman calendar. At the time, it was known as the Year of the Consulship of Coritinesanus and Caeliomontanus (or, less frequently, year 306 Ab urbe condita). The denomination 448 BC for this year has been used since the early medieval period, when the Anno Domini calendar era became the prevalent method in Europe for naming years.

== Events ==
=== By place ===
==== Greece ====
- Pericles leads the Athenian army against Delphi to restore the sanctuary of the oracle of Delphi to Phocis.
- The Athenians begin constructing the middle component of the Long Walls from their main city to its port of Piraeus.

==== Rome ====
- Following the co-optation of two patricians to the office of Tribune of the Plebs, the tribune Lucius Trebonius Asper introduces the Lex Trebonia, a law forbidding tribunes from co-opting their colleagues in the future.

== Births ==
- Bardyllis, king of Dardania (d. 358 BC)
