= 430s BC =

Decade

This article concerns the period 439 BC – 430 BC.

== Events ==
=== 439 BC ===
==== By place ====
====== Greece ======
- As a result of Persian assistance to Samos, it takes the Athenian army nine months to successfully complete its siege of Samos and force the Samians to surrender. Samos becomes a tributary of Athens.

====== Roman Republic ======
- Spurius Maelius, a wealthy Roman plebeian, tries to buy popular support with the aim of making himself king. During the severe famine affecting Rome, he buys up a large store of grain and sells it at a low price to the people of Rome – the first time this had been done in Rome. This leads Lucius Minucius, the patrician praefectus annonae ("president of the market"), to accuse Maelius of seeking to take over the government.
- Lucius Quinctius Cincinnatus is made dictator of the Roman Republic for a second time to deal with the Maelius controversy. He appoints Gaius Servilius Ahala as his Master of the Horse.
- Maelius is summoned before Cincinnatus but refuses to appear. Shortly thereafter, Maelius is killed by Gaius Servilius Ahala and his house is burnt to the ground.

=== 438 BC ===
==== By place ====
====== Greece ======
- The Parthenon on the Acropolis at Athens is completed by Ictinus and Callicrates and is consecrated after 9 years of construction. It is dedicated at the Panathenaea (a festival held in honour of Athena every four years on the Acropolis).
- The colossal statue of the Athena Parthenos, which Phidias has made for the Parthenon, is completed and dedicated. It is made of gold and ivory and stands some 12 metres high.
- Telephus, a play by the renowned playwright Euripides, is produced in Athens. This tragedy did not survive to modern times.

====== Italy ======
- The city of Capua falls to the Samnites.

==== By topic ====
====== Literature ======
- The Greek playwright Euripides' play Alcestis is performed in the Dionysia, an Athenian dramatic festival.

====== Art ======
- Three seated Goddesses (possibly Hestia, Dione and Aphrodite), from the east pediment of the Parthenon, are made (finished in 432 BC). They are now kept at The British Museum in London.
- The Ionic frieze on the north side of the Parthenon, is created (finished in 432 BC). Parts of this frieze are now preserved in museums in Europe, including the Horsemen (at the British Museum, London), and the Marshals and Young Women (now at Musée du Louvre, Paris), which once formed part of the Procession on the frieze.

=== 437 BC ===
==== By place ====
====== Greece ======
- Pericles, concerned for Athenian trade with Greek settlements to the East, and in order to counteract a new and possibly threatening Thracian–Scythian alliance, leads Athens' fleet to Pontus on the Black Sea and establishes friendly relations with the Greek cities of the region.

==== By topic ====
====== Architecture ======
- Mnesikles starts to build Propylaia, Acropolis, Athens. The work is canceled in 432 BC, due to the Peloponnesian war, and thus is never finished.

=== 436 BC ===
==== By place ====
====== Greece ======
- Following Pericles' visit to the Black Sea, a large Athenian colony is founded at Amphipolis. This is disconcertingly close to an outpost of Corinthian influence at Potidaea in the Chalcidice. Corinth feels it is being indirectly pressured by Athens.

=== 435 BC ===
==== By place ====
====== Greece ======
- A dispute arises between Epidamnus' oligarchs and democratic forces in the Greek colony. Most of the colony's inhabitants originate from Corinth or Corcyra (Corfu). Epidamnus' oligarchs are exiled and then appeal to Corcyra for help, while the democrats enlist the support of Corinth. Corcyra is then attacked by Corinth as the dispute heats up.

====== Italy ======
- Forces of the Roman Republic, led by dictator Quintus Servilius Priscus, captured the nearby city of Fidenae by tunneling in through the hill the town was built upon. He was awarded the cognomen 'Fidenas' as a reward for his success.

==== By topic ====
====== Art ======
- A gold and ivory statue of Zeus, king of the gods, is completed at Elis by the Athenian sculptor Phidias for the Temple of Zeus at Olympia. The statue becomes one of the Seven Wonders of the World. The Olympian Zeus is about seven times life size (or 13 metres) and occupies the full height of the temple.

=== 434 BC ===
==== By place ====
====== Greece ======
- Under the leadership of Pericles, Athens introduces a series of measures (the "Megarian decree") imposing an economic embargo on Megara for violations of land sacred to Demeter. According to the provisions of the decree, Megarian merchants are to be excluded from the market of Athens and the ports in its empire. This ban strangles the Megarian economy and strains the fragile peace between Athens and Sparta, which is allied with Megara.
- Philip, brother of Perdiccas II of Macedon challenges Perdiccas for the throne, and enlists the support of Athens and King Derdas of Elimea. Perdiccas responds by stirring up rebellion in a number of Athenian tribute cities, including Potidaea.
- Anaxagoras is arrested by Pericles' political opponents on a charge of contravening the established dogmas of Athenian religion. It takes Pericles' power of oratory and persuasion to secure his release, and even then, he is fined and forced to retire from Athens to Lampsacus in Ionia.

==== By topic ====
====== Mathematics ======
- While in prison, Anaxagoras tries to square the circle with straightedge and compasses.

=== 433 BC ===
==== By place ====
====== Greece ======
- Pericles concludes a defensive alliance with Corcyra (Corfu), the strong naval power in the Ionian Sea, which is the bitter enemy of Corinth. As a result, Athens intervenes in the dispute between Corinth and Corcyra, and, at the Battle of Sybota, a small contingent of Athenian ships play a critical role in preventing a Corinthian fleet from capturing Corcyra. Following this, Athens places Potidaea, a tributary ally of Athens but a colony of Corinth, under siege.
- The Corinthians, upset by Athens' actions, lobby Sparta to take action against Athens. This appeal is backed by Megara (which is being severely affected by Pericles' economic sanctions) and by Aegina (which is being heavily taxed by Pericles and which has been refused home rule).
- Pericles renews alliances with the Rhegium on the southwest corner of Italy and Leontini in southeast Sicily, threatening Sparta's food supply route from Sicily.

==== By topic ====
====== Art ======
- A set of sixty-five bells, from the Tomb of Marquis Yi of Zeng (Zhou dynasty) in Suixian, Hubei, is made. It is now preserved at the Hubei Provincial Museum in Wuhan.

=== 432 BC ===
==== By place ====
====== Greece ======
- Sparta calls and hosts a conference of the Peloponnesian League. The conference is attended by Athenian representatives as well as members of the League. Following arguments by Corinth against Athens, a majority of the League members vote to declare that the Athenians had broken the peace.
- The Athenian admiral, Phormio, continues the siege of Potidaea by blocking the entrance to the Gulf of Corinth. Meanwhile an Athenian fleet, led by Archestratus, sails for Potidaea. However, instead of attacking Potidaea, they attack the Macedonians under Perdiccas II, who have allied with the Potidaeans. The Athenians capture Therma (modern Thessalonica) and then go on to besiege Pydna. However, as the Athenians are besieging Pydna, they receive news that Corinth has sent a force under the command of Aristeus to support Potidaea. In response, Athens sends more troops and ships under the command of Hipponicus. The combined Athenian force sails to Potidaea and lands there. In the ensuing Battle of Potidaea, the Athenians are victorious against Corinth and its allies.

====== Italy ======
- The Greek colony of Heraclea in Southern Italy is founded by colonists from Tarentum and Thurii.

====== China ======
- The Chinese Marquis Yi of Zeng is buried (approximate date) with lavish tomb items including a 65 set of bronze bells (bianzhong) with five octave musical scale and two musical tones that can be produced by each bell. Marquis Yi was from the State of Chu during the Warring States phase of the Zhou dynasty.

==== By topic ====
====== Astronomy ======
- Meton of Athens, a Greek mathematician and astronomer, calculates accurately the comparative chronology of the solar and lunar cycles. As a result, he introduces the 19-year Metonic cycle into the Athenian calendar as a method of calculating dates. Working with Euctemon, he observes the summer solstice on 27 June.

====== Architecture ======
- Pheidias completes the sculptures that form the decoration of the Parthenon in Athens.

=== 431 BC ===
==== By place ====
====== Greece ======
- Athens enters into an alliance with King Sitalkes of Thrace, after Nymphodorus, an influential Athenian, marries Sitalkes' sister. Nymphodorus then negotiates an agreement between Athens and Macedon's King Perdiccas II, through which Perdiccas regains Therma. As a result, Athens withdraws its support for Perdiccas' brother, Philip, and the Thracians promise to assist Perdiccas in capturing him. In return, Perdiccas marches on the Chalcidians, the people he has originally persuaded to revolt.
- A Theban raid on Plataea, the only pro-Athenian city in Boeotia, is a failure and the Plataeans take 180 prisoners and put them to death. Athens supports Plataea while Sparta aligns itself with Thebes. Sparta enlists the help of the Greek cities in Italy and Sicily. Both Sparta and Athens appeal to Persia, but without result.
- The Spartans, led by King Archidamus II, invade Attica effectively starting the first phase of the Peloponnesian War, actually the second of such wars, between the Athens-led Delian League and the Sparta-led Peloponnesian League. The Spartans lay waste to the countryside around Athens. Athenian leader, Pericles, does not seriously oppose them, rather withdrawing the rural population of the country districts within Athens' city walls. Instead, he pursues active naval warfare and reduces any danger from the island of Aegina by replacing its native population with Athenians.
- The Athenian fleet raids the Peloponnese and pilages the area around Methone. The town is saved through an intervention by the Spartan general Brasidas. The Athenians then sail on laying waste to the coastal areas of the western Peloponnese.

====== Roman Republic ======
- The Romans defeat the Aequi and the Volsci at the battle of Mount Algidus.

==== By topic ====
====== Science ======
- The Greek philosopher Empedocles distinguishes the four elements - earth, fire, water, and air - that he claims all substances are made of. He explains the development of the universe by the forces of attraction and repulsion known as Love and Strife.

====== Literature ======
- Euripides' play Medea wins third prize at the Dionysia, the famous Athenian dramatic festival.

=== 430 BC ===
==== By place ====
====== Greece ======
- The army of Sparta loots Attica for a second time, but Pericles is not daunted and refuses to revise his initial strategy. Unwilling to engage the Spartan army in battle, he again leads a naval expedition to plunder the coasts of the Peloponnesus, this time taking 100 Athenian ships with him.
- Potidaea finally capitulates to the siege by Athenian forces in the winter.
- An outbreak of a plague hits Athens and the disease ravages the densely packed city (modern DNA analyses of material from ancient cemeteries suggest the mortal disease may have been typhus). The plague wipes out over 30,000 citizens, sailors, and soldiers as well as Pericles' two sons. Roughly one-quarter of the Athenian population dies. The fear of plague is so widespread that the Spartan invasion of Attica is abandoned, their troops being unwilling to risk contact with the diseased enemy.
- Pericles becomes ill from the plague but he recovers, temporarily. He is deposed from his position as General (or Strategos) but is later reappointed.

==== By topic ====
====== Art ======
- Polyclitus completes one of his greatest statues, the Diadumenos (Diadem-bearer).
- Approximate date – Sophocles' drama Oedipus Rex is first performed in Athens.

====== Religion ======
- Traditional date where scholars believe the Hebrew prophet known as Malachi writes the 39th and last book, and last of the prophetic books, of the Old Testament of the Biblical canon, the Book of Malachi. Biblical books written between now and the millennium will not be included in the Hebrew Bible and in some Christian traditions considered Biblical apocrypha.

== Births ==
436 BC

- Isocrates, Athenian orator (d. 338 BC)
- Artaxerxes II, king of Persia (approximate date) (d. 358 BC)

435 BC

- Philoxenus of Cythera, Greek dithyrambic poet (d. 380 BC)

432 BC

- Dionysius, tyrant of Syracuse (d. 367 BC) (approximate birth date)

431 BC

- Xenophon, Athenian Greek mercenary and writer (d. c. 354 BC)

== Deaths ==
439 BC

- Spurius Maelius - was the youngest man to ever attempt taking over Rome

438 BC

- Cincinnatus, Roman politician, consul and dictator (b. 519 BC)

436 BC

- Zengcius, Chinese philosopher (b. 505 BC)

434 BC

- Duke Jing of Jin

433 BC

- Zeng Hou Yi, marquis of the state of Zeng, subordinate to Chu

431 BC

- Phidias returns to Athens, where he is imprisoned (for having been portrayed on the shield of the statue of the goddess Athena) and dies before the trial.

430 BC

- Empedocles, Greek philosopher (approximate date) (b. c. 490 BC)
- Phidias, Greek sculptor (approximate date) (b. c. 480 BC)
- Zeno of Elea, Greek philosopher (approximate date) (b. c. 490 BC)
