= Tinde (ancient Macedonia) =

Tinde (Ancient Greek: Τίνδη), also known as Tindium or Tindion (Τίνδιον), was a town of Chalcidice in ancient Macedonia. It belonged to the Delian League since it appears in the tribute registry of Athens for the year 434/3 BCE, where it paid a phoros of 3000 drachmas jointly with the cities of Cithas, Gigonus, Smila and Lisaea.

Its site is unlocated, but probably in Bottiaea.
