= 432 BC =

432 BC in various calendars
Gregorian calendar	432 BC; CDXXXII BC
Ab urbe condita	322
Ancient Egypt era	XXVII dynasty, 94
Pharaoh	Artaxerxes I of Persia, 34
Ancient Greek Olympiad (summer)	87th Olympiad (victor)¹
Assyrian calendar	4319
Balinese saka calendar	N/A
Bengali calendar	−1025 – −1024
Berber calendar	519
Buddhist calendar	113
Burmese calendar	−1069
Byzantine calendar	5077–5078
Chinese calendar	戊申年 (Earth Monkey); 2266 or 2059 — to — 己酉年 (Earth Rooster); 2267 or 2060
Coptic calendar	−715 – −714
Discordian calendar	735
Ethiopian calendar	−439 – −438
Hebrew calendar	3329–3330
- Hindu calendars
Vikram Samvat	−375 – −374
Shaka Samvat	N/A
Kali Yuga	2669–2670
Holocene calendar	9569
Iranian calendar	1053 BP – 1052 BP
Islamic calendar	1085 BH – 1084 BH
Javanese calendar	N/A
Julian calendar	N/A
Korean calendar	1902
Minguo calendar	2343 before ROC 民前2343年
Nanakshahi calendar	−1899
Thai solar calendar	111–112
Tibetan calendar	ས་ཕོ་སྤྲེ་ལོ་ (male Earth-Monkey) −305 or −686 or −1458 — to — ས་མོ་བྱ་ལོ་ (female Earth-Bird) −304 or −685 or −1457

Year 432 BC was a year of the pre-Julian Roman calendar. At the time, it was known as the Year of the Tribunate of Mamercus, Albinus and Medullinus (or, less frequently, year 322 Ab urbe condita). The denomination 432 BC for this year has been used since the early medieval period, when the Anno Domini calendar era became the prevalent method in Europe for naming years.

== Events ==
=== By place ===
==== Greece ====
- Sparta calls and hosts a conference of the Peloponnesian League. The conference is attended by Athenian representatives as well as members of the League. Following arguments by Corinth against Athens, a majority of the League members vote to declare that the Athenians had broken the peace.
- The Athenian admiral, Phormio, continues the siege of Potidaea by blocking the entrance to the Gulf of Corinth. Meanwhile an Athenian fleet, led by Archestratus, sails for Potidaea. However, instead of attacking Potidaea, they attack the Macedonians under Perdiccas II, who have allied with the Potidaeans. The Athenians capture Therma (modern Thessalonica) and then go on to besiege Pydna. However, as the Athenians are besieging Pydna, they receive news that Corinth has sent a force under the command of Aristeus to support Potidaea. In response, Athens sends more troops and ships under the command of Hipponicus. The combined Athenian force sails to Potidaea and lands there. In the ensuing Battle of Potidaea, the Athenians are victorious against Corinth and its allies.

==== Italy ====
- The Greek colony of Heraclea in Southern Italy is founded by colonists from Tarentum and Thurii.

==== China ====
- The Chinese Marquis Yi of Zeng is buried (approximate date) with lavish tomb items including a 65 set of bronze bells (bianzhong) with five octave musical scale and two musical tones that can be produced by each bell. Marquis Yi was from the State of Chu during the Warring States phase of the Zhou dynasty.

=== By topic ===
==== Astronomy ====
- Meton of Athens, a Greek mathematician and astronomer, calculates accurately the comparative chronology of the solar and lunar cycles. As a result, he introduces the 19-year Metonic cycle into the Athenian calendar as a method of calculating dates. Working with Euctemon, he observes the summer solstice on 27 June.

==== Architecture ====
- Pheidias completes the sculptures that form the decoration of the Parthenon in Athens.

== Births ==
- Dionysius, tyrant of Syracuse (d. 367 BC) (approximate birth date)
