= Crusis =

Coordinates: 40.35°N 23.10°E

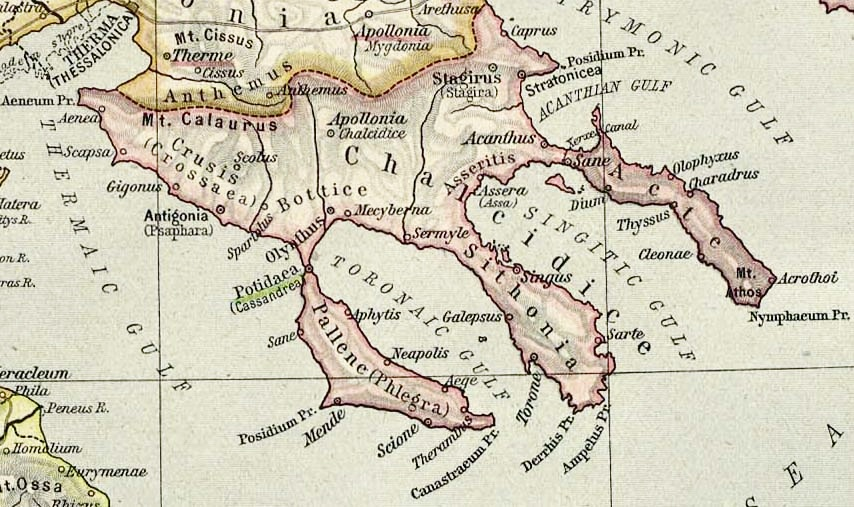
Crusis in North-West Chalcidice

Crusis or Crousis (Latin: Crusaea or Crossaea) was called a maritime district of North-West Chalcidice from Potidaea to the Thermaic Gulf. It was named after Crusis the son of Mygdon. The cities of Crusis were: Lipaxus, Combreia, Lisaea, Gigonus, Campsa, Smila, Aeneia and later Antigonia Psaphara.
