= Campsa (Macedonia) =

Ancient Greek polis in Macedonia

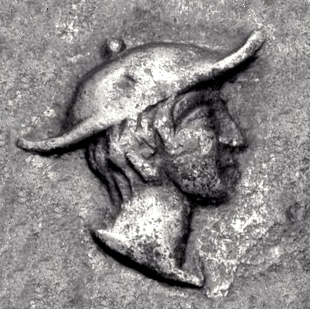
Hermes wearing Petasos. Coinage of Kapsa, Macedon, circa 400 BC

Location of Kapsa

Campsa or Kampsa (Ancient Greek: Κάμψα) was an ancient Greek polis (city-state) in the Chalcidice, ancient Macedonia. It is cited by Herodotus as one of the cities—together with Lipaxus, Combreia, Lisaea, Gigonus, Smila, Aeneia—located in the vicinity of the Thermaic Gulf, in a region called Crusis near the peninsula of Pallene where Xerxes recruited troops in his expedition of the year 480 BCE against Greece.

Other names borne by the city were Scapsa or Skapsa (Σκάψα), under which name it appears on Athenian tribute lists from 452/1 BCE, and Capsa or Kapsa (Κάψα). The city was a member of the Chalcidian League.

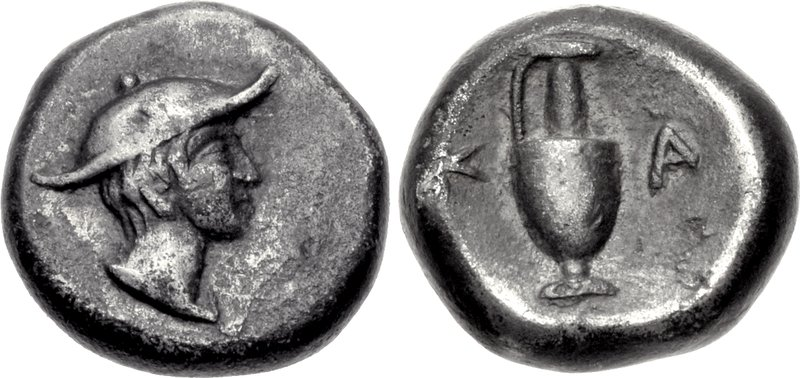
Coinage of Kapsa, Macedon, circa 400 BC

Its site is unlocated, but is sometimes considered to be near the silver mines 12 miles E-S-E of Thessaloniki.
