= Cithas =

Town in ancient Macedonia

Coordinates: 40°23′48″N 23°03′21″E

Cithas or Kithas (Ancient Greek: Κίθας) was a town of Chalcidice in ancient Macedonia. It belonged to the Delian League since it appears in the tribute registry of Athens for the year 434/3 BCE, where it paid a phoros of 3000 drachmas jointly with the cities of Tinde, Gigonus, Smila and Lisaea.

The location of its site is disputed: the editors of the Barrington Atlas of the Greek and Roman World treat Cithas as located at the site of Cissus; whereas, Mogens Herman Hansen and his colleagues treat Cithas as unlocated.

Accepting the identification, its site is located in the western Chalcidice.
