= Aristeus =

5th century BCE Corinthian general

Aristeus (Ancient Greek: Ἀριστεύς), son of Adeimantus (Ἀδείμαντος; Adeímantos), was a Corinthian general who commanded the expedition to Potidaea in 432 BC. After the Athenians broke a truce with the Corinthians at Sybota, his primary goal was to defend Potidaea from an Athenian attack. He then went on to defend the Corinthian colony from Athens during the Battle of Potidaea in 432 BC, until he was left with no option but to leave the colony with the Chalcidians. In 430 BC he traveled to Thrace with Spartan envoys where they were discovered by Athenians and brought to Athens, by Athenian ambassadors, where they were promptly killed without a trial. After Aristeus' death, Athens seized Potidaea in 430/429 BC during the Peloponnesian War, the battles of Sybota and Potidaea being two main catalysts for the war.

== Prelude to war ==
In 432 BC, Aristeus was appointed as commander of the Corinthian military expedition for the relief of their colony Potidaea, which had just seceded from Athens. He was able to recruit Corinthian volunteers and mercenaries from the rest of the Peloponnesus to fight alongside him due to his popularity, both domestically and in Potidaea. After the Battle of Sybota, in which the Corinthians fought a combined force of Athenians and Corcyraeans in 433 BC, Corinth was furious with the Athenians for fighting alongside Corcyraeans during a time of truce.

The Athenians became worried that Potidaea would revolt against Athens and immediately sought to win over Corinth. Forty days after the revolt in Potidaea, Aristeus, along with 1600 hoplites and 400 light troops, arrived in Thrace and shortly thereafter encamped at Olynthus, where they prepared for battle.

== Battle of Potidaea ==
Meanwhile Athens, informed that Aristeus and his troops were on their way to defend Potidaea, sent 2000 hoplites along with 40 ships to prepare to oppose him. Under the command of the general Callias and four of his colleagues, the Athenian troops first traveled to Macedonia, where they besieged Pydna. It was at this time that Athens, realizing the revolt in Potidaea and Aristeus' intention to defend it, forced Perdiccas, the Macedonian king, to return to his alliance with them and march on Potidaea. With the alliance with Perdiccas formalized, Athens withdrew its troops from Macedonia, via Beroea and Strepsa, and marched on Potidaea with 3000 hoplites and 600 Macedonian horsemen, with 70 ships following closely along the coast. After three days of advancing on Potidaea by short marches, the Athenian forces encamped at Gigonus.

In their preparation for the Athenian attack on their city, the citizens of Potidaea and the Peloponnesians encamped at Olynthus and chose Aristeus as general of all the infantry. Perdiccas, who had deputed Iolaus as his general, left the alliance with Athens, returned to that with Potidaea, and was made commander of the allied cavalry. Aristeus' next move was to keep his infantrymen on the isthmus to await the Athenian attack. The Chalcidians and the other allies waited nearby, while the 200 cavalry from Perdiccas stayed in Olynthus to attack the Athenian rear, in case of an attack on Aristeus' infantry. By doing this, Aristeus placed the Athenian advance between the allied forces on the isthmus and at Olynthus. Knowing that Aristeus' infantry posed a threat to the Athenian advance, Callias and his colleagues sent away the Macedonian horsemen and a group of allies to prevent an attack from Olynthus, while the rest of the Athenians marched on Potidaea.

Shortly after the Athenians arrived at the isthmus, the armies engaged. Aristeus' infantry, which consisted of Corinthians and other chosen men, routed the Athenian advance and pursued them for a considerable distance. However, the remaining army of Potidaeans and Peloponnesians met a different fate; they were routed by the Athenians and were forced to take refuge behind fortifications. When he returned from pursuing the Athenians, Aristeus realized the defeat of the rest of the army and was left to choose whether to go to Olynthus or to Potidaea. Once his men were assembled, Aristeus led them along the breakwater to Potidaea, while being attacked. Some perished, but most made it safely.

Seeing this occur and battle signals raised, Potidaean allies from Olynthus began to advance to provide aid. The Macedonian horsemen successfully countered those troops. Predicting an Athenian victory, the Potidaeans retreated back within their walls, while the Macedonians, having seen the battle signals taken down, retreated to the Athenians, leaving no cavalry on either side. When the battle concluded, the Athenians set up a trophy and, under truce, allowed the Potidaeans to collect their dead, which numbered nearly 300. The Athenians lost 150 men, including their general, Callias.

== After the battle ==
After the battle of Potidaea ended, Athenians built a wall on the Macedonian side of the isthmus, consolidating their forces there and leaving the Pallene side unmanned. Under the command of Phormio, 1600 hoplites were sent from Athens for reinforcement. Upon their arrival at Pallene, a new Athenian headquarters was constructed at Aphytis. Phormio's troops defeated the Potidaeans in the field, built a wall on the Pallene side, and deployed Athenian ships around the peninsula, thus besieging Potidaea by land and sea. Aristeus recognized that the peninsula was unsalvageable and instructed the remaining troops, except for 500 of them, to sail away. He attempted to convince his troops to let him stay in Potidaea but was not successful. After evading Athenian ships, he sailed away. Although the conflict was all but finished, Aristeus remained with the Chalcidians and successfully ambushed Athenians near Aphytis. In an attempt to buy mercenaries to fight for him, he was in communication with the Peloponnesus. Phormio ended the siege of Potidaea by sending his 1600 hoplites to destroy Chalcidice and Bottica. Athenians and Peloponnesians continued to debate their claim to Potidaea; their conflict on the isthmus would be a precursor to the Peloponnesian War.

== Death ==
In the summer of 430 BC, Aristeus, along with a group of Spartans—including Aneristus, Nicolaus, Protodamus, Timagoras from Tegea, and Pollis from Argos—traveled to Thrace to meet Sitalces, the son of the former Thracian king, Teres I, in an attempt to persuade the king to supply funds and betray his alliance to Athens. In particular, they wanted Sitalces' assistance to march yet again on Potidaea, which was occupied by Athenian forces, and to join them in the war against Athens. Athenian ambassadors happened to be with Sitalces at the time, and they convinced his son, Sadocus, to seize Aristeus and the other individuals as they traveled through Thrace to the ship in which they were to cross the Hellespont. It followed that Aristeus and the other individuals were handed over to the Athenian ambassadors and brought to Athens. When they arrived back in Athens, the Athenians were aware that Aristeus had commanded the Corinthians and others at Potidaea and refused to give them a trial, being afraid that, if he escaped, Aristeus would cause them to suffer again. Aristeus and the other envoys were killed immediately and cast into a pit, a familiar mode of death that the Spartans themselves were known for in the Peloponnesian War. In 430 BC, Potidaea was seized by Athens.
