= Scithae =

Coordinates: 40°23′48″N 23°03′21″E

Scithae or Skithai (Ancient Greek: Σκίθαι) was a town of Chalcidice in ancient Macedonia. It is cited in a fragment of Theopompus collected by Stephanus of Byzantium, which locates it in Thrace, in the vicinity of Potidaea. The city also appears on coins; Scithaean silver coins dated around the year 500 BCE have been preserved.

It has been suggested that Scithae is the same place as Kithas, which suggestion is accepted by the editors of the Barrington Atlas of the Greek and Roman World.

Accepting the identification, its site is located in the western Chalcidice.
