= Lipaxus =

City-state in ancient Macedonia

Lipaxus or Lipaxos (Ancient Greek: Λίπαξος) was an ancient Greek polis (city-state) in the Chalcidice, ancient Macedonia. It is cited by Herodotus as one of the cities—together with Combreia, Lisaea, Gigonus, Campsa, Smila, Aeneia—located in the vicinity of the Thermaic Gulf, in a region called Crusis near the peninsula of Pallene, where Xerxes recruited troops in his expedition of the year 480 BCE against Greece.

Its site is unlocated.
