= Antigonia Psaphara =

Ancient city in Chalcidice, Greece

Coordinates: 40°22′48″N 23°03′12″E

Antigonia Psaphara or Antigoneia Psaphara (Ancient Greek: Ἀντιγόνεια Ψαφαρά), or simply Antigonia, Antigonea, or Antigoneia (Ἀντιγόνεια) was a Hellenistic city in Macedon in the district Crusis (Krousis) in Chalcidice, placed by Livy between Aeneia and Pallene. It is called Psaphara by Ptolemy probably in order to distinguish it from Antigonia in Paeonia.

The site of Antigonia Psaphara is about 3 miles (5 km) north of Nea Kallikratia.
