= Gods in the Odyssey =

The Odyssean gods are the ancient Greek gods referenced in Homer's Odyssey.

The story's major gods include Athena, Poseidon, Calypso and Circe; minor gods include Ino, Hermes, Zeus, and Heracles.

== Major gods ==
The Odyssey's major gods include Athena, Poseidon, Calypso, and Circe.

=== Athena ===
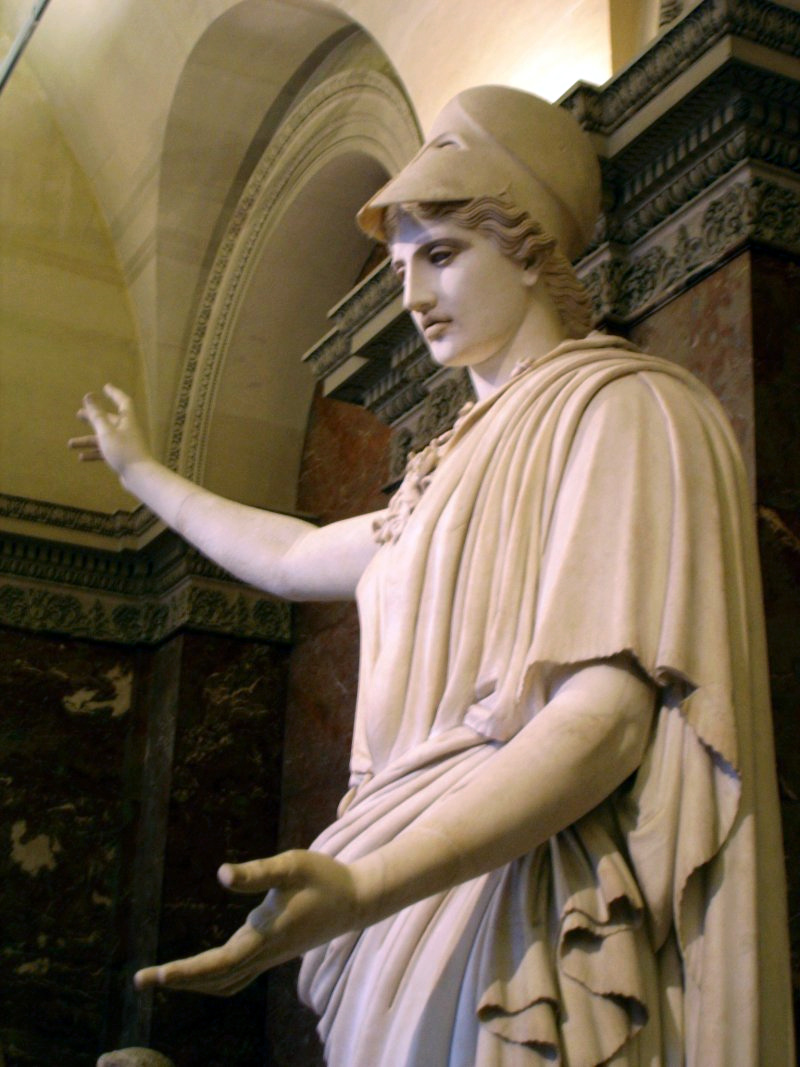
Helmeted Athena, of the Velletri type. Roman copy (1st century) of a Greek original by Kresilas, c. 430 BC

Athena is the Greek goddess of wisdom and battle strategy, and was also the patron goddess of heroes. Odysseus was a great hero among the Greeks, and so had Athena’s favor and aid in many of his exploits. She was a key goddess in the story of the Odyssey as a divine assistant to Odysseus on his journey home.

From the very beginning of the Odyssey, Athena is helping Odysseus. Her first act that the readers see is persuading Zeus to send Hermes to Ogygia, Calypso's island, to inform her that it is Zeus’s will that Odysseus continues his journey home. Seeing as no god can thwart or evade Zeus, Calypso is forced to let Odysseus go despite her own wishes to have him stay on the island forever. Athena also secures Odysseus' future through other characters, such as the Phaeacian Princess Nausicaa. In Book 6, she makes sure that Nausicaa meets Odysseus elsewhere on the island by coming to her in a dream and inciting her to go to the river to wash clothes. Odysseus is in a horrid state of nudity and grime when he initially meets Nausicaa, but Athena gives Nausicaa the courage to stand her ground so that she can get around to helping him.

Athena also does minor things to help out Odysseus, such as improving his appearances so that he is respected by other characters. An example of direct assistance by Athena includes when she leads Odysseus to the Phaeacian palace in the disguise of a beggar. She also helps him by transforming him into an old beggar in the later books of the Odyssey, by planting helpful ideas into his head and by causing the javelins of the suitors to miss their target when Odysseus finally engages them in book 22.

=== Poseidon ===
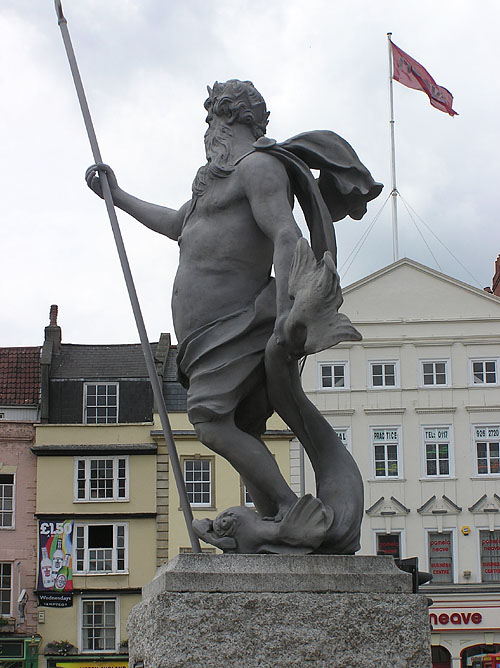
A statue of Neptune in the city of Bristol.

Poseidon is the Greek god of the sea and the brother of Zeus, Hades, Hera, Hestia and Demeter. Beckoned by the curse of Polyphemus, his one-eyed giant son, he attempts to make Odysseus' journey home much harder than it actually needs to be. He appears to be very spiteful in the Odyssey and actively causes problems for Odysseus on sight. Although he cannot kill Odysseus, as it is his destiny to return home, he makes every effort to make Odysseus suffer.

Odysseus earned Poseidon’s wrath by blinding Polyphemus. While the blinding alone may have been justifiable for the poor mistreatment by Polyphemus to his guests, Odysseus's pride was really what incurred Poseidon’s wrath. As Odysseus was leaving the island of the Cyclops behind, and talked down on Polyphemus and accused him of being impious. Polyphemus exclaimed that he was the son of Poseidon, yet Odysseus did not believe him. To prove that he was indeed the son of Poseidon, Polyphemus called out to his father commanding that Odysseus never reach his home.

In the Odyssey, Poseidon is a powerful and respected elder god, as none of the other Olympian gods dare to mention Odysseus and his predicaments whilst Poseidon is there to hear it. The council of gods that decided to set Odysseus free from Calypso’s island was held when Poseidon was accepting a sacrifice in Ethiopia. Athena, out of respect for her uncle, does not show her support to Odysseus whilst Poseidon is around. When Odysseus set sail away from Calypso’s island, Poseidon spotted him and caused him to become shipwrecked. In this way, Poseidon is seen to be a very direct god in that he instantly causes problems for Odysseus himself instead of working through other means like the goddess Athena.

=== Calypso and Circe ===
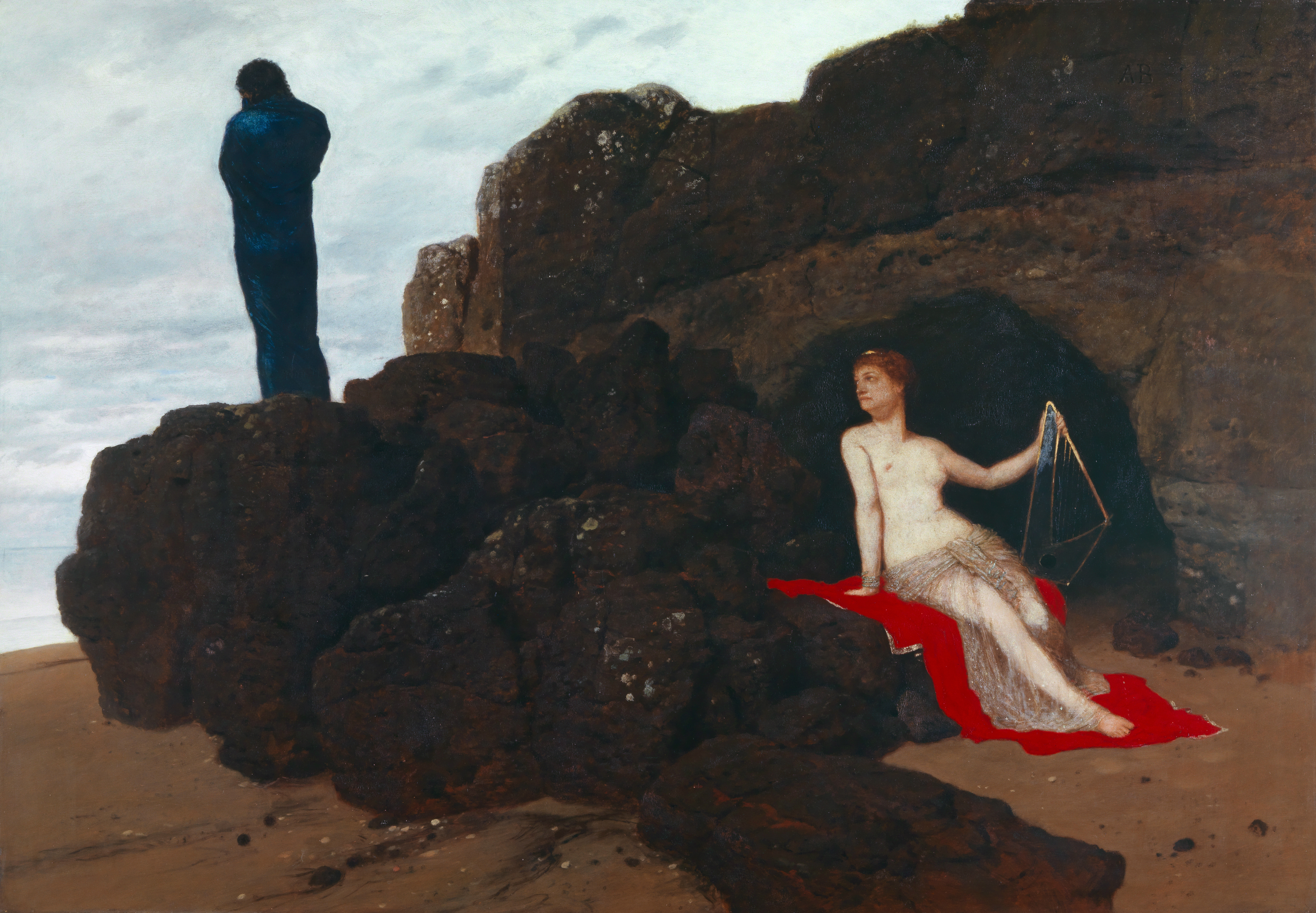
"Now he's left to pine on an island, wracked with grief" (Odyssey V): Calypso and Odysseus, by Arnold Böcklin, 1883

Two interesting goddesses in the Odyssey are Calypso and Circe, who both show friendly and hostile reactions toward Odysseus.

Calypso rescued Odysseus after his ship and crew were destroyed by the storm created by Zeus after Odysseus's crew killed Helios's sun cattle, even after a warning from Circe. She tended to his needs on her isolated island and made him her lover. In total, Calypso held Odysseus captive on her island for seven years and she hoped for him to stay there with her forever as her husband. Seeing as Calypso was a daughter of a Titan, Odysseus could not argue or resist the goddess’ desires and it took the divine intervention of Zeus to ensure Odysseus passage onto his next destination. While appearing hostile towards Odysseus in her deeds of keeping him captive on her isle for so long against his will, Calypso does genuinely care for Odysseus. She feeds and shelters him and allows him to wander the isle at his own will. She does not bear him any ill-will as he is preparing to leave her island and helps him out by showing the best places to obtain wood from her island for his ship and provides the tools for constructing it. Calypso can be seen to be a friendly goddess, but a bit sharp-tongued too. When she learns that she must release Odysseus, she criticizes the gods and how they are able to have affairs and sleep with mortal women whilst Goddesses suffer consequences if their intentions are not as pure.

Circe, like Calypso, is also a goddess found in an isolated location, with her house among dense woodland. Circe is initially hostile to Odysseus and his men and attempts to turn them all to pigs with a potion slipped into the wine with honey she offers them, but with Hermes' aid, Odysseus is able to enter her abode and pacify her. She returns all of Odysseus’ men to their natural state and offers them food and hospitality for one year. Unlike Calypso, Circe appears to be quite unemotional with Odysseus. She is of great help to him and his homeward journey.

== Minor gods ==
There are other gods in the Odyssey that play minor roles in aiding Odysseus’ homeward journey. Because of their small role, there is very little that can be said about them.

=== Ino ===
It isn't known why Ino helps him, but she does. Ino gives Odysseus a magical veil that keeps him buoyant after Poseidon (god of the sea) sinks his ship. She leads him toward the land of the Phaecians, where Nausicaa and Arete help him to get back to Ithaca – after he has told them the story of his 'odyssey' between the war at Troy and his reaching Scherie (also known as Phaeacia – land of the Phaecians).

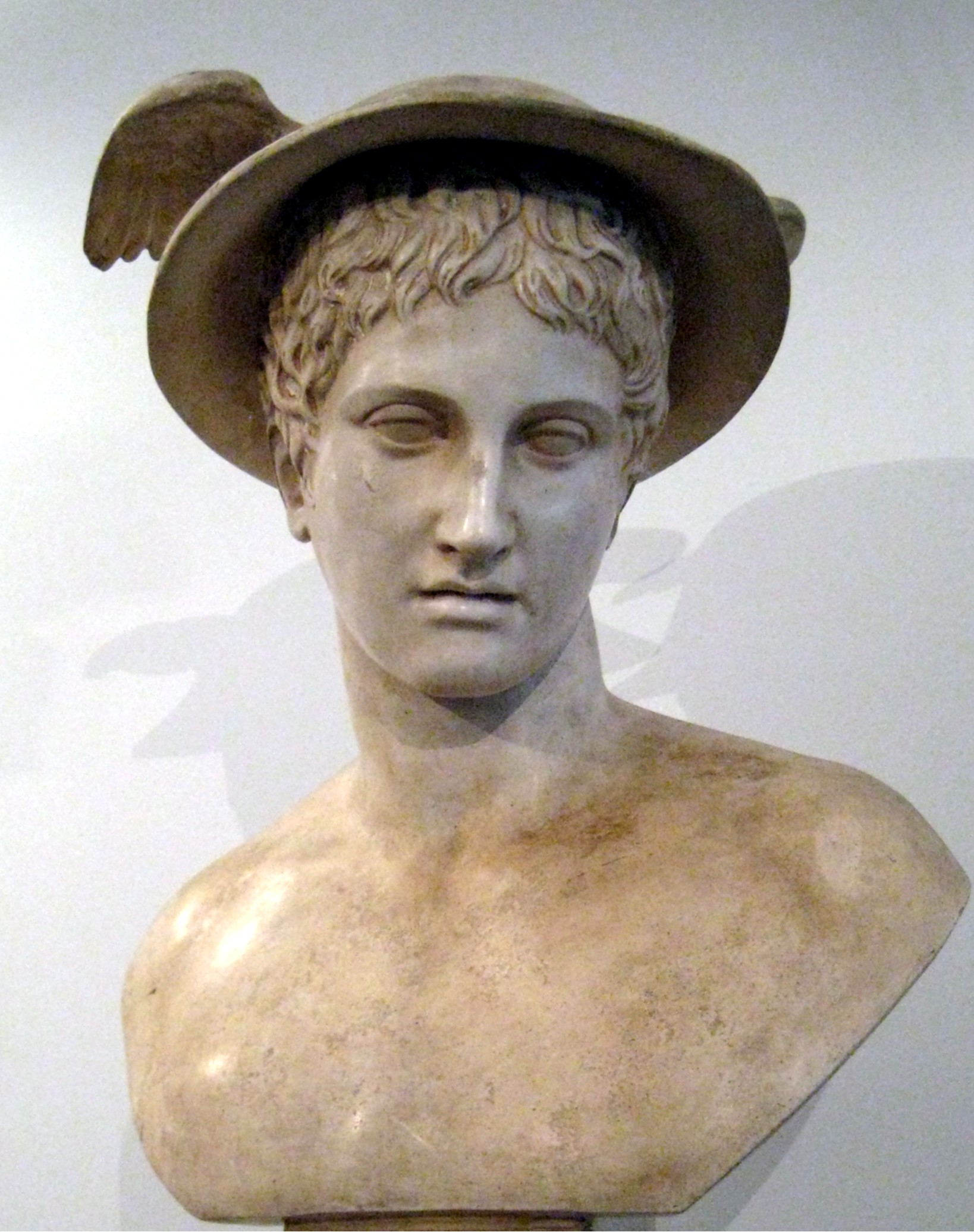
Winged Hermes; Pushkin Museum in Moscow, Russia

=== Hermes ===
Hermes is one of the Twelve Olympians, herald of the gods, protector of human heralds, travelers, thieves, merchants, and orators. He appears thrice in the Odyssey. The first time is to deliver a message to Calypso to let Odysseus return home. Later, he appears to Odysseus to warn him about Circe and provides the necessary information that Odysseus needed to put Circe into submission. The third time he is sent to escort the spirits of the suitors from the halls of Odysseus's home to the underworld. Hermes is the great-grandfather of Odysseus.

=== Zeus ===
Zeus does very little in the Odyssey, aside from passing judgements and sending omens. He is the King of the gods and is the god of thunder, lightning, the sky, and the patron of xenia as well as oaths. He appears at the beginning of the Odyssey where he complains that men blame the gods for the results of their own actions. He is persuaded by Athena in book 1 to send Hermes to prompt Calypso into letting Odysseus leave Ogygia; and in book 12, at Helios' request, he sends a storm to punish Odysseus' men for killing the cattle on his island (they also swore that they would not touch the cows so in addition offended Zeus in his role as keeper of oaths). Arguably, the entire plot of the Odyssey revolves around the suitors' actions as bad guests which offend Zeus in his role as patron of xenia. Zeus also permits Poseidon to punish the Phaeacians for their assistance of Odysseus.

=== Heracles ===
Odysseus meets Heracles in the Underworld and mentions that it was only his ghost as his immortal half was sent to Olympus where they married Hebe.

=== Aeolus ===
A god in the Odyssey, Aeolus is keeper of the Winds. Aeolus gives Odysseus a tightly closed bag full of the captured winds so he could sail easily home to Ithaca. After their failure, Aeolus refused to provide any further help, because he believed that their short and unsuccessful voyage meant that the gods did not favor them.

=== Helios ===
God of the Sun, and in some translations called Hyperion, Helios' cattle are impiously killed and eaten by Odysseus' crew. The guardians of the island, Helios' daughters, tell their father about this. Helios appeals to Zeus telling him to dispose of Odysseus' men or he will go down to the Underworld and shine among the dead. Zeus destroys the ship with his lightning bolt, killing all the men except for Odysseus.

== See also ==
- Greek gods
- Homer's Ithaca
- Odyssean Wicca, a Wiccan tradition created in Toronto, Ontario, Canada in the late 1970s
