= Smilla =

Smilla may refer to:

== People ==
- Smilla Holmberg (born 2006), Swedish professional footballer
- Smilla Tarning Sønderby (born 2000), Danish professional golfer
- Smilla Sundell (born 2004), Swedish Muay Thai kickboxer
- Smilla Vallotto (born 2004), Swiss professional footballer

=== Fictional characters ===
- Smilla Jaspersen, a fictional character in the 1992 novel Miss Smilla's Feeling for Snow and its adaptations

== Other uses ==
- Smila (Macedonia), a place in ancient Macedonia, also spelt Smilla
