= Gigonus =

Ancient Greek state

Coordinates: 40°19′35″N 23°01′22″E

Gigonus or Gigonos (Ancient Greek: Γίγωνος) was an ancient Greek polis (city-state) in the Chalcidice, ancient Macedonia. It is cited by Herodotus as one of the cities—together with Lipaxus, Combreia, Lisaea, Campsa, Smila, Aeneia—located in the vicinity of the Thermaic Gulf, in a region called Crusis near the peninsula of Pallene, where Xerxes recruited troops in his expedition of the year 480 BCE against Greece.

Subsequently the city belonged to the Delian League since it appears on a tribute list to Athens in 434/3 BCE. Gigonus is also cited by Thucydides as the place where the Athenians, under the command of Callias, established a camp in the year 432 BCE when they were heading against Potidaea.

The site of Gigonus is located near modern Nea Kallikrateia.
