= 367th Division =

367th Division may refer to:

- 367th Infantry Division, Wehrmacht, Germany
- 367th Rifle Division, Soviet Union

== See also ==
- List of military divisions by number
- 367th (disambiguation)
