= AESA =

Aesa was a town of ancient Macedonia. Aesa may also refer to:

- Aesa, a genus of beetles in the subfamily Prioninae

AESA may refer to:

- Active electronically scanned array
- Aerolíneas de El Salvador, a former Salvadoran airline
- American Educational Studies Association
- Spanish Aviation Safety and Security Agency, Agencia Española de Seguridad Aérea
