= 518 BC =

518 BC in various calendars
| Gregorian calendar | 518 BC; DXVIII BC |
| Ab urbe condita | 236 |
| Ancient Egypt era | XXVII dynasty, 8 |
| Pharaoh | Darius I of Persia, 4 |
| Ancient Greek Olympiad (summer) | 65th Olympiad, year 3 |
| Assyrian calendar | 4233 |
| Balinese saka calendar | N/A |
| Bengali calendar | −1111 – −1110 |
| Berber calendar | 433 |
| Buddhist calendar | 27 |
| Burmese calendar | −1155 |
| Byzantine calendar | 4991–4992 |
| Chinese calendar | 壬午年 (Water Horse); 2180 or 1973 — to — 癸未年 (Water Goat); 2181 or 1974 |
| Coptic calendar | −801 – −800 |
| Discordian calendar | 649 |
| Ethiopian calendar | −525 – −524 |
| Hebrew calendar | 3243–3244 |
- Hindu calendars
| Vikram Samvat | −461 – −460 |
| Shaka Samvat | N/A |
| Kali Yuga | 2583–2584 |
| Holocene calendar | 9483 |
| Iranian calendar | 1139 BP – 1138 BP |
| Islamic calendar | 1174 BH – 1173 BH |
| Javanese calendar | N/A |
| Julian calendar | N/A |
| Korean calendar | 1816 |
| Minguo calendar | 2429 before ROC 民前2429年 |
| Nanakshahi calendar | −1985 |
| Thai solar calendar | 25–26 |
| Tibetan calendar | ཆུ་ཕོ་རྟ་ལོ་ (male Water-Horse) −391 or −772 or −1544 — to — ཆུ་མོ་ལུག་ལོ་ (female Water-Sheep) −390 or −771 or −1543 |

The year 518 BC was a year of the pre-Julian Roman calendar. In the Roman Empire, it was known as year 236 Ab urbe condita. The denomination 518 BC for this year has been used since the early medieval period, when the Anno Domini calendar era became the prevalent method in Europe for naming years.

== Events ==
=== By topic ===
==== Architecture ====
- Darius I begins constructing Persepolis, a new capital for the Persian Empire (approximate date).
- Construction begins on the Apadana (audience hall) of Darius and Xerxes, ceremonial complex, at Persepolis, Persia.

== Births ==
- Pindar, Greek lyric poet (approximate date) (d. 438 BC)
- Xerxes I of Persia (or 519 BC)
