= 438 BC =

438 BC in various calendars
Gregorian calendar	438 BC; CDXXXVIII BC
Ab urbe condita	316
Ancient Egypt era	XXVII dynasty, 88
Pharaoh	Artaxerxes I of Persia, 28
Ancient Greek Olympiad (summer)	85th Olympiad, year 3
Assyrian calendar	4313
Balinese saka calendar	N/A
Bengali calendar	−1031 – −1030
Berber calendar	513
Buddhist calendar	107
Burmese calendar	−1075
Byzantine calendar	5071–5072
Chinese calendar	壬寅年 (Water Tiger); 2260 or 2053 — to — 癸卯年 (Water Rabbit); 2261 or 2054
Coptic calendar	−721 – −720
Discordian calendar	729
Ethiopian calendar	−445 – −444
Hebrew calendar	3323–3324
- Hindu calendars
Vikram Samvat	−381 – −380
Shaka Samvat	N/A
Kali Yuga	2663–2664
Holocene calendar	9563
Iranian calendar	1059 BP – 1058 BP
Islamic calendar	1092 BH – 1091 BH
Javanese calendar	N/A
Julian calendar	N/A
Korean calendar	1896
Minguo calendar	2349 before ROC 民前2349年
Nanakshahi calendar	−1905
Thai solar calendar	105–106
Tibetan calendar	ཆུ་ཕོ་སྟག་ལོ་ (male Water-Tiger) −311 or −692 or −1464 — to — ཆུ་མོ་ཡོས་ལོ་ (female Water-Hare) −310 or −691 or −1463

Year 438 BC was a year of the pre-Julian Roman calendar. At the time, it was known as the Year of the Tribunate of Mamercinus, Iullus and Cincinnatus (or, less frequently, year 316 Ab urbe condita). The denomination 438 BC for this year has been used since the early medieval period, when the Anno Domini calendar era became the prevalent method in Europe for naming years.

== Events ==
=== By place ===
==== Greece ====
- The Parthenon on the Acropolis at Athens is completed by Ictinus and Callicrates and is consecrated after 9 years of construction. It is dedicated at the Panathenaea (a festival held in honour of Athena every four years on the Acropolis).
- The colossal statue of the Athena Parthenos, which Phidias has made for the Parthenon, is completed and dedicated. It is made of gold and ivory and stands some 12 metres high.
- Telephus, a play by the renowned playwright Euripides, is produced in Athens. This tragedy did not survive to modern times.

==== Italy ====
- The city of Capua falls to the Samnites.

=== By topic ===
==== Literature ====
- The Greek playwright Euripides' play Alcestis is performed in the Dionysia, an Athenian dramatic festival.

==== Art ====
- Three seated Goddesses (possibly Hestia, Dione and Aphrodite), from the east pediment of the Parthenon, are made (finished in 432 BC). They are now kept at The British Museum in London.
- The Ionic frieze on the north side of the Parthenon, is created (finished in 432 BC). Parts of this frieze are now preserved in museums in Europe, including the Horsemen (at the British Museum, London), and the Marshals and Young Women (now at Musée du Louvre, Paris), which once formed part of the Procession on the frieze.

== Deaths ==
- Cincinnatus, Roman politician, consul and dictator (b. 519 BC)
