= Strepsa =

Ancient city of Mygdonia, Macedon

Coordinates: 40°29′00″N 23°08′19″E

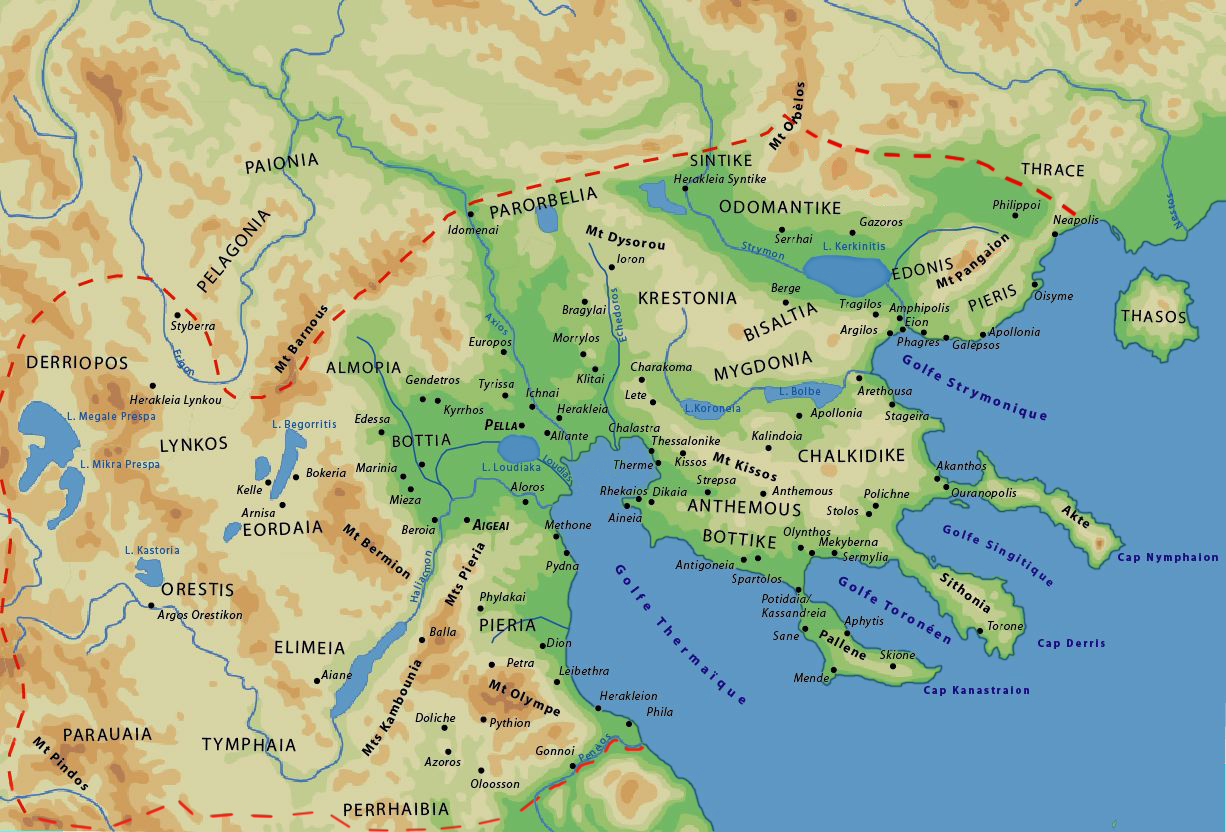
Macedonia and the Chalcidice

Strepsa (/ˈstrɛpsə/; Greek: Στρέψα) was an ancient city of Mygdonia, Macedon, near Therma, toward Chalcidice. The editors of the Barrington Atlas of the Greek and Roman World, tentatively identify Strepsa with the modern village of Basilika, in the municipality of Pylaia. Strepsa is mentioned by Thucydides (I.61.4). It was a member of the Delian League.
