= Megalo Embolo =

Cape in Central Macedonia, Greece

Coordinates: 40.5018431°N 22.814485°E

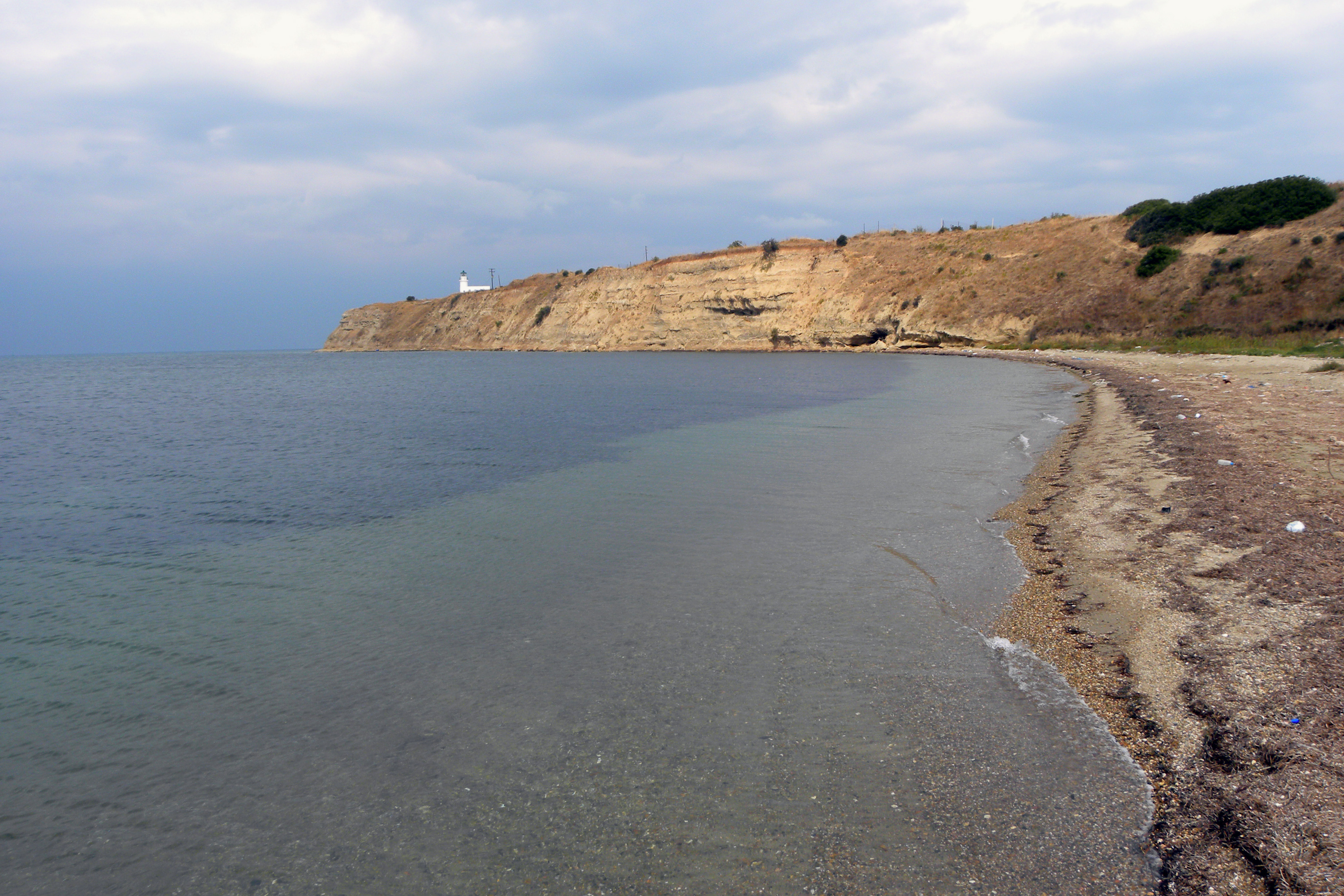
View of sea and lighthouse

Cape Megalo Embolo (Greek: Μεγάλο έμβολο, 'Great Point') or Karaburnu (Turkish 'Black Cape'), probably the ancient Aeneium or Aineion (Ancient Greek: Αἰνειῶν), is a cape southwest of Thessaloniki, Greece, located next to the village of Angelochori. There is a lighthouse.

The line from Megalo Embolo to the mouth of the Vardar/Axios is sometimes considered to define the entrance of the Thermaic Gulf.

Geographically, it is the westernmost point of the Halkidiki peninsula, although administratively it belongs to the regional unit of Thessaloniki.

It appears to correspond to the promontory of Aeneium described in the Periodos to Nicomedes of Pseudo-Scymnus, and was probably the site of the ancient city of Aenea.

The smaller cape Karabournaki, Mikro Karabournou, or Mikro Emvolo is found to its northeast.
