= Gallikos (river) =

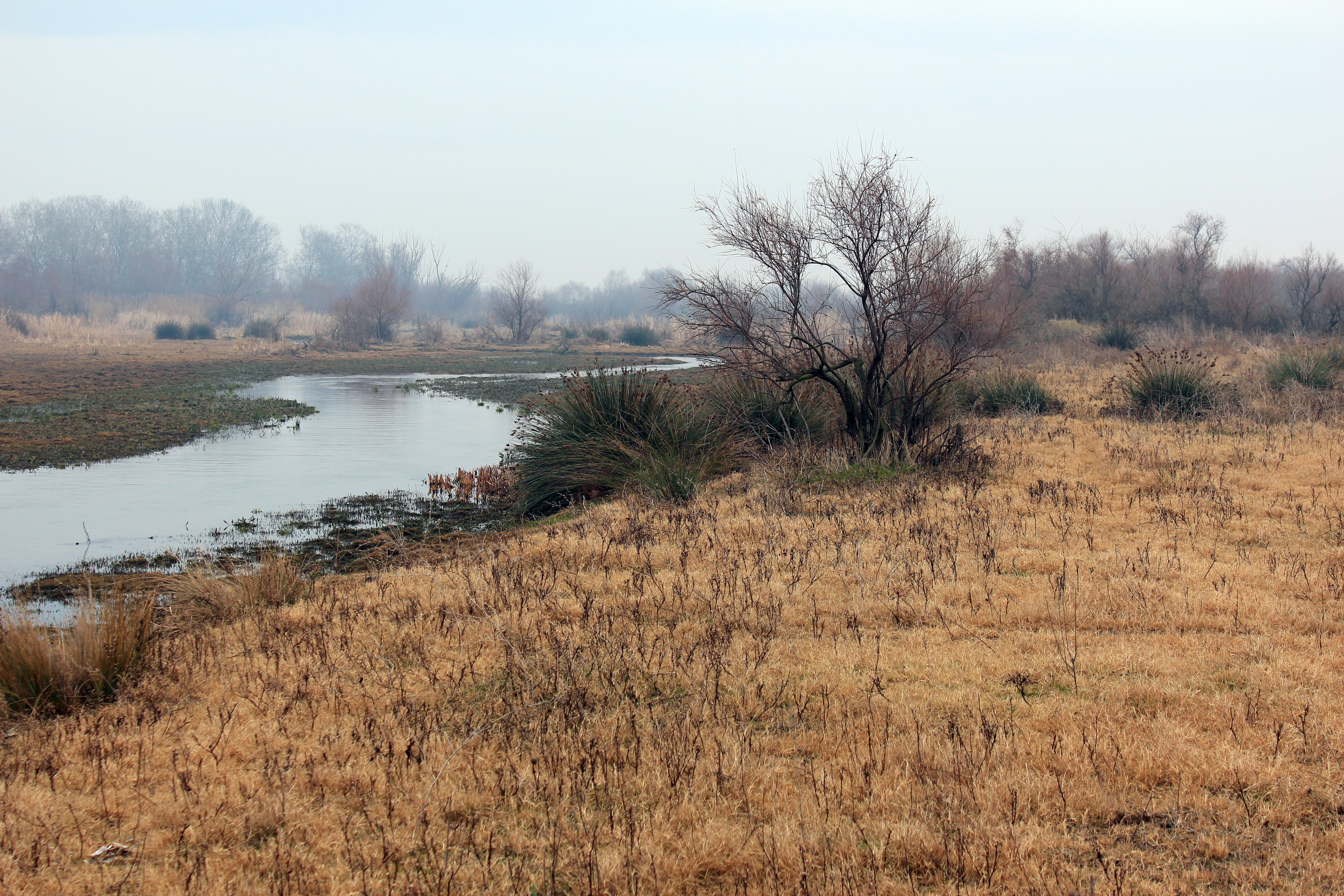
- Native name: Γαλλικός (Greek)

Location
- Country: Greece

Physical characteristics
- Source
  - location: Kilkis regional unit
- Mouth
  - location: Aegean Sea
  - coordinates: 40°37′50″N 22°50′44″E
- Length: 70 km (43 mi)
- Basin size: 1,055 km^{2} (407 sq mi)

The Gallikos (Greek: Γαλλικός) is a river in Central Macedonia, Greece. It was known as the Echedoros (Εχέδωρος) in antiquity and the Gomaropnichtis (Γομαροπνίχτης) in the Middle Ages. The current name probably derives from the ancient Roman colony of Callicum (modern Kilkis) near the river.

It rises in the Krousia Mountain and flows into the Aegean Sea in the Thermaic Gulf, near Sindos. It is 70 km (43 mi) long. Its drainage basin is 1,055 km^{2} (407 sq mi).
