= 430 BC =

430 BC in various calendars
Gregorian calendar	430 BC; CDXXX BC
Ab urbe condita	324
Ancient Egypt era	XXVII dynasty, 96
Pharaoh	Artaxerxes I of Persia, 36
Ancient Greek Olympiad (summer)	87th Olympiad, year 3
Assyrian calendar	4321
Balinese saka calendar	N/A
Bengali calendar	−1023 – −1022
Berber calendar	521
Buddhist calendar	115
Burmese calendar	−1067
Byzantine calendar	5079–5080
Chinese calendar	庚戌年 (Metal Dog); 2268 or 2061 — to — 辛亥年 (Metal Pig); 2269 or 2062
Coptic calendar	−713 – −712
Discordian calendar	737
Ethiopian calendar	−437 – −436
Hebrew calendar	3331–3332
- Hindu calendars
Vikram Samvat	−373 – −372
Shaka Samvat	N/A
Kali Yuga	2671–2672
Holocene calendar	9571
Iranian calendar	1051 BP – 1050 BP
Islamic calendar	1083 BH – 1082 BH
Javanese calendar	N/A
Julian calendar	N/A
Korean calendar	1904
Minguo calendar	2341 before ROC 民前2341年
Nanakshahi calendar	−1897
Thai solar calendar	113–114
Tibetan calendar	ལྕགས་ཕོ་ཁྱི་ལོ་ (male Iron-Dog) −303 or −684 or −1456 — to — ལྕགས་མོ་ཕག་ལོ་ (female Iron-Boar) −302 or −683 or −1455

Year 430 BC was a year of the pre-Julian Roman calendar. At the time, it was known as the Year of the Consulship of Crassus and Iullus (or, less frequently, year 324 Ab urbe condita). The denomination 430 BC for this year has been used since the early medieval period, when the Anno Domini calendar era became the prevalent method in Europe for naming years.

== Events ==
=== By place ===
==== Greece ====
- The army of Sparta loots Attica for a second time, but Pericles is not daunted and refuses to revise his initial strategy. Unwilling to engage the Spartan army in battle, he again leads a naval expedition to plunder the coasts of the Peloponnesus, this time taking 100 Athenian ships with him.
- Potidaea finally capitulates to the siege by Athenian forces in the winter.
- An outbreak of a plague hits Athens and the disease ravages the densely packed city (modern DNA analyses of material from ancient cemeteries suggest the mortal disease may have been typhus). The plague wipes out over 30,000 citizens, sailors, and soldiers as well as Pericles' two sons. Roughly one-quarter of the Athenian population dies. The fear of plague is so widespread that the Spartan invasion of Attica is abandoned, their troops being unwilling to risk contact with the diseased enemy.
- Pericles becomes ill from the plague but he recovers, temporarily. He is deposed from his position as General (or Strategos) but is later reappointed.

=== By topic ===
==== Art ====
- Polyclitus completes one of his greatest statues, the Diadumenos (Diadem-bearer).
- Approximate date – Sophocles' drama Oedipus Rex is first performed in Athens.

==== Religion ====
- Traditional date where scholars believe the Hebrew prophet known as Malachi writes the 39th and last book, and last of the prophetic books, of the Old Testament of the Biblical canon, the Book of Malachi. Biblical books written between now and the millennium will not be included in the Hebrew Bible and in some Christian traditions considered Biblical apocrypha.

== Deaths ==
- Empedocles, Greek philosopher (approximate date) (b. c. 490 BC)
- Phidias, Greek sculptor (approximate date) (b. c. 480 BC)
- Zeno of Elea, Greek philosopher (approximate date) (b. c. 490 BC)
