= Lisaea =

Ancient Greek polis

Lisaea or Lisaia (Ancient Greek: Λίσαια), also Lisae or Lisai (Ancient Greek: Λίσαι), was an ancient Greek polis (city-state) in the Chalcidice, ancient Macedonia. It is cited by Herodotus as one of the cities—together with Lipaxus, Combreia, Gigonus, Campsa, Smila, Aeneia—located in the vicinity of the Thermaic Gulf, in a region called Crusis near the peninsula of Pallene, where Xerxes recruited troops in his expedition of the year 480 BCE against Greece.

Since Lisaea does not appear in any other source, it has been suggested that the toponym must have been a scribal error that should actually refer to a city called Aesa (Αἶσα) that belonged to the Delian League appearing in the tribute registry to Athens for 434/3 BCE. This suggestion was accepted by the editors of the Barrington Atlas of the Greek and Roman World.
