= 367th =

367th may refer to:

- 367th Fighter Group, later the 133d Operations Group, the flying component of the Minnesota Air National Guard's 133d Airlift Wing
- 367th Fighter Squadron Inactivated in 1945, then reactivated at Homestead Air Reserve Base in 2015
- 367th Bombardment Squadron, later the 367th Training Support Squadron, located at Hill Air Force Base, Utah, a component squadron of the 782d Training Group

== See also ==
- 367 (number)
- 367, the year 367 (CCCLXVII) of the Julian calendar
- 367 BC
