= Petasos =

Sun hat worn in Ancient Greece

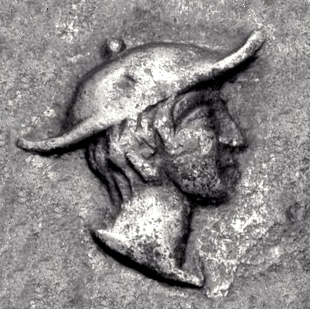
Hermes wearing a petasos. Coinage of Kapsa, Macedon, c. 400 BC

A petasos (Ancient Greek: πέτασος) or petasus (Latin) is a broad brimmed hat of Thessalian origin worn by ancient Greeks, Thracians, Illyrians and Etruscans, often in combination with the chlamys cape. It was made of wool felt, leather, straw or animal skin. Women's versions had a high crown while those for men featured a lower crown. It was worn primarily by farmers, travellers and hunters, and was considered characteristic of rural people. As a winged hat, it became the symbol of Hermes, the Greek mythological messenger god.

Along with the pileus, the petasos was the most common hat worn in Ancient Greece. Its wide brim protected the wearer from the sun and rain while a lengthy strap allowed wearers to secure it under the chin. Its popularity later extended to the Etruscans, the Byzantine Empire and the Roman Empire, in slightly modified forms.

A type of metal helmet worn by Athenian cavalry was made in the shape of a petasos. Some examples have holes around the outer edge of the brim, presumably so a fabric cover could be attached. These are known from reliefs and vase paintings, with at least one archaeological example found in an Athenian tomb.

== Gallery ==
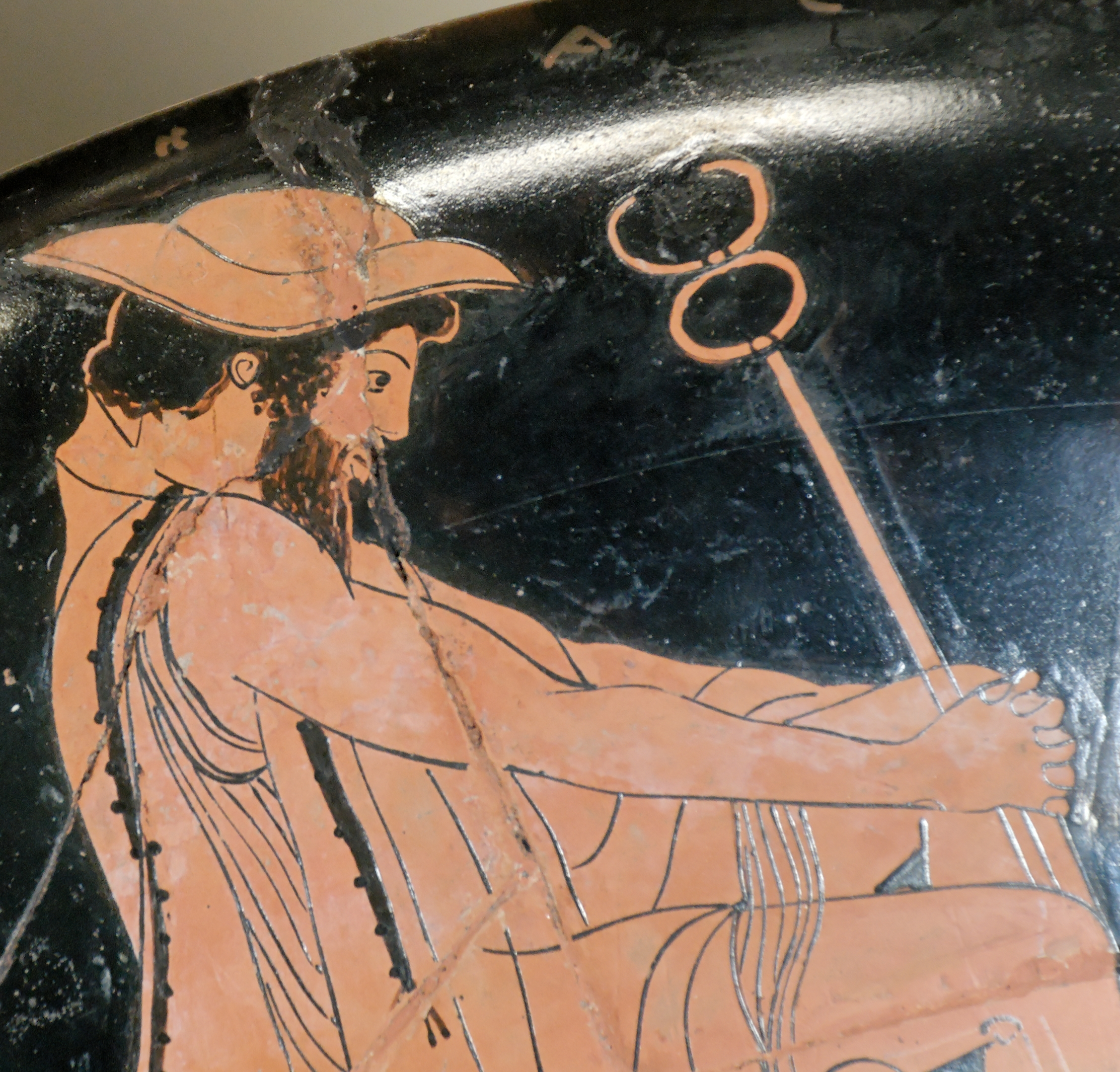
Hermes wearing a petasos and bearing a caduceus

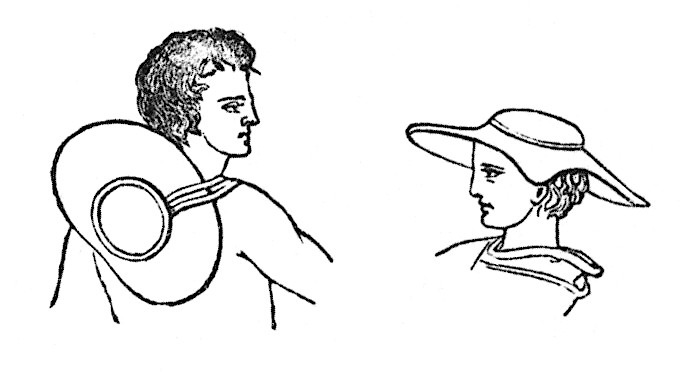
Views of a petasos

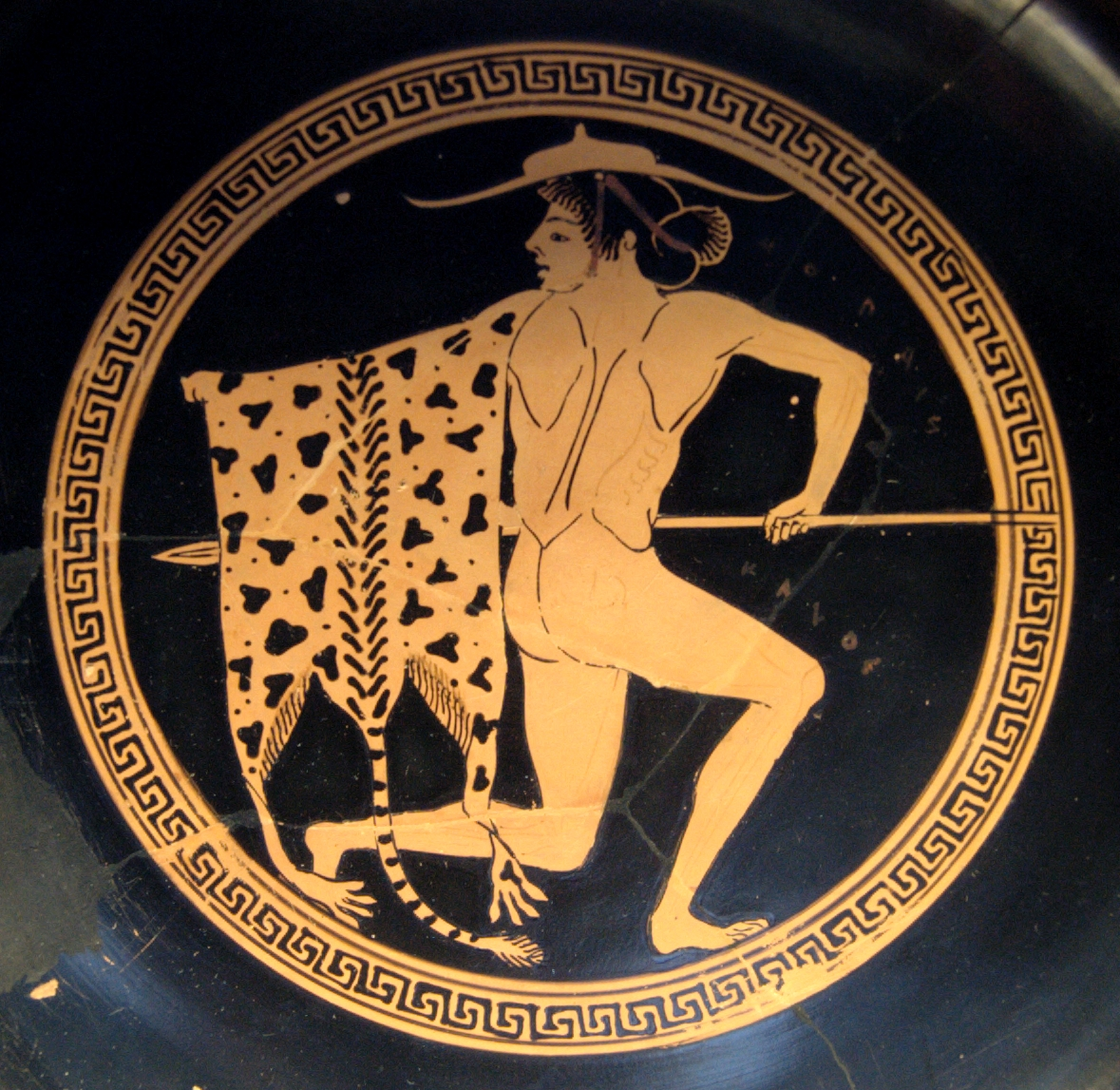
Petasos-wearing youth with spear and leopardskin

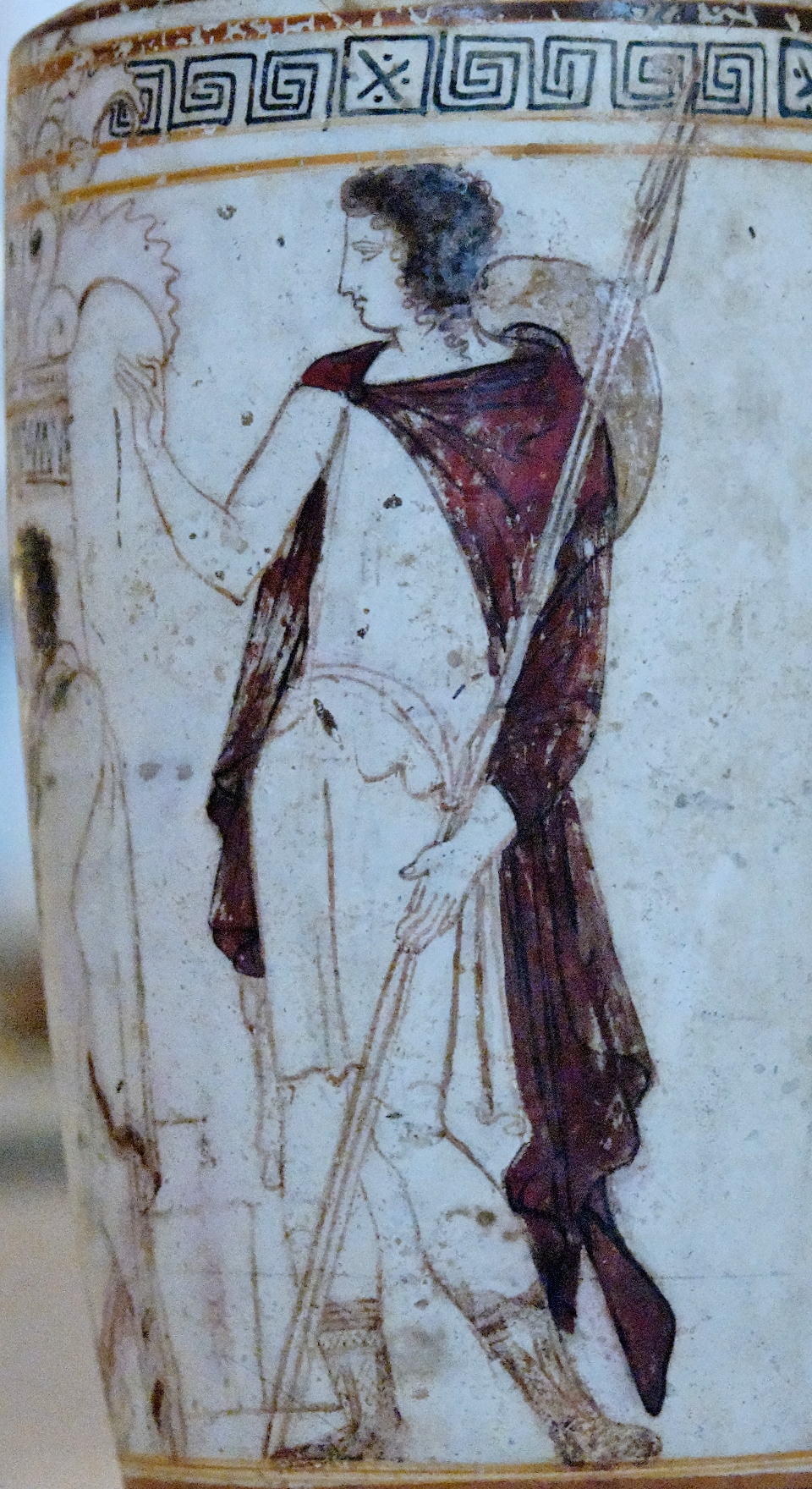
Young warrior with a cloak and petasos dangling over the back

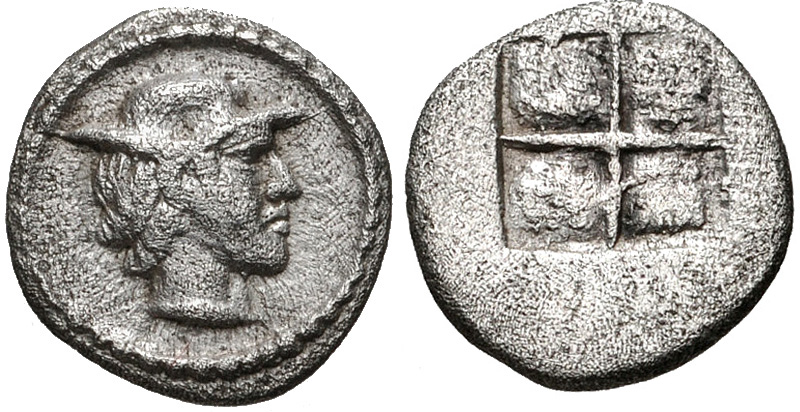
Coin of Alexander I, struck circa 460-450 BC. Young male head right, wearing a petasos.

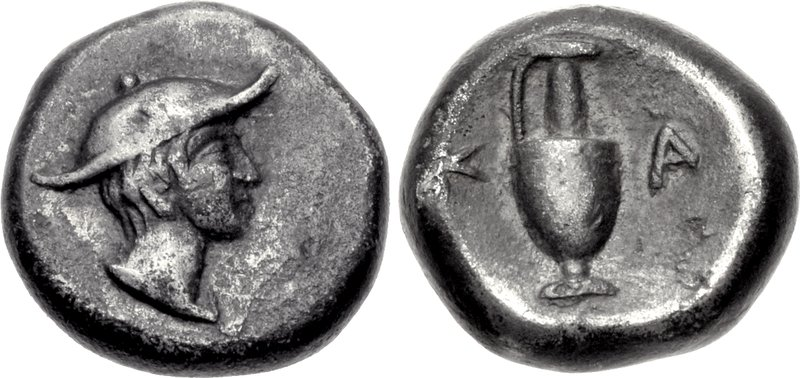
Coinage of Kapsa, Macedon, circa 400 BC.

== See also ==
- Clothing in ancient Greece
- List of hat styles
- Kausia
- Winged helmet
