= 465 BC =

465 BC in various calendars
Gregorian calendar	465 BC; CDLXV BC
Ab urbe condita	289
Ancient Egypt era	XXVII dynasty, 61
Pharaoh	Artaxerxes I of Persia, 1
Ancient Greek Olympiad (summer)	78th Olympiad, year 4
Assyrian calendar	4286
Balinese saka calendar	N/A
Bengali calendar	−1058 – −1057
Berber calendar	486
Buddhist calendar	80
Burmese calendar	−1102
Byzantine calendar	5044–5045
Chinese calendar	乙亥年 (Wood Pig); 2233 or 2026 — to — 丙子年 (Fire Rat); 2234 or 2027
Coptic calendar	−748 – −747
Discordian calendar	702
Ethiopian calendar	−472 – −471
Hebrew calendar	3296–3297
- Hindu calendars
Vikram Samvat	−408 – −407
Shaka Samvat	N/A
Kali Yuga	2636–2637
Holocene calendar	9536
Iranian calendar	1086 BP – 1085 BP
Islamic calendar	1119 BH – 1118 BH
Javanese calendar	N/A
Julian calendar	N/A
Korean calendar	1869
Minguo calendar	2376 before ROC 民前2376年
Nanakshahi calendar	−1932
Thai solar calendar	78–79
Tibetan calendar	阴木猪年 (female Wood-Pig) −338 or −719 or −1491 — to — 阳火鼠年 (male Fire-Rat) −337 or −718 or −1490

Year 465 BC was a year of the pre-Julian Roman calendar. At the time, it was known as the Year of the Consulship of Vibulanus and Barbatus (or, less frequently, year 289 Ab urbe condita). The denomination 465 BC for this year has been used since the early medieval period, when the Anno Domini calendar era became the prevalent method in Europe for naming years.

== Events ==
=== By place ===
==== Persian Empire ====
- King Xerxes I of the Persian Empire, together with his eldest son, is murdered by one of his Ministers, Artabanus the Hyrcanian. The Persian general, Megabyzus, is thought to have been one of the conspirators in the assassination.
- Artabanus gains control of the Achaemenid state for several months. However, he is betrayed by Megabyzus and is killed by Xerxes' son, Artaxerxes.

==== Greece ====
- Thasos revolts from the Delian League. The revolt arises from rivalry over trade with the Thracian hinterland and, in particular, over the ownership of a gold mine. Athens under Kimon lays siege to Thasos after the Athenian fleet defeats the Thasos fleet

=== By topic ===
==== Arts ====
- Tholos, west side of Ancient Agora of Athens, is built (approximate date).
- Phidias begins producing the sculpture called The Athena Promachos (The Defender) and completes it ten years later.

== Deaths ==
- Xerxes I, king of Persia (murdered) (b. c. 519 BC)
- King Goujian of Yue, king of the Chinese State of Yue
