= Archestratus (general) =

5th-century BC Athenian general

Archestratus (Ancient Greek: Ἀρχέστρατος) was a general who in 432 BCE was sent by Athens to Potidaea, in which a revolt was brewing, to take Potidean hostages and demolish the city wall. It is possible this expedition included the general Alcibiades and philosopher Socrates.

When Archestratus got his forces going, after landing in Thrace, he ignored Potidaea and turned toward Therma in Macedon, as the Potidaeans were revolting and allied with Perdiccas II of Macedon. Archestratus had 30 ships and a thousand armed soldiers, but thought his force too small to engage the rebels. Some scholars have suggested that it was the approach of Archistratus's fleet was what pushed Potidaea into open revolt.

It is thought the forces circled back around to take part in the Battle of Potidaea.

Later, Archestratus was one of the ten strategoi (στοατηγοί, or "commanders") who were appointed to supersede Alcibiades in the command of the Athenian fleet after the Battle of Notium in 407.

The writers Xenophon and Diodorus Siculus, who give us Archestratus' name in this list, say no more of him; but we learn from Lysias that he died at Mytilene, and he appears therefore to have been with Conon when Callicratidas chased the Athenian fleet from Ἐκατόννησοι.

This Archestratus is thought to be different from the boule member with this name, who was imprisoned for suggesting Athens capitulate to the Spartans.
