= Smila (Macedonia) =

Ancient city in Chalkidiki, Greece

Smila (Ancient Greek: Σμίλα), also spelt Smilla (Σμίλλα), was an ancient Greek polis (city-state) in the Chalcidice, ancient Macedonia. It is cited by Herodotus as one of the cities - together with Lipaxus, Combreia, Lisaea, Gigonus, Campsa, Aeneia - located in the vicinity of the Thermaic Gulf, in a region called Crusis near the peninsula of Pallene where Xerxes recruited troops in his expedition of the year 480 BCE against Greece. Subsequently the city belonged to the Delian League since it appears on a tribute list to Athens in 434/3 BCE.

Its site is unlocated.
