= 519 BC =

519 BC in various calendars
- Gregorian calendar: 519 BC; DXIX BC
- Ab urbe condita: 235
- Ancient Egypt era: XXVII dynasty, 7
- Pharaoh: Darius I of Persia, 3
- Ancient Greek Olympiad (summer): 65th Olympiad, year 2
- Assyrian calendar: 4232
- Balinese saka calendar: N/A
- Bengali calendar: −1112 – −1111
- Berber calendar: 432
- Buddhist calendar: 26
- Burmese calendar: −1156
- Byzantine calendar: 4990–4991
- Chinese calendar: 辛巳年 (Metal Snake); 2179 or 1972 — to — 壬午年 (Water Horse); 2180 or 1973
- Coptic calendar: −802 – −801
- Discordian calendar: 648
- Ethiopian calendar: −526 – −525
- Hebrew calendar: 3242–3243
- Hindu calendars
- Vikram Samvat: −462 – −461
- Shaka Samvat: N/A
- Kali Yuga: 2582–2583
- Holocene calendar: 9482
- Iranian calendar: 1140 BP – 1139 BP
- Islamic calendar: 1175 BH – 1174 BH
- Javanese calendar: N/A
- Julian calendar: N/A
- Korean calendar: 1815
- Minguo calendar: 2430 before ROC 民前2430年
- Nanakshahi calendar: −1986
- Thai solar calendar: 24–25
- Tibetan calendar: ལྕགས་མོ་སྦྲུལ་ལོ་ (female Iron-Snake) −392 or −773 or −1545 — to — ཆུ་ཕོ་རྟ་ལོ་ (male Water-Horse) −391 or −772 or −1544

The year 519 BC was a year of the pre-Julian Roman calendar. In the Roman Empire, it was known as year 235 Ab urbe condita. The denomination 519 BC for this year has been used since the early medieval period, when the Anno Domini calendar era became the prevalent method in Europe for naming years.

== Events ==
=== By place ===
==== Greece ====
- Herodotus tells that Cleomenes happened to be in the vicinity of Plataia, when the Plataians requested an alliance with Sparta, which he rejected, but instead he advised them to ally with Athens, because he wanted to stir a border conflict between Thebes and Athens, two of the most powerful poleis of central Greece.

==== China ====
- Zhou Jing Wang/Ji Gail becomes King of the Zhou Dynasty of China.

== Births ==
- Cincinnatus, Roman aristocrat and statesman (d. 430 BC)
- Xerxes I of Persia, fourth king of Persia (or 518 BC) (d. 465 BC)
