= Aneristus =

Aneristus (Ancient Greek: Ἀνήριστος), the son of Sperthias, a Lacedaemonian ambassador, and grandson of Aneristus, was a figure in the Peloponnesian War. He was sent at the beginning of the war, around 430 BCE, to solicit the aid of the king of Persia. He was surrendered by the Athenians, together with the other ambassadors who accompanied him, by Sadocus, son of Sitalces, king of Thrace, taken to Athens, and there put to death.
