= Aesa =

Coordinates: 40°18′33″N 23°03′37″E

Aesa or Aisa (Ancient Greek: Αἶσα) was a town of ancient Macedonia. Aesa belonged to the Delian League since it appears on a tribute list to Athens in 434/3 BCE. The editors of the Barrington Atlas of the Greek and Roman World identify Aesa with Lisaea, a city mentioned by Herodotus but otherwise unknown in other sources.

The site of Aesa is tentatively located near modern Nea Kallikrateia.
