= 490 BC =

490 BC in various calendars
- Gregorian calendar: 490 BC; CDXC BC
- Ab urbe condita: 264
- Ancient Egypt era: XXVII dynasty, 36
- Pharaoh: Darius I of Persia, 32
- Ancient Greek Olympiad (summer): 72nd Olympiad, year 3
- Assyrian calendar: 4261
- Balinese saka calendar: N/A
- Bengali calendar: −1083 – −1082
- Berber calendar: 461
- Buddhist calendar: 55
- Burmese calendar: −1127
- Byzantine calendar: 5019–5020
- Chinese calendar: 庚戌年 (Metal Dog); 2208 or 2001 — to — 辛亥年 (Metal Pig); 2209 or 2002
- Coptic calendar: −773 – −772
- Discordian calendar: 677
- Ethiopian calendar: −497 – −496
- Hebrew calendar: 3271–3272
- Hindu calendars
- Vikram Samvat: −433 – −432
- Shaka Samvat: N/A
- Kali Yuga: 2611–2612
- Holocene calendar: 9511
- Iranian calendar: 1111 BP – 1110 BP
- Islamic calendar: 1145 BH – 1144 BH
- Javanese calendar: N/A
- Julian calendar: N/A
- Korean calendar: 1844
- Minguo calendar: 2401 before ROC 民前2401年
- Nanakshahi calendar: −1957
- Thai solar calendar: 53–54
- Tibetan calendar: ལྕགས་ཕོ་ཁྱི་ལོ་ (male Iron-Dog) −363 or −744 or −1516 — to — ལྕགས་མོ་ཕག་ལོ་ (female Iron-Boar) −362 or −743 or −1515

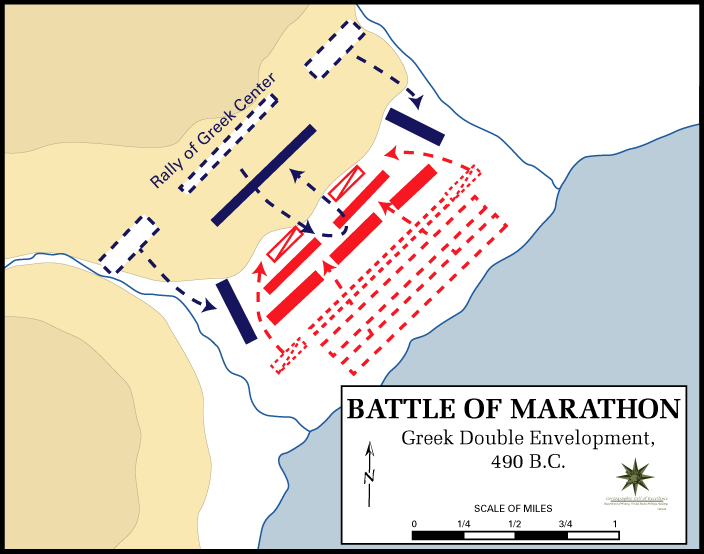
The Battle of Marathon

Year 490 BC was a year of the pre-Julian Roman calendar. At the time, it was known as the Year of the Consulship of Camerinus and Flavus (or, less frequently, year 264 Ab urbe condita). The denomination 490 BC for this year has been used since the early medieval period, when the Anno Domini calendar era became the prevalent method in Europe for naming years.

== Events ==
=== By place ===
==== Greece ====
- Darius I sends an expedition, under Artaphernes and Datis the Mede, across the Aegean to attack the Athenians and the Eretrians. Hippias, the aged ex-tyrant of Athens, is on one of the Persian ships in the hope of being restored to power in Athens.
- When the Ionian Greeks in Asia Minor rebelled against Persia in 499 BC, Eretria joined Athens in sending aid to the rebels. As a result, Darius makes a point of punishing Eretria during his invasion of Greece. The city is sacked and burned and its inhabitants are enslaved. He intends the same fate for Athens.
- September 12 – The Battle of Marathon takes place as a Persian army of more than 20,000 men is advised by Hippias to land in the Bay of Marathon, where they meet the Athenians supported by the Plataeans. The Persians are repulsed by 11,500 Greeks under the leadership of Callimachus and Miltiades. Some 6,400 Persians are killed at a cost of 192 Athenian dead. Callimachus, the war-archon of Athens, is killed in the battle. After the battle, the Persians return home.
- Before the Battle of Marathon, the Athenians send a runner, Pheidippides, to seek help from Sparta. However, the Spartans delay sending troops to Marathon because religious requirements (the Carneia) mean they must wait for the full moon.
- The Greek historian Herodotus, the main source for the Greco-Persian Wars, mentions Pheidippides as the messenger who runs from Athens to Sparta asking for help, and then runs back, a distance of over 240 kilometres each way. After the battle, he runs back to Athens to spread the news and raise the spirits. It is claimed that his last words before collapsing and dying in Athens are "Chairete, nikomen" ("Rejoice, we are victorious").
- Hippias dies at Lemnos on the journey back to Sardis after the Persian defeat.
- Cleomenes I is forced to flee Sparta when his plot against Demaratus is discovered, but the Spartans allow him to return when he begins gathering an army in the surrounding territories. However, by this time he has become insane, and the Spartans put him in prison. Shortly after, he commits suicide. He is succeeded as King of Sparta by a member of the Agiad house, his half-brother, Leonidas.

==== Europe ====
- Carthaginian navigator Himilco is the first known explorer from the Mediterranean Sea to reach the northwestern shores of Europe (approximate date).

=== By topic ===
==== Architecture ====
- The Athenians begin the building of a temple to Athena Parthenos (approximate date).
- Stelae are once again allowed in Athenian cemeteries, having been banned since 510 BC.

== Births ==
- Empedocles, Greek philosopher (d. c. 430 BC)
- Zeno of Elea, Greek philosopher (d. c. 430 BC)

== Deaths ==
- Hippias, tyrant of Athens
- Callimachus, war-archon of Athens
- Appius Claudius Sabinus Regillensis, legendary founder of the gens Claudia
- Pheidippides, messenger and soldier of Athens
