= 367 BC =

367 BC in various calendars
| Gregorian calendar | 367 BC; CCCLXVII BC |
| Ab urbe condita | 387 |
| Ancient Egypt era | XXX dynasty, 14 |
| Pharaoh | Nectanebo I, 14 |
| Ancient Greek Olympiad (summer) | 103rd Olympiad, year 2 |
| Assyrian calendar | 4384 |
| Balinese saka calendar | N/A |
| Bengali calendar | −960 – −959 |
| Berber calendar | 584 |
| Buddhist calendar | 178 |
| Burmese calendar | −1004 |
| Byzantine calendar | 5142–5143 |
| Chinese calendar | 癸丑年 (Water Ox); 2331 or 2124 — to — 甲寅年 (Wood Tiger); 2332 or 2125 |
| Coptic calendar | −650 – −649 |
| Discordian calendar | 800 |
| Ethiopian calendar | −374 – −373 |
| Hebrew calendar | 3394–3395 |
- Hindu calendars
| Vikram Samvat | −310 – −309 |
| Shaka Samvat | N/A |
| Kali Yuga | 2734–2735 |
| Holocene calendar | 9634 |
| Iranian calendar | 988 BP – 987 BP |
| Islamic calendar | 1018 BH – 1017 BH |
| Javanese calendar | N/A |
| Julian calendar | N/A |
| Korean calendar | 1967 |
| Minguo calendar | 2278 before ROC 民前2278年 |
| Nanakshahi calendar | −1834 |
| Thai solar calendar | 176–177 |
| Tibetan calendar | 阴水牛年 (female Water-Ox) −240 or −621 or −1393 — to — 阳木虎年 (male Wood-Tiger) −239 or −620 or −1392 |

Year 367 BC was a year of the pre-Julian Roman calendar. At the time, it was known as the Year of the Tribunate of Cossus, Maluginensis, Macerinus, Capitolinus, Cicurinus and Poplicola (or, less frequently, year 387 Ab urbe condita). The denomination 367 BC for this year has been used since the early medieval period, when the Anno Domini calendar era became the prevalent method in Europe for naming years.

== Events ==
=== By place ===
==== Greece ====
- The Theban general, Epaminondas, again invades the Peloponnesus, but this time achieves little beyond winning Sicyon over to an alliance with Thebes. When he returns to Thebes, he is again put on trial, and again acquitted.
- Archidamus III, son of Agesilaus II of Sparta, commands a Spartan army which scores a victory over the Arcadians.
- Theban leader Pelopidas goes on an embassy to the Persian king Artaxerxes II and induces him to propose a settlement of the Greek states' disputes according to the wishes of the Thebans. Artaxerxes II issues an edict consisting of peace terms for the Greeks, but his edict is not obeyed by any of the Greek states.
- Aristotle arrives in Athens and teaches at Plato's Academy.

==== Sicily ====
- Dionysius I of Syracuse dies and is succeeded as tyrant of the city by his son Dionysius II. As the younger Dionysius is weak and inexperienced, Dion, brother-in-law of the elder Dionysius, assumes control and persuades Plato, whose friendship he has acquired, to train the new tyrant in the practical application of his philosophical principles.
- Dionysius II makes peace with Carthage on the same terms established after his father's defeat by Carthage in the previous decade.

==== Roman Republic ====
- During the ten-year period that Gaius Licinius (Calvus) Stolo is tribune in Rome (376 BC to 367 BC) he does much to reduce the enmity between patricians and plebs by reforming a number of laws. During his term, he proposes the Lex Licinia Sextia, which restores the consulship to the plebs, requires a plebeian consul seat, limits the amount of public land that one person can hold, and regulates debts. The patricians oppose these laws, though they are now finally passed and take effect from 366 BC.
- The temple to Concordia on the Forum Romanum in Rome is built by Marcus Furius Camillus.

=== By topic ===
==== Philosophy ====
- The Greek philosopher and scientist, Aristotle, goes to Athens as a pupil at Plato's Academy.

== Births ==
- Ptolemy, Macedonian general, later founder of the Ptolemaic dynasty of Egypt (d. 282 BC)

== Deaths ==
- Dionysius I, tyrant of Syracuse (b. 430 BC)
