= Battle of Potidaea =

Battle between Athens and Corinth (432 BC)

- Part of the Peloponnesian War
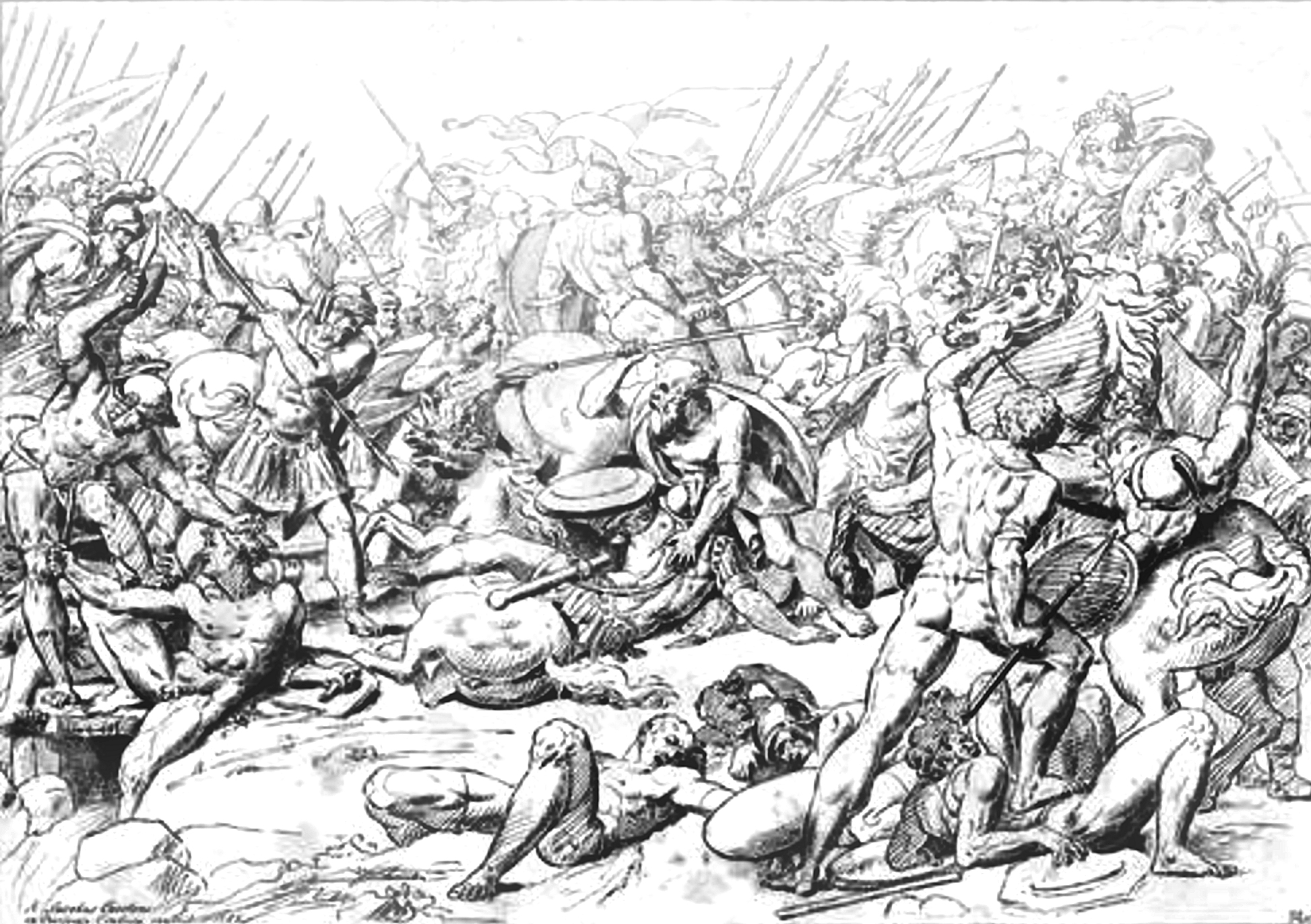
- Battle of Potidaea: Athenians against Corinthians. Scene of Socrates saving Alcibiades. 18th century engraving.
Date	432 BC
Location	Potidaea 40.1937°N 23.3278°E
Result	Athenian victory

Belligerents
Athens	Corinth; Potidaea

Commanders and leaders
Archestratos; Callias †	Aristeus

Strength
70 ships 3,000 hoplites 400 cavalry	1,600 hoplites 400 light troops 200 cavalry

Casualties and losses
150 men	300 men
- Location of the Battle of Potidaea

The Battle of Potidaea was fought in 432 BC between Athens and a combined army from Corinth and Potidaea, along with their various allies. Along with the Battle of Sybota, it was one of the catalysts for the Peloponnesian War.

== Background ==
Potidaea was a colony of Corinth on the Chalcidice peninsula, but was also a member of the Delian League and paid tribute to Athens. It was originally settled by Corinthians and still hosted Corinthian magistrates every year. After the Athenian defeat at Sybota, Athens demanded that Potidaea pull down part of its walls, stop accepting Corinthian magistrates and send hostages to Athens. Athens was afraid that Potidaea would revolt due to Corinthian or Macedonian influence, as Perdiccas II of Macedon was encouraging revolts among Athens' other allies in Thrace. Whether Potidaea was indeed launching an uprising, the Athenian demands precipitated the revolt. To ensure that its demands were carried out, Athens sent an expedition led by Archestratus within the context of Corinthian and Macedonian hostility.

== Battle ==
Athens gathered a fleet of 30 ships and 1,000 hoplites under the overall command of Archestratus. The Athenian force was originally meant to fight Perdiccas in Macedonia, but was diverted to Potidaea. The Potidaeans sent ambassadors to Athens and Sparta, and when negotiations broke down in Athens, Sparta promised to help Potidaea revolt through a pledge to invade Attica. The Athenian fleet sailed for Potidaea, but when it arrived, Archestratus attacked the Macedonians instead, as the Potidaeans had already revolted and allied with Perdiccas. Corinth sent 1,600 hoplites and 400 light troops to Potidaea as well, under the command of Aristeus, but as "volunteers," thus hoping not to provoke a larger war. In response, Athens sent out another 2,000 hoplites and 40 more ships, under the command of Callias, son of Calliades. After some fighting against Perdiccas, the combined Athenian forces sailed to Potidaea and landed there. Perdiccas and 200 of his cavalry joined with Aristeus, and their combined army marched to Potidaea.

In the ensuing battle, Aristeus' wing of Corinthian troops defeated a section of the Athenian line, but elsewhere the Athenians were victorious. Aristeus returned to Potidaea along the sea coast with some difficulty, hoping to avoid the main Athenian army. A reserve force of Potidaeans, located in nearby Olynthus, attempted to relieve Aristeus, but they were also defeated. The Corinthians and Potidaeans lost about 300 men, and the Athenians about 150, including Callias; the Macedonian cavalry did not join the battle.

The Athenians remained outside Potidaea for some time, and were reinforced by another 1,600 hoplites under the command of Phormio. Both sides built walls and counter-walls, and the Athenians succeeded in cutting off Potidaea from the sea with a naval blockade. During the blockade, representatives from Corinth, Athens and Sparta met in Sparta, resulting in a formal declaration of war.

However, this siege, which lasted until 430/429 BC, seriously depleted the Athenian treasury, with as much as 420 talents per year required for the military activity. This was not popular with the Athenians, and in combination with the plague that swept through Athens in the early 420s BC, made the continued leadership of Pericles untenable. The Periclean strategy of hiding behind the Long Walls and relying on the low cash reserves of the Peloponnesians was starting to become unfavourable to the greater Athenian consciousness.

In several of Plato's dialogues (Charmides 153a–d, Apology 28d), the philosopher Socrates is said to be a veteran of the Battle of Potidaea, at which he saved the life of Alcibiades (Symposium 219e–221b).

== Sources ==
- Thucydides, History of the Peloponnesian War 1.56-1.61.
