= Therma =

Ancient city incorporated into Thessaloniki

- Θέρμα (Ancient Greek)
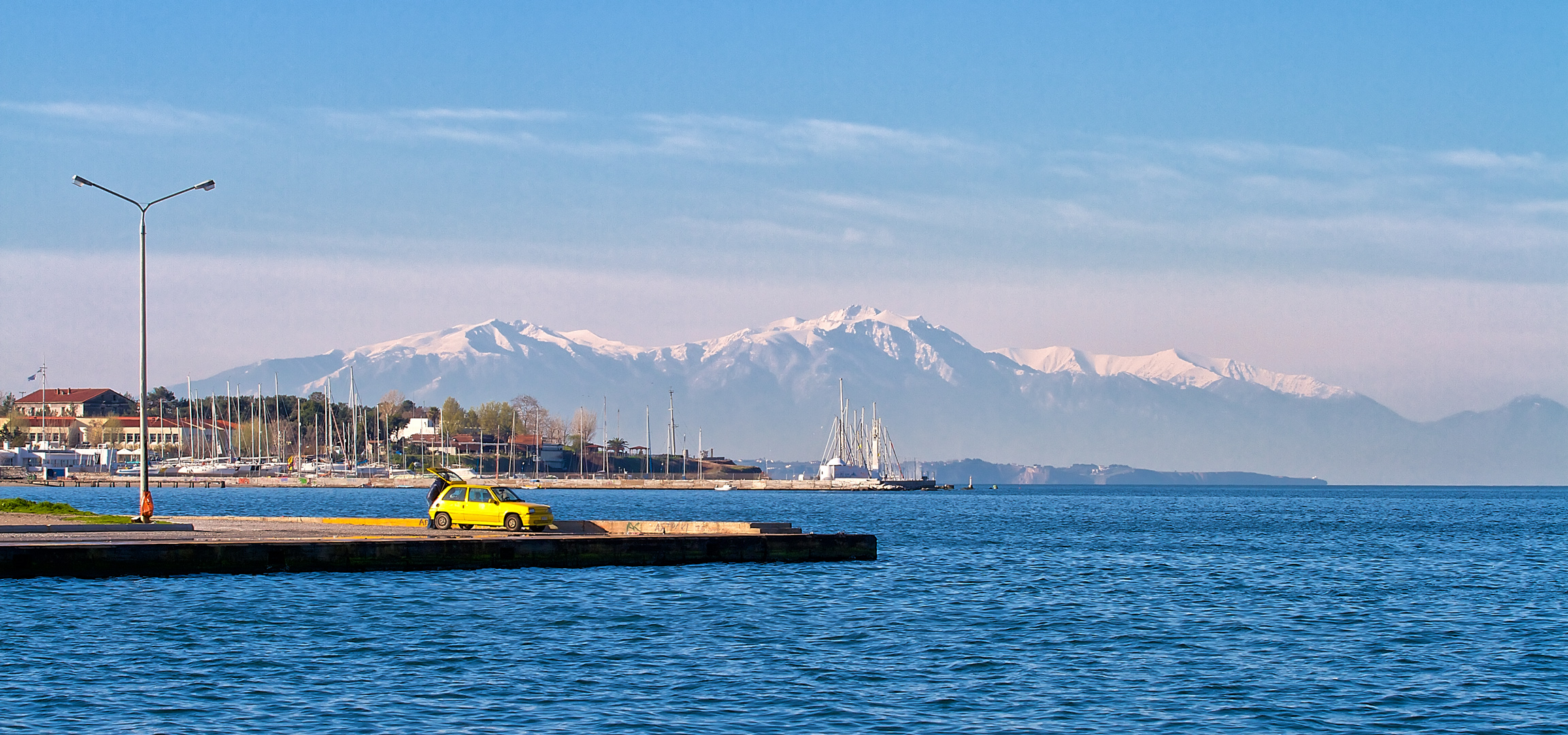
- Herodotus says that Xerxes, Persian invader of Greece in 480 BC, could see Mounts Olympus and Ossa from Therma. They were two mountains in Thessaly across the Thermaic Gulf. This view from Thessaloniki, looking southward along the shore at Mikro Emvolo, seems to fit. It is intermediate in distance between the two habitation sites believed to be possibly ancient Therma. The coordinates given here belong to this coastal point.
- Interactive map of Therma
- 40°35′47″N 22°56′56″E

Therma or Thermē (Ancient Greek: Θέρμα, Θέρμη) is the unknown city incorporated into the new city of Thessaloniki by the Macedonians on its synoecism and foundation. Little is known of literary Therma, including its exact location.

Thessaloniki is the second-largest city in Greece. It surrounds the entire north of the Thermaic Gulf, named after its predecessor. Exactly where Therma was remains a mystery. There is not much room for archaeological excavation between all the modern skyscrapers, and the parklands are valued as such. However, two large habitation mounds remain available and have been extensively excavated. No literary or inscriptional fragment ties them to Therma. The pottery is Greek, but such is the case for any settlement of the times around the Aegean, regardless of known language or ethnic connections. Nearly all of Lower Macedonia was Macedonianized in classical times by the aggressive Argead dynasty, in which the original Thessaloniki, half-sister of Alexander the Great, became queen.

== See also ==
- List of ancient Greek cities

== Bibliography ==
- Herodotus, the Seventh, Eighth, & Ninth Books, with Introduction Reginald Walter Macan
- The Letters to the Thessalonians by Gene L. Green
- From Mycenae to Constantinople: The Evolution of the Ancient City By Richard Allan Tomlinson
- Hidryma Meletōn Chersonēsou tou Haimou (Thessalonikē, Greece)
