= Thermaic Gulf =

Gulf in the northwest Aegean sea

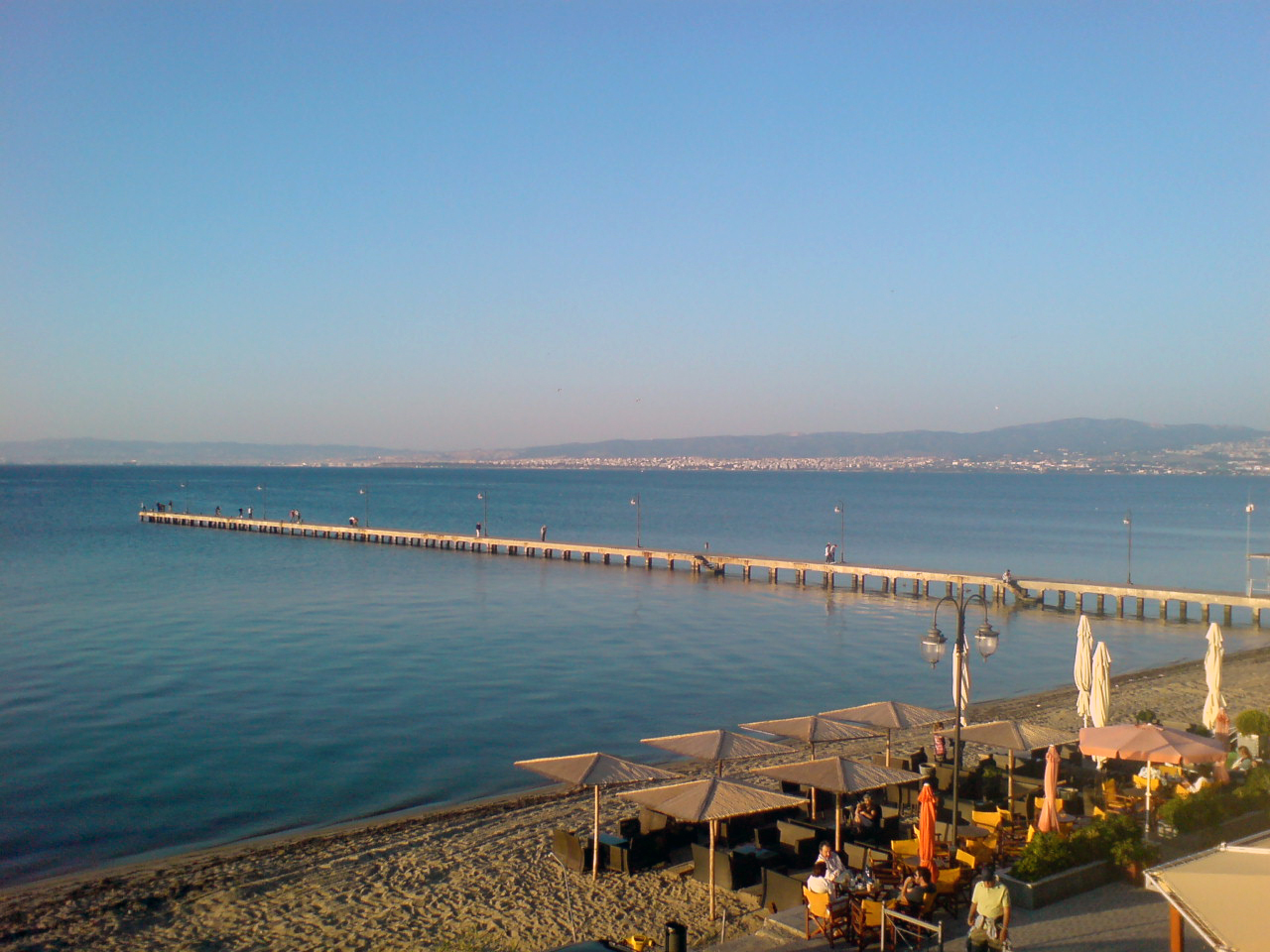
- View of Thermaic Gulf from Peraia, Thessaloniki

- Location of the Thermaic Gulf within Greece
- Location: Central Macedonia
- Coordinates: 40°15′N 22°50′E
- Type: Gulf
- Etymology: Gulf of Therma
- Part of: Aegean Sea
- River sources: Gallikos, Haliacmon, Loudias, Vardar (Axios)
- Basin countries: Greece, North Macedonia

The Thermaic Gulf (Greek: Θερμαϊκός Κόλπος, Thermaïkós Kólpos), also called the Gulf of Thessaloniki and the Macedonian Gulf, is a gulf in Greece, constituting the northwest corner of the Aegean Sea. The city of Thessaloniki is at its northeastern tip, and it is bounded by Pieria, Imathia and Larissa on the west and the Chalkidiki peninsula on the east, with Cape Kassandra at the southeasternmost corner. It is named after the ancient town of Therma, modern Thessaloniki. It is about 100 km (62 mi) long.

By narrower definitions, the Thermaic Gulf is bounded on the west by the line from the mouth of the Axios or Vardar to Cape Megalo Embolo, making it about 15 km (9.3 mi) long; while the smaller Gulf of Salonica is bounded by a line running from the mouth of the Gallikos to Mikro Emvolo.

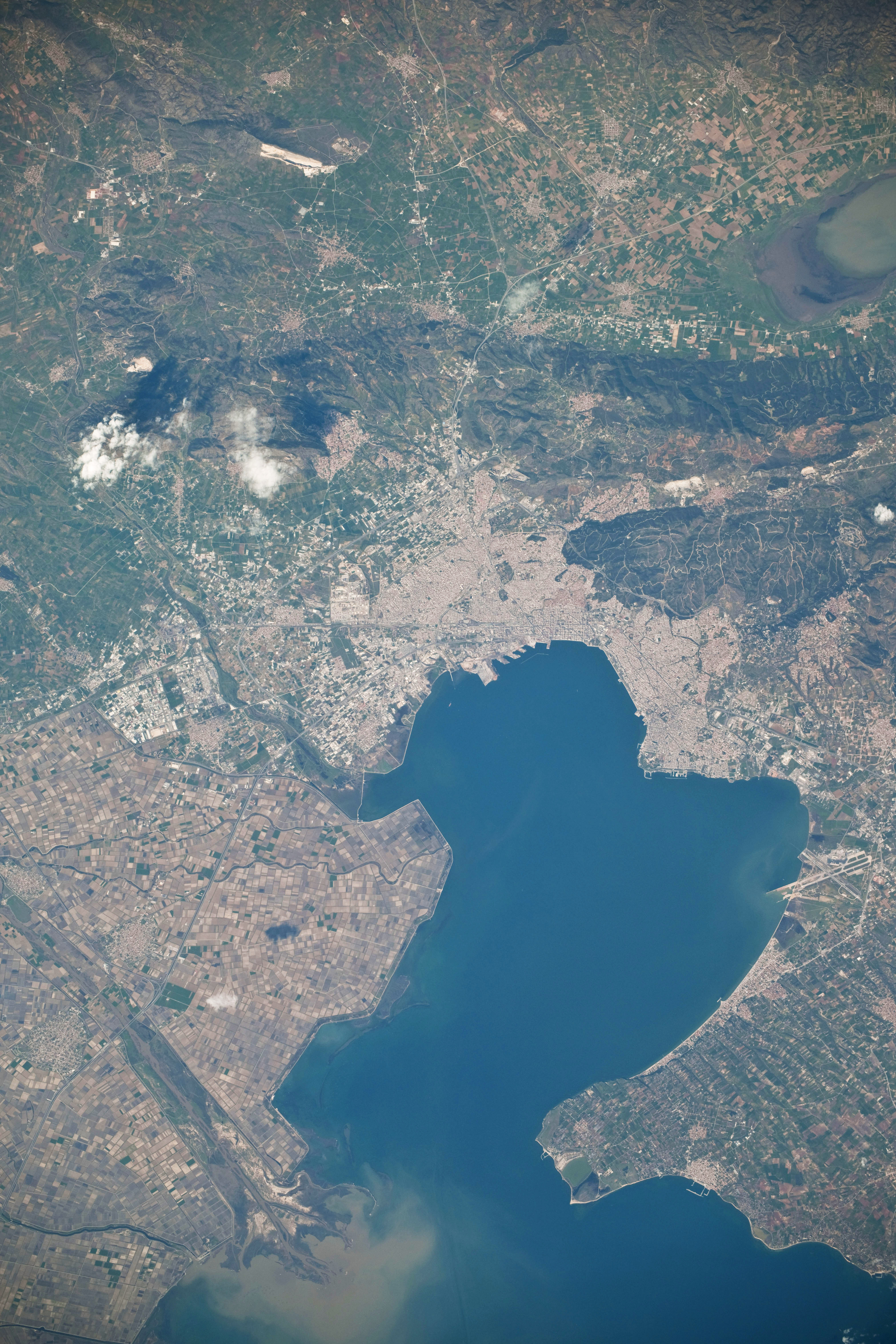
Satellite picture

To the Romans, the gulf was also known as Thermaicus or Thermaeus sinus ("Gulf of Therma") and as Macedonicus sinus ("The Gulf of Macedon", or "The Macedonian Gulf"). One of its modern names is the "Gulf of Thessaloniki", named after the city of Thessaloniki which sprawls around and along the northeastern coast of the gulf.

Places that lie on the gulf include Sani, Kassandreia, ancient Potidaea, Nea Moudania, Agia Triada, Neoi Epivates, Peraia, Kalochori, Methoni, Pydna, Paralia Katerinis, Olympiaki Akti, Alexandrini, Koutsoupia and Stomio (Larissa). The rivers emptying into the gulf are the Pineios, Aliakmon, Loudias, Gallikos and Axios/Vardar; several streams including one near Pydna also empty into the gulf. The Thermaic Gulf was significantly larger in classical times, with many ancient seaside cities (e.g. Pella) are now found several kilometers inland. The extensive silting mainly affects the northern and western parts of the gulf, which receive the bulk of alluvial outflow. The gulf is home to many famous, pristine beaches, which include Sani Beach. However, there are no beaches on the northwest coast, where wetlands stretch from Methone (northwest coast) to Thessaloniki's western suburb of Kalochori.

The Port of Thessaloniki is the gulf's largest and busiest port, while another twelve small ports provide sea transport in, out and around the Thermaic gulf. Major road networks of northern Greece such as the A1/E75 motorway (Athens - Thessaloniki) encircles the western portion of the gulf, while the A24 (Thessaloniki - Nea Moudania motorway) almost encircles the eastern part of it.
