= Potidaea =

Colony founded by the Corinthians around 600 BC

Coordinates: 40°11′37″N 23°19′40″E

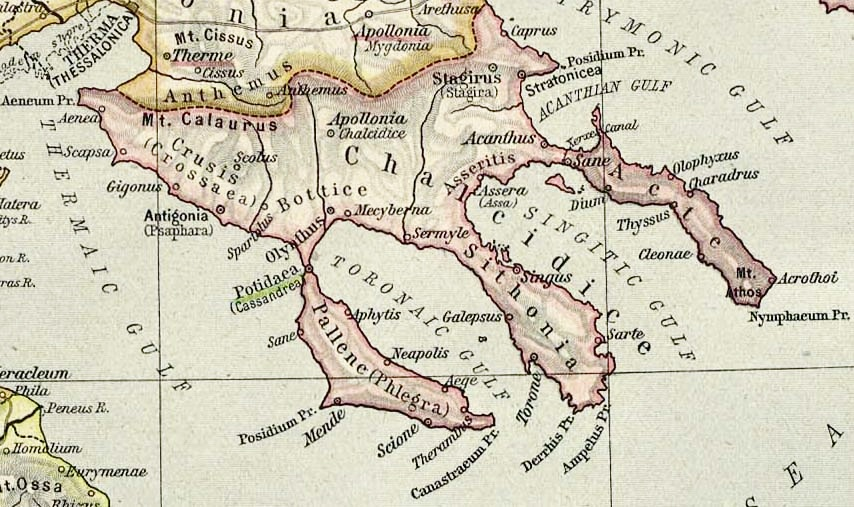
Map of ancient Chalcidice, showing peninsula of Pallene and Potidaea

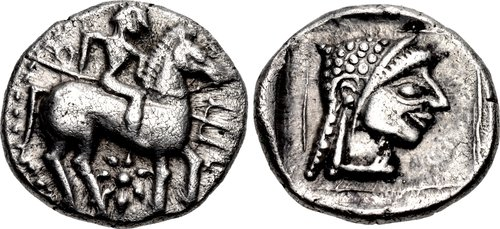
Coinage of Potidaia, circa 525-500 BC. Obv: Horseman holding trident; star below. Rev: Head of female right, with Archaic features, in linear square within incuse square.

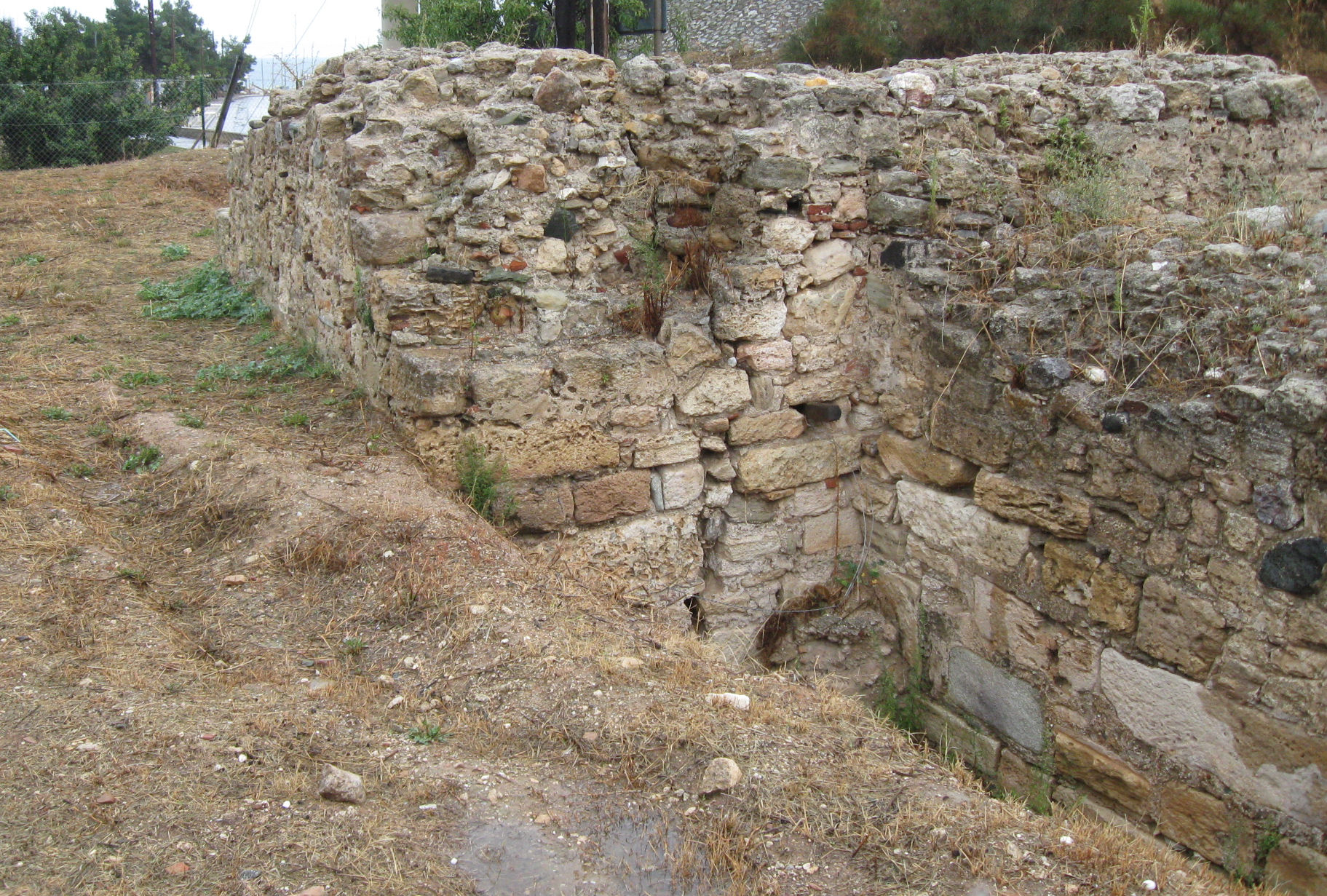
Remains of the city wall of Potidaea.

Potidaea (/ˌpɒtɪˈdiːə/; Ancient Greek: Ποτίδαια, Potidaia, also Ποτείδαια, Poteidaia) was a colony founded by the Corinthians around 600 BC in the narrowest point of the peninsula of Pallene, the westernmost of three peninsulas at the southern end of Chalcidice in northern Greece.

One of the leading cities of Chalcidice, Potidaea was a tributary member of the Delian League whose revolt in 432 BC helped precipitate the Peloponnesian War. It fell to Athens after a siege of more than two years, was twice settled with Athenian cleruchs, and was taken by Philip II of Macedon in 356 BC, who sold its people into slavery and gave the town and its territory to Olynthus. In 316 BC Cassander refounded the site as Cassandreia.

== Name ==
The toponym appears as Ποτείδαια in Herodotus, Thucydides and the Athenian tribute lists, and in the later form Ποτίδαια in Isocrates, Pseudo-Scylax and Diodorus Siculus. The city-ethnic is variously Ποτειδαιήτης (Poteidaiētēs), Ποτειδεάτης (Poteideatēs), Ποτειδαιάτης (Poteidaiatēs) and Ποτειδαεύς (Poteidaeus). The name is connected with Poseidon, who had a temple in the proasteion, the suburb outside the walls, in 479 BC.

== Site and territory ==
Potidaea stood on the isthmus of Pallene, which Strabo gives as 900 meters wide at its narrowest. Herodotus places the city on Pallene next to Aphytis, and Thucydides and Xenophon on the isthmus itself. Its territory cannot have exceeded about 65 square kilometers, since Olynthus lay some 11 kilometers to the north and Aphytis and Sane about 14 and 15 kilometers to the south. Two passages of Thucydides indicate that the city had two harbors, one to the east and one to the west.

A canal cuts the isthmus today. Strabo describes the isthmus of Pallene as διορωρυγμένος, cut through, so a canal existed at some point in antiquity; Herodotus mentions the canal at Athos but not one here, which may indicate that it was dug later. The excavators of the Hellenistic southern wall note that when the Romans abandoned their siege of Cassandreia in 169 BC they sailed around the promontory, which they take to show that no canal had yet been cut at that date.

== History ==
=== Foundation ===
Potidaea was colonized from Corinth, and according to Nicolaus of Damascus its founder was Euagoras, son of Periander, which places the foundation at about 600 BC. Corinth continued to send annual magistrates called epidemiourgoi to the city as late as the second half of the 5th century, although there is no evidence that Potidaea was governed from Corinth. The city sent donations to Delphi in the late 6th century and maintained a treasury in the sanctuary there.

=== Persian Wars ===
Potidaea supplied troops and ships to Xerxes in 480 BC, but afterward joined the Greek side and sent 300 hoplites to Plataea, where the city is named on the Serpent Column. In 479 BC it revolted from Persia, entered into an alliance with the other towns of Pallene, and withstood a Persian siege for three months.

While besieged by the Persians in 479 BC, the town may have been saved by a tsunami. Herodotus reports how the Persian attackers who tried to exploit an unusual retreat of the water were suddenly surprised by "a great flood-tide, higher, as the people of the place say, than any one of the many that had been before". Several tsunamigenic layers have been identified along the Thracian Coast, indicating that the region is prone to tsunamis. While tsunami are generally associated with earthquakes, Herodotus, the source of this story, makes no mention of an earthquake at the time. This makes it more likely that the event was a meteotsunami. Not only are such events relatively common in the Mediterranean, but their effect is amplified in a long, narrow body of water, which is a good description for the situation of Potidaea, which lies at the head of Toroneos gulf.

=== Delian League and the revolt of 432 BC ===
During the time of the Delian League, conflicts occurred between Athens and Corinth. However, the Corinthians still sent a supreme magistrate each year. Potidaea was inevitably involved in all of the conflicts between Athens and Corinth. The people revolted against the Athenians in 432 BC, and it was besieged at the beginning of the Peloponnesian War and taken in the Battle of Potidaea in 430 BC.

Potidaea was probably a member of the league from its foundation, but does not appear in the tribute lists until 446/5 BC; it has been suggested that it first contributed ships and only later tribute. It is recorded eleven times thereafter, in the Thracian district, paying six talents down to 440/39 BC but fifteen in 433/2 BC. In 432 BC the Athenians required the city to demolish part of its wall towards Pallene, give hostages, and refuse the Corinthian epidemiourgoi. Potidaea sent envoys to Athens and Sparta at the same time, then allied itself with the Bottiaeans and the Chalcidians and revolted. The Athenian siege lasted from 432 until the city capitulated in 430 BC, when the inhabitants were permitted to leave and dispersed through Chalcidice and elsewhere.

=== Athenian cleruchy and the fourth century ===
Athens settled a thousand cleruchs at Potidaea after its surrender. There was civil strife in the city in 423 BC, and an attempt by Brasidas to take it failed. By the 380s Potidaea was a member of the Chalcidian League, from which Timotheus captured it, together with Torone, in 364/3 BC. Pro-Athenian Potidaeans then asked Athens for further settlers, and in 362/1 BC the city became a cleruchy for the second time.

=== Philip II and the end of the city ===
In 356 BC Philip II, with Chalcidian help, took Potidaea after a siege; Athenian relief arrived too late. He sent the Athenian cleruchs home, sold the Potidaeans into slavery, and gave the town and its territory to the Olynthians, to whom he had promised it.

The city itself was not destroyed. (Note: The older view, that Philip destroyed Potidaea, was held by Beloch, Arnold Schaefer and others, and a scholiast on Demosthenes 6.20 says that he burned the city after enslaving its people. See Alexander (1963), pp. 90–91.) Demosthenes, who names Olynthus, Methone and Apollonia among the cities Philip destroyed, does not say the same of Potidaea, and speaks instead of the place being given to the Olynthians to enjoy and of its being subject to Philip in 355 BC, when it was a Macedonian dependency. The Olynthians, who had helped take the city and had long wanted it, would have had no use for it in ruins. Diodorus, describing the foundation of Cassandreia in 316 BC, calls the Olynthian settlers brought there those "who survived" the destruction of their own city but mentions Potidaea without any such qualification. Partial destruction is probable, but many of the inhabitants continued to live in the town, as slaves or as subjects.

=== Cassandreia ===
Potidaea was subject to Olynthus until that city was destroyed in 348 BC and thereafter to Philip and the Macedonians. Nothing has been found that can be assigned to the years 356 to 316 BC. In 316 BC Cassander built a city on the same site, which was named Cassandreia, uniting with it the communities of the peninsula, Potidaea, and neighboring villages, and settling there the surviving Olynthians.

Cassandreia was founded as a city formally independent of the kingdom of Macedonia and allied to it, and remained so until Antigonus II Gonatas incorporated it into the kingdom after suppressing the tyranny of Apollodorus in 276 BC. Philip V of Macedon made Cassandreia a principal naval base, laying down a hundred warships there in 207 BC. The city remained a leading Macedonian center until the end of the monarchy in 168 BC. In 43 BC, a Roman colony was settled by the proconsul of Macedonia, which in 30 BC was resettled by Octavian (the future Augustus) and took the official name Colonia Iulia Augusta Cassandrensis. It was destroyed by the Huns and Slavs around AD 540.

== Coinage ==
Potidaea struck silver on the Euboic standard from some point in the 6th century until the city was taken in 356 BC, in tetradrachms, tetrobols, diobols and tritemoria. The earliest issues, of about 500 to 429 BC, show Poseidon on horseback with the legend Π or ΠΟ and an incuse square on the reverse; issues of 400 to 358 BC have a head of Athena with a Pegasus or a trident on the reverse and the legend ΠΟ or ΠΟΤΕΙ.

Bronze was struck in the 4th century and possibly earlier. The bronze coinage may have begun with the revolt of 432 BC, when some two thousand Corinthian and Peloponnesian troops were in the city, and a medium of exchange was needed; it ended with Philip's capture of the city. The types are strictly Corinthian: a head of Athena in a Corinthian helmet, with either a trident or a winged Pegasus on the reverse. Excavations at Olynthus have produced 179 published Potidaean bronzes, of which all but four are of the Athena and trident type, more than from any other major city of the Chalcidic peninsula, a concentration explained partly by Potidaeans settling at Olynthus after the surrender of 430 BC.

== Remains ==
Little of classical Potidaea survives, much of its material having been used in later construction, including the fortifications of Cassandreia. Excavation has revealed parts of the 5th-century walls together with 6th-century sherds. That the city was strongly fortified is clear from its resistance to the Persians for three months in 479 BC and to the Athenians for more than two years from 432 BC.

== Modern legacy ==
The modern settlement of Nea Poteidaia, built for refugees from Asia Minor after the First World War, is situated near this ancient site.

In popular culture, the fictional character Gabrielle from the TV series Xena: Warrior Princess was described as being from Potidaea.

== See also ==
- Cassandreia
- Delian League
- Peloponnesian Wars
- List of ancient Greek cities

== Sources ==
- Alexander, John A. (1963). Potidaea: Its History and Remains. Athens, Georgia: University of Georgia Press.
- Flensted-Jensen, Pernille (2004). "Thrace from Axios to Strymon". In Hansen, Mogens Herman; Nielsen, Thomas Heine (eds.). An Inventory of Archaic and Classical Poleis. Oxford: Oxford University Press. pp. 810–853.
