= Aenea (city) =

Ancient city in Chalcidice, Greece

Coordinates: 40°28′38″N 22°49′44″E

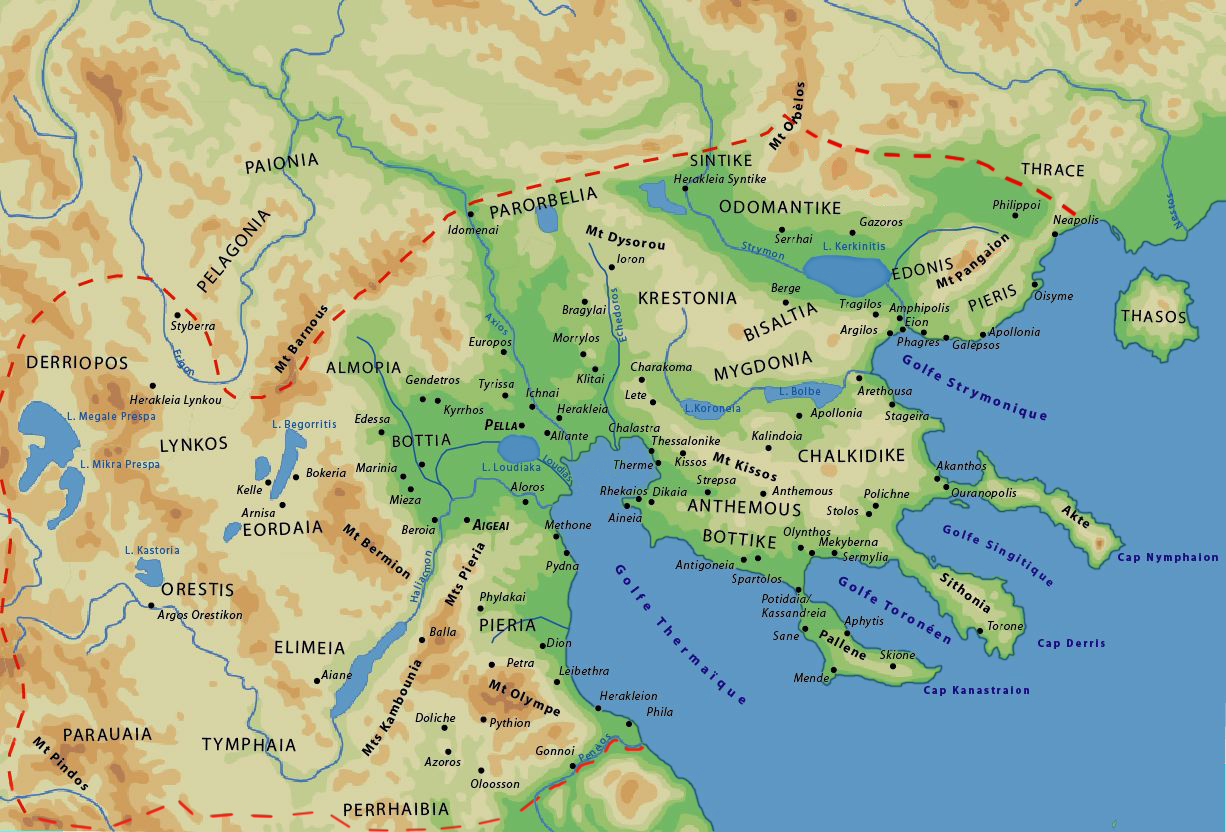
Macedonia and the Chalcidice

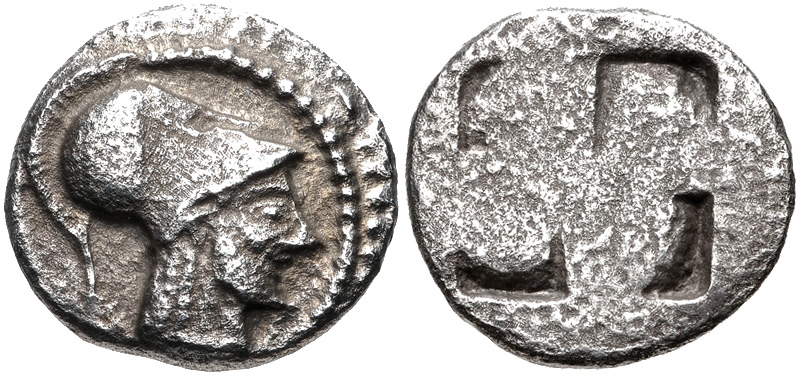
Coinage of Aeneia, with portrait of Aeneas.Circa 510-480 BC.

Aenea (/əˈniːə/; Ancient Greek: Αἴνεια, Aineia) was an ancient Greek city in northwesternmost Chalcidice, said to have been founded by Aeneas, and was situated, according to Livy, opposite Pydna, and 15 miles from Thessalonica. It appears to have stood on the promontory of Megalo Embolo, which forms the northwest corner of the peninsula of Chalcidice, and which, being about 10 geographical miles in direct distance from Thessalonica, may be identified with the promontory Aeneium of Pseudo-Scymnus. Aeneia must therefore have been further north than Pydna.

It was colonised by the Corinthians. It is mentioned by Herodotus, and continued to be a place of importance down to the time of the Roman wars in Greece, although we are told that a great part of its population was removed to Thessalonica, when the latter city was founded by Cassander. The city minted coins in antiquity, some of which survive today.

The site of Aenea is located near modern Michaniona.

== See also ==
- List of ancient Greek cities
