= Bottiaeans =

The Bottiaeans or Bottiaei (Ancient Greek: Βοττιαῖοι) were an ancient people of uncertain origin, living in Central Macedonia. Sometime during the Archaic era they were expelled by Macedonians from Bottiaea to Bottike. During the Classical era, they played an active role in the military history of ancient Chalcidice, but after the Macedonian conquest under Philip II nothing remained except the names of these two regions and the adjective Bottiaean, which was limited to a geographical meaning. Unlike other tribes of Macedonia ruled by kings or living in villages, the Bottiaeans developed some polis form of self-government. No Bottiaean individual is known to historians and the limited historical or archaeological sources shed no further light.

== Origin ==
According to Strabo, the Bottiaeans were Cretans who sailed with Minos to Sicily, but on the voyage back they were driven out of their course and reached Macedonia. They were named Bottiaeans after their leader Βόττων, Botton, in pre-Argead Macedonia (Emathia), most of which, as Strabo says, was held by Bottiaeans and Thracians, as well as Paionians and Epirotes.

According to Plutarch, they were Athenian slaves of Minoan Crete:

And Aristotle himself also, in his 'Constitution of the Bottiaeans', clearly does not think that these youths were put to death by Minos, but that they spent the rest of their lives as slaves in Crete. And he says that the Cretans once, in fulfillment of an ancient vow, sent an offering of their first-born to Delphi, and that some descendants of those Athenians were among the victims, and went forth with them; and that when they were unable to support themselves there, they first crossed over into Italy and dwelt in that country round about Iapygia, and from there journeyed again into Thrace and were called Bottiaeans; and that this was the reason why the maidens of Bottiaea, in performing a certain sacrifice, sing as an accompaniment "Let us go to Athens!"

The same story is related by the Roman-era mythographer Conon. Homer and early Epic poets make no mention of them. Herodotus in 7.185.1 lists them along with various other tribes in the Xerxes I's European army. In 8.127.1:

Artabazus laid siege to Potidaea, and suspecting that Olynthus too was plotting a revolt from the king, he laid siege to it also. This town was held by Bottiaeans who had been driven from the Thermaic Gulf by the Macedonians. Having besieged and taken Olynthus, he brought these men to a lake and there cut their throats and delivered their city over to the charge of Critobulus of Torone and the Chalcidians. It was in this way that the Chalcidians gained possession of Olynthus

Thucydides (2.99) includes Bottiaeans with other deported nations by Macedonians. They were deported from Bottiaea to Bottike after the expulsion of the Pieres from Pieria to Pieris. According to The Cambridge Ancient History:

this may have happened some time after 650 BC or so, because excavations at Olynthus show that regular occupation started not before 650 BC. If the Bottiaeans came originally from Crete, we have an explanation for the appearance in this part of Macedonia of the cult of the double-axe (labrys), a cult and symbol which spread to Glasinac and far into Central Europe. Other Minoan features are the importance of priestess and the type of head-dress...in the matter of weapons and pendants, the Bottiaeans shared the tastes of Illyrians. They had not made Vergina their capital, although their influence was strong there. In their new home they were conservative in their ways and showed no signs of contact with the coastal Greeks

However, if two 6th and early 5th century BC cow-and-calf coins found in Bottiaea belong to Bottiaeans, it seems that not all of them were expelled.

Some toponyms of Bottiaea have been proposed as having Cretan origin (Gortynia - Gortys, Axius - Oaxos, Europos - Europa etc.) but nothing is conclusive. Various origins have been speculated: for example, Minoan, Athenian and Mycenaean.

== League ==
Spartolos the chief city of Bottiaeans in Bottike, was one of the first (454 BC) and stable members of the Delian League under the Thracian phoros. It appears in most of the Athenian tribute lists except in 446/5 BC; there we have the phrase Bottiaeans and s.. Βοττια[ῖοι καὶ σ], which may be read as Bottiaeans and Spartolos or Bottiaeans and synteleis (contributors).

No doubt the Bottiaean league was formed between 432 and 421. In the beginning of the Peloponnesian War, Bottiaeans and Chalcidians revolted from the Athenian Empire (432 BC, Thuc. 1.57). In 429 BC the Athenians arriving before Spartolus in Bottike, they destroyed the corn and had some hopes of the city coming over through the intrigues of a faction. In the battle of Spartolos, the heavy Chalcidian infantry, the Spartolian psiloi and peltasts from Crusis and Olynthus, jointly defeated the Athenian army and set up a trophy, took up their dead, and dispersed to their several cities (Thuc. 2.79.1).

In 425 BC Bottiaeans and Chalcidians defeated again the Athenian general Simonides (Thuc.4.7.1), when he attacked Eion. However, in the Athenian tribute list of 425/4 BC, Spartolians is mentioned. The name is partly restored. Only ΣΠ is legible and since no other name in the Thracian phoros begins with Sp, the restoration seems inevitable. Olynthus Ὀλ[ύνθιοι] also is listed next.

In 422 BC or after, before or as a consequence of the Peace of Nicias, Athenians made a special alliance and oath with Bottiaeans. As the inscription reads with the boule and strategoi of Bottiaeans, as well the other archontes of the Bottiaean cities. Not all the names of the cities are legible; only Kalindoia, Tripoiai, Kemakai or Kamakai and Aioleion or Haioleion. This mention of Kalindoia, a city of Mygdonia, means that Bottike may refer either to regions of Mygdonia and Chalcidice, inhabited by Bottiaeans or that Bottiaean cities existed also outside of geographical Bottike.

In early 4th century BC, Bottiaeans are mentioned, for the last time, in a treaty between Amyntas III and the Chalcidians: With the Amphipolitans, Bottiaeans, Acanthians and Mendaeans, they shall not make friendship, neither Amyntas nor the Chalcidians separately, but with common consent;.

As for the silver and bronze coinage of Bottice (Βοττιαίων, of Bottiaeans) it may be categorized to : 1. the same type of Chalcidian League coins (Apollo or Artemis with cithara or lyre) which means that they were at that time allies of Chalcidians. 2. Demeter and forepart of bull in incuse square.

There were between six and twelve Bottiaean cities: Spartolos, Kalindoia, Kamakai, Tripoiai, Haioleion and Olynthos (until 479). Other six cities can be classified as probable Bottiaean: Kithas, Tinde, Prassilos, Pleume, Sinos and Thamiskos.

== Aftermath ==
In the Hellenistic and Roman era the name Bottiaean denotes of the Bottiaea district. In epigraphy, the Macedonians for clarification used the suffix -eatai Βοττεάται Βοττεατῶν, Botteatai, Botteatôn (cf. Italiotes and Egyptiotes). It may refer either to coins or to the inhbabitans of Bottiaea.

The phrase of Stephanus of Byzantium that Nikaea in Bithynia was a colony of Bottiaeans (Bottiaiôn apoikos) may mean that Lysimachus used as colonists population from Bottiaea or Bottike. The citizens of Kalindoia must have been relocated somewhere else, since the city was given to Macedonians. Some towns of Bottike may also have been among the 26 relocated settlements under Cassander for the creation of Thessalonica.
