= Aeolium =

Town in ancient Macedonia, belonging to the Delian League

Coordinates: 40°18′09″N 23°10′54″E

Aeolium or Aioleion (Ancient Greek: Αἰόλειον) was a town of Chalcidice in ancient Macedonia. It belonged to the Delian League since it appears in the tribute registry of Athens for the years 434/3, 433/2 and 429/8 BCE, where it paid a phoros of 500 drachmas. It also appears in a treaty of alliance between the Athenians and Bottiaeans dated to 422 BCE, from which it is deduced that it belonged to the territory of Bottiaea. However, in a fragment of Theopompus collected by Stephanus of Byzantium, Aeolium is cited as a city of the Thracian Chersonesus.

Its site is near modern Bottike.
