= Eion (disambiguation) =

Eion was a city of ancient Macedonia.

Eion may also refer to:

- Eion (given name)
- Eion (Argolis), a town of ancient Argolis
- Eion (Pieria), a town of ancient Pieria
- Eion (Thrace), a town of ancient Thrace
