= Sinú =

Sinú may refer to:

- Sinú River, Colombia
- The Zenú, also known as Sinú, peoples of Colombia
- "Sinu" (Masterpiece song), a 2009 song by Malaysian band Masterpiece
- Sinúfana language, an extinct and poorly known language of Colombia also called Sinú

== See also ==
- Sinew, a tough band of fibrous connective tissue that connects muscle to bone
- Sinus (disambiguation)
- Sino (disambiguation)
- Seenu (disambiguation)
