= Xenophon (son of Euripides) =

Athenian military commander, son of Euripides

Xenophon (Ancient Greek: Ξενοφῶν), son of Euripides, was one of the Athenian generals to whom Potidaea surrendered. Later, in the same year (429 BC) Xenophon and two other generals led an expedition against the Chalcideans and Bottiaeans at the Battle of Spartolos. Xenophon and the other generals, alongside 430 men, were killed and their forces were compelled to retreat into Potidaea.
