= Atalanta (Bottiaea) =

Ancient city of Bottiae

- Ἀταλάντη (Ancient Greek)
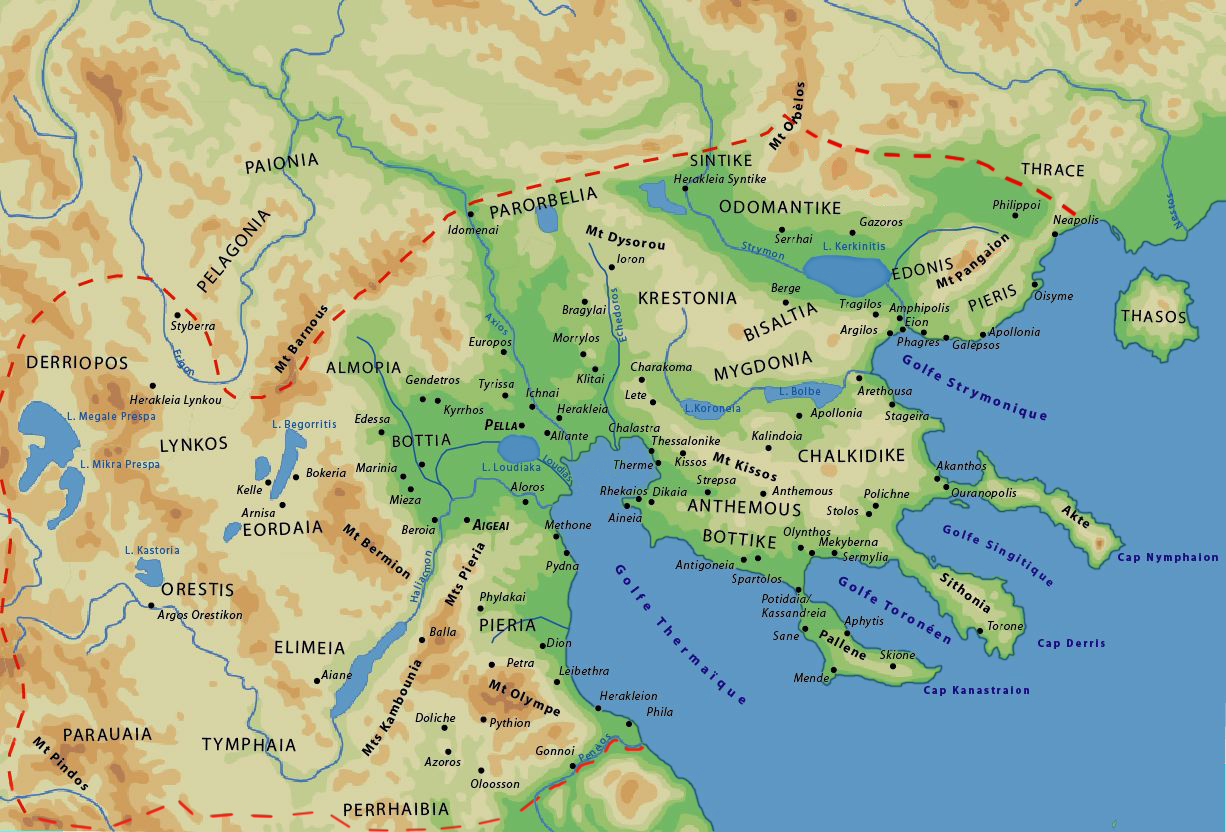
- 40°44′05″N 22°34′06″E

Atalanta (Ancient Greek: Ἀταλάντη, romanized: Atalante) or Allante (Ἀλλάντη) or Allantium was an ancient city of Bottiaea, ancient Macedon, between Gortynia and Europos, in the upper part of the valley of the Axius river, which may have been built by the Bottiaeans before their expulsion by Macedonians to Bottike. Axioupoli of today's Kilkis regional unit claims to be the ancient location. N. G. L. Hammond places it between Athyra, Pella regional unit and Koufalia, Thessaloniki regional unit

Thucydides mentions Atalante, south of Gortynia. Stephanus of Byzantium, Allante (Ἀλλάντη), a city of Arcadia and Macedonia. Allantenses are reported among the list of peoples by Plinius (HN 4.53). In the lists of Delphian theorodokoi (230–220 BC), after Ichnae and before Thessalonica, the inscription reads: ἐν Ἀλλ[α]ντείωι Ἀνδρόνικος Δίκαιος Χιωνίδου, In Allanteion, Andronikos and Dikaios sons of Chionides. In a Roman-era inscription found east of Pella, ἡ πόλις Ἀλλανταίων ("the city of Allanteans"), honours deified Roman emperors.

[Ἀταλα]νταῖοι, Atalantaioi, are also mentioned near to Edessaioi and Europaioi in a dedicatory inscription from Argos.

== Bibliography ==
- The Classical Gazetteer
