= Allante =

Allante may refer to:

- Allante (Arcadia), a town of ancient Arcadia
- Allante (Macedon), a city of ancient Macedon
- Cadillac Allanté, a car
