= Gordynia =

Ancient city in Greek Macedonia

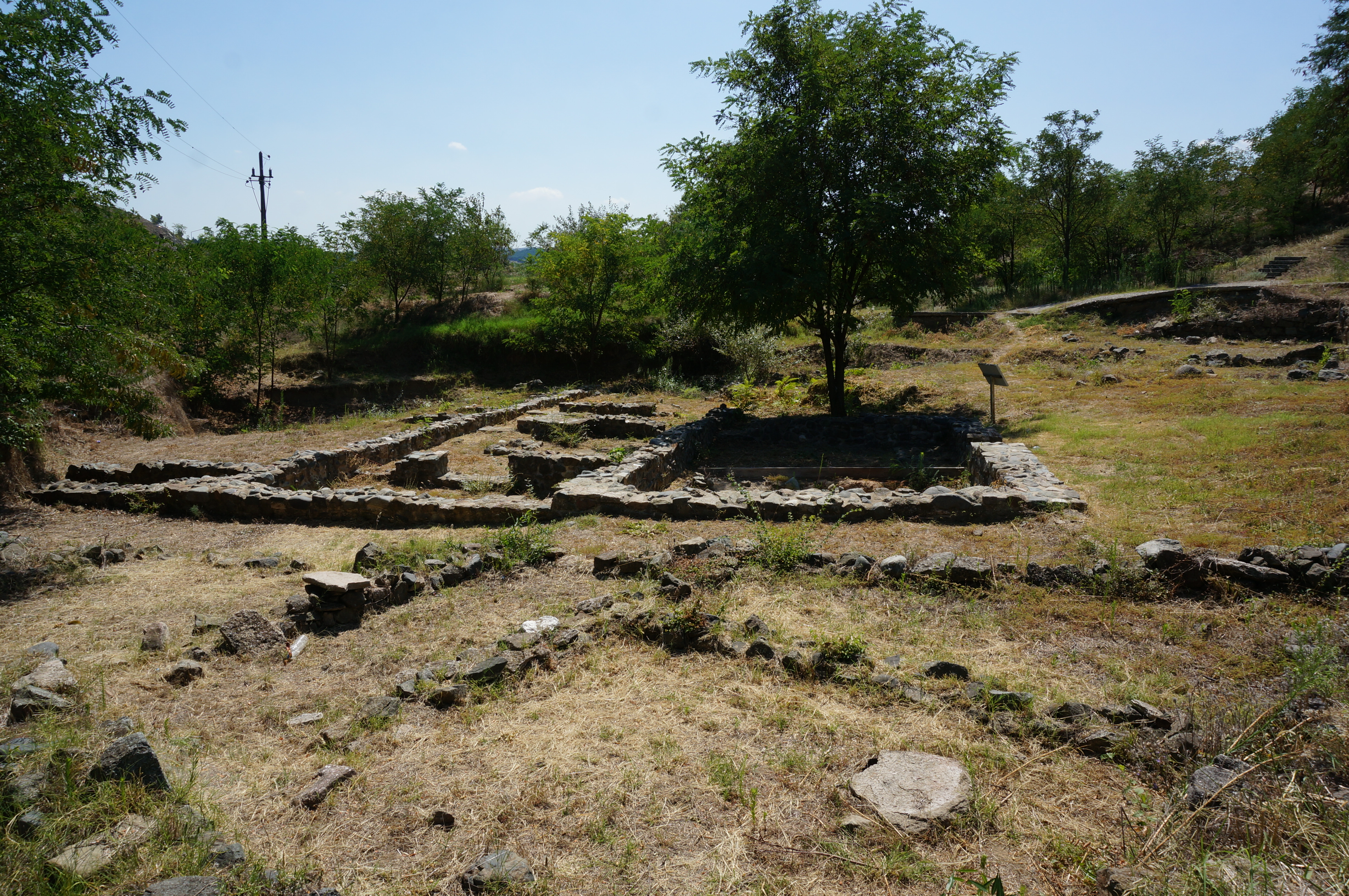
- Site at Vardarski Rid, believed to have been Gordynia.
- Interactive map of Gordynia
- 41°8′55″N 22°31′13″E

Gordynia or Gortynia or Gortynion was a settlement reached in ancient Macedonia, in the southern valley of the Axios river, northeast of Bottiaea close to the Paionian border. Ptolemy places Gordenia (Γορδηνία), in his list of cities in Emathia, after Idomenae and before Edessa. Plinius (HN 4.34) gives the name in plural, Gordyniae. Stephanus of Byzantium calls it Gordynia and its ethnic noun Gordyniates. In Thucydides (2.100) Gortynia and Atalanta came to terms with the Thracian army of Sitalces, out of regard for Amyntas the son of Philip, the brother of Perdiccas II, who accompanied the expedition.

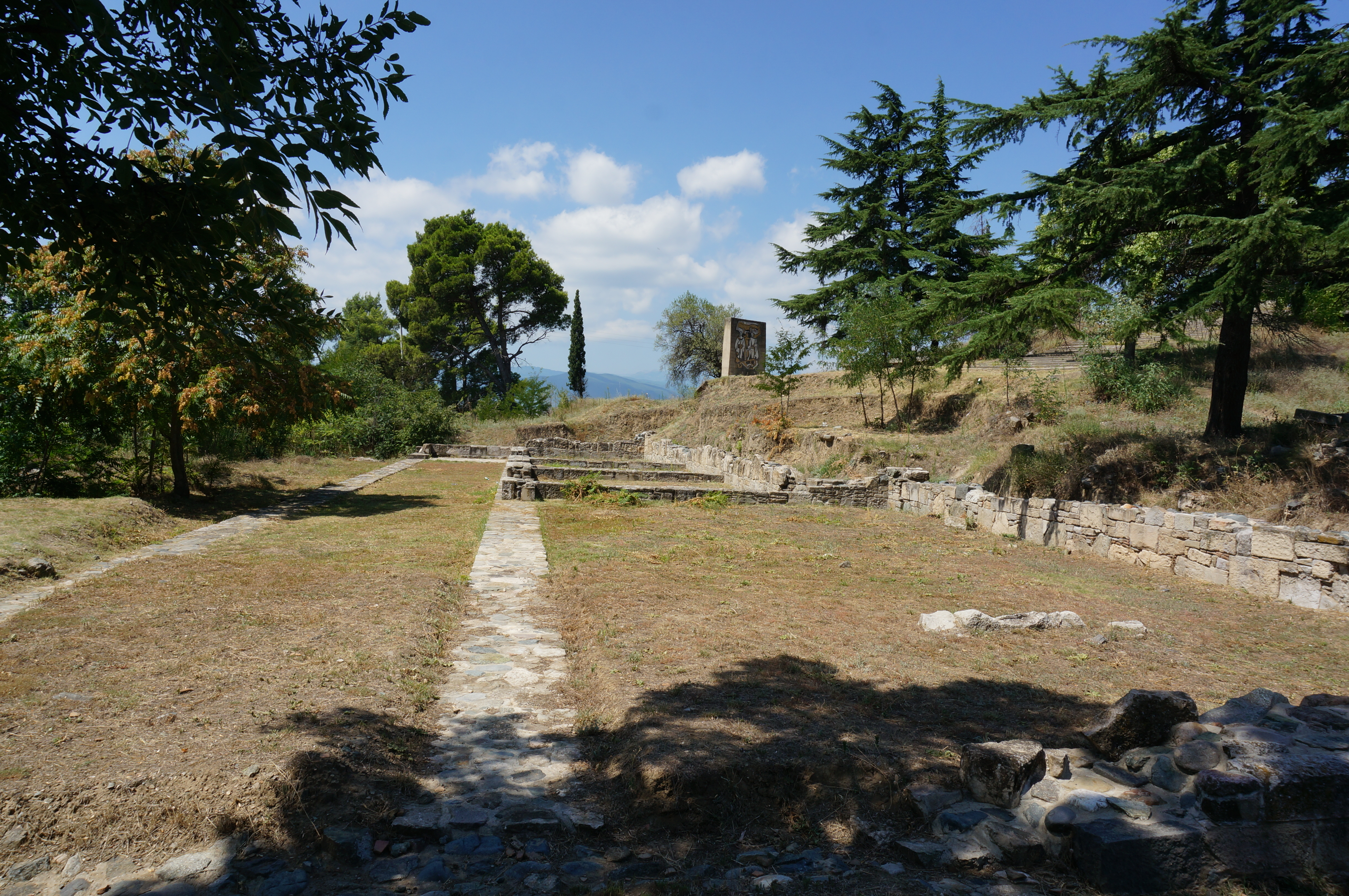
View of the forum

Hammond places Gortynion near to Axioupoli. M.B. Hatzopoulos, near to Vardarski Rid. Hammond relates the name with Cretan Gortys and the Bottiaeans who came from Crete. Photis Petsas, to Gordias, a Brygian/Phrygian name.

Gordynia is not attested in epigraphy.
