= Tripoeae =

Tripoeae or Tripoiai (Ancient Greek: Τριποιαί), or Tripoae or Tripoai (Τριποαί), was a town of the Chalcidice in ancient Macedonia. It belonged to the Delian League since it appears in the tribute records of Athens of 421/0 BCE, where it paid a phoros of 800 drachmas. It also appears in a treaty between the Athenians and Bottiaeans of 422 BCE, from which it is deduced that Tripoeae was located in Bottiaea near Calindoia. In the year 323 BCE, it was one of the cities delivered by Alexander the Great to the Macedonians.

Its site is unlocated, but was probably located in the region of Bottiaea.
