= Camacae =

Town in ancient Macedonia

Camacae or Kamakai (Ancient Greek: Καμακαί), also known as Cemacae or Kemakai (Κεμακαί), was a town of Bottiaea, Chalcidice, in ancient Macedonia. It belonged to the Delian League since it appears in the tribute registers of Athens, although only once in the year 421/20 BCE, where it paid a phoros of 600 drachmas. It is also cited in a treaty of alliance between the Athenians and Bottiaeans of the year 422 BCE from which it is deduced that it belonged to the territory of Bottiaea and that was a neighbor of Calindoia, but its exact location is unknown. In the year 323 BCE, it was one of the cities delivered by Alexander the Great to Macedonians.

Its site is unlocated.
