= Spartolus =

Ancient Greek city

Coordinates: 40°18′59″N 23°09′35″E

Spartolus or Spartolos (Ancient Greek: Σπάρτωλος) was the chief city of the Bottiaeans, perhaps in Bottike, in the northwest of the ancient Chalcidice, at no great distance from Olynthus. It was a member of the Delian League under the Thracian phoros, paying 2 or 3.5 talents, until the beginning of the Peloponnesian War, when the Bottiaean and the Chalkidian League revolted against Athens in 429 BCE. The ensuing Battle of Spartolos, fought under the walls of Spartolos, saw the rout of the Athenian forces by the Chalcideans. It was of sufficient importance to be mentioned in the treaty establishing the Peace of Nicias between Athens and Sparta in the tenth year of the Peloponnesian War, in 421 BCE, leaving the town neutral. It seems however that sometime later it became again an Athenian allied member. It is mentioned again in connection with the Spartan Teleutias' attack on Olynthus in 381 BCE.

The last mention of Spartolos is not as a city but among other agricultural territories (c. 305-297 BCE) in a royal decree of Cassander about land leasing to a certain Perdikkas son of Koinos (the lands had partly been awarded by Philip II of Macedon to Polemokrates, his grandfather).

Its site is located in the western part of the Chalcidice.
