= Armenian Relief Society =

US-based non-governmental organization

- Formation: 1910
- Founder: Khachatur Malumian
- Founded at: New York City, New York
- Legal status: Non-governmental organization
- Purpose: Humanitarian aid
- Headquarters: Boston, Massachusetts
- Region served: United States, Canada, South America, Europe, Middle East, Australia
- Main organ: Hye Sird
- Website: ars1910.org

The Armenian Relief Society (ARS) (Armenian: Հայ Օգնութեան Միութիւն, Հ.Օ.Մ. H.O.M.) is an independent, nonsectarian, philanthropic society serving the humanitarian, social and educational needs of Armenians and non-Armenians alike. It operates as a non-governmental organization and has entities in 27 countries.

== Founding ==
In January 1910, renowned intellectual Khachatur Malumian (also known as Edgar Agnouni), upon arriving in the United States, encouraged Armenian women to take a more active role in the service of the Armenian people. Thus, in a period of a ten months, Malumian organized the existing women's groups as a cohesive nationwide society. The number of chapters grew slowly, and by the date of its third Convention, there were 31 registered chapters across the United States and Canada.

== Purpose and activity ==
- To serve the humanitarian needs of all communities that may require emergency aid, regardless of ethnic origin or religious affiliation;
- To preserve the cultural identity of the Armenian people, worldwide;
- To promote the educational, social, health and welfare of communities;
- To enhance the education of the Society's members and encourage their involvement in public service;
- To encourage participation in local organizations engaged in community activities and social services compatible with the principles of the Society;
- To act as a focal point at the informational level; and
- To cooperate with organizations with similar aims.

== The first decade (1910–1920) ==
Prior to the founding of the Armenian Relief Society, women in Armenia functioned under the name of the "Armenian Red Cross". These women performed tasks in the Caucasus, Aderbadagan, Vasbouragan, Trebizond, Erzerum, Kharpert and other regions of Armenia. They cared for the wounded and provided food, shelter, clothing, and medicine to Armenian victims of pillage and plunder; in various locations, the ARC also attended to the educational needs of the Armenian people.

In September 1910, Khachadoor Malumian arrived in the United States for a tour of the Armenian communities around the country. Through his teachings, writings, and group discussions, he encouraged Armenian women to take a more active role in the service of the Armenian people. Thus, in a period of a few months, Agnouni organized the existing women's groups and through their union founded the ARF Red Cross.

The first few years were devoted to planning and internal organization. The number of chapters grew rapidly, and by the first convention, held in May 1915 in Boston, Massachusetts, there were 33 registered chapters across the United States and Canada. This first convention, held during the First World War, discussed the immediate and most pressing issues of the time and ratified the following: fundraising to assist suffering Armenians world-wide; a clothing drive for Armenian refugees in the Caucasus; training of nurses to be sent to the war front to take care of the wounded; Armenian language courses for its membership; a membership drive; founding Armenian schools wherever chapters existed. A five-member Central Executive board, elected at the first convention took charge of coordinating the activities of various chapters in the implementation of the decisions taken by the convention.

The second convention convened in Boston on June 2, 1919. The first item was to welcome the creation of the Armenian Republic (May 28, 1918) and to formally recognize the Armenian Red Cross of the Republic. The convention also decided to change the society's name to the "Armenian Red Cross" (in Armenian) and "Daughters of Armenia" (in English). The 2nd convention also resolved to conduct a campaign to raise funds to establish a hospital in the Republic of Armenia and to strive to bring together all existing charitable and philanthropic organizations under the same name, for the common cause of serving the Armenian nation.

== The second decade (1921–1930) ==
The activities of the second decade of the Armenian Red Cross are best defined by the reorganization and establishment of chapters across North America, Europe, the Middle East, and other parts of the world. The primary concentration of the ARC's efforts was on provision of emergency relief to refugees, establishment of dispensaries, and food and clothing distribution centers.

Despite the difficult conditions in many Armenian Diaspora communities, the ARC did not limit its activities merely to the physical sustenance of Armenian refugees; it simultaneously implemented a large-scale education, cultural and social program world-wide. In the years following the fall of the Republic this was of high importance as the preservation of the Armenian identity was necessary.

The ranks of the society were transformed into schools, where members were educated in principles of Armenian existence. Girl-Scout troops and young adolescent groups were founded alongside Armenian Red Cross chapters.

== The third decade (1931–1940) ==
By the beginning of the 3rd decade the society's existence had grown to 10 regions which were affiliated with the U.S. headquarters: France, Greece, Thrace-Macedonia, Iraq, Iran, Bulgaria, Romania, Syria, Lebanon, and Egypt.

The ARC had become a veritable stronghold for the preservation of the Armenian cultural identity. This marked the start of a new era for the organization, with a stronger volunteer force to establish schools, and colleges, trade/training centers, and youth camps.

The international network of the ARC branched out with the increasing number of chapters and volunteers. In 1939 the organization launched its official publication the ARS Quarterly, which later became Hye Sird, and officially changed its name to the Armenian Relief Society.

The relatively stable and self-sufficient state of Armenian communities, achieved during the third decade of the ARS, was again shaken, this time by the outbreak of the Second World War. Once again, war, conscription crisis, and hardships created unforeseen circumstances and needs. Establishments were damaged by bombardment: there was lack of food and medicine which gave rise to diseases in many Armenian communities. Once again, the Armenian Relief Society took on the responsibility of providing emergency relief to the affected areas. The ARS mobilized its chapters and members worldwide to dispense medicine, clothing and food everywhere, to rescue refugees and prisoners of war.

During the years stretching from 1930 to 1950, changing situations and new experiences further strengthened the internal structure of the ARS. Lebanon became a separate region and new entities joined the ARS family: Jerusalem; Haifa; Amman; and South America. Programs in Armenian education took on a wider importance; health and relief activities were systematized.

== Rejuvenation and development ==
The year 1950 marked a new era for the pan-Armenian ARS family. Spread over all Diasporan communities and having acquired new experiences, strength, and talent, the ARS moved forward with increased momentum and renewed plans. In subsequent decades, existing ARS Social Service Centers were modernized and staffed with professionals; others were established in needed areas. The ARS explored new means to establish schools and initiate youth programs; efforts were also directed to improve existing educational programs. The ARS initiated a scholarship program, with emphasis on providing awards to students attending institutions of higher learning in Armenian education. Theater groups, choral societies and dance ensembles were formed in many communities. The Detroit ARS School was founded with funds generated by the ARS 60th Anniversary fundraising campaign. And among the important accomplishments of the ARS was the creation of its Summer Studies Program.

For the ARS, the 1970s were characterized by the Central Executive's concentrated efforts to promote Armenian education on the North American continent and to provide financial assistance to the newly created Armenian day schools in the United States and Canada. During the same decade, the ARS devoted much time and talent to the amendment of its bylaws, with the purpose of strengthening the internal functioning of the ARS Regions by making them autonomous entities within a pan-Armenian structure.

Thus, the 59th ARS Convention held in 1979, ratified the revised ARS Bylaws and created the Armenian Relief Society of North America. This improved structure provided the opportunity for the ARS Central Executive, the international governing body, to pursue the wider Diaspora issues of the Armenian people by strengthening the pan-Armenian activities and programs of the ARS, leaving the coordination of the activities of the Chapters in the US and Canada to the North American Regional Executive.

A few years later, following the general guidelines of the ARS Bylaws, The ARS of Western USA was formed to represent the Western US chapters of the Society effective July 1984. Similarly, in 1990 the Canadian chapters, having already met the organizational prerequisites, also became a separate ARS Region.

During the long civil war in Lebanon, the Armenian Relief Cross of Lebanon, in cooperation with the ARS Central Executive, took it upon itself to tend to the physical and emotional wounds of the Armenian community in that country.

In the 1980s, having revitalized itself with a new and dynamic organizational structure, the ARS set out with brisk and lively strides to tackle the new challenges of a new era. The Fund for Armenian Resources was created, to be used in emergencies. The worldwide network of the organization was expanded and strengthened. The ranks of the ARS were rejuvenated and developed, raising the standards and image of the organization.

== New challenges and horizons ==
In the late 1980s, soon after the Artsakh (Karabakh movement) began, whole Armenian communities were uprooted from the Azerbaijani cities of Baku, Sumgait and Kirovabad. The ARS was the first among humanitarian organizations to provide funds to shelter the thousands of refugees. Moreover, within hours of the 1988 Armenian earthquake, ARS earthquake relief efforts were already underway. The ARS set its worldwide organizational network into motion and placed 80-years of experience at the service of the suffering people of Armenia, to help lessen the impact of the disaster, to ensure their survival, and to help them reconstruct a better future.

During the years that led to the independence of Armenia, the ARS worked diligently to reorganize its entity within Armenia, the Armenian Relief Cross, which announced its presence in August 1991, and held its first Regional Convention.

Just a few weeks prior to the announcement of the establishment of the Armenian Relief Cross, the ARS Central Executive announced the reorganization of three chapters-at-large in Bulgaria. In October 1992, for the first time ever, the ARS held its International Convention (the 64th) in Armenia.

Since then, Chapters have been organized in Russia, Sweden, Artsakh, Germany, Javakhk (Georgia), the United Arab Emirates, and Switzerland.

On 2 March 1995, the ARS officially inaugurated its office in Washington, DC, which had been in operation since May 1994. It was created jointly by the ARS Central Executive, the ARS of North America, and the ARS of Western USA.

At present, there are ARS Chapters in 27 countries around the world, functioning according to local governmental regulations applicable to charitable organizations.

== Regions ==
The Central Executive Office of the Armenian Relief Society is located in the Hairenik Building in Watertown, Massachusetts.

Regions	Other Names	Websites
ARS Eastern USA		http://arseastusa.org/
ARS Western USA		http://arswestusa.org/
Canada		http://ars-canada.ca/
Armenia		http://arsarmenia.org/
Australia		
Bulgaria		
France	Croix Bleue Des Armeniens De France	https://croixbleue-france.com/
Greece		
Lebanon		http://lokh-arcl.org/eng/
Macedonia & Thrace of Greece		
South America		
Syria		
Artsakh		
Cairo		
Cyprus		
England		
Javakhk		
Germany		
Haifa		
Jaffa		
Jerusalem		
Jordan		
Kuwait		
Russia		
Stockholm		
Switzerland		
United Arab Emirates		
Belgium		

== See also ==
- Armenian General Benevolent Union
- Social issues in Armenia
