= Sino =

Sino as a prefix generally refers to:

- China
- Greater China
- Chinese people
- Two Chinas
- Culture of China
- History of China
- Sino-Native, individuals of mixed Chinese and indigenous heritage in Sabah, Malaysia

Sino may also refer to:

- Sino Group, a property company in Hong Kong
- Sino (Café Tacuba album), the 7th studio album by Mexican rock band Café Tacuba
- Sino (Tamara Todevska album), debut album by the Macedonian singer Tamara Todevska
- Sino (name), a given name and surname

== Prefixes ==
Sinoe≈ (as in Sinodic period as well as and Sinu≈ as in sinus)

== See also ==
- Shino (disambiguation) - Any Japanese name using "Shino" is spelled Sino in the Kunrei-shiki romanization system
