= Pistasus =

Pistasus or Pistasos (Ancient Greek: Πίστασος) was a town of the Chalcidice in ancient Macedonia. It belonged to the Delian League since it appears in the tribute records of Athens for 434/3 BCE, where it had to pay a phoros of 500 drachmas. It has been suggested that Pistasus should be identified with another city that appears in another tribute register in Athens called Istasus, a suggestion accepted by the editors of the Barrington Atlas of the Greek and Roman World.

Its site is unlocated.
