= Prassilus =

Prassilus or Prassilos (Ancient Greek: Πράσσιλος), or Prasstilus or Prasstilos (Πράσστιλος), or Praxilus or Praxilos (Πράξιλος), was a town of the Chalcidice in ancient Macedonia. It belonged to the Delian League since it appears in the tribute records of Athens of 421/0 BCE, where it paid a phoros of 900 drachmas. It is cited by Stephanus of Byzantium, who places it in Macedonia.

Its site is unlocated, but was probably located in the region of Bottiaea.
