= Istasus =

Town in ancient Macedonia

Istasus or Istasos (Ancient Greek: Ἴστασος) was a town of the Chalcidice in ancient Macedonia. It belonged to the Delian League since it appears in the tribute records of Athens for 422/1 BCE, where it had to pay a phoros of 500 drachmas. It has been suggested that Istasus should be identified with another city that appears in another tribute register in Athens called Pistasus, a suggestion accepted by the editors of the Barrington Atlas of the Greek and Roman World.

Its site is unlocated.
