= Emathia (Macedonia) =

District of Lower Macedonia

Emathia (Greek: Ἠμαθία, romanized: ēmathía) is an ancient toponym for an area of Lower Macedonia on the Thermaic Gulf between the Pierian range and the Axius (Vardar). Some ancient geographers give it as the name of a town in the region, or as a name in alternation with Macedon. It was used by several classical authors as a synonym for Bottiaea or even all of Macedon.

In later poetic use, the name may vaguely refer to regions as disparate as Thessaly and Thrace. Etymologically, the Homeric name suggests the meaning "sandy." The Imathia regional unit in modern Central Macedonia, in Greece, is named after ancient Emathia.

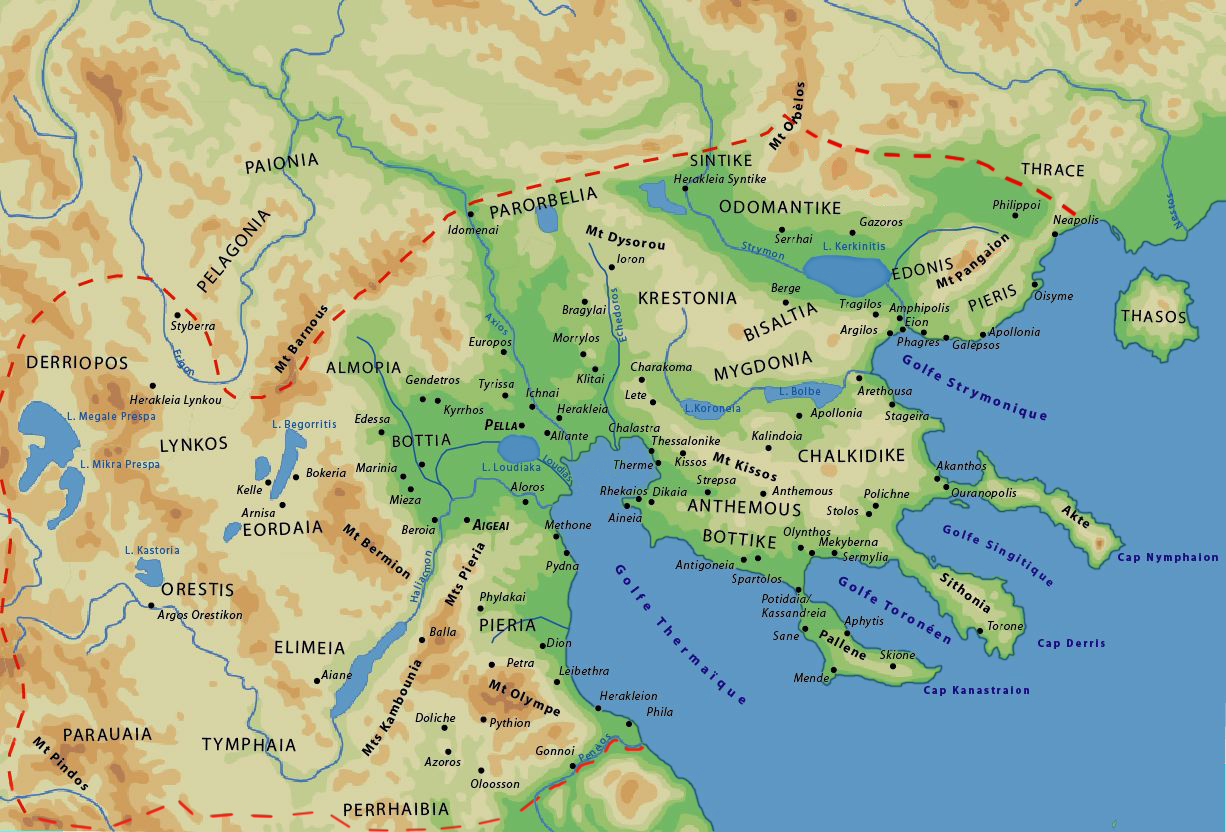
A topographic map of Macedonia. This one shows the mountains and rivers described in this section.

== Testimonia ==
=== Archaic ===
The sole homeric reference to Emathia comes from the Iliad (c. 800 BCE) as a place on Hera's journey from Olympus to Ida:

Hera in a flash of speed left the horn of Olympos / and crossed over Pieria and Emathia the lovely / and overswept the snowy hills of the Thracian riders / and their uttermost pinnacles, nor touched the ground with her feet. Then / from Athos she crossed over the heaving main sea / and came to Lemnos, and to the city of godlike Thoas.

— Homer, Iliad 14.225-30, tr. Lattimore

As Richard Janko reconstructs it, "the first leg of Her[a]'s journey takes her down the N.E. foothills of Olumpos (Pieriē) and along the Macedonian coast (Emathiei) to the 'snowy mountains of the Thracians', which are neither the Rhodope range nor Mt Pangaion behind Amphipolis (both too far N.E.). but Mt Athos itself to the S.E., whence she crosses the sea, in the same direction to Lemnos." Hera's path, which combines the notions of flight and stepping from pinnacle to pinnacle, suggests the shore-hugging navigation familiar to Greek sailors, and an island hopping traversal of the northern Aegean. An hellenistic scholion to Il. 14.226 explains that Emathia was a former name for Macedon, and lay by Thrace.

The name is reminiscent of the a homeric formula for Pylos (Greek: Πύλον ἠμαθόεντα, romanized: púlon ēmathóenta, lit. 'sandy Pylos') which appears 13 times in the homeric corpus, and once in the hesiodic Shield of Herakles.

A scholion to Theogony 985 attempts to connect Emathion, the son of Eos (dawn) mentioned there, with Emathiē, though West argues against this association, preferring to place him in Ethiopia in Arabia. The name may derive from either ēmati (Greek: ἤματι, romanized: ēmati, lit. 'daily') or amathos, "sand."

=== Classical ===
==== Thucydides ====
By the time Emathia appears in history, it is already gone. In its place stands kato Makedonia, "Lower Macedonia," as it was when it was about to be attacked by Sitalces, Thracian king of the late 5th century BC. Perdiccas II of Macedon of the Temenid Dynasty was the Macedonian king. Alexander I of Macedon, his father, "and his forefathers" had conquered Emathia earlier and had renamed it to Macedonia. These are the events described by Thucydides (Book II.99), considered their most credible narrator, because his account corresponds to that of Herodotus, their first author. Thucydides describes also Upper Macedonia (epanothen) as Macedonian also, but the original Macedon, he says, was the lower.

According to Thucydides, the Temenid Dynasty of Argos formed a new "country by the sea" by defeating tribal states arranged in a near-circle around the shores of what was then the Thermaic Gulf. It was not only near the sea, it was around it, on a strip of shoreline between the sea and the mountains. They were apparently independent as no one came to their aid, and they fell piecemeal.

The Macedonians began by attacking the Pierians of Pieria in the Pierian Mountains between the Haliakmon and Mount Olympus. They escaped by founding Piereis beyond the Strymon to the east, leaving Pieria to become the first district of Lower Macedonia. Next in order was Bottiaea. The Macedonians could not, as some modern authors suggest they might have done, follow any modern routes across the plain. There was no plain, only the Thermaic Gulf, to which access was impeded by swampland. This was a natural set-up for a victory, as only one tribal state at a time appeared before them, and there was no place where a group of them could concentrate. The Bottiaeans also were driven out. They formed the new state of Bottike on Chalcidice.

Inevitably the Macedonians reached the Paeonians, an ancient Balkan state on the Axios. All they managed to take from them was a strip of land on the right bank of the Axios, and the north shore of the gulf, including Pella. Thucydides says the purloined land extended "from the interior to Pella and the seas," which is used now to demonstrate Pella was on the gulf. On the opposite bank of the Axios was Mygdonia east to the Strymon. It was held by the Edonians. They obliged the Macedonians by escaping across the river and founding Edonis on the other side. Thus Mygdonia became Macedonian.

There are more tribes displaced over the Axios leaving their former districts to the Macedonians: Eordaeans, Almopians, Anthemians, Crestonians, Bisaltians, and others. Thucydides, however, raises as many questions as he answers. Hammond says, "The extraordinary thing about this account is that Thucydides does not tell us where the Macedones started from on their career of conquest." If extraordinary to modern historians, it may have been well known to Thucidides' target audience. From wherever it was, there must have been a relatively major movement of people from there into Emathia. One might infer that it was not very far away. At the beginning of the passage Thucydides already hints that there are Macedonians in upper Macedonia., practically within sight of the lowland villages.

==== Herodotus ====
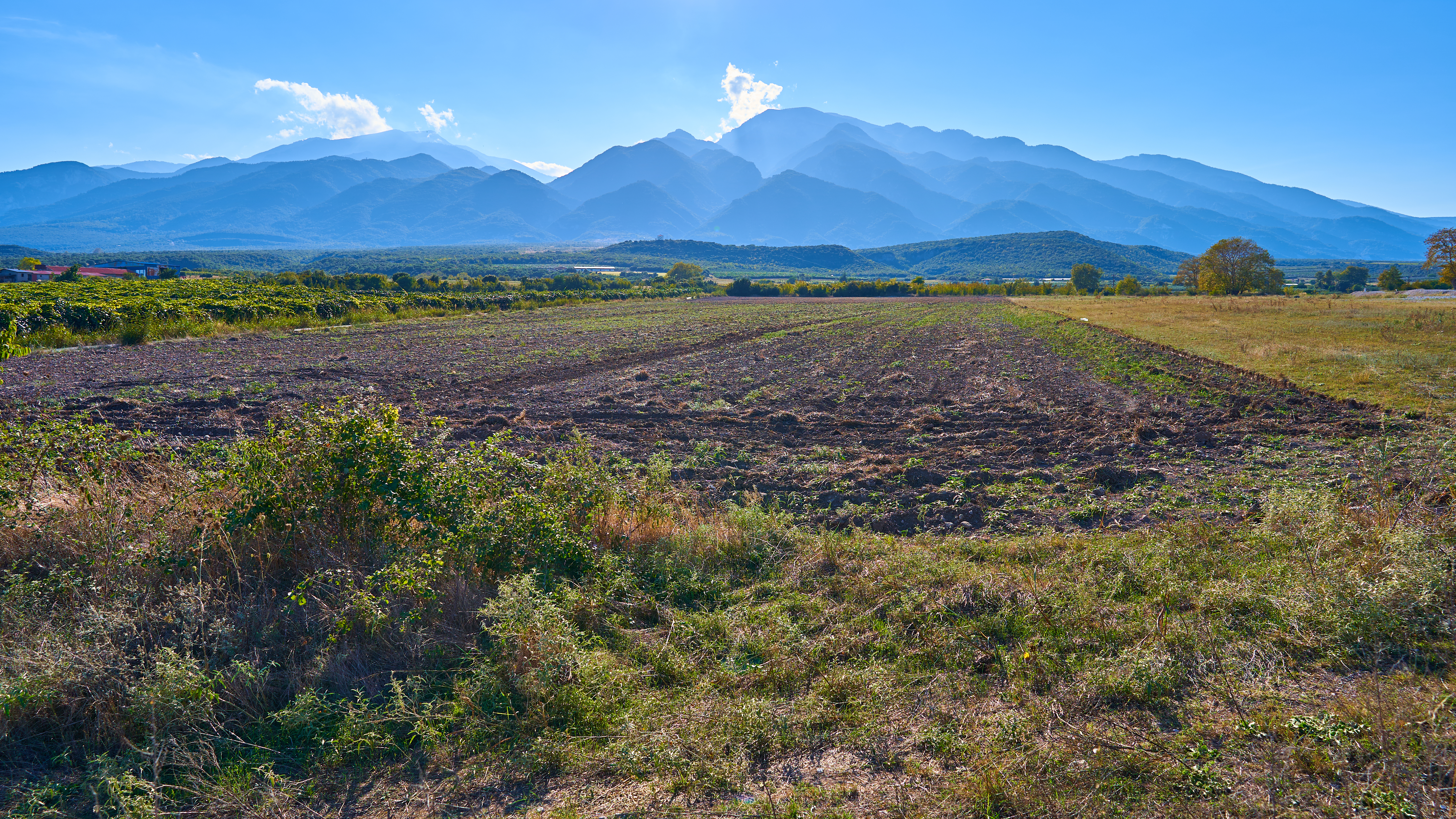
Telescopic photograph of the Macedonian Mountains from Dion in Pieria. The center peaks are the Pierian Mountains. The main peak of Olympus is to be seen in the left background. This part of the plain was perhaps extant as such in the 5th century BC. It diminishes to the left as the mountains approach the Thermaic Gulf. Xerxes looked for some way to get over this mass into Thessaly behind it.

Herodotus has something more to say about Macedonia of the late 6th and following 5th centuries BC, when it makes its first major debut in history, thanks to the Persian invasion. The story begins in Book V. Darius the Great had left an army in Thrace under his cousin Megabazus after his failed Scythian campaign of 513 BC with orders to reduce the region to satrapies. The Persian policy toward these satrapies was very liberal at the time. After a token submission, the rendering of earth and water, they were left to self-rule. The advantage to them was membership in the Persian economic sphere, but they had to cooperate with the demands of the Great King, beginning with the initial submission, about which the king would be very patient, but ultimately very insistent. He had compelled the Ionian Greeks to submit, but had left them alone until their revolt spurred him to action reluctantly. They had saved his army from total disaster against the Scythians and therefore had some credibility.

Xerxes I had resolved to invade Greece in 480 BC. He resolved to lead an army overland around the north of Greece, shadowed by and supported by a fleet keeping pace along the shore. The story is told in Book VII.

The entire north as far as, but not including, Thessaly was already "tributary to the king" (108). Thessaly was on the south side of the range. Xerxes crossed Thrace, marching inland of the coastal states that had been planted by peoples ejected by the Macedonians from Emathia, notably Piereis and Edoni. Evidently the Macedonian conquest had long been over. Most of Thrace therefore sided with the Persians.

Subsequently, the king crossed the Strymon, entering Macedonian country, which he celebrated by burning and burying alive a number of children of the village of Nine Ways in Macedonian Edonia (114). Herodotus tries to lessen the horror of this event by pointing out that the custom was intended as an offering to the gods. They were, so to speak, purchasing propitiousness for the expedition. Of course none of the Greeks viewed this as anything but a barbaric act, inflaming them against submission still further and creating solidarity where there had been none.

The Persians crossed Chalkidike. The ambivalent Greek communities there attempted to side with the king (115-117). They were forced to pay a heavy tribute in cash and goods by a suspicious king,(119) who did not offer any such terms to the Macedonians. Implicitly he was making a distinction between Thracians, Greeks of Chalkidike, and Macedonians. He continued to offer the option of submission to the Greeks of Chalkidike even though the southern Greeks not only refused but mistreated the envoys.

Seeing a major obstacle ahead, the Olympus-Pieria massifs, the king assembled his troops in Emathia with headquarters at Therma (early Thessalonika). His army was so large it required the whole coast from Therma around to the Haliakmon, about 112 km (70 mi). Supply was no problem, as they could continue to utilize the fleet. Herodotus says that all the rivers were used for water, and that one of them was drunk dry. In this part of the account the term Macedonia does not appear; instead, Herodotus uses the Emathian kingdom names, even though they were now populated by Macedonian speakers. For some reason he singles out the Axios as the border between Mygdonia and Bottiaea. Emathia is no longer mentioned.

According to one theory, the only ancient source referring indirectly to Emathia's boundaries was by Herodotus' testimony that Macedonis lay between Loudias and Haliacmon; thus Emathia (alternative name to the district of Macedonis) was bounded by Loudias to the north and the plateau of Edessa to the northwest, the valley of Haliacmon to the south along with Vermio Mountains to the southwest, and the Thermaic Gulf to the east.

=== Hellenistic and Roman ===
==== Earliest known name of Paeonia ====
Polybius (23.10.4) mentions that Emathia was earliest called Paeonia and Strabo (frg 7.38) that Paeonia was extended to Pieria and Pelagonia. According to N. G. L. Hammond, the references are related to Bronze Age period before the Trojan War.

==== Under the name of Emathia ====
The Emathian or Emathius dux is a frequently used name by Latin poets for Alexander the Great, as in Milton, the Emathian conqueror. Strabo relates that "what is now called Macedonia was in earlier times called Emathia" but since Homer, the earliest source considers Emathia only a region next to Pieria, Strabo's reference should be interpreted in the Roman era context of Emathia's name reviving. The same stands for Latin writers who name Thessaly as Emathia; the Roman province of Macedonia included Thessaly. In 12.462 of Metamorphoses, an Emathian named Halesus is killed by the centaur Latreus and in Catullus 64. 324, Peleus is Emathiae tutamen (protector).

== Geology ==
=== Subsidence and aggradation in the region ===
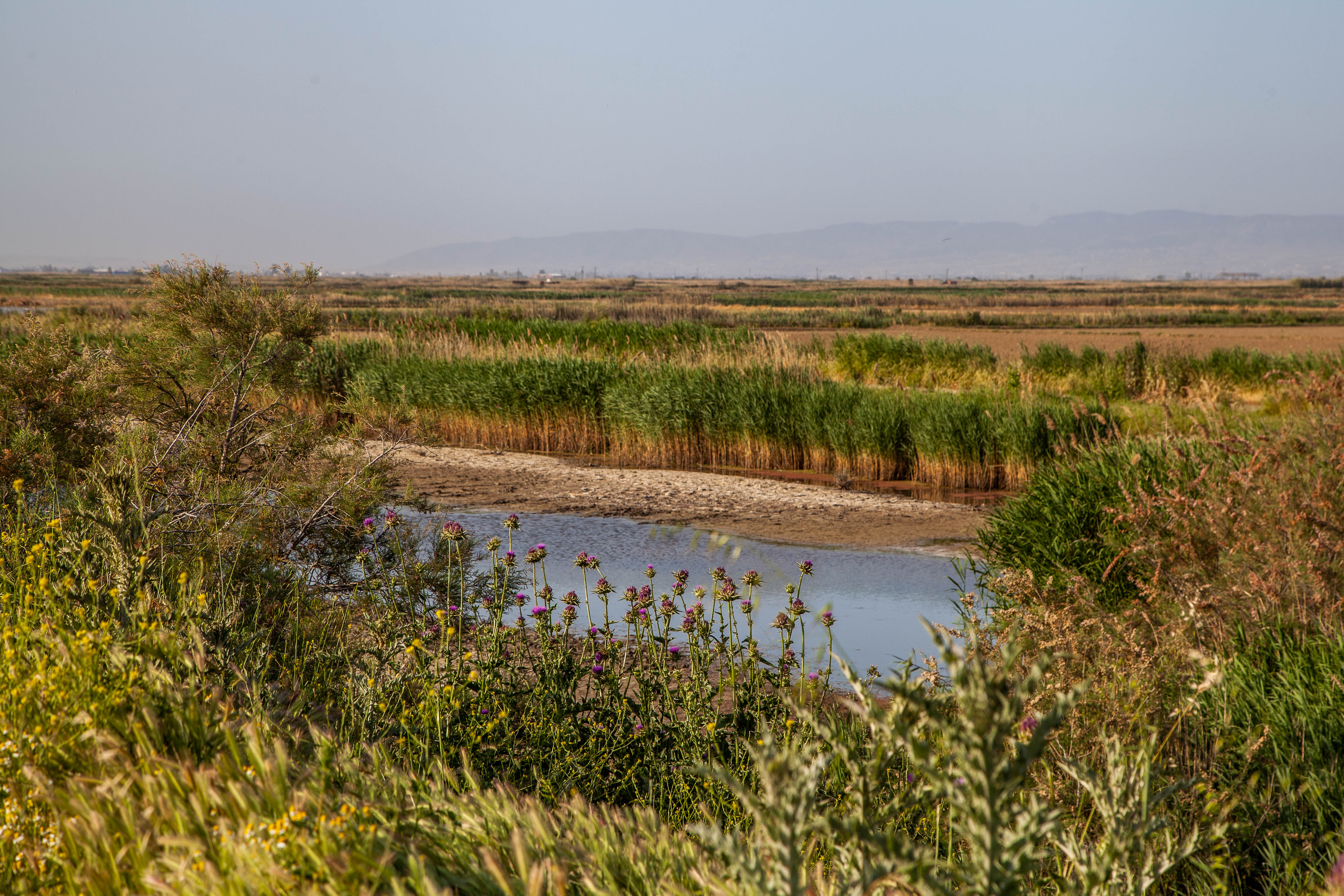
Aggradation, Axios Delta National Park. Note the sand.

The Aegean Sea Plate undergoing subsidence because of back-arc extension behind the Hellenic arc, the Aegean Sea is a classic example of drowned terrain: islands fronted by steep cliffs formed from mountain-tops, submergent coastlines with long estuaries formed by flooding from the sea. Acting contrary to the submergence is aggradation. Drowned rivers dump their sediment into their new estuaries creating river deltas. The deltas eventually combine to form alluvial shelves and valleys, which, in the Aegean, typically became agricultural areas.

Over any period, an aggraded shoreline is the result of an equilibrium between subsidence and aggradation. Subsidence pushed the coastline inland; aggradation brings it out. The equilibrium may be cyclical, or it may trend in one direction.

Core studies in the C. Macedonian Plain compared with core studies from the whole Mediterranean have established that throughout the Aegean the rate of subsidence is on the average a little less than a metre per thousand years, which expresses itself as a rise in sea level to an observer at the surface. (Note: "an overall average of rather less than a metre per millennium eustatic rise over the last 7000 years (C14). This agrees with a smoothed average from Butzer's worldwide plot (5b).") Bintliff calls this a "eustatic rise." (Note: This is a mere convention. Sea level is a global constant, except to geologists who are taking changes in the water content of the oceans into consideration. These types of water content change play a part in the storage of water in or release from global ice; otherwise, the masses changing gravitational potential in detail (by rising or falling) are rock.)

The shoreline at any isochrone; that is a line on the basin wall every part of which has the same date, obviously depends on the configuration of the surface between the location of the foot of the core and the concurrent shoreline. The more core samples that are available, the better the geologist can detail the surface. All models retain an element of speculation. In the case of the C. Macedonian Plain, Bintliff combines geological data with historical sources to develop a brief history of shorelines there.

On the map, the Plain is the green area at the mouth of the Axios River. Stretching across the Axios, it extends E-W from Thessaloniki to Naoussa, a distance of about 73.42 km (45.62 mi), and N-S from Giannitsa to Vergina, about 34.53 km (21.46 mi). This is approximately the location of modern Imathia. The latter country, however, is distinguished from the ancient by not having been there. In its place was either a shallow estuary of the Thermaic Gulf, or a lake in a marsh, from prehistoric times to nearly the present. Ancient Emathia can only have been further north, but of course at the time when the name was changed, Emathia was all of Macedonia.

=== Geologic history of the terrain over the white layer ===
Bintliff's reconstruction of the early Plain of Central Macedonia is as follows. It was not originally a plain. The orogenesis of the NW-SE trending ridges of the Hellenic Orogeny created geosynclines that became river valleys. They led from the high country of the Balkans down into a region of sub-ridges next to the Thermaic Gulf that were beginning to subside along with the rest of the floor of the Aegean. They became notches from which alluvium was eroded to be deposited into the valleys between the smaller ridges until a smooth surface covered both valleys and sub-ridges. Bintliff uses such language as "the Almopias Furrow" and "the Axios Trench."

In short the plain serves as a sink for the drainage of the surrounding highlands. Fortuitously it is roughly wheel-shaped with the rivers as spokes. The human settlements are where the spokes join the hub. They are some of the first settlements in Greece, dating from the Early Neolithic. A brief review follows, starting from the SW of the wheel, moving CW, and ending on the SE, with the Thermaic Gulf as the exit notch.

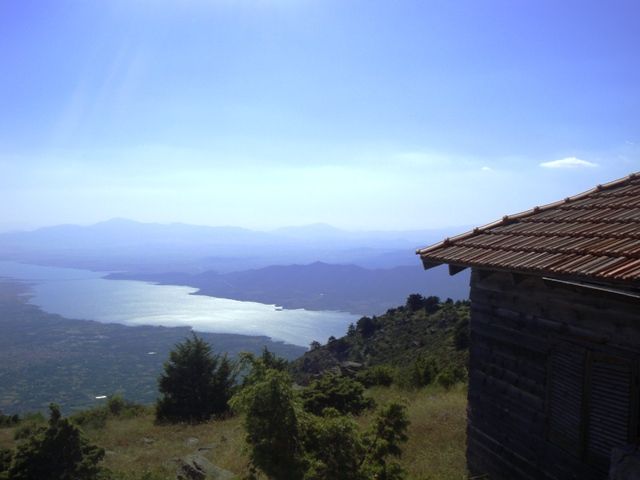
View of the Haliakmon River from a cabin in the Pierian Mountains. The size of the river reflects its impoundment there. The river flows to the right.

On the SW the upper Haliacmon River drains the east slopes of Mount Pindus on the southern border of Macedonia. At points closer to the plain it flows to the north side of the Pierian Mountains, where it is dammed in a few places to impound reservoirs. The last, Haliakmon Dam, creates an artificial lake. From there it crosses the plain to the NE, being joined by its tributary, the Moglenitsas, which ends there. The Haliakmon flows from there to the gulf at Delta Aliakmona.

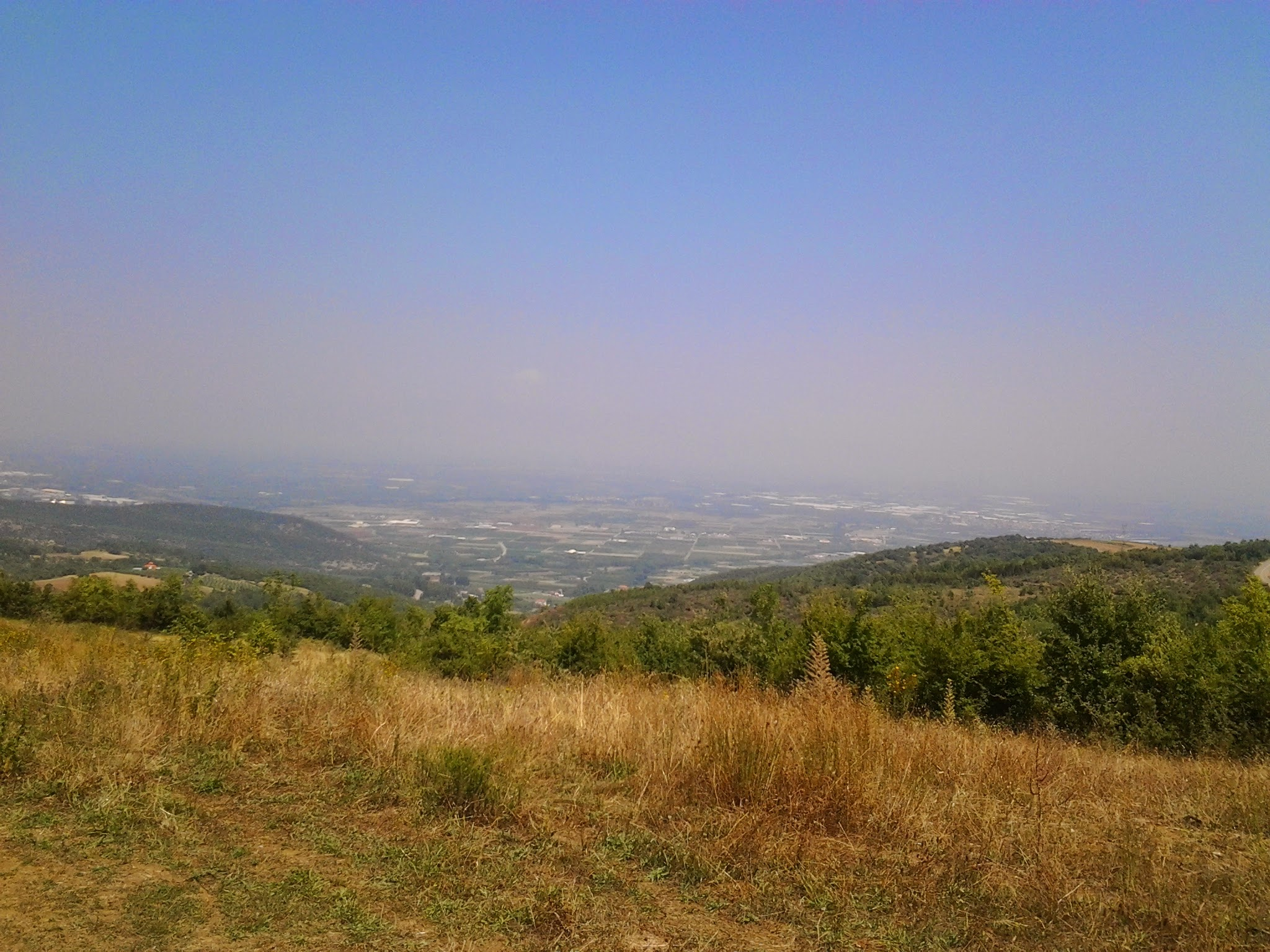
View from the Vermio Mountains eastward over the plain.

On the west of the plain the Vermio Mountains form a wall of hills trending NNE. They extend from the W bank of the Haliakmon northward into Almopia, being paralleled the entire distance by the Moglenitsas River. Various smaller streams drain the Vermio Mountains from west to east, becoming tributaries of the Moglenitsas.

The region derives ultimately from a calcic lake in a subsiding region during the Pliocene (5.33-2.58 Mya). The white, calcareous layer crystallized out of solution and was deposited over the bottom in a layer about 1 m thick. The phase lasted through the mid-Pleistocene (1.25-0.7 Myr).

In the Late Pleistocene (129,000-11700 ya) through the Early Holocene (11650-8200 bp), the lake dried up, exposing the white layer, from which weathering removed the pollen. This is the time when the white layer was probably continuous and simultaneous, with no detritus over it, at NN.

=== The ancient towns of Emathia ===
Settlements in Emathia are mainly towns of prehistoric antiquity placed around the edge of the plain, except for Nea Nikomedeia, which extended out into the plain. It was Bintliff's hypothesis that at the time ancient NN was founded, the western plain was dry. As wetlands occupied the plain from ancient to modern times, and was only recently turned to agricultural uses, there are now no cities in it.

Settlements of Emathia
Name	Location	Provenience	Picture
Methone; Μεθώνη	40°28′03″N 22°35′01″E. A hilly settlement overlooking the junction of the current NW Thermaic Gulf with the then wetlands to the north. Modern Methoni is just to the south.	Material has been found from every period from the Neolithic to the Ottoman Middle Ages. Pydna was in the vicinity.	
Veroia; Βέρροια	40°31′N 22°12′E		
Kition (modern Naoussa)			
Kydrai			
Aigai (modern Vergina)			
Kyrrhos			
Pella; Πέλλα	40°45′17″N 22°31′16″E. Originally on the stony islet of Fakos at the edge of the Thermaic Gulf. Modern faki means "lentil", meaning the shape of the islet. The ancient name, Pella, means "stony."	Early Bronze Age settlement from the 3rd millennium.	
Ichnai			
Therma			

== Citation bibliography ==
- Bintliff, John (1976). "The Plain of Western Macedonia and the Neolithic Site of Nea Nikomedeia". Proceedings of the Prehistoric Society. 42: 241–262. doi:10.1017/S0079497X00010768. hdl:1887/7952.
- Finkelberg, Margalit (2012). "Emathia". The Homer Encyclopedia. Blackwell. doi:10.1002/9781444350302.wbhe0413. ISBN 978-1-4051-7768-9.
- Ghilardi, Matthieu (2015). "Chapter 20. Geoarchaeological study of the Thessaloniki Plain (Greece): An adaptation of human societies to rapid Holocene shoreline displacements". La géoarchéologie française au xxie siècle [online]. Paris: CNRS Éditions. ISBN 9782271129932.
- Hammond, NGL (1997). "The location of Aegeae". The Journal of Hellenic Studies. 117: 177–179. doi:10.2307/632555. ISSN 0075-4269. JSTOR 632555.
- Hammond, NGL (1972). Historical Geography and Prehistory. A History of Macedonia. Vol. I. London: Oxford University Press.
- Hatzopoulos, M.B. (2004). "Makedonia". In Hansen, M.H.; Nielsen, T.H. (eds.). An Inventory of Archaic and Classical Poleis (PDF). Oxford: Oxford University Press.
- Lilibaki-Akamati, Maria (2011). "Pella, Capital of the Macedonians: Historical and Archaeological Data". The Archaeological Museum of Pella (PDF). Hellenic Ministry of Culture and Tourism. ISBN 9789609590006.
- Morris, Sarah (2014). Annual Report: Ancient Methone Archaeological Project 2014 Field School (PDF) (Report). Institute for Field Research.
- Rodden, Robert J. (1965). "An Early Neolithic Village in Greece". Scientific American. 212 (4): 82–93. doi:10.1038/scientificamerican0465-82.
- Smith, William, ed. (1854). "Emathia". Dictionary of Greek and Roman Geography. London: John Murray.
- Yiouni, Paraskevi (1992). The Pottery from Nea Nikomedeia in its Balkan Context (PhD thesis). University of London.
