= Karbasyanda =

Town of ancient Caria

Karbasyanda or Carbasianda (Ancient Greek: Καρβασυανδα) was a town of ancient Caria. It was a member of the Delian League since it appears in tribute records of Athens between the years 454/3 and 421/0 BCE, paying a phoros or 1000 drachmae. The territory of Karbasyanda bordered that of Kaunos.

Its site is suggested to be located on a hill located 1 mile (1.6 km) southwest of the ruins of Kaunos, Asiatic Turkey.
