= Serme (Chalcidice) =

Serme (Ancient Greek: Σέρμε) was a town of the Chalcidice in ancient Macedonia. It belonged to the Delian League since it appears in the tribute records of Athens between 450/49 and 432/1 BCE, where it paid a phoros of 500 drachmas, as well as in a tribute decree of 422/1 BCE.

Its site is unlocated.
