= Bricindera =

Bricindera or Brikindera (Ancient Greek: Βρικίνδηρα) was an ancient town on the island of Rhodes. It was a member of the Delian League since it is mentioned in the records of tributes to ancient Athens for 429/8 BCE, 421/0 BCE, when it paid a phoros of a talent, and 415/4 BCE. It is also mentioned in a mime of Herodas of the 3rd century BCE.

Its site is unlocated.
