= Pleume =

Coordinates: 40°17′42″N 23°12′12″E

Pleume (Ancient Greek: Πλεύμε) was a town of the Chalcidice in ancient Macedonia. It belonged to the Delian League since it appears in the tribute records of Athens between 434/3 and 429/8 BCE, where it paid a phoros of 1000 drachmas, as well as in a tributary decree of 422/1 BCE.

Its site is located in the northwestern part of the Chalcidice.
