= Sino (name) =

Sino is a given name and surname. People with this name include:

- Lou Sino (1930–1986), American trombone player and singer
- Lupe Sino (1917–1959), Spanish actress
- Sino Ganto (born 1987), South African rugby union player
- Sino Nyoka (born 1990), South African rugby union player

== See also ==
- Shino (disambiguation) - Any Japanese name using "Shino" is spelled Sino in the Kunrei-shiki romanization system
