= Ichnae =

- Ἴχναι (Greek)
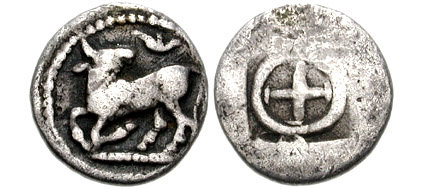
- Coin of Ichnae, dated between 479-465 BCE.

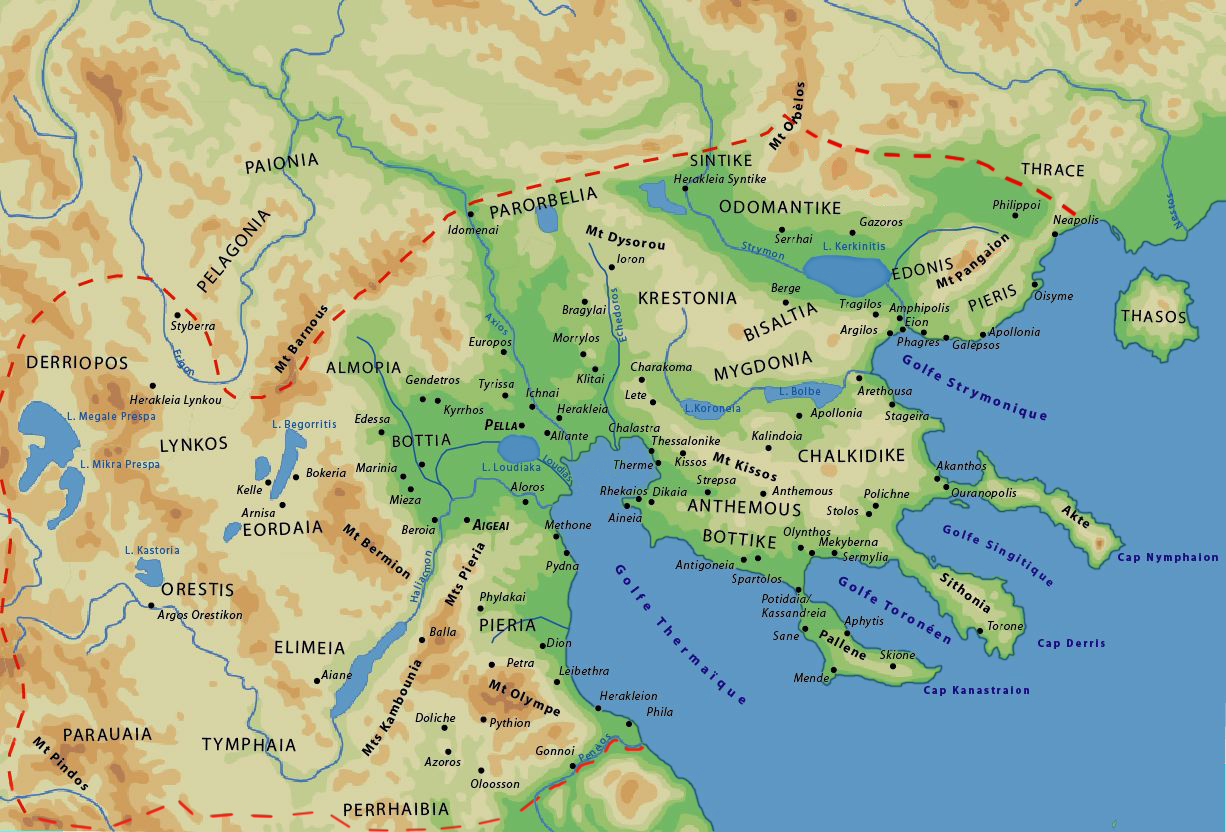
- 40°46′52″N 22°34′34″E

Ichnae or Ichnai (Greek: Ἴχναι) an ancient town of Bottiaea, Macedonia on the Thermaic Gulf, above the mouth of Loudias river, near modern Koufalia; built by the Macedonians according to Hazlitt, although Ichnaeans appear independently in epigraphy. It is mentioned by Herodotus, coupled with Pella.

Ichnai is called a polis in the urban sense in Herodotus 7.123.3 and in the political sense in a fragmentary and undated treaty between the city and Dicaea. Coins of Ichnaeans, dated to 520-480 BC, carry a bull and wheel with crescentic lateral bars and are categorized to the Thraco-Macedonian type. According to Mogens Herman Hansen, Ichnae may have been an originally South Paeonian settlement, which already in Archaic times received an influx of Southern Greek colonists. After the Macedonian conquest, settlers from the Old kingdom were added and Ichnaeans may have participated in the Macedonian colonization of Amphipolis. Two 3rd century BC reported Ichnaeans are: Antigonos son of Asandros, Delphian proxenos Δίης Dies son of Alketas, Pythian theorodokos. There is also an undated epitaph in Athens of Eurydike daughter of Dadas, Ichnaian.

Ichnae's site is within the boundaries of the modern municipal unit of Koufalia.

== Sources ==
- Hazlitt, The Classical Gazetteer, page 181
- An inventory of archaic and classical poleis By Mogens Herman Hansen, Thomas Heine Nielsen Page 802 ISBN 978-0-19-814099-3 (2004)
