= Kodza Déré Decauville Railway =

French-operated WWI military railway in Makedona

Coordinates: 41.0029°N 22.5169°E

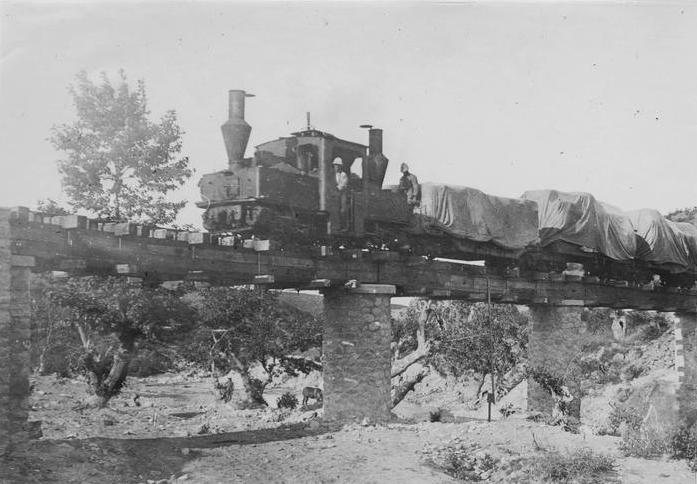
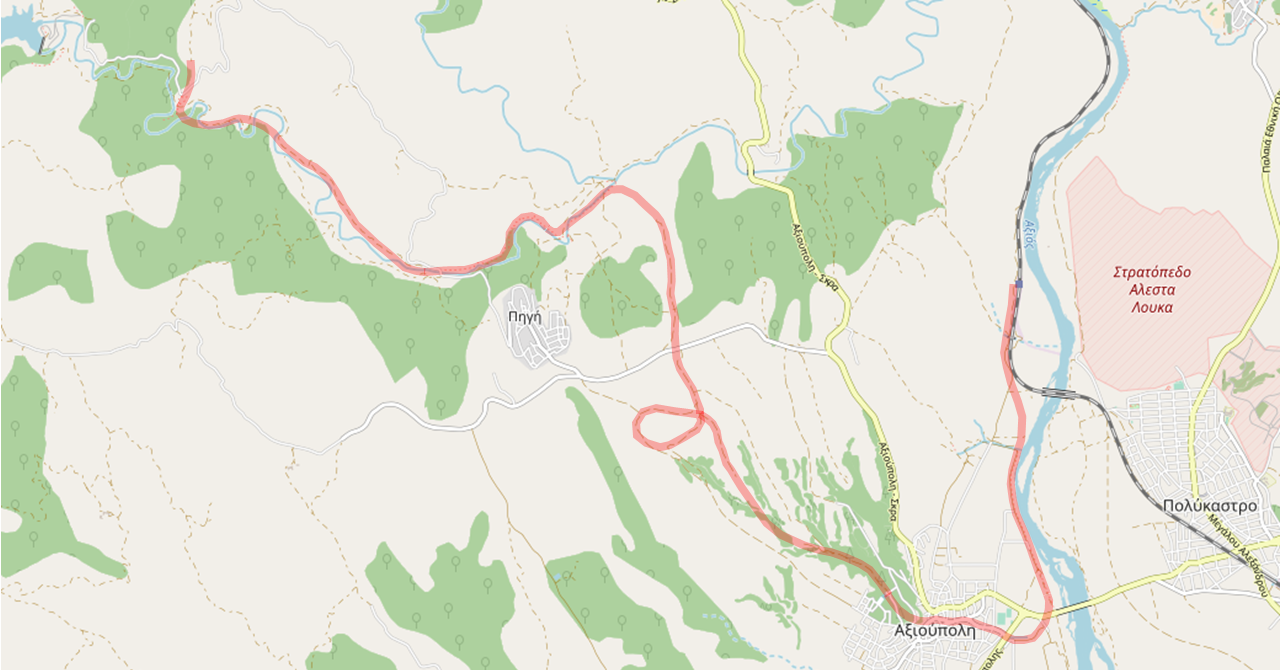
- Crossing a new-built bridge in May 1917

Technical
- Line length: 13.5 kilometres (8 mi)
- Track gauge: 600 mm (1 ft 11 5/8 in)

The Kodza Déré Decauville Railway (Greek: Κοτζά Ντερέ ντεκοβίλ) was a 13.5-kilometre-long (8 mi) narrow-gauge military railway, which was built and operated by French troops during World War I from 1917 to 1918 at Paionia near Polykastro in Makedonia.

== History ==
The valley of the Kodza Déré River was of strategic importance to the Allied Forces of World War I because the French headquarters were based near Axioupolis and a camp of the 122nd Division and military hospital was located near Pigi. The front line was just a few kilometers above on the height of the Skra-di-Legen Canyon (Greek: Σκρα ντι Λέγκεν), where the Battle of Skra-di-Legen (Greek: Μάχη του Σκρα) was fought. Similar to the nearby Battles of Doiran in 1917 and 1918 there were lengthy battles with heavy losses in the area.

== Route ==
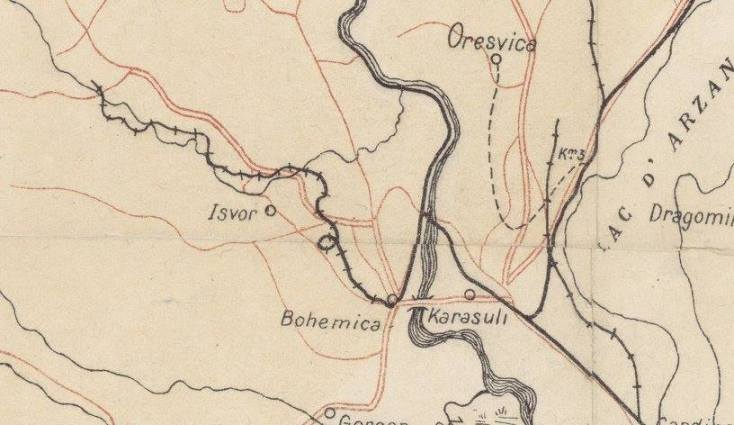
Historic map, September 1917

The Decauville railway with a gauge of 600 mm (1 ft 11 5/8 in) started from the railway station Axioupolis (Αξιούπολης). The station was known until 1927 as Goumentja. The railway crossed the town of Axioupolis, historically known as Bohemitsa (Μποέμιτσα) passing two churches and a mosque. To gain height quickly, it went through an elaborately built Vróncho Spiral (βρόγχο), to Pigi (Πηγή), then known as Isvor. From there it followed the valley of the Kodza Déré River to the terminus Black Tree (μαύρο δένδρο) below the Koúpa Mountain (Κούπα), to supply the Allied Forces at the Macedonian front with supplies and ammunition.

The track and most of the bridges were lifted after the war, but the route with its deep cuts and high embankments is partially still recognisable in the countryside.

== Gallery ==
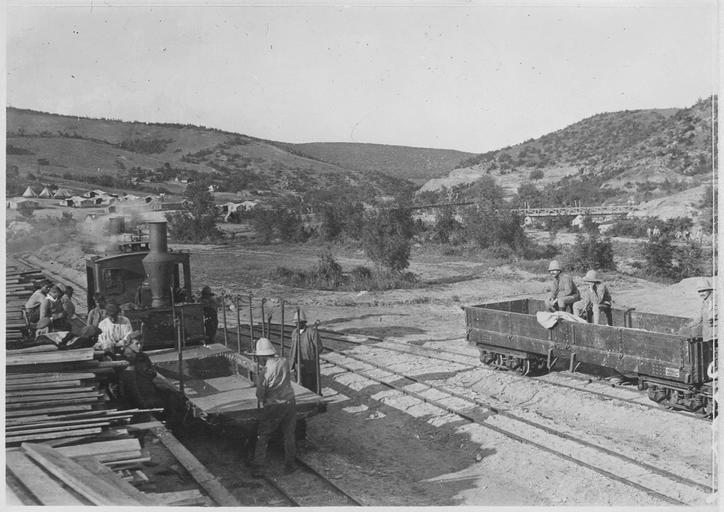
Military supplies stores on Axios River (Vardar)

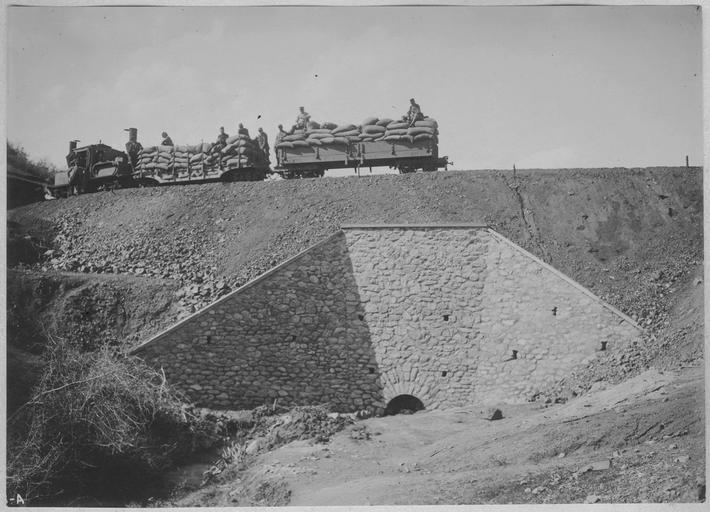
Military logistics train on a high embankment

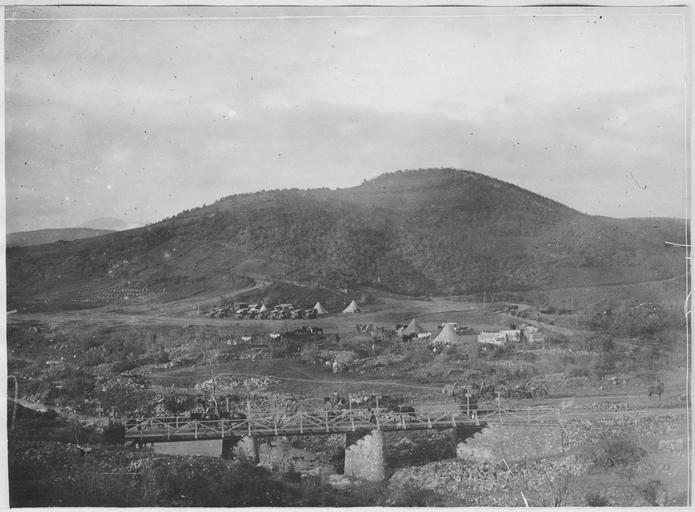
Military camp in Kodza Déré Valley

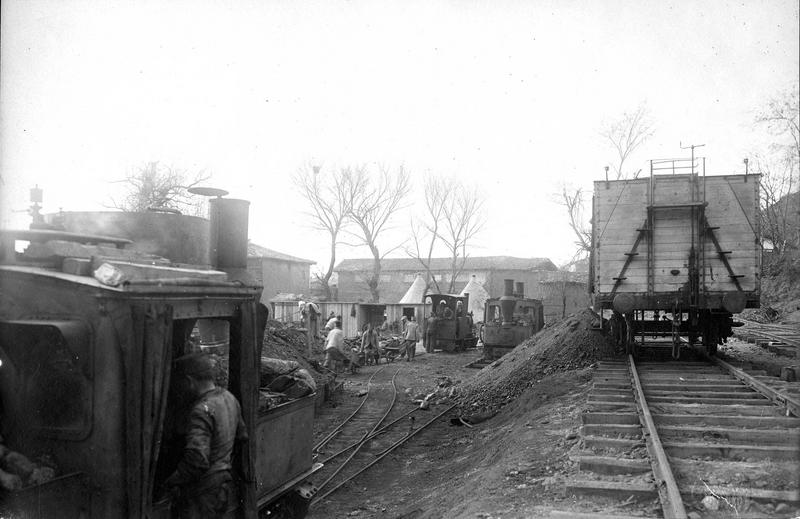
Axioupolis railway station (Goumentja)

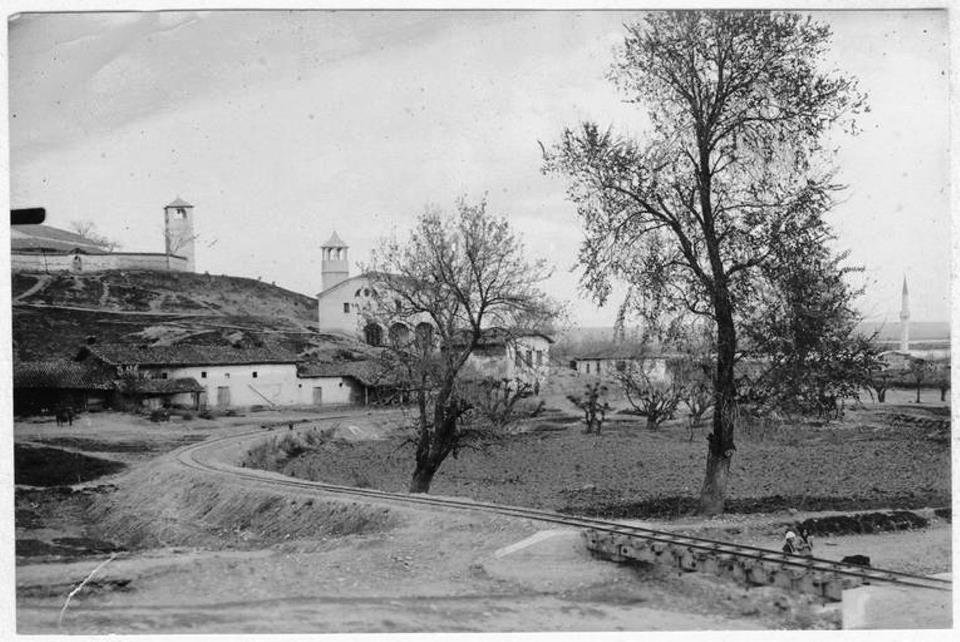
Churches and mosque of Axioupolis (Bohemitsa)

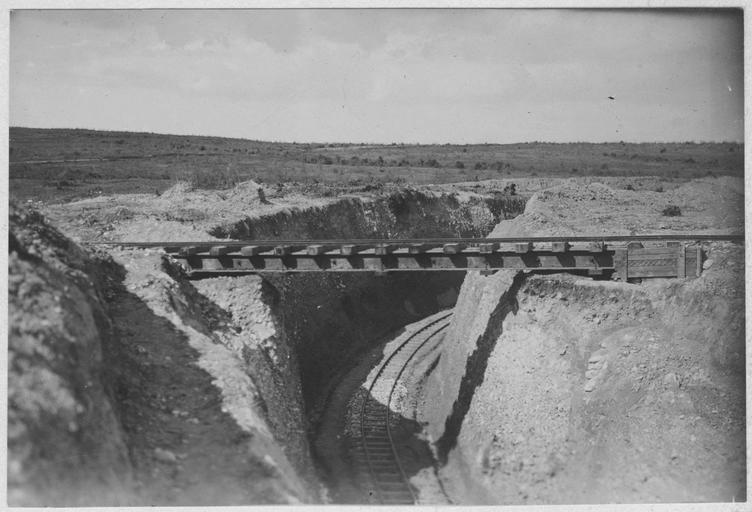
Spiral enroute to Pigi (Isvor)
