= Axioupoli =

Town in Central Macedonia, Greece

Axioupoli Αξιούπολη
- Municipal unit
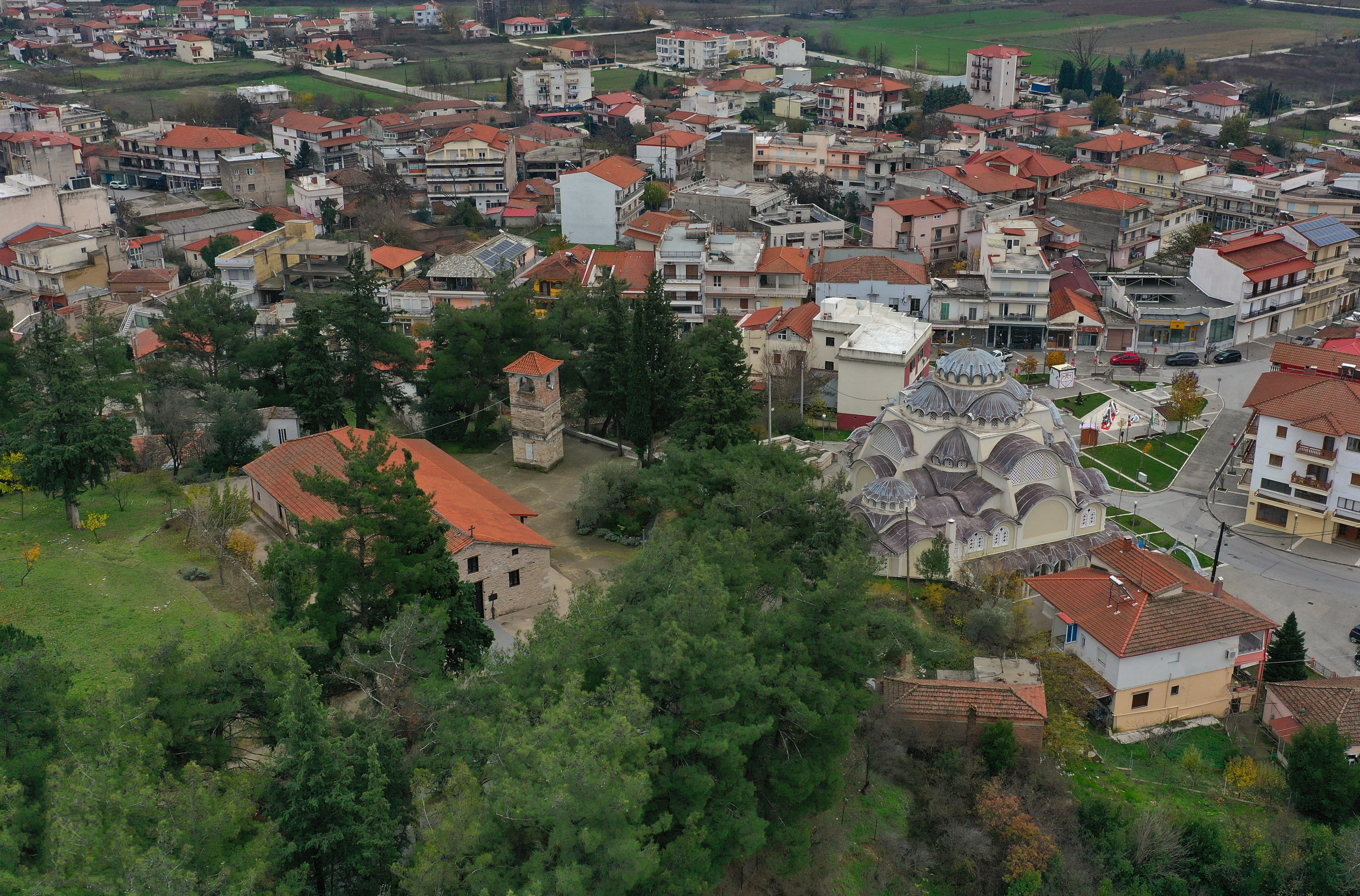

- Location within the regional unit

- Location within Greece
- Coordinates: 40°59′N 22°32′E
- Country: Greece
- Administrative region: Central Macedonia
- Regional unit: Kilkis
- Municipality: Paionia
- City established: 1760 (266 years ago)

Area
  - Municipal unit: 284.4 km^{2} (109.8 sq mi)

Population (2021)
  - Municipal unit: 4,794
  - Municipal unit density: 16.86/km^{2} (43.66/sq mi)
  - Community: 2,834
- Time zone: UTC+2 (EET)
  - Summer (DST): UTC+3 (EEST)
- Vehicle registration: ΚΙ

Axioupoli (Greek: Αξιούπολη), known until 1927 as Boymitsa (Боймица, Μποέμιτσα), is a small town and a former municipality in the former Paionia Province of Kilkis regional unit, Greek Macedonia. Since the 2011 local government reform it is part of the municipality Paionia, of which it is a municipal unit. The municipal unit has an area of 284.406 km^{2}. In 2021 the town had a population of 2,834, and the municipal unit 4,794.

== Name ==
Its ancient name was Atalanti and it was established in prehistoric times. Atalanti was conquered by Bottieans who came into the area in the 12th century BC. In the 5th century BC Atalanti was annexed in the Macedonian kingdom and by that time it followed the Greek history. The Bulgarian and Macedonian name is Boymitsa/Bojmica (Cyrillic: Боймица/Бојмица) by which the town was known until the name was changed in 1927. There have been suggestions that its former name was obtained during the era of Byzantine Empire and its transliteration means strong. Slavic tribes, who entered the area in the 7th century AD, named the area Boymitsa, which means 'little Boymia', because the valley of Axios looks like the Valley of Bohemia (although during the Ottoman era the valley of Axios River used to be called Roumlouki, meaning 'Valley of Romans'). The town was renamed Axioupoli on 1 January 1927, after the Axios River in its vicinity.

== History ==
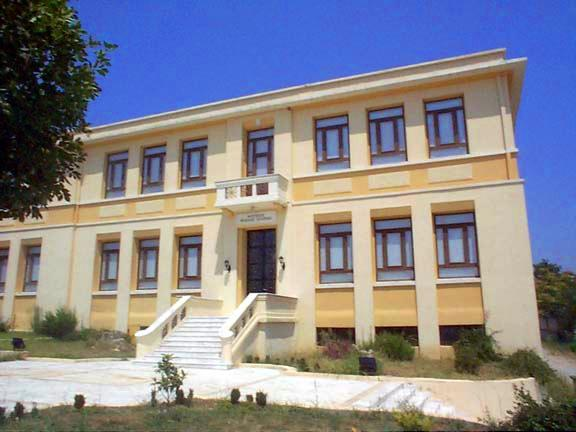
Natural history museum

Axion Estin church in Axioupoli

Refounded in 1760 by Christian settlers from adjoining areas, they chose it as their new home due to its proximity to the Axios River, near the ruins of ancient town Atalanti. The town form part of the Ottoman Empire until the early 20th century. In the Greek revolution of 1821, inhabitants of Axioupolis and other villages, fought against Ottomans. The family of Papazafiriou Stamatiadi from Idomeni gave the most famous Greek fighters of 1821. The Ottoman troops defeated the rebels in the area, and the revolution continued only in Southern Greece. Construction of Axioupolis' first church, Saint Dimitrios (Greek: Αγίου Δημητρίου), started in 1843 after Christians were given the right to build churches and schools by the Ottomans. Saint Dimitrios was completed in 1859. During the national competitions in the area, a lot of locals resisted in the Internal Macedonian Revolutionary Organization (IMRO), while others participated in the struggle led by IMRO. A committee of IMRO was founded in Boymitsa in 1896. Its leader was the local Bulgarian teacher Filip Dimitrov. Dellios Petkou Topalis killed in 1898 by Bulgarians.

The first school in town was built in 1894. People of Axioupolis Municipality participated in the Macedonian Struggle, and the main leaders of Greek efforts are mentioned below.

Macedonian fighters (Makedonomachi):

- Axioupolis: Athanasios Gertzikis (priest), Ioannis Goussidis, Vasilios Papageorgiou, Anastasios Karakechagias, Nikolaos Koulerdas, Christos Kotsidis (priest), Sofia Nikou, Dimitrios Penos
- Ryzia: Vassilios Vantsis, Christos Karamarkos,
- Skra: Dimitrios Papageorgiou, Anastasios Stavridis, Athanasios Tsempis
- Chamilo: Panagiotis Varvatis
- Idomeni: Stylianos Kovatsis Sideras, Grigorios Kokkalis, Georgios Papazafiriou Stamatiadis, Grigorios Papazafiriou Stamatiadis, Zafirios Papazafiriou Stamatiadis

The "La Macédoine et sa Population Chrétienne" survey by Dimitar Mishev (D. Brankov) from 1905 shows that the local Christian inhabitants were divided between Bulgarian Exarchate and Patriarchate of Constantinople. There were 1080 Bulgarian Exarchists and 280 supporters of Patriarchate of Constantinople. A Bulgarian and a Greek schools were functioning.

On 22 October 1912 the Ottomans were expelled and the town became part of Greece. During the population exchange of the early 20th century the town was settled by refugees from all over the Balkans and Anatolian regions, giving it a unique feel. Its residence played a big part in helping win the Battle of Kilkis-Lahanas and with the battle of Skra-di-Legen.

In 1913 the first customs office between Greece and Serbia was opened in Axioupoli. The main railway between Thessaloniki and Europe went through the town's center, making Axioupoli a center of information during the Balkan Wars, World War I and World War II.

In World War I the French Army was stationed there to control one of the main supply routes. They helped build numerous projects in town, and within the region, to help with their supply transportation. They built the Kodza Déré Decauville Railway from the center of Axioupoli to Skra, KilkisÄ and the railroad bridge which crosses over the Axios river and leads into Paris. These projects helped change the town as one of Greece's industrialized centers.

On 8 April 1944 the Germans took control of the town, which gave them access to the railroads, bridges and control over the supply routes for the Axis. They occupied the town until 31 October 1944. During the occupation, the Greek People's Liberation Army (Greek People's Liberation Army (ELAS) staged many sabotage missions against the Axis in the region while residents helped hide Greek fighters from the Germans. Because of its location it has had geopolitical significance, being one of the last places from which the Germans left after World War II ended.

== Demographics ==
Year	Population
1920	1,595
1928	1,945
1940	2,237
1951	2,738
1961	3,564
1971	3,155

== Location ==
The town is located 547 km (340 mi) north-northwest of Athens the capital of Greece; 62 km (39 mi) northwest from the regional capital Thessaloniki; 33.9 km (21.1 mi) west from the regional unit capital Kilkis, 3.5 km (2.2 mi) west from the small town of Polykastro. It is west of the Axios River.

== Sightseeing ==
To reach Axioupoli it is most possible to cross Axios River, which is mentioned on Homer's Iliad as Peones, who used to live in the area, fought in the Troy war. The Natural History Museum is one of the best in Greece, the Library, Mega Rema, the Statue of Liberty in the main square and the Metalio Lake, the big plane tree, which according to legend has been there since the era of Alexander the Great. Lastly there is the Blue Lake on mountain Paiko. It is situated between village Koupa and village of Skra, which is internationally famous for the Battle of Skra-di-Legen that took place there during the first World War, on 17 May 1917.

== Education ==
Axioupoli has a complete system of State schools including one Nursery school, two Primary, two Elementary, one Secondary and one High School. There is also a Technical school (EPAL). Apart from these you can find two Private Foreign Language Schools (Hassapi-Sidera and Sphera).

== Famous people born in the town ==
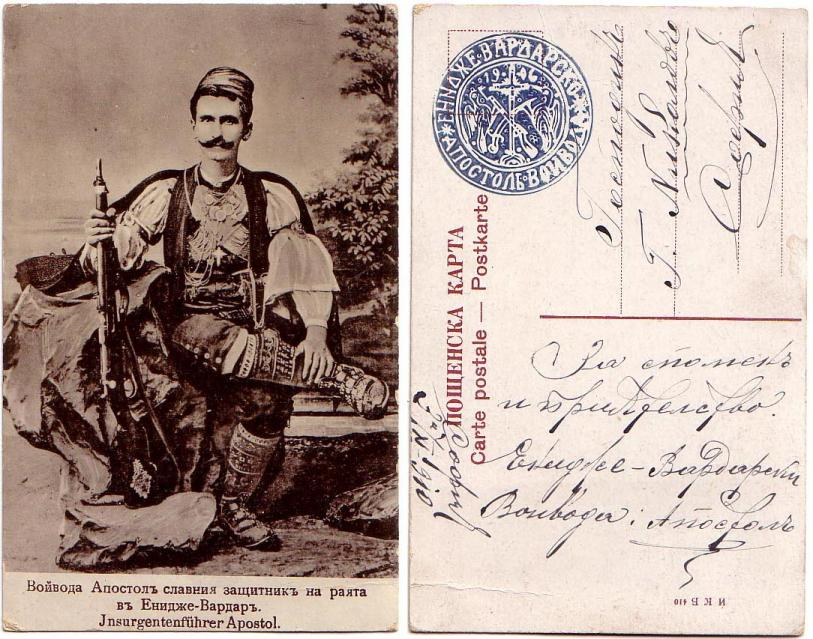
Postcard with a picture of Apostol Petkov.

- Apostol Petkov - Internal Macedonian Revolutionary Organization (IMRO) Revolutionary (1869–1911)
- Valentini Grammatikopoulou, tennis player
