= Seenu =

Seenu may refer to:

- Seenu Atoll, an administrative division of the Maldives
- Seenu, the 17th consonant of the Thaana abugaida used in Dhivehi
- Seenu (1999 film), an Indian Telugu-language film
- Seenu (2000 film), an Indian Tamil-language film starring Karthik

== See also ==
- Sinu (disambiguation)
