= Sinus =

Sinus may refer to:

== History ==
- a sac in front of body worn into a toga, in the typical style of wearing it

== Anatomy ==
- Sinus (anatomy), a sac or cavity in any organ or tissue
  - Paranasal sinuses, air cavities in the cranial bones, especially those near the nose, including:
    - Maxillary sinus, the largest of the paranasal sinuses, under the eyes, in the maxillary bones
    - Frontal sinus, superior to the eyes, in the frontal bone, which forms the hard part of the forehead
    - Ethmoid sinus, formed from several discrete air cells within the ethmoid bone between the eyes and under the nose
    - Sphenoidal sinus, in the sphenoid bone at the center of the skull base under the pituitary gland
  - Anal sinuses, the furrows which separate the columns in the rectum
  - Dural venous sinuses, venous channels found between layers of dura mater in the brain
- Sinus (botany), a space or indentation, usually on a leaf

=== Heart ===
- Sinoatrial node (sinus node), a structure in the superior part of the right atrium
- Sinus rhythm, normal beating on an ECG
- Coronary sinus, a vein collecting blood from the heart
- Sinus venosus, a cavity in the heart of embryos
- Sinus venarum, a part of the wall of the right atrium in adults, developed from the sinus venosus

== Other uses ==
- Sinus (Chalcidice), a town of ancient Chalcidice, Greece
- Sinus, gulf or bay in Latin, used in numerous toponyms in ancient writing (e.g., Sinus Magnus, Sinus Flanaticus, etc.)
- Sine, a trigonometric math function (Latin sinus)
- Sinus, an EP by The Nope (Moka Only and Psy), 2014

== See also ==
- Sinus Medii, a small lunar mare
- Sinus Successus, a lunar feature
- Sines, a municipality in Alentejo, Portugal (Latin Sinus)
- Sinusitis, a common ailment resulting in the inflammation of the paranasal sinuses
