= Battle of Spartolos =

429 BC battle of the Peloponnesian War

- Part of the Peloponnesian War
Date	429 BC
Location	Chalcidice 40.2832°N 23.2954°E
Result	Chalcidian victory

Belligerents
Athens	Chalcidian League

Commanders and leaders
Xenophon †	Unknown

Strength
2,000 infantry 200 cavalry	5,000 infantry 400 cavalry

Casualties and losses
430 dead	No more than 315 dead
- Location of the Battle of Spartolos

The Battle of Spartolos took place in 429 BC between Athens and the Chalcidian League and their allies, in the early part of the Peloponnesian War.

The fall of Potidaea had not succeeded in quelling the rebellion against Athens in Chalcidice. To ensure a steady stream of imperial revenue and suppress additional local uprisings, the Athenians dispatched Xenophon (son of Euripides) with 2,000 hoplites and 200 cavalry to launch an attack on Spartolos. They destroyed the crops outside the city and began negotiating with pro-Athenian factions in Chalcidice, but the anti-Athenian factions asked for help from Olynthus. An army from Chalcidice, Spartolos, and Olynthus met the Athenians in battle, but their hoplites were defeated and they retreated to Spartolos. Their cavalry and peltasts, however, gained the advantage over the Athenian troops. Reinforcements soon arrived from Olynthus, and they launched a second attack on the Athenians. The Athenian hoplites could not come to grips with the enemy light troops or horsemen. Eventually the Athenians panicked and were routed, with all of their generals and 430 other men killed.

In the Athenian tribute list of 429/8 BC the only cities of Chalcidice are: Mende, Aphytis, Scione, Stageira and Acanthus (Athos). Acanthus and Mende had not even joined the Chalcidian League.

== Early stage ==
When the phalanxes of the Chalcidians clashed with those of the Athenians, it was clear that the Athenians had a great advantage. The local Chalcidian hoplites made up the centre and right hand portions of the army while hired Peloponnesian forces made up the left side. The locals on the Chalcidian side gave way first, forcing the mercenaries to fall back as well. This left the Chalcidian army worn and strained, and the battle looked very promising for the Athenians.

== Later stage ==
After the Chalcidian side was worn down by the Athenians, the Chalcidians were reinforced by troops sent from Olynthus. With the help of the troops from Olynthus, the Chalcidians rallied back against the Athenians much stronger than before. They had learned that the Athenians did not have the experience or equipment to defend against large numbers of javelins, so when they came back strengthened by their allies and with a new tactic, the Chalcidians forced the Athenians to retreat. As the Athenians retreated, Chalcidian cavalry and light infantry chased down the Athenians to inflict further damage upon them. The Athenians tried multiple counter-attacks to defend themselves from further harm, but each time the Chalcidians were able to evade the attacks. The back ranks of Athenian troops began to abandon those at the front, allowing them to be overwhelmed, surrounded, and killed, including their general, Xenophon.

== Statistics ==
On the Athenian side of the battle were 2,000 hoplites, 200 cavalry, and around 500 light troops.

== Aftermath ==
Between a fifth and a fourth of the Athenian troops were killed in this battle- twice as much as was expected prior to the battle. This brutal defeat showed Athens what would be required of them to win the war.
