= Treaties between Amyntas III and the Chalcidians =

4th century BC treaties between Macedon and the Chalkidian League

One column containing two treaties between Amyntas III of Macedon and the Chalkidian League has been discovered at Olynthus (the capital of the League). The first treaty is dated in c. 393 BC, the second one before 382 BC. The language of the texts is Ionic Greek, the main dialect of Chalcidice.

== Text and translation ==
Ionic Greek original text

συνθῆκαι πρὸς Ἀμύνταν τὸν Ἐρριδαίο.
συνθῆκαι Ἀμύνται τῶι Ἐρριδαίου
καὶ Χαλκιδεῦσι· συμμάχους εἶν
ἀλλήλοισι κατὰ πάντας ἀνθρώπου[ς]
ἔτεα πεντήκοντα. ἐάν τις ἐπ’ Ἀμύνταν
ἴηι ἐς τὴν χώρην ἐπὶ πολέμοι
ἢ ἐπὶ Χαλκιδέας βοηθεῖν Χαλκιδέας
Ἀμύνται καὶ Ἀμύνταν Χαλκιδεῦσιν — —]
— —] ἐσαγωγή δ’ ἔστω καὶ πίσσης καὶ ξύλων
οκοδομιστηρίωμ πάντων, ναυπηγησίμων δὲ πλὴν ἐλατίνων
, ὅ τι ἂμ μὴ τὸ κοινὸν δέηται, τῶι δὲ κοινῶι καὶ τούτων
εἶν ἐξαγωγήν, εἰπόντας Ἀμύνται πρὶν ἐξάγειν,
τελέοντας τὰ τέλεα τὰ γεγραμμέν[α]
καὶ τῶν ἄλλων ἐξαγωγὴν δὲ εἶν καὶ διαγωγήν,
τελέουσιν τέλεα καὶ Χαλκιδεῦσι ἐκγ Μακεδονίης καί Μακεδόσιν
Χαλκιδέων. πρὸς Ἀμφιπολίτας, Βοτταίους, Ἀκανθίους, Μενδαίους
μὴ ποιεῖσθαι φιλίην Ἀμύνταμ μηδὲ Χαλκιδέας
χωρίς ἑκατέρους, ἀλλὰ μετά μιᾶς γνώμης, ἐάν ἀμφοτέροις
δοκῆι ,κοινῆι προσθέσθαι ἐκείνους. ὅρκος συμαχίης
φυλάξω τα συγκείμενα Χαλκιδεύσι και ἐάν τις ἴηι
ἐπ’ Ἀμύνταν ἐς τὴν χώρην ἐπὶ πολέμοι, βοηθήσω
Ἀμύνται [— — — — — — — — — — — — — — — — — —]

Translation

Treaties with Amyntas, son of Erridaios.
Treaties between Amyntas son of Errhidaios
and the Chalcidians· They shall be allies
with each other against all men for fifty years.
If anyone attacks the land of Amyntas
or the Chalcidians, the Chalcidians shall assist
Amyntas and Amyntas the Chalcidians— —]
— —] Importation is to be permitted of pitch and timber
for all kinds of construction and shipbuilding, except fir wood
, whatever the koinon (the Chalkidian League) does not need.
Even this (i.e. fir) the League may export,
informing Amyntas before exporting and paying the prescribed dues.
Exportation as well as transit of other (commodities) [shall be permitted]
after the payment of dues by the Chalcidians [when they export]
from Macedonia and by the Macedonians [when they export]
from Chalcidice.
With the Amphipolitans, Bottiaeans, Acanthians and Mendaeans,
they shall not make friendship, neither Amyntas nor the Chalcidians
separately, but with common consent; [and only] if both parties
decide, then they should be joined in alliance. Oath of alliance.
I shall preserve the agreements of the Chalcidians and if anyone
attacks on the land of Amyntas, I shall assist
Amyntas [— — — — — — — — — — — — — — — — — —]

== Historical background ==
After the Illyrian invasion of Macedonia in 393 BC, Amyntas was driven out and Argaeus II was installed in the throne. With the aid of the Thessalian family Aleuadae under Medius, Amyntas recovered his kingdom (Diodorus 14.92.3). To shore up his country against the threat of the Illyrians, Amyntas established an alliance with the Chalkidian League.

In 383/382 BC the Illyrians invaded again and defeated Amyntas in battle. A present of land was made to the Olynthians by Amyntas III, seeking for help. At that time the League was more powerful; not only did the alliance break down but the Chalcidians actually seized Amyntas' capital of Pella and lands of Macedon (DS 15.19.2; Isok. 6.46; cf. Hammond/Griffith 1979, 174-6). With the help of Sparta, Thessalians, Elimiotes, Iphicrates, Cotys I and city-states in Chalcidice opposing Olynthus, Amyntas recovered his kingdom and the Spartans dissolved the League in 379 BC. As Justin (7.4.6) states about Amyntas Cum Illyriis deinde et cum Olynthiis gravia bella gessit ... then he made serious wars against the Illyrians and the Olynthians.

Unlike the first treaty, the second one is clearly beneficial to the League rather than Amyntas. Not only concerning the wood exports, which are related to the aims of the maritime League for constructing an effective navy (Amyntas actually would have little interest in wood from Chalcidice or building a navy) but also the third parties mentioned, are all potential enemies of the League and not Amyntas, whose main threat was from the North, the Illyrians.

== Notes and references ==
- From the end of the Peloponnesian War to the battle of Ipsus Page 35 By Phillip Harding ISBN 0-521-29949-7 (1985)
- N. G. L. Hammond A History of Macedonia: 550-336 B.C. v. 2 - The reign of Amyntas III 393-370/69 -
