= Natural History Museum (Axioupoli) =

Museum in Axioupoli, Greece

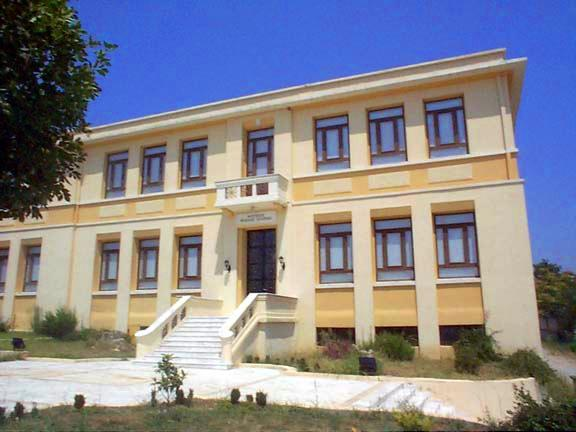
Outside view

The museum opened on 8 June 1997 as part of the cultural and tourist development of the town of Axioupoli in the Kilkis regional unit in Central Macedonia, Greece. It is housed in the town’s old primary school.

The purpose of the museum is educational. Its activities include popularising research, devising educational programs, and publishing. There is no fee for entrance.

It is divided into five sections. The first, cosmogony, starts with an analysis of the gradual creation of the star systems out of the original nebula. It continues with the Solar System, illustrating its gradual evolution and the movements of the planets. This is followed by the creation of the Earth and the geotectonic evolution of Greece’s land-mass.

The palaeontology section analyses the evolution of life on Earth, from the primitive life forms of 3,500 million years ago, blue-green algae (“Cyanophyceae”) and bacteria, to the evolution of invertebrates, plants, vertebrates, and human beings.

In the mineralogy section minerals are classified with their macroscopic picture and chemical type, and selected minerals from Greece and abroad are displayed.

The petrology section presents various types of rock categorized as pyrogenetic, sedimentary and metamorphic. The botany section, finally, has a display area and a herbarium and presents the flora of the mountains in the Kilkis area and of Greece in general, with special emphasis on rare endemic plants.

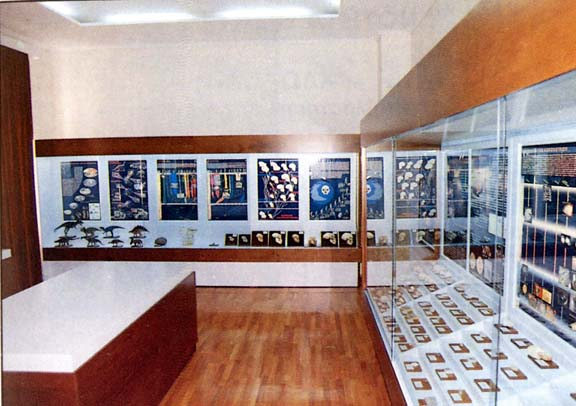
Palaeontology section

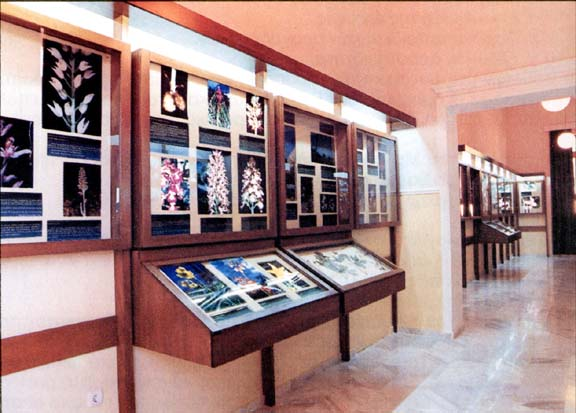
Mineralogy section

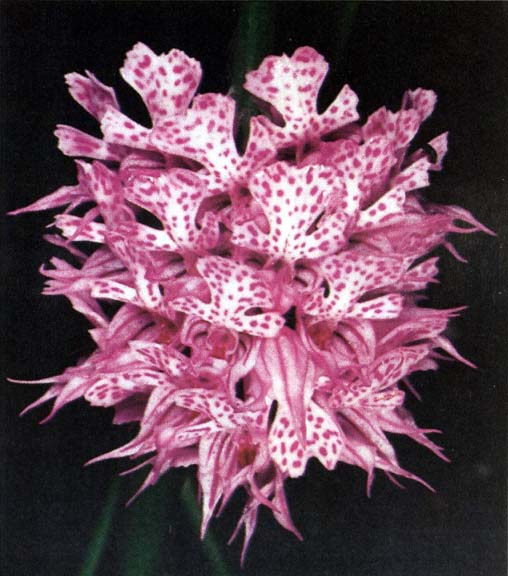
Orhis triodonticus
