= Eion (Thrace) =

Eion (Ancient Greek: Ἠϊών) was a town in ancient Thrace. It was a colony of the Mendaeans, which was betrayed to the Athenians, and retaken by the Chalcidians and Bottiaeans in 425 BCE. Eustathius placed Eion in the Chersonesus, but, as William Smith suggests that was much too remote for the Chalcidians to have marched to recover a town, Eion must have been on some point of the long and winding coast which extends from the Strymon River to the Axius River.
