= Moglenitsas =

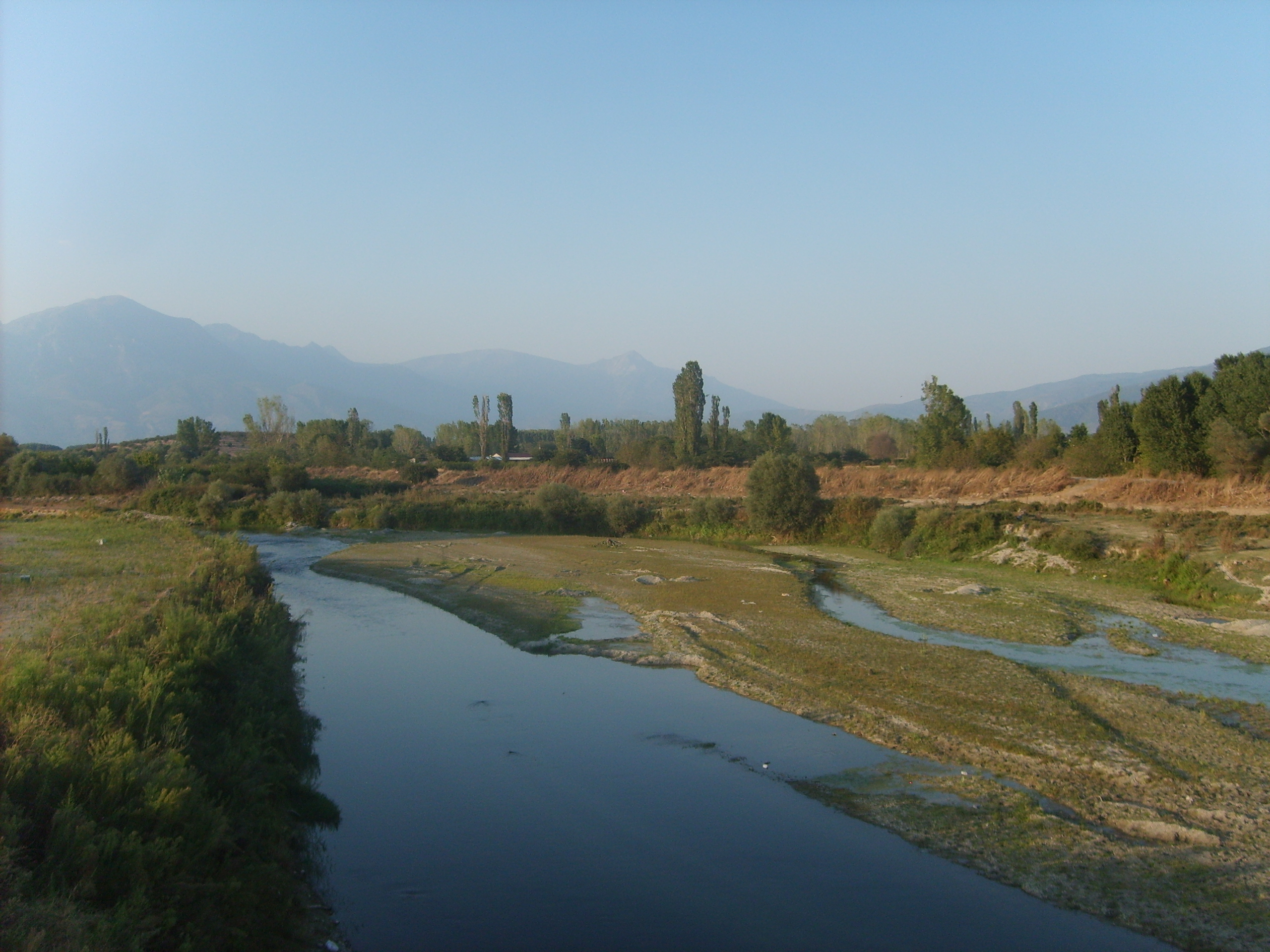
- Native name: Μογλενίτσας (Greek)

Location
- Country: Greece

Physical characteristics
- Mouth
  - location: Haliacmon
  - coordinates: 40°32′50″N 22°20′23″E

Basin features
- Progression: Haliacmon→ Aegean Sea

The Moglenitsas (Greek: Μογλενίτσας) is a river in Almopia, northern Greece. The river has its headwater in the Vermio Mountains of Macedonia, Greece and it flows into the Aliakmonas River near Kouloura, between Veria and Alexandreia, twenty kilometers west of Thessaloniki.

Tributaries of the Moglenitsas include the Xiropotamos, Toplitsas, Koziakas and Golemas rivers. As the only outflow from the region of Almopia it flows between low hills to the south, where it forms a small canyon. In the 1930s the river was redirected by use of a canal and today irrigates the region of Almopia. The river is used for sports such as rafting and kayaking and for irrigation.
