= Shino =

Shino may refer to:

== People ==
- George Shenton (footballer) (1899–1978), English footballer nicknamed Shino
- Shino Correa, a Latin musician in Grupo Aguakate
- Shino Kakinuma (柿沼 紫乃, born 1965), Japanese actress
- Shino Kunisawa (國澤 志乃, born 1991), Japanese women's professional footballer
- Shino Lin (林曉培, born 1973), Taiwanese singer and actress
- Shino Matsuda (松田 紫野, born 2001), Japanese women's professional footballer
- Shino Miyaso (宮宗 紫野, born 1988), Japanese women's professional shogi player
- Shino Mori (森 志乃, born 1989), Japanese ballet dancer
- Shino Sakuragi (桜木 紫乃, born 1965), Japanese writer
- Shino Shimoji (桜木 紫乃, born 1993), Japanese voice actress
- Shino VanHoose (born 1995), American mixed martial artist
- Shino Watabe (渡部 思乃), Japanese artist
- Shino Yamanaka (山中 詩乃, born 1990), Japanese modern pentathlete
- Shino Yanagisawa (born 1974), Japanese luger

== Fictional characters ==
- Shino (志乃), young village woman in the 1954 film Seven Samurai played by Keiko Tsushima
- Shino (Pita-ten), character from the manga and anime series Pita-Ten
- Shino Aburame, a character from the manga and anime series Naruto
- Shino, a character from the anime series .hack//Roots
- Shino, a character from the game Izuna: Legend of the Unemployed Ninja
- Shino Ebizuka, character from the Eroge visual novel and OVA Underbar Summer
- Shino Okazaki, character from the Clannad visual novel
- Shino Asada, a character from the Sword Art Online light novels

== Other things ==
- Oshnavieh or Shno, also called Shino, a town in northwestern Iran
- Shino ware, Japanese pottery
