= Shino Kunisawa =

Japanese association football player

Personal information
- Full name: Shino Kunisawa
- Date of birth: 27 April 1991 (age 35)
- Place of birth: Kochi Prefecture, Japan
- Height: 1.62 m (5 ft 4 in)
- Position: Midfielder

Team information
- Current team: Nagano Parceiro
- Number: 30

Senior career*
Years	Team	Apps	(Gls)
2019-2020	Tavagnacco	14	(1)
2020-2021	San Marino	17	(0)
2021-	Nagano Parceiro	1	(0)
- * Club domestic league appearances and goals

Shino Kunisawa (born 27 April 1991) is a Japanese professional footballer who plays as a midfielder for WE League club Nagano Parceiro.

== Club career ==
Kunisawa made her WE League debut on 12 September 2021.
