= Eion (Pieria) =

Town in ancient Pieria

Eion (Ancient Greek: Ἠϊών) was a town in ancient Pieria.

Its site is unlocated.
