= Allante (Arcadia) =

Ancient city of Arcadia

Allante (Ancient Greek: Ἀλλάντη) was a town of ancient Arcadia mentioned by Stephanus of Byzantium.

Its site is unlocated.
