= Eion (given name) =

Eion is a given name and an Irish Gaelic version of the name John. Notable people with the name include:

- Eion Bailey, American actor
- Eion Crossan, New Zealand rugby player
- Eion Katchay, Guyanese-born cricket player
- Eion Scarrow, New Zealand gardening promoter
