= Sinus (Chalcidice) =

Coordinates: 40°17′29″N 23°13′26″E

Sinus or Sinos (Ancient Greek: Σίνος) was a town of the Chalcidice in ancient Macedonia. It belonged to the Delian League since it appears in the tribute records of Athens of 434/3 and 433/2 BCE, where it paid a phoros of 1500 drachmas, and in those of 421/0 BCE where it paid 800 drachmas. It also appears in a tributary decree of 422/1 BCE. Its territory was probably the Sinea found in an inscription dated to 305-297 BCE.

Its site is in northwestern Chalcidice.
