= Thamiscus =

Thamiscus or Thamiskos (Ancient Greek: Θαμίσκος) was a town of the Chalcidice, in ancient Macedonia. In the year 323 BCE, it was one of the cities delivered by Alexander the Great to the Macedonians. Its site is unlocated.
