= Bottike =

Historical region in Chalkidiki, Greece

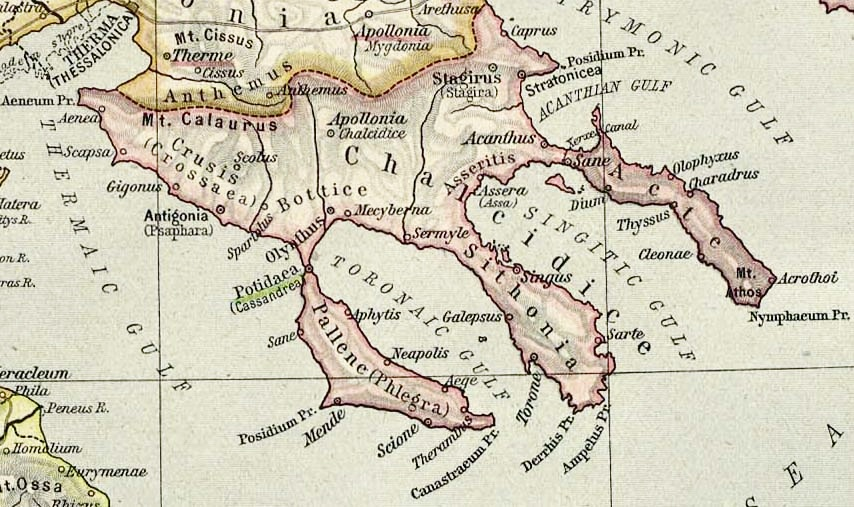
Bottice in West Chalcidice

Bottike or Bottice (Greek: Βοττική) was a western region of ancient Chalcidice, inhabited by the Bottiaeans, who were expelled from their homeland Bottiaea by Macedonians sometime in the Archaic period. Their chief polis was Spartolos. Bottiaeans were members and allies of the Delian League. In 432 they revolted from Athens, along with the Chalkidian League, but in 422 they entered in an alliance with the Athenians. It seems from the inscriptions that they had formed a confederacy (koinon) and struck silver and bronze coins. There were between six and twelve Bottiaean cities, but not all of them were inside Bottike. According to Herodotus (8.127) Olynthus, close to Bottike, was originally a Bottiaean community.

Bottike is mentioned by Thucydides and Xenophon in the battles taken place in Chalcidice between late 5th and early 4th century BC. Bottikois, which means for Bottic ones) is only mentioned in epigraphy. After the conquest by Philip II, unlike Bottiaea, the name of Bottike disappeared.
