= Thraco-Macedonian =

Thraco-Macedonian is a conventional name in the study of ancient history to describe the political geography of parts of the region of Macedonia in antiquity. It may refer to:

- Thraco-Macedonian region. Usually it comprises the geographical region of eastern Greek Macedonia (modern Serres, Kavala, Drama regional units) and the Blagoevgrad province, corresponding to the ancient regions of Bisaltia, Odomantike, Sintike, Edonis and Maedike. It may also include ancient regions of central Macedonia, also known as Thrace in antiquity (between Homeric geography and 4th century BC); Chalcidice, Mygdonia and Pieria. As an example, even the Late Roman era writer Stephanus places Methone of Pieria and Torone of Chalcidice, in Thrace.
- Thraco-Macedonian coins or Thraco-Macedonian standard. Ancient coins of Thracian tribes (or tribes who have been labelled as Thracian) in Macedonia, like those of Bergaios and Derrones. The earliest coins date in the 6th century BC from the mine district of Pangaion Hills. In style and types they bear a resemblance to another series of coins conjecturally assigned to Thasos. Thraco-Macedonian may also include types of coins from Greek city-states in the coastal region. Later when the whole region was annexed to the Macedonian kingdom, some coins of cities and tribes continued to be minted and circulated. So an appropriate and clarifying term for coins minted by the kingdom is 'Macedonian royal coinage'.

== See also ==
- Thracian phoros
- Western Thrace
- Macedonia and Thrace
