= Chalcidian League =

Greek state on the Chalcidice peninsula (430 BC-348 BC)

Coordinates: 40.5°N 23.2°E

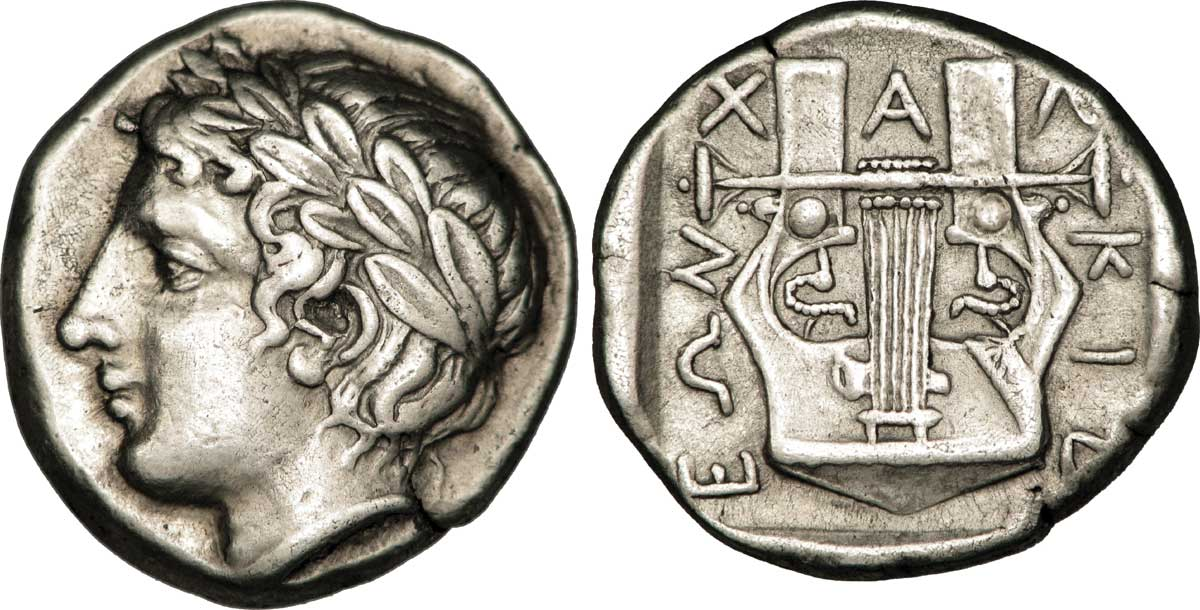
Coin minted by the Chalcidian League, depicting Apollo and a lyre with the Greek inscription ΧΑΛΚΙΔΕΩΝ, which means "of the Chalcidians"

The Chalcidian League (Greek: Κοινόν τῶν Χαλκιδέων, Koinon tōn Chalkideōn, "League of the Chalcidians"), also referred to as the Olynthians or the Chalcidians in Thrace (Χαλκιδεῖς ἐπί Θρᾴκης, Chalkideis epi Thrakēs) to distinguish them from the Chalcidians in Euboea, was a federal state that existed on the Halkidiki peninsula, on the shores of the northwest Aegean Sea, from around 430 BCE until Olynthus was destroyed and the peninsula was annexed by Philip II into Macedon, in 348 BCE.

== Origins ==
There are two theories on the origins of the Chalcidians:

- as argued by E. Harrison (1912), the Chalcidians were a northern Greek tribe.
- as argued by Donald W. Bradeen (1952), the Chalcidians were Corinthian colonists from southern Greece.

Harrison's theory has been rejected by some historians such as Bradeen (1952) but has been adopted by other historians, such as U. Kahrsted (1953) and M. Zahrnt (1971). N. G. L. Hammond (1992) notes the uncertainty about the tribe's origins but concludes that, at least, "The discovery that there was Submycenaean, Protogeometric, and Geometric pottery in Chalcidice like that of southern Greece, and sometimes having connections with Lefkandi, makes it certain that Chalcidice and southern Greece were in contact with one another".

== History ==
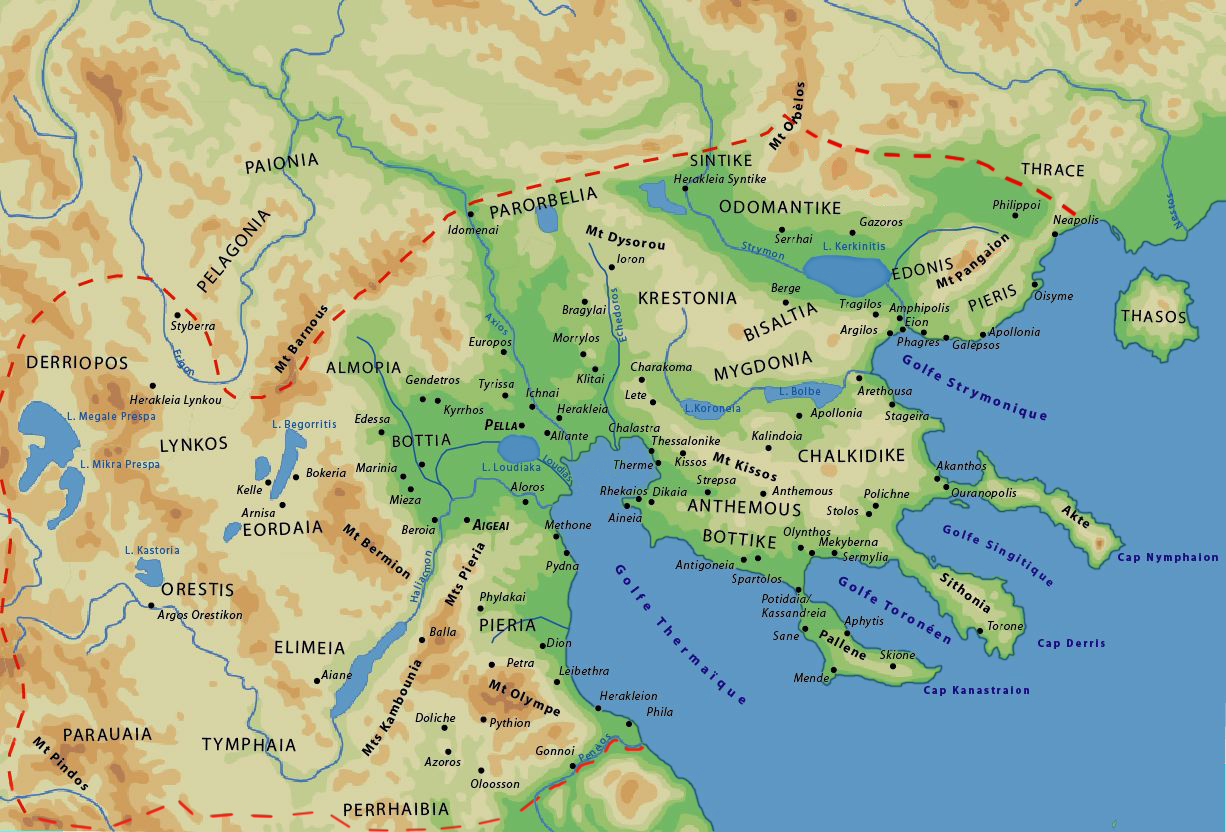
Macedonia and the Chalcidice

In the spring of 432 BCE, during the first phase of the Peloponnesian War, several cities of Chalcidice broke away from the Athenian-dominated Delian League. The inhabitants of these cities abandoned them and moved to Olynthos in an act of synoecism, forming a single state and adopting the demonym "Chalcidians". Exactly what form it took is a matter of academic dispute. By the terms of the Peace of Nicias of 421 BCE, Athens and Sparta agreed that it should be broken up, but it seems clear that Athens failed to enforce this. Luckily for the Chalcidians, the attention of the two great powers was soon diverted away from them—indeed for this reason nothing is heard of Olynthos and the Chalcidians until 393/2 BCE — and the Spartan governors installed by Brasidas were soon withdrawn.

In the aftermath of the Peace of Nicias, the city-states of Argilus, Akanthos, and Stageira, as well as other unnamed ones, joined. The League continued to expand in the early 4th century BCE. In 393/2 BCE, Amyntas III of Macedon temporarily transferred some territory to Olynthos, during a period when he was driven out of Macedon by the Illyrians. It was restored when Amyntas regained power. Eight years later, Amyntas, who was again in trouble, handed over territory, this time to the entire League. The League were not so ready to return what they held, which now included Pella, the Macedonian capital. In 383 BCE, Amyntas appealed to Sparta and at the same time a similar appeal came from Akanthos and Apollonia, two League members who claimed that membership of the League was not voluntary but had been forced upon them at the point of the sword. Sparta was keen to respond to the request. Among Sparta's allies there was no animosity against the Chalcidian League. Nevertheless, when the question was put, fear of annoying Sparta ensured that the proposal was carried, and a force of 10,000 was authorized to be sent. An advance force of 2,000 was sent under Eudamidas which succeeded in separating Potidaea from the League.

The fighting was long and arduous. Teleutias, the half-brother of the Spartan king, Agesilaus II, was killed and King Agesipolis suffered heavy losses before dying of fever. However, in 379 BCE the cities of the former League became "autonomous" and subject allies of Sparta. Freeman regards the Spartan dissolution of the League as one of the most "calamitous events" in Hellenic history for, in his view, the League uniting the northern Greek cities with the most Hellenised cities of Macedonia would have prevented the rise of Philip II of Macedon.

Already in 375 BCE the Chalcidians threw off Spartan control and re-established the League, joining the Second Athenian League. They soon fell out with Athens over control of Amphipolis, and in the subsequent war lost a number of cities, including Torone and Potidaea. As a result the Chalcidians allied themselves with Philip II of Macedon, and the League once again expanded to include 34 cities, but in 348 BCE Philip captured and destroyed Olynthos, putting an end to the League.

== Internal organization ==
The actual form of the League is uncertain. It seems it was a genuinely federal state (sympoliteia), although Olynthos played the dominant role. The League had a federal citizenship, common laws, foreign policy, coinage, and military. There was a citizen assembly that also had judicial functions. The League was apparently headed by an eponymous official, possibly a strategos. Its constitution was probably based on the Boeotian League. Political rights are likely to have been reserved to a group of 8000 designated by a property qualification. It included most but not all the Euboean colonies of Chalcidice. The symbol of the Chalcidians was the lyre, struck upon the coins the League.

== See also ==
- Chalkidiki
- Treaties between Amyntas III and the Chalcidians

== Sources ==
- Bakhuizen, Simon C.; Kreulen, R. (1976). Chalcis-in-Euboea: Iron and Chalcidians Abroad. Leiden: Brill Archive. ISBN 9789004045460.
- Cartledge, Paul (1987). Agesilaos and the Crisis of Sparta. Duckworth. ISBN 9780715620823.
- Schwahn, Walther (1931). "Sympoliteia". Realencyclopädie der Classischen Altertumswissenschaft (in German). Vol. Band IV, Halbband 7, Stoa–Symposion. col. 1171–1266.
