= Bottiaea =

Historical region in Imathia, Macedonia, Greece

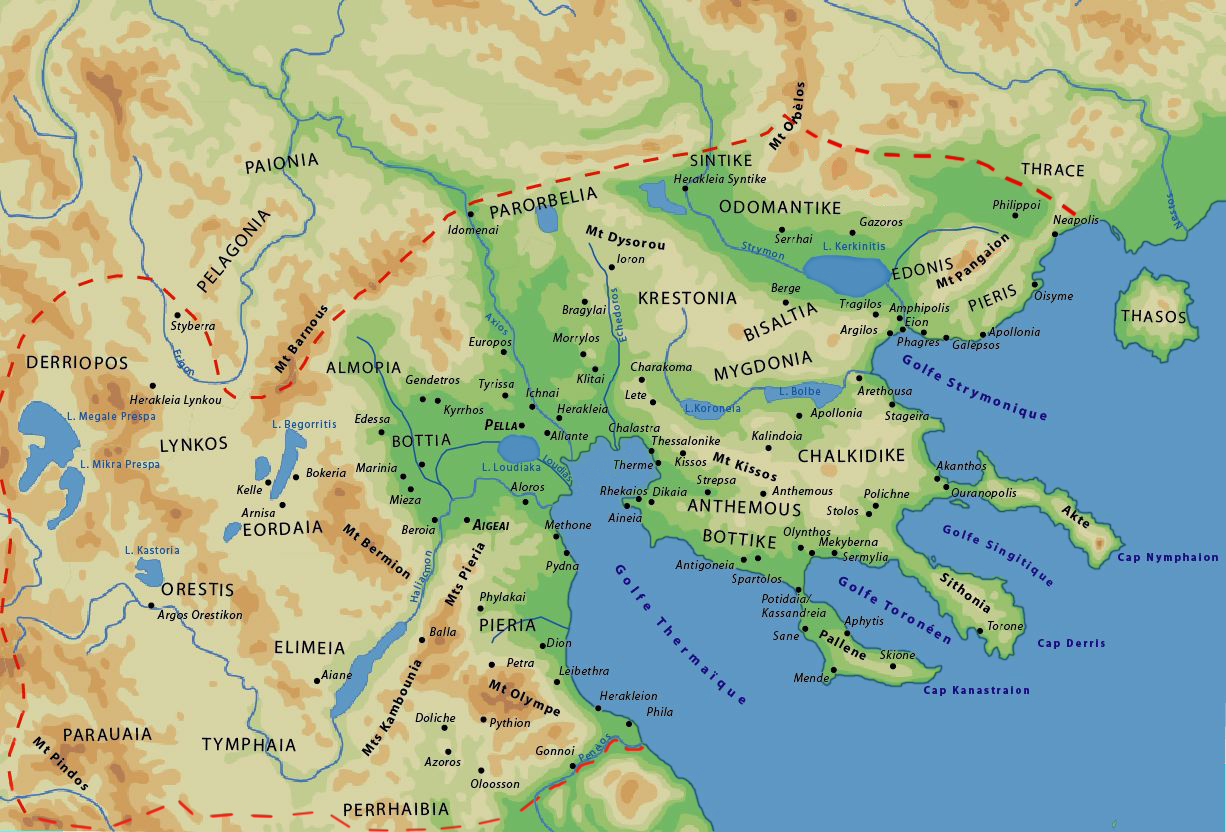
Map of the Kingdom of Macedon with Bottiaea (Bottia) located in the central districts of the kingdom. The Bottiaeans migrated to Bottike in Western Chalkidiki.

Bottiaea (Greek: Βοττιαία Bottiaia) was a geographical region of Lower Macedonia and an administrative district of the Macedonian Kingdom. It was previously inhabited by the Bottiaeans, a people of uncertain origin, later expelled by the Makedones into Bottike (Chalcidice). In Roman times it was replaced by Emathia as a geographical term.

== Geography ==
Bottiaea comprised the northeastern part of Imathia and the area between the Loudias and the Axios Rivers (the western area of today's Giannitsa) in modern Pella (regional unit).

== Towns ==
The historic cities of Bottiaea were Aegae (modern Vergina) first capital of Macedon, Aloros, Pella (second capital of Macedon), Edessa, Mieza, Atalanta, Gortynia, Kyrros, Skydra, Ichnae and Beroea.
