= Phoros =

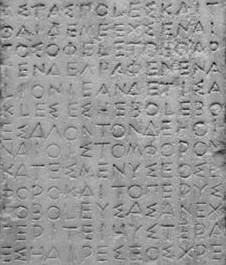

In Ancient Greece, phoros (Greek: φόρος) was the name for the membership dues paid to Athens by the members of the Delian League, formed to offer protection from Persian forces. It could be paid in military equipment (such as triremes) or money, most usually the latter. Consequently, a great deal of funds was paid to Athens for the purpose of military initiatives. Athens increased its military forces, resulting in its becoming a dominant and wealthy power.

== Background ==
After the Persian Wars, the Delian League was formed as a mutual-defense pact and it was based on the sacred island of Delos during its first 25 years of existence. While no major conflict occurred, there existed a form of cold war between Greece and Persia punctuated by incidents such as diplomatic moves and countermoves, threats, and raids, particularly along the border that separated the territories of the two powers. At its peak, membership swelled to about 200 and, in exchange for Athenian protection, each paid phoros in talents of silver while the more powerful members such as Samos, Chios, and Lesbos supplied warships as their tribute. The list of annual tributes were preserved as inscriptions in the marbles of the Athenian Acropolis. According to Aristotle, the very first phoros ("that which is brought") was assessed by Aristeides a couple of years after the battle of Salamis.

The phoros became a source of contention when it was doubled and trebled by the Athenians to finance the Peloponnesian War.

In 454/3, the Delian League treasury was moved to Athens for safe-keeping after the League's defeat in Egypt, although some sources cited it as a pretext on the part of the Athenians to gain control of the league's finances. Failure to pay the phoros often prompted swift enforcement measures such as the case of Delos, which had to contend with an Athenian military action after it withheld its phoros due to discontent with the city state.
