= Members of the Delian League =

The Delian League before the Peloponnesian War, in 431 BC.

The members of the Delian League/Athenian Empire (c. 478–404 BC) can be categorized into two groups: the allied states (symmachoi) reported in the stone tablets of the Athenian tribute lists (454–409 BC), who contributed the symmachikos phoros ("allied tax") in money, and further allies, reported either in epigraphy or historiography, whose contribution consisted of ships, wood, grain, and military assistance; proper and occasional members, subject members and genuine allies.

== Analysis ==
The study of the symmachikos phoros provides the following insights: The amount of tax paid by each state is written in Attic numerals. One-sixtieth is dedicated to Athena, the patron goddess of the city. The membership is not limited to Ionians or Greek city-states (see Ialysus, Mysians, Eteocarpathians and the Carians whom Tymnes rules). Allied states of Western Greece are not categorized under a fiscal district the Thracian, Hellespontine, Insular, Carian and Ionian phoros of the eastern states; somehow comparable districts to the former Achaemenid satrapies of Skudra, Hellespontine Phrygia, the Yaunâ on this side of the sea, Karka, and the Yaûna across the sea. The categorization of members under these fiscal districts appeared first in the list of 443/2 BC. After 438 BC, the Carian phoros became part of the Ionian district and after c. 425 BC a new Aktaios phoros, comprising the coastal Troad, was created out of the Hellespontine district. During the Sicilian Expedition a fragmentary list suggests that the Athenian state had created a Magna Graecian district. The following names are readable: Naxians, Catanians, Sicels, Rhegians. The only references until now on the Pontic phoros are the list of 425/4 BC and 410/09 BC.

Paradoxically, although the modern current term for the alliance is "Delian League", inscriptions have not yet been found on the island related to the League, and the information about the transfer of the treasure comes from the chronologization of the first Attic tribute list in 454 BC and not by Thucydides, who just informs about the treasure and the center of the Athenian power/alliance being on Delos (Thuc. I.96.97). The first inscription which records the Athenians and allies comes from Delphi, dating to c. 475 BC, is fragmentary, and the names of the allies are not readable or not mentioned. There is an epigraphical gap between 475 and 454 BC, although the phrase Athenians and allies is always present in historiography (Thuc. 1. 109, campaign in Egypt).

The exact location of several inscribed cities is still debated. Athenian cleruchies and colonies like Amphipolis are considered part of the Athenian state and not members of the League.

== Fiscal districts (443-409 BC) ==
=== Insular phoros ===
Nesiotikos phoros (Νησιωτικὸς φόρος)

- Aegina

==== Euboea ====
- Athenae Diades
- Carystus
- Chalcis
- Diakrioi in Chalcis
- Eretria
- Poseideion Ποσίδεον
- Styra

==== Cyclades ====
- Anaphe
- Andros
- Belbina
- Melos
- Naxos
- Ios
- Keos
- Keria Keros?
- Kimolos
- Kythnos
- Mykonos
- Paros
- Pholegandros
- Rineia
- Seriphos
- Sifnos
- Sikinos
- Syros
- Tenos
- Thera

==== North Aegean ====
- Hephaestia, Lemnos
- Imbros
- Myrina, Lemnos

==== Unknown region ====
- Grynches

=== Ionian phoros ===
- Ionikos phoros (Ἰωνικὸς φόρος)
- Astyrenoi Mysoi in 444/443 and 438/437

==== Islands ====
- Amorgioi on Amorgos
- Chios 425/4 BC (before the fiscal districts in 454/3, 448/7 and 447/6)
- Nisyrioi on Nisyros
- Oinaioi of Oine on Icaria
- Thermaioi of Thermai on Icaria

==== Aeolis ====
- Cyme
- Myrina
- Pitane

==== Ionia ====
- Clazomenae
- Colophon
- Ephesus
- Erythrae
- Kyrbissos
- Lebedus
- Maiandrioi
- Miletus
- Pygeles
- Myesos or Myessos
- Notion
- Phocaea
- Polichnitai
- Priene
- Teos

==== Unknown region (of Ionian or Carian phoros) ====
- Airaies
- Amynandes
- Bolbae
- Boutheia
- Chalkeatai
- Cheronnesioi
- Diosiritai
- Edries Messes
- Erines
- Gargares
- Heraioi
- Hiera para Sidymeas
- Hyblisses
- Idymes
- Isindioi
- Karbasyandes
- Karyes para Idyma (city)
- Kasolabes
- Klaundes
- Killares, whom [...] rules
- Kindyes, whom [...] rules
- Kodapes
- Koioi
- Krosa or Crusa
- Kyromes
- Lepsimandes
- Marathesioi
- Oranietai
- Pactyes Idymeus ruler
- Pasandes
- Pladases
- Pteleosioi
- Sidosioi
- Taramptos
- Tarbanes
- Teichiossa

=== Carian phoros ===
Karikos phoros (Καρικὸς φόρος)

==== Caria and Doris ====
- Alinda
- Amynandeis
- Auliatai Carians
- Carians, whom Tymnes rules
- Caryanda
- Chalketores
- Halicarnassus
- Kaunians
- Kedriatai
- Knidos
- Kryes
- Latmus
- Myndus
- Myndus in Termera
- Pedassus
- Sambaktys Carian ruler
- Syagella, which Pikres in Attic (Carian Pigres) rules
- Termeres

==== Dodecanese ====
- Astypalaia
- Brykountioi of Karpathos
- Eteocarpathians
- Ialysos
- Kalyndos or Kalynda (Kalymnos)
- Kameiros
- Leros
- Lindos
- Pedies, Lindos
- Sarioi
- Syme
- Telos

==== Lycia ====
- Kyllandios
- Phaselis
- Telandros
- Telmessos
- Tymnessus

==== Lycaonia ====
- Milyae tribe

==== Pamphylia ====
- Aspendos
- Perga
- Sillyon

==== Cilicia ====
- Ityra
- Kelenderis

=== Thracian phoros ===
Thrakios phoros (Θράκιος φόρος)

==== Pieria ====
- Heraclion
- Methone

==== Mygdonia ====
- Aeneia
- Bormiscus
- Dicaea
- Kalindoia

==== Chalcidice ====
- Acanthus (Athos)
- Aphytis
- Dion (Athos)
- Gale
- Mekyberna
- Mende
- Neapolis. colony of the Mendaeans
- Olophyxus
- Olynthus
- Phegetioi, exact location in Chalcidice unknown
- Polichnitai, near Stolos
- Potidaea
- Sane
- Scione
- Sermylia
- Spartolos
- Stolos
- Strepsa
- Torone
- Tragilus

==== East Macedonia ====
- Argilus
- Bergaioi
- Neapolis
- Thasos

==== Thrace proper ====
- Abdera
- Aenus
- Methone
- Samothrace

==== Sporades ====
- Ikos city on Alonissos island
- Peparethos
- Skiathos

==== Unknown region ====
- Asseritai
- Chedrolioi
- Haisa
- Galaia
- Kossaioi
- Miltorioi
- Othorioi
- Pharbelioi
- Pieres at Pergamon
- Pergamoteichitai
- Sermaies
- Singeion
- Skablaioi
- Smilla Gigonos
- Thyssioi
- Tinda

=== Hellespontine phoros ===
Hellespontios phoros (Ἑλλησπόντιος φόρος)

==== Islands ====
- Bysbikos modern İmralı
- Proconnesus
- Tenedos

==== Thrace ====
- Bisanthe
- Byzantium
- Didymoteichitai
- Perinthus
- Selymbra
- Tyrodiza

==== Thracian Chersonese ====
- Abydos
- Alopeconnesus
- Elaeus
- Kallipolis
- Sestus

==== Asia Minor ====
- Artake
- Astyra Troika
- Berysioi of the city Birytis
- Cyzicus
- Chalcedon
- Dardaneis
- Dareion (Mysia)
- Daskyleion
- Lampsacus
- Madytus
- Mysians
- Parianoi, citizens of Parion
- Priapos
- Pythopolis
- Sigeion
- Zeleia

==== Unknown region ====
- Arisbaioi
- Artaioteichitai
- Azeies
- Brylleianoi
- Daunioteichitai
- Gentinioi
- Halonesioi
- Harpagianoi
- Kebrenioi (Kebrene, in Troad region)
- Kianoi
- Kolones
- Lamponeies
- Limnaioi
- Metropolis (Anatolia) ?
- Neandreies
- Neapolis (in Western-Macedonia prefecture)?
- Otlenoi
- Paisenoi
- Palaiperkosioi
- Perkosioi of the city Perkote
- Serioteichitai
- Skapsioi
- Sombia
- Teria para Brylleion

===== Aktaiai Poleis =====
The cities of the Aktaios phoros (Ἀκταῖος φόρος), the coastal Troad, separated from the Hellespontine district in 427 BC following the Mytilenaean revolt and first appearing in the tribute lists of 425/4 BC.

- Achilleion
- Hamaxitus
- Antandros
- Kolonai
- Larisa
- Nesos
- Ophryneion
- Palamedeion
- Rhoiteion
- Pordoselene
- Petra
- Thymbra

=== Pontic phoros (Black Sea) ===
Pontikos phoros (Ποντικός φόρος)

- Apollonia Pontice Thrace
- Dandakes
- Heraclea Bithynia
- Karkinitis (Kerkinitis Crimea)
- Karosa
- Kerasus
- Kimmeria (Kimmerikon Crimea)
- Mesembria
- Nikonia on Tyras River (now Dniester)
- Niphsa
- Nymphaion (Crimea) 410/9 BC
- Olbia
- Patrasys
- Tamyrake
- Tyras by Dniester

== Other allies ==
Aegean

- Mytilene
- Rhodes
- Samos

Cyprus

- Evagoras I king c.410 BC

Egypt

- Inaros rebel c.460 BC

Ionian Islands

- Corcyra (source Thucydides Kerkyraika)
- Zacynthus
- Cephallenia
- Leucas

West central Greece

- Acarnanians
- Locrians

Macedonia

- Perdiccas II of Macedon, Antiochos of Orestis, Arrhabaios of Lynkestis (kings, symmachoi) 417-413 BC?
- Archelaus I of Macedon Archelas supplies wood to Athens and takes the titles of proxenos and euergetes 407/6 BC

Magna Graecia

- Catana (See also Sicilian Expedition)
- Elymians and Segesta 433/2 BC
- Leontini 433/2
- Rhegium c.433/2 BC

Peloponnese

- Argives, Mantineians and Eleans 420 BC
