= Rhoiteion =

Ancient Greek city in Anatolia

- Ῥοίτειον (Ancient Greek)
- Location within Turkey
- 40°0′33″N 26°18′0″E
- Type: Settlement
- Location: İntepe, Çanakkale Province, Turkey
- Region: Troad

History
- Built: Late 8th century BC at the latest

Rhoiteion (Ancient Greek: Ῥοίτειον, romanized: Rhoiteion, Latin: Rhoeteum) was an ancient Greek city in the northern Troad region of Anatolia, also known as Ῥοίτιον ἄκρον. Its territory was bounded to the south and west by the Simoeis river and to the east by Ophryneion. It was located on the Baba Kale spur of Çakal Tepe north of Halileli and west of İntepe (previously known as Erenköy) in Çanakkale Province, Turkey.

== Foundation ==
According to the Greek geographer Strabo of the Augustan era, Rhoiteion was founded by Astypalaians at some point following the fall of Troy. A scholion on the text of Apollonius of Rhodes explained the origin of the name as referring to Rhoiteia, daughter of Proteus, but scholars consider this etymology to be spurious. Surface surveys conducted in 1959 and 1968 suggest that the site was occupied by Greeks from at least the late 8th century BC.

== History ==
The earliest source to mention Rhoiteion is the 5th century BC historian Herodotus who mentions it as one of the cities Xerxes marches past with the Persian army on his way to Greece in 480 BC. At a similar period to when Herodotus was writing, the Mytilenaean logographer Hellanicus referred to Rhoiteion's history in Book 1 of his Τρωϊκά (Troika, a history of Troy), stating that following the sack of Ilium, Rhoiteion and nearby Sigeion had divided the fallen city's territory between them. Rhoiteion was one of the Actaean cities which Mytilene lost control of following the end of the Mytilenean revolt in 427 BC. In spring 424 BC, the exiles from Mytilene seized Rhoiteion, but returned control of it to Athens when they were paid a ransom of 2,000 Phokaian staters.

Rhoiteion's greatest asset was the suitability of its coast for harbouring ships and its location on the Hellespont which connected the Black Sea to the Aegean Sea vis the Sea of Marmara; when it appears in the sources, it is usually for this reason. Famously, its coast was where the Achaeans beached their ships. The Peloponnesian fleet put in here in the summer of 411 BC, and in 409 BC the Athenian fleet beached along these shores, sheltering from the winter storms. The promontory of Aeantion in the west of Rhoiteion's territory was commonly used as a harbour in Roman times: in Philostratus' Life of Apollonius of Tyana, written in the late 2nd century AD, Apollonius finds many ships at anchor here and takes passage on one, and in AD 324 the fleet of Licinius spent the night at anchor here before going into battle against Crispus. In modern times, locals have referred to most of the bays along this coast at one time or another as Karanlık Limanı (Turkish ‘concealed harbour’).

Outside myth (see below on The Tomb of Ajax), Rhoeteion is rarely mentioned after the Classical period. In 335 BC, prior to Alexander the Great's victory at the nearby Granicus river, one of his commanders, Calas, was beaten back by the Persians and forced to take temporary refuge at Rhoiteion. In the 3rd century BC, a Μοιρίας Ἀντιφάνου Ῥοιτεύς ('Moirias the son of Antiphanes, citizen of Rhoiteion') is honoured as a proxenos in an inscription from Delos. In 190 BC, the Roman commander Livius captured Rhoiteion from the Macedonian forces. Soon after, in 188 BC following the Treaty of Apamea, Rhoiteion was part of the Hellenistic Kingdom of Pergamon, and under the sway of Ilium. At the beginning of the Hellenistic period Rhoiteion may have moved 1.8 km to the south-west from the Baba Kale spur to a site known as Tavolia (40°00′03″N 26°16′53″E) and remained there throughout the Roman period.

== The Tomb of Ajax ==
Rhoiteion was best known in Antiquity for the Tomb of Ajax, the Greek hero who had died during the Trojan Wars, which was located in the west of its territory near the war memorial at İn Tepe (not to be confused with the town of the same name to the north-east). The association between Rhoiteion and the burial place of Telamonian Ajax (as opposed to Locrian Ajax) first appears in a fragment of the Hellenistic poet Euphorion of Chalcis (early 3rd century BC), who writes, "Purple hyacinth, one story of poets is that, on the Rhoetean sands, after the fall of the descendant of Aeacus [i.e. Ajax], you sprang up from his blood with a lament in your inscription". The story does not appear again until it is picked up by the Roman poet Catullus (c. 84 – c. 54 BC), an avid reader of Hellenistic poetry, who in Poem 65 speaks of the unmarked grave of his drowned brother, "[where] under the shore of Rhoeteum the soil of Troy lies heavy". In Book 6 of Virgil's Aeneid, published in full after his death in 19 BC, he refers to the tomb at Rhoeteion being that of Deiphobus, Ajax's great rival; it has been suggested that Virgil does this to upset a Roman reader's expectations, thus indicating that Rhoeteum was already associated with Ajax's tomb. By contrast, the Augustan poet Ovid in Book 11 of the Metamorphoses speaks of a place "on Trojan soil ... close to the sea, to the right of Sigeion, to the left of Rhoeteum" which is not Ajax's tomb or the Aeantion promontory (as the description might suggest), but instead "an old altar of Jupiter the oracular, god of the thunder".

The geographer Strabo, writing in the latter half of Augustus' reign, relates that the Emperor Augustus returned to the Rhoiteians a statue of Ajax which had adorned the top of his burial tumulus until Mark Anthony had stolen it to give to his lover Cleopatra. Strabo then explains, "For Anthony took away the finest dedications from the most famous temples to gratify the Egyptian woman (i.e. Cleopatra), but Augustus gave them back to the gods". Following the reign of Augustus, this became the dominant version of the myth for the rest of Antiquity. In Pliny the Elder (mid-1st century AD) we hear of the promontory near İn Tepe referred to as Aeantion meaning 'the place of Ajax' (from Ancient Greek Αἰάντειον). Prior to this, the only mention of this promontory was in an Athenian inscription from 375 BC referring to a military action by the general Chabrias and honouring "the soldiers who were allies at Aianteion on the Hellespont". In the 2nd century AD further details appear: the Greek travel writer Pausanias claimed that a local Mysian had informed him that the sea washed away the entrance to Ajax's tomb, and when locals looked inside, they discovered the bones of a giant man 11 cubits (or 5 metres) tall. This story recalls a common view in Graeco-Roman Antiquity that heroes of a previous age were much larger than present-day men; a famous example is the story of the discovery of the bones of Orestes, the son of Agamemnon, which the 5th century BC historian Herodotus relates. It was also in this period (probably during the reign of the philhellenic emperor Hadrian) that the tumulus of Ajax was renovated and given its present vaulting, suggesting local investment in what had become Rhoiteion's great attraction.

== Bibliography ==
- L. Bürchner, RE IA (1914) s.v. Ῥοίτειον, coll. 1006–7.
- L. Robert, Etudes de Numismatique Grecque (Paris, 1951).
- L. Robert, Monnaies antiques en Troade (Geneva, 1966).
- J.M. Cook, The Troad (Oxford, 1973) 77–90.
- L. Kallet-Marx, Money, Expense, and Naval Power in Thucydides' History, 1–5.24 (Berkeley, 1993).
- P. Bleisch, 'The Empty Tomb at Rhoeteum: Deiphobus and the Problem of the Past in Aeneid 6.494–547' Classical Antiquity 18.2 (1999) 187–226.
- C. Carusi, Isole e Peree in Asia Minore (Pisa, 2003) 32–3.
- S. Mitchell, 'Rhoiteion' in M.H. Hansen and T.H. Nielsen (eds.), An Inventory of Archaic and Classical Poleis (Oxford, 2004) no. 790.
