= Poseidion =

Poseidion (also Posidion or Poseideion, from Poseidon) was a frequent Greek placename along coastlines in the classical antiquity:

- Another name of Poseidium (Karpathos), an ancient city on Karpathos
- Cape Poseidion (Arabia), a promontory in the Red Sea
- Ancient name of Ras al-Bassit, a small town in Syria

== See also ==
- Poseidium (disambiguation)
