= Poseidium (disambiguation) =

Poseidium is an ancient town in the Delian League on the northeast coast of ancient Euboea.

Poseidium may also refer to:

- Poseidium (Karpathos), a town of ancient Greece on the island of Karpathos
- Poseidium (Chalcidice), a Chalcidice town in ancient Macedonia
