= Skolos =

Skolos may refer to:

- Skolos (Boeotia), a town of ancient Boeotia
- Skolos (Chalcidice), a town of ancient Chalcidice
- Nancy Skolos (born 1955), American graphic designer
