= Peggy Wilson =

Peggy Wilson may refer to:

- Peggy Wilson (golfer) (born 1934)
- Peggy Wilson (Alaska politician) (born 1945)

== See also ==
- Margaret Wilson (disambiguation)
