= Pigres =

Pigres may refer to:

- Pigres of Halicarnassus first ancient Greek poet, who introduced the iambic trimeter.
- Pigres of Caria naval commander of Xerxes
- Pigres of Paionia deported in Anatolia by Darius
