= Scolus =

Scolus may refer to:

- Scolus (Boeotia), a town of ancient Boeotia
- Scolus (Chalcidice), a town of ancient Chalcidice
