= Chytropolis =

Chytropolis (Ancient Greek: Χυτρόπολις) was a town of the Chalcidice in ancient Macedonia. Its name occurs in a fragment of Theopompus collected by Stephanus of Byzantium, who places it in Thrace and indicates that it was a colony of Aphytis.

Its site is unlocated.
