= Archaeological Museum of Olynthos =

Museum in Greece

Coordinates: 40.2900°N 23.3521°E

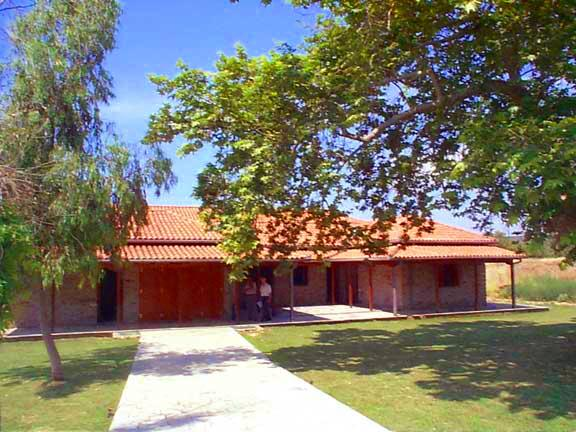
Outside view

The Archaeological Museum of Olynthos opened in July 1998 in a building on the archaeological site of ancient Olynthos, 5 km from Moudania, Halkidiki in Central Macedonia, Greece.

The archaeological finds from the site are housed in the Archaeological Museum of Polygyros. The Olynthos Museum has only audio-visual material, the purpose of which is to give visitors a picture of the archaeological site of Olynthos, starting with the history of the city and moving on to a description of the excavation and the restoration.

Visitors learn that the city was built to a Hippodamian plan (two wide avenues with insulae containing ten (square) houses, and a sewage pipe every five houses). An Olynthian house took the form of a pastas (a square, two-story dwelling with rooms giving onto a covered inner courtyard) and was built of river stones and clay, with the superstructure being of unbaked bricks reinforced with a timber framework. In most of the houses, the floor was of compacted earth, but four houses have mosaic floors made with river pebbles and mortar.

Photographs and texts describe the domestic organisation (preparation of food, storage of foodstuffs, weaving) and the economic life of the city (stonework, koroplastics, agricultural activities, recreation, symposia).

Visitors also learn about the course of the excavations, from David M. Robinson's work in 1928 to the excavations of 1990 and 1992.

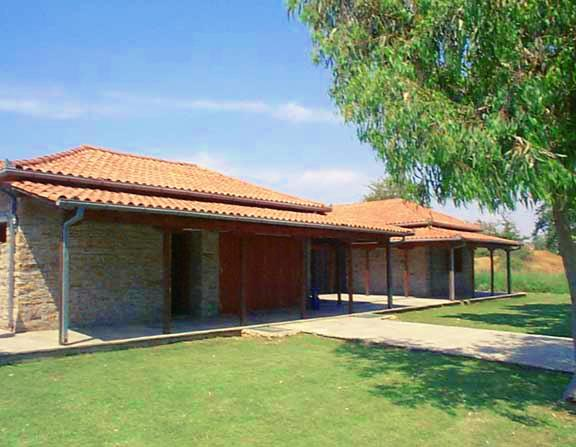
Outside view

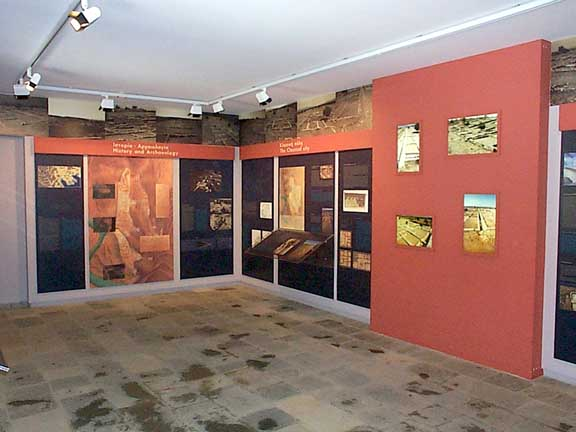
Interior view

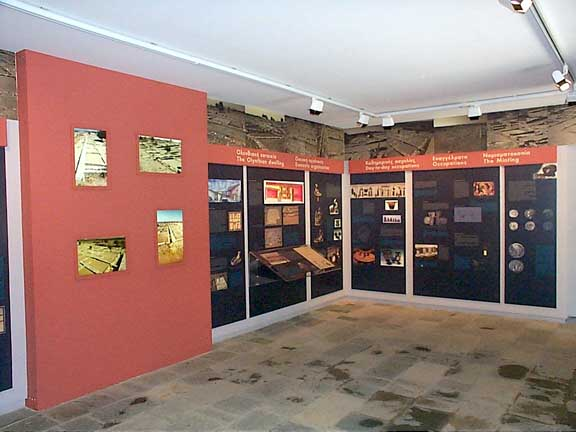
Interior view

== Sources ==
- This article incorporates text from the corresponding article at the Museums of Macedonia website, commissioned by the Macedonian Heritage foundation, written by Vlasis Vlasidis, and published under a CC-BY-SA-3.0 license.
