= Dicaea =

Dicaea or Dikaia may refer to:

- Dicaea (Macedonia), a town of ancient Macedonia, Greece
- Dicaea (Thrace), a town of ancient Thrace, Greece
- Dikaia, a town in modern Greece
