= Thestorus =

Thestorus or Thestoros (Ancient Greek: Θέστορος or Θέστωρος) was a town of the Chalcidice in ancient Macedonia. It probably belonged to the Delian League since it appears in the tribute records of Athens of 422/1 BCE, but appears in no other extant tribute records. It is cited in a fragment of Theopompus preserved by Stephanus of Byzantium, who states it belonged to Thrace.

Its site is in unlocated, but somewhere in Chalcidice close to the territory of Olynthus.
