= Cebrene =

Ancient Greek city

- Κεβρήνη (Greek)
- Location within Turkey
- 39°44′39″N 26°33′59″E
- Location: Turkey
- Region: Çanakkale Province

Cebrene (Ancient Greek: Κεβρήνη), also spelled Cebren (Ancient Greek: Κεβρήν), was an ancient Greek city in the middle Skamander valley in the Troad region of Anatolia. According to some scholars, the city's name was changed to Antiocheia in the Troad (Ancient Greek: Ἀντιόχεια τῆς Τρωάδος) for a period during the 3rd century BC (see below). Its archaeological remains have been located on Çal Dağ in the forested foothills of Mount Ida (modern Kaz Dağı), approximately 7 km to the south of the course of the Skamander. The site was first identified by the English amateur archaeologist Frank Calvert in 1860.

The city was supposedly named after the river-god Cebren.

== History ==
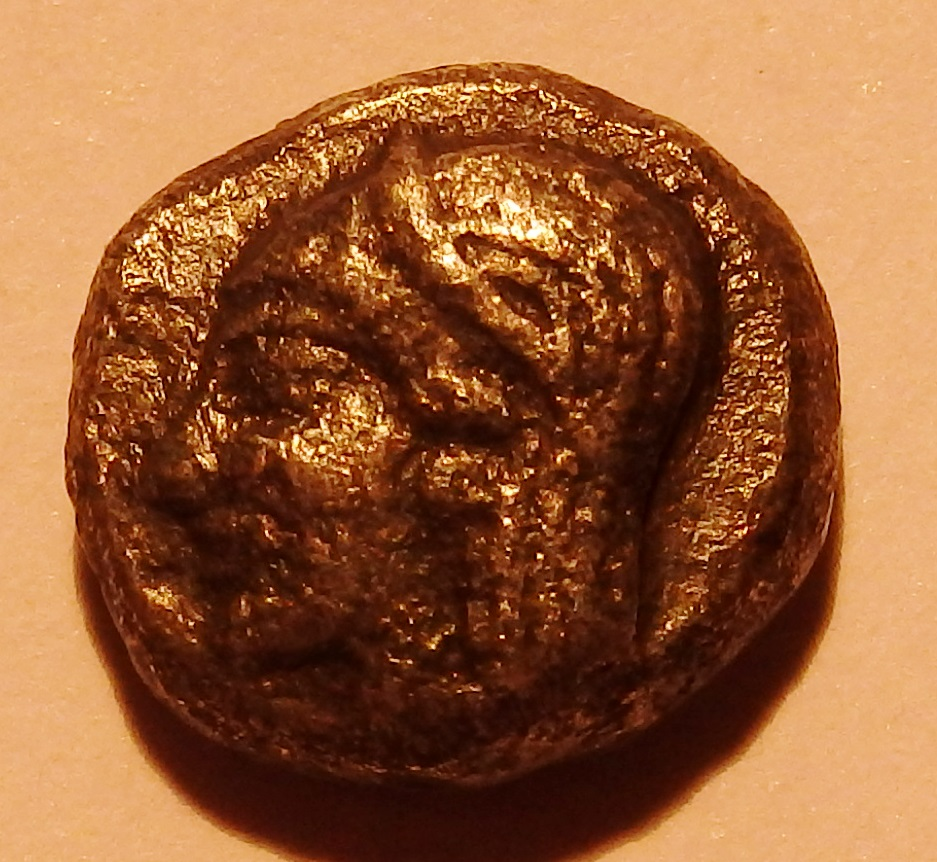
A diobol of Cebrene

=== Foundation ===
The earliest Greek archaeological remains found at Cebren date to the mid-7th and early 6th century BC and were found together with indigenous pottery, suggesting that to begin with the city was a mixed Greco-Anatolian community. Writing in the early 4th century BC, Xenophon implies that the population of Cebren ca. 400 BC still consisted of both Greek and Anatolian elements, indicating that the two ethnic groups co-existed long after the period of Greek colonization. Sources dating to the mid-4th century BC considered the city an Aeolian Greek foundation, and the historian Ephorus of Cyme claimed that its founders were in fact from his own city, although this statement needs to be treated with some caution, since Ephorus was notorious in antiquity for exaggerating his hometown's importance. While we cannot ascertain the truth of Ephorus' statement, we can be sure that the early settlers were Aeolians, since a grave inscription for a citizen of Kebren written in the Aeolic dialect has been found at nearby Gergis.

=== Classical antiquity ===
In the 5th century BC Cebren was a member of the Delian League and is listed in the Hellespontine district paying a tribute to Athens of 3 Talents from 454/3 down to 425/4, except in 450/49 when it only paid 8,700 drachmas. Following the defeat of Athens at the end of the Peloponnesian War in 404 BC, Cebren came under the control of Zenis, the tyrant of Dardanus, and his wife Mania who together controlled the Troad on behalf of the Persian satrap Pharnabazos. Cebren was captured by the Spartan commander Dercylidas in 399 BC, but soon after returned to Persian control. In 360/59, the Greek mercenary commander Charidemus briefly captured the city before being repelled by the Persian satrap Artabazos. At some point in the 4th century BC Cebren produced coinage depicting a satrap's head as the obverse type, indicating the city's close relationship with its Persian overlords. Cebren ceased to exist as an independent city ca. 310 when Antigonus I Monophthalmus founded Antigonia Troas (after 301 BC renamed Alexandria Troas) and included Cebren in the synoecism.

=== Antiocheia in the Troad ===
A rare series of bronze coins display the obverse and reverse types of Cebren (ram's head/head of Apollo), but bear the legend Ἀντιοχέων (Antiocheōn, '(coin of the) Antiocheis'). On the basis of these coins it has been argued, most notably by the French epigrapher Louis Robert, that Cebren was refounded by Antiochus I Soter as Antiocheia in the Troad following Antiochus' victory over Lysimachus at the Battle of Corupedium in 281 BC, after which most of western Asia Minor came under his control. Moreover, Robert noted that some of these coins bore the letters B and K and included a club beside the ram's head: since the club is the typical symbol of the coinage of Birytis, an unlocated city in the Troad, Robert argued that these letters referred to Birytis and Kebren and were evidence of a synoecism or sympoliteia between the two communities which had produced the new foundation of Antiocheia in the Troad. Robert's arguments have been repeatedly criticized by the archaeologist John Manuel Cook, who could discern no archaeological or numismatic evidence for occupation in the Hellenistic period at the site of Çal Dağ. Cook based these claims on only two days of surface survey at Çal Dağ, and as such definitive answers regarding the settlement history of the site in the 3rd century BC will have to await a full excavation.

== See also ==
- List of ancient Greek cities

== Bibliography ==
- A. Plassart, 'Inscriptions de Delphes: la liste de théorodoques' BCH 45 (1921) 1-85.
- L. Robert, Études de Numismatique Grecque (Paris, 1951) 16–31.
- J. M. Cook, The Troad: An Archaeological and Topographical Study (Oxford, 1973) 327–44.
- R. Merkelbach, Die Inschriften von Assos, Inschriften griechischer Städte aus Kleinasien 4 (Bonn 1976).
- J. M. Cook, 'Cities in and around the Troad' ABSA 83 (1988) 7-19.
- S. Mitchell, 'Kebren' in M. H. Hansen and T. H. Nielsen (eds), An Inventory of Archaic and Classical Poleis (Oxford, 2004) no. 780.
