= Gale (Chalcidice) =

Coordinates: 40°6′N 23°47′E

Gale (Greek: Γάλη) was an ancient Greek town on the west coast of the peninsula of Sithonia, Chalcidice, ancient Macedonia. It was a colony of Chalcis.

Gale was mentioned in the Athenian tribute lists for 435/4 – 433/432 BCE. Before 435 its name is absent from the lists, probably because the city then paid its due via a syntely, a federation of several cities paying their taxes jointly. In 432/1 Gale's name is absent too, probably because in that year, at the beginning of the Peloponnesian War, the city took part in a revolt against Athens as head of the Delian League. In the lists for 425 and 421 BCE Gale was assessed a negligible tax amount, which suggests that the city by that time had been destroyed, or at least depopulated.

In classical literature Gale's name is mentioned nowhere, but it is believed that the city of Gale was in fact meant in two cases where, due to an error in writing, a better-known nearby city was mentioned: Herodotus (Histories, VII.122) speaks of Galepsus where Gale was meant, and Thucydides (The Peloponnesian War, V.18.6) speaks of "Sanaious" (inhabitants of Sane, a nearby colony of Andros) where "Galaious" (inhabitants of Gale) was meant.
