= Mary Ross Ellingson =

Classical archaeologist

- Ellingson in 1931
- Born: Helen Madeline Mary Ross; 1906; Edmonton, Alberta, Canada
- Died: 1993 (aged 86–87)
- Education: University of Alberta; Johns Hopkins University
- Known for: Excavations at Olynthus
- Spouse: Rudolph Conrad Ellingson
- Scientific career
- Fields: Classical archaeology
- Workplaces: University of Evansville

Mary Ross Ellingson (1906 – 1993) was a Canadian archaeologist who worked on the excavations at Olynthus in Greece, where she focused on the use of terracotta figurines in ancient Greece. She did not receive due credit for her work at the time because her research was published by her mentor, David Moore Robinson, under his own name. Robinson's plagiarism of her work only came to light in 2014.

== Early years ==
Helen Madeline Mary Ross was born in 1906 in Edmonton, Alberta, Canada, and went on to study at the University of Alberta. During her undergraduate years, she studied classical languages and culture and showed an interest in journalism. She served as editor of The Gateway newspaper and submitted articles to a local non-collegiate newspaper, The Edmonton Bulletin.

After her 1939 marriage to Rudolph Conrad Ellingson, who received his doctorate in chemistry from Johns Hopkins University, she was known as Mary Ross Ellingson.

== Career ==
In 1930, Ellingson enrolled as a graduate student in archaeology at Johns Hopkins University, studying under David Moore Robinson. The following year she joined Robinson's excavations at the ancient city of Olynthus in northeastern Greece, where she supervised dozens of workmen excavating houses on the site. The Olynthus dig became famous in classical archaeology as the first to focus on houses and the domestic life of ancient Greece instead of on large public buildings like temples. Ellingson photographed the work in progress and created albums of these documentary photographs. Her images show the archaeological techniques in use at the time, as well as daily life in the nearby village of Myriophyto where the crew lived.

Ellingson kept her own set of excavation records in parallel with the site's official records, including documentation of all the terracotta figurines discovered during the season's dig. For her master's thesis, she analyzed both the figurines themselves and the places they were found, demonstrating that they were used in domestic situations rather than only in public spaces like shrines. Her doctoral dissertation expanded on this analysis with a wider sample of figurines from other sites in Greece and the Balkans.

Ellingson never published her own research, but Robinson published it in a 14-volume series entitled Excavations at Olynthus, much of which he wrote himself. With only minor alterations, Ellingson's master's thesis appeared in 1933 as volume VII of the series, and her dissertation in 1952 as the first part of volume XIV. Robinson did not give Ellingson proper credit in either volume, writing only in the introduction to volume XIV that Ellingson "was a loyal, tactful, and industrious member of the staff at Olynthus and successfully helped supervise the excavation of the East Cemetery. She kept a careful typewritten inventory of the terra-cottas, separate from my note-books and the daily journal, and I have made abundant use of this and her own valuable suggestions." Reviewers praising the two volumes assumed both were by Robinson himself.

So far as is known, Ellingson never told anyone about the incorporation of her two theses into the Excavations at Olynthus series, and the truth of the matter only came to light in a 2014 book about Ellingson's work. In Archaeology, Sexism, and Scandal, archaeology scholar Alan Kaiser attempts but fails to find an explanation that would absolve Robinson of the charge of plagiarizing Ellingson. He attributes the theft of Ellingson's research to a combination of ambition and sexism, noting that in Ellingson's day sexism was pervasive in archaeology, to such an extent that the field was already falling behind other academic fields in its treatment of professional women. One reviewer argues that Johns Hopkins University Press, which published the Excavations at Olynthus series, and Ellingson's alma mater, Johns Hopkins University, should both acknowledge Ellingson as the author of the publications in question. Johns Hopkins University Press subsequently petitioned the Library of Congress to update their record to add Ellingson's name. In October of 2023, the Library of Congress added Ellingson's name to the Excavations at Olynthus series to address this historical injustice.

Ellingson appears to have left academia after getting her doctorate, although Robinson mentions her as teaching at Mount Royal College in Calgary, Canada, in the early 1950s. In the 1960s, after having raised a family, Ellingson returned to academia to become a respected archaeology professor at the University of Evansville, Indiana; she retired in 1974 without publishing anything in her field under her own name. After Ellingson died on December 26, 1993, her daughters donated Ellingson's Olynthus photo albums to the university archives.

== Publications (uncredited) ==
- Excavations at Olynthus VII: The Terra-Cottas of Olynthus Found in 1931 (1933)
- Excavations at Olynthus XIV: Terracottas, Lamps, and Coins Found in 1934 and 1938 (1952; chapter 1 and part of chapter 2)
