= George M. A. Hanfmann =

Russian-American archaeologist and scholar

George Maxim Anossov Hanfmann
- Born: November 1911; Saint Petersburg, Russian Empire
- Died: 13 March 1986 (aged 74); Watertown, Massachusetts
- Education: Harvard University
- Occupations: Classical archaeologist and art historian

George Maxim Anossov Hanfmann (born November 1911, in St. Petersburg, Russia; died March 13, 1986, in Watertown, Massachusetts) was an archaeologist and scholar of ancient Mediterranean art.

== Biography ==
He studied at the University of Jena under Ernst Buschor and Hans Diepolder, and then at the University of Berlin with Werner Jaeger, where he earned his first doctorate. He emigrated to the United States, becoming naturalized in 1940. Hanfmann became a student of David Moore Robinson, earning a second Ph.D. at Johns Hopkins University in 1935. During World War II he served in the Office of War Information in London as radio editor. He returned to Harvard and became a curator at the Fogg Art Museum. By 1956 he had progressed at Harvard from junior fellow to full professor. He was one of the first to be awarded the title of University Professor, which is the position from which he retired shortly before his death. [Note: The title of University Professor was created in 1935 to honor individuals whose groundbreaking work crosses the boundaries of multiple disciplines, allowing them to pursue research at any of Harvard's Schools.] He established the Department of Ancient Art and trained students, including Cornelius Clarkson Vermeule III. He was elected to the American Academy of Arts and Sciences in 1953. In 1958 he began excavations at ancient Sardis and continued there until 1976. He was elected to the American Philosophical Society in 1970. In 1978 he received the Gold Medal from the Archaeological Institute of America. He retired from Harvard in 1982 after teaching his legendary course, "Greek Art & Culture," for the last time spring semester of 1981−82.

== Works ==
- For a complete bibliography, see: "Bibliography of George M. A. Hanfmann, 1935-71." In Studies Presented to George M.A. Hanfmann. Cambridge, MA: Harvard University Press, 1971, pp. xii-xx. also, Joanee Bloom. "Bibliography of George M. A. Hanfmann, 1971-86." American Journal of Archaeology 91.2 (April 1987): 264–266.
- Ancient Art in Private American Collections: A Loan Exhibition at the Fogg Art Museum of Harvard University (Cambridge, 1954).
- [Jerome Lectures] From Croesus to Constantine (Ann Arbor, 1975).
- The Season Sarcophagus in Dumbarton Oaks (Cambridge, 1952).
- and Mierse, William E., and Foss, Clive. Sardis from Prehistoric to Roman Times: Results of the Archaeological Exploration of Sardis, 1958-1975. (Cambridge, 1983).
- [D.Phil. thesis]Altetruskische Plastik I: Die menschliche Gestalt in der Rundplastik bis zum Ausgang der orientalisierenden Kunst. (Wurzburg, 1936).
- Classical Sculpture. The History of Western Sculpture 1. (Greenwich, CT,1967).
- Observations on Roman Portraiture. Collection Latomus 11. (Brussels, 1953).
- Roman Art: a Modern Survey of the Art of Imperial Rome. (Greenwich, 1964).

== Sources ==
- [necrology] D.G. Mitten, and Joanne Bloom. "George Maxim Anossov Hanfmann 1911–1986." American Journal of Archaeology 91. 2 (April 1987): 259–266. https://www.jstor.org/stable/505220
- Archäologenbildnisse: Porträts und Kurzbiographien von Klassichen Archäologen deutscher Sprache Reinhard Lullies, ed. (Mainz am Rhein, 1988) 313–314.
