= Karpathos (city) =

Coordinates: 35°32′57″N 27°10′13″E

Karpathos or Carpathus (Ancient Greek: Κάρπαθος) was a city of ancient Greece on the island of Karpathos. Its harbour was Poseidium, and the city was located at modern Aperi.
