= Poseidium (Chalcidice) =

Poseidium or Poseidion (Ancient Greek: Ποσείδιον) was a town of the Chalcidice in ancient Macedonia. It belonged to the Delian League since it appears in the tribute records of Athens of 422/1 BCE, where it belonged to the district of Thrace and had to pay a phoros of 1000 drachmas,

Its exact location is unknown but it has been suggested that it could be related to the sanctuary of Poseidon that Herodotus mentions between the cities of Argilus and Stagira. Another possibility is to locate it on a promontory located 4 km (2.5 mi) from Mende.
