= Margaret Wilson (disambiguation) =

Margaret Wilson (born 1947) is a New Zealand politician.

Margaret Wilson may also refer to:

- Margaret Wilson (Scottish martyr) (1667–1685), one of the Solway Martyrs
- Margaret Bayne Wilson (1795-1835), Scottish missionary to India
- Margaret Oliphant Wilson (1828–1897), birth name of Scottish novelist and historical writer Margaret Oliphant
- Margaret O'Connor Wilson (1856-1942), American civic leader
- Margaret Barclay Wilson (1863–1945), professor of physiology
- Margaret Wilson (novelist) (1882–1973), American novelist
- Margaret Woodrow Wilson (1886–1944), first lady of the United States, daughter of U.S. president Woodrow Wilson
- Margaret Wilson (tennis) (fl.1930s), Australian former tennis player
- Margaret Bush Wilson (1919–2009), American activist
- Margaret Dauler Wilson (1939–1998), American philosopher and professor of philosophy
- Margaret Wilson (cricketer) (born 1946), Australian cricket player
- Margaret Wilson (judge) (born 1953), justice of the Supreme Court of Queensland
- Maggie Wilson (born 1989), British-Filipino model, actress and beauty queen
- Margaret Wilson (Australian writer), Australian television writer

== In fiction ==
- Margaret Wilson (EastEnders), fictional character in the BBC soap opera EastEnders

== See also ==
- Peggy Wilson (disambiguation)
