= Sthennis =

Olynthian sculptor

Sthennis (Greek: Σθέννις) was an Olynthian sculptor from the 4th century BC. He was the son of Herodotus and father of Herodorus, both sculptors as well.
