= Achilleion (Troad) =

Ancient Greek city

- Ἀχίλλειον (Ancient Greek)
- Location within Turkey
- 39°54′54″N 26°9′9″E
- Type: Settlement
- Location: Yeniköy, Çanakkale Province, Turkey
- Region: Troad

Achilleion (Ancient Greek: Ἀχίλλειον, romanized: Achilleion; Latin: Achilleum) was an ancient Greek city in the south-west of the Troad region of Anatolia. It has been located on a promontory known as Beşika Burnu ('cradle promontory') about 8 km south of Sigeion. Beşika Burnu is 2 km south of the modern village of Yeniköy in the Ezine district of Çanakkale Province, Turkey. The site considered in classical antiquity to be the tomb of Achilles is a short distance inland at a tumulus known as Beşiktepe. Achilleion in the Troad is not to be confused with Achilleion near Smyrna and Achilleion in the territory of Tanagra.

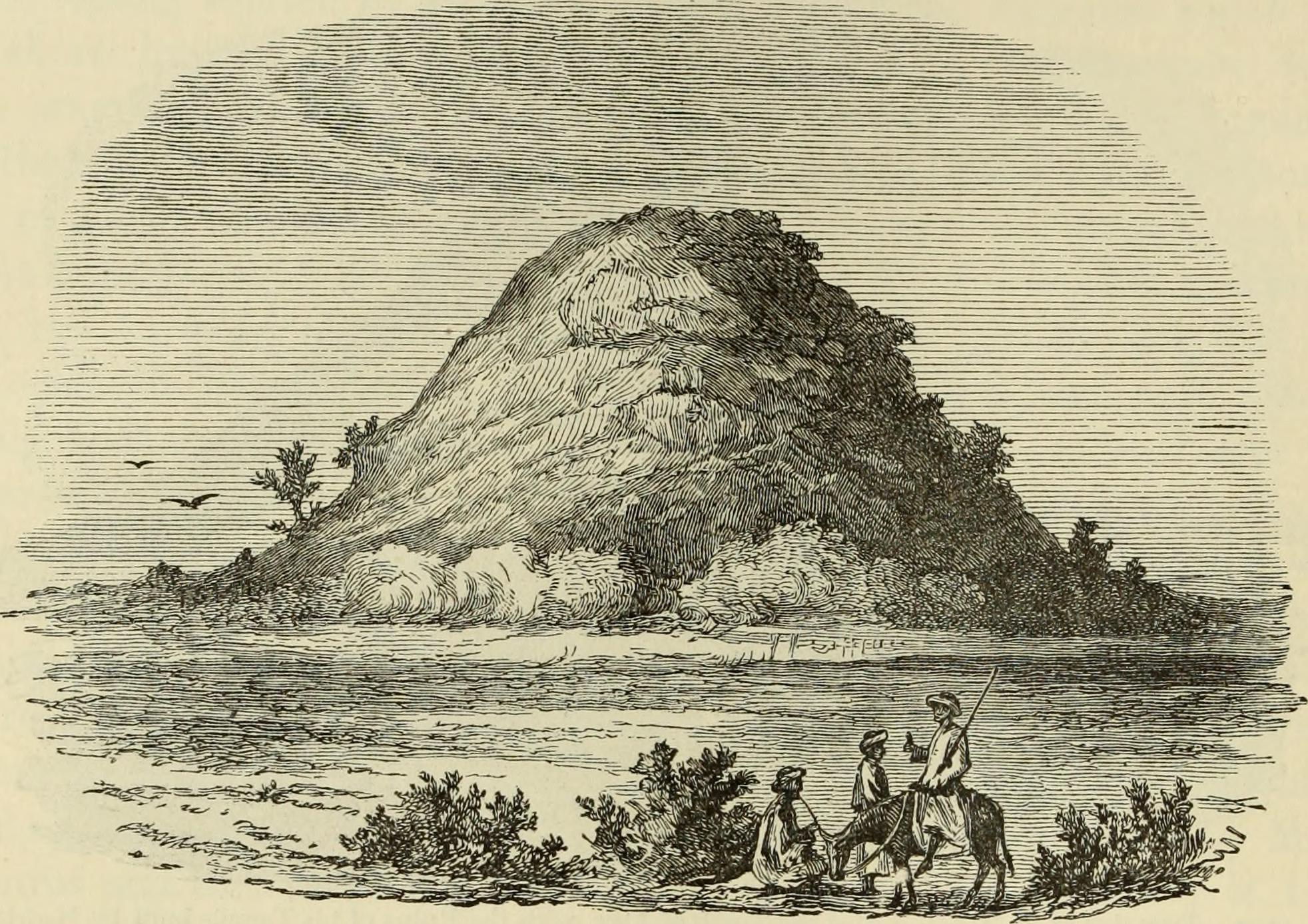
A tumulus that was traditionally considered to be that of Achilles: from Heinrich Schliemann, "Troy and its remains," (1875), opp. p. 178.

== Tomb of Achilles and Patroclus ==
The otherwise obscure polis of Achilleion was most famous in classical antiquity for its association with Achilles, after whom it was named ('the place of Achilles'). According to some sources, while passing by Ilion in 334 BC Alexander the Great sacrificed at the Tomb of Achilles. This story became famous, and in the mid-1st century BC it is mentioned by the politician and writer Cicero in his Pro Archia Poeta. In AD 216 the Emperor Caracalla emulated Alexander when, on passing Ilion on his way to a war against Parthia, he held funeral games around the tumulus. Following the abandonment of the settlement at Achilleion in the late Hellenistic period, writers began to associate the tomb with nearby Sigeion to the north.

== History ==
The first mention of Achilleion is as a fortified settlement from which Mytilene conducted its attacks on Athenian controlled Sigeion to the north in the early 6th century BCE. It is not clear whether Achilleion had been settled earlier, but the ceramic record also begins at this point, suggesting that it had not. Recent excavations have established that the walls of the settlement also date to the first half of the 6th century BCE, further corroborating the literary accounts of Herodotus and Strabo regarding its origins. Achilleion remained under Mytilenaean control until Athens brought an end to the Mytilenean revolt in 427 BCE and took over all the so-called Actaean cities in the Troad. Achilleion appears in the Athenian tribute lists for 425/4 and 422/1 BCE, indicating that it had joined the Delian League. The legend AX (ACH) which some bronze coins found in this region bear is thought to refer to Ach (illeion) and suggest that c. 350 - 300 BCE the city minted its own coins. King Lysimachus synoecized Ilion with many surrounding communities including Achilleion during his reign (306 - 281 BCE), effectively ending Achilleion's political independence. The testimony of Demetrius of Scepsis, who hailed from a nearby town in the Troad, indicates that there was still a hamlet known as Achilleion on the site in the mid-2nd century BCE. It is to around this time that the latest ceramic finds from Achilleion date, suggesting that the site became uninhabited soon afterwards.

== Bibliography ==
- O. Hirschfeld, RE I (1893) s.v. 'Achilleion (1)' col. 220.
- J.M. Cook, The Troad (Oxford, 1973) 178–86.
- J. Brown, 'The Tomb of Achilles' in Homeric sites around Troy (Canberra, 2017) 227-249 (illustrated).
- P.A. Brunt, Arrian. Anabasis Alexanderi, books I-IV (Cambridge Mass., 1976).
- M. Korfmann, 'Beşik-Tepe. Vorbericht über die Ergebnisse der Granungen von 1985 und 1986' Archäologische Anzeiger (1988) 391–8.
- A.U. Kossatz, 'Beşik-Tepe 1985 und 1986; zur archaischen Keramik vom Beşik-Tepe' Archäologische Anzeiger (1988) 398–404.
- A. Schulz, Die Stadtmauer von Neandreia in der Troas. Asia Minor Studien 38 (Bonn, 2000).
- C. Carusi, Isole e Peree in Asia Minore (Pisa, 2003) 41–2.
- S. Mitchell, 'Achilleion' in M.H. Hansen and T.H. Nielsen (eds.), An Inventory of Archaic and Classical Poleis (Oxford, 2004) no. 766.
