= Logographer (history) =

Greek historiographers and chroniclers before Herodotus

The logographers (from the Ancient Greek λογογράφος logográphos, a compound of λόγος lógos, here meaning "story" or "prose", and γράφω gráphō, "write") were the Greek historiographers and chroniclers before Herodotus, "the father of history". Herodotus himself called his predecessors λογοποιοί (logopoioí, from ποιέω poiéō, "to make").

Most of their representatives came from Ionia and its islands, and their position was most favourably situated for the acquisition of knowledge concerning the distant countries of East and West. They wrote in the Ionic dialect in what was called the aperiodic style and preserved the poetic character, if not the style, of their epic model. Their criticism makes a crude attempt to rationalize the current legends and traditions connected with the founding of cities, the genealogies of ruling families, and the manners and customs of individual peoples. Of scientific criticism there is no trace whatever and so they are often called "chroniclers" rather than "historians".

The first logographer of note was Cadmus (dated to the 6th century BC), a perhaps mythical resident of Miletus, who wrote on the history of his city. Other logographers flourished from the middle of the 6th century BC until the Greco-Persian Wars; Pherecydes of Athens, who died about 400 BC, is generally considered the last. Hecataeus of Miletus (6th–5th century BC), in his Genealogiai, was the first of them to attempt (not entirely successfully) to separate the mythic past from the true historic past, which marked a crucial step in the development of genuine historiography. He is the only source that Herodotus cites by name. After Herodotus, the genre declined but regained some popularity in the Hellenistic era.

The logographers, though they worked within the same mythic tradition, were distinct from the epic poets of the Trojan War cycle because they wrote in prose, in a non-periodic style which Aristotle (Rhetoric, 1409a 29) calls λέξις εἰρομένη (léxis eiroménē, from εἴρω eírō, "attach, join up"), that is, a "continuous" or "running" style.

== Notable examples ==
Dionysius of Halicarnassus (On Thucydides, 5) names those who were most famous in the classical world. They are noted with an asterisk (*) in the following incomplete list of logographers:

- Acusilaus of Argos, who paraphrased in prose, correcting the tradition where it seemed necessary, the genealogical works of Hesiod in the Ionic dialect. He confined his attention to the prehistoric period and did not attempt a real history.
- Cadmus of Miletus*
- Charon* of Lampsacus, author of histories of Persia, Libya, and Ethiopia, and of annals of his native town, with lists of the prytaneis and archons, and of the chronicles of Lacedaemonian kings.
- Damastes of Sigeion, pupil of Hellanicus of Lesbos, author of genealogies of the combatants before Troy and an ethnographic and statistical list of short treatises on poets, sophists, and geographical subjects.
- Hecataeus of Miletus*
- Hellanicus of Lesbos*, provides the earliest known account of the founding of Rome by Aeneas
- Hippys* and Glaucus, both of Rhegium; the first wrote histories of Italy and Sicily, the second a treatise on ancient poets and musicians which was used by Harpocration and Pseudo-Plutarch
- Melesagoras* of Chalcedon
- Pherecydes of Athens*
- Stesimbrotos of Thasos, opponent of Pericles and reputed author of a political pamphlet on Themistocles, Thucydides, and Pericles.
- Xanthus*, of Sardis in Lydia, author of a history of Lydia and one of the chief authorities used by Nicolaus of Damascus.

== Sources ==
- The History of History; Shotwell, James T. (NY, Columbia University Press, 1939)
- The Ancient Greek Historians; Bury, John Bagnell (NY, Dover Publications, 1958)
