= Eunice Stebbins =

American archeologist

Eunice Stebbins Couch
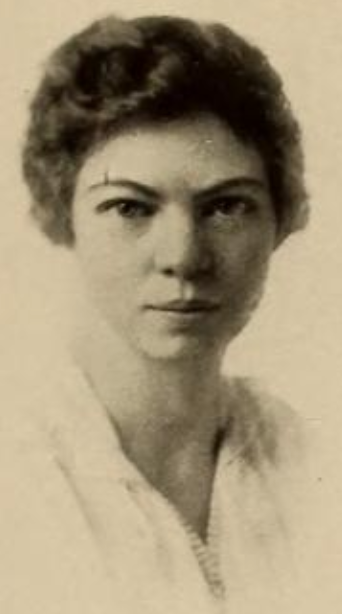
- Eunice Stebbins, from the 1916 yearbook of Smith College
- Born: Eunice Burr Stebbins; November 11, 1893; Newark Valley, New York
- Died: July 1992 (age 98); Providence, Rhode Island
- Occupation: Archaeologist
- Spouse: Herbert Newell Couch

Academic background
- Education: Smith College; Columbia University; American Academy in Rome; Johns Hopkins University; American School of Classical Studies in Athens

Academic work
- Discipline: Classical archaeology
- Notable works: The Dolphin in the Literature and Art of Greece and Rome

Eunice Burr Stebbins Couch (November 11, 1893 – July 1992) was an American archeologist who specialized in the ancient coins of Greece.

== Early life and education ==
Eunice Burr Stebbins was born November 11, 1893, in Newark Valley, New York. She spent a great deal of her childhood living in Europe and became fluent in French and German. Her family returned to the United States in 1908 and she enrolled in Miss Capen's School in Northampton, Massachusetts. She graduated from the school in 1912.

She attended Smith College in Northampton, Massachusetts from 1912 to 1916, where she received her BA in classics She enrolled at Columbia University in New York in 1919 studying the classics and archeology. She travelled to Europe in 1920 and spent 1920–1921 attending lectures at the American Academy in Rome. She lived in Rome from 1920 to 1924 and became fluent in Italian.

She returned to the United States and again enrolled at Columbia University from 1924–1925. In 1925 she moved to Maryland and attended Johns Hopkins University as a graduate student, working with David Moore Robinson. She obtained her MA at the university in 1926 and her PhD in 1927.

Stebbens's scholarly interest was in ancient coins and she studied the collections of the American Numismatic Society in New York City. She published her dissertation "The Dolphin in Literature and Art of Greece and Rome" in 1929. In her paper she discusses dolphin images on ancient Greek and Roman coins.

== Archeological career ==
In 1927, Stebbins was awarded the Sophia Smith Fellowship from Smith College to continue her studies at the American School of Classical Studies in Athens (American School). Her goal in Athens was to continue her research on ancient coins in Greece.

When applying for the fellowship, Stebbins made a request. She asked the Fellowship Committee to allow her American School assignment of cataloguing the coins excavated at Corinth in 1927 to be her original work. This which would meet her Fellowship requirements for Smith College. If the committee declined, she offered to pursue an epigraphy project as her original work.

The committee turned down her request and she subsequently worked on an epigraphic project during her Fellowship year. The result of that work was an article published in the 1929 fall publication of the American Journal of Archaeology, "An Interpretation of the Prescript πολες αυται φορον ταχσαμεναι in the Athenian Tribute Lists,” (Oct.-Dec. 1929), pp 502–514. Stebbins's catalogue work on the 1927 coins was incorporated into a larger catalogue of work under the supervision of Professor Bellinger. "When the Corinth excavation coins were later published in 1935 there was no mention of Stebbins as a contributor to the study or the catalogue."

Stebbins met her future husband Herbert Newell Couch when they were both graduate students in classics at Johns Hopkins University. They both applied for membership in the American School within months of each other. Stebbins in October 1927 and Couch in February 1928. She was granted a Fellowship and he was admitted as an Associate Member of the school. They were married on May 12, 1928, at the British Consulate in Salonika, Greece. When they both left Greece in 1928, Stebbins no longer worked as an archeologist, but she continued her research in numismatics. She studied the coins of Argos, Greece for a number of years and planned on publishing her findings, but her work was never published.

Stebbins was a member of the American Numismatic Society for 65 years. At the end of her life, she donated her collection of ancient coins to the Center for Old World Archeology and Art at Brown University. Stebbins died at the age of 98, in July 1992 in Providence, Rhode Island.
