= Stesimbrotos of Thasos =

5th-century BC Greek sophist and logographer

Stesimbrotos of Thasos (Ancient Greek: Στησίμβροτος; c. 470 BC – c. 420 BC) was a sophist, a rhapsode and logographer, a writer on history, and an opponent of Pericles and reputed author of a political pamphlet On Themistocles, Thucydides, and Pericles. Plutarch used writings by Stesimbrotos in his Life of Pericles, asserting that the coolness between Pericles and his son Xanthippus was due to Pericles seducing his daughter-in-law. Walter Burkert has suggested Stesimbrotos as the author of the Derveni papyrus (Burkert 1987:44, 58 n.6). According to Plato's Ion, he was also known for his literary interpretations of Homer.
