= Ophryneion =

Ancient Greek city

- Ὀφρύνειον (Ancient Greek)
- Location within Turkey
- 40°1′22″N 26°20′6″E
- Type: Settlement
- Periods: Archaic Greece to Byzantine Empire
- Location: İntepe, Çanakkale Province, Turkey
- Region: Troad

History
- Built: 6th century BC

Ophryneion, also called Ophrynium or Ophrynion (Ancient Greek: Ὀφρύνειον Ophrýneion or Ὀφρύνιον Ophrýnion), was an ancient Greek city in the northern Troad region of Anatolia. Its territory was bounded to the west by Rhoiteion and to the east by Dardanus. It was located about 1.5 km north-east of the village of Erenköy in Çanakkale Province, Turkey. The city was situated on the steep brow of a hill overlooking the Dardanelles, hence the origin of its Ancient Greek name ὀφρῦς (ophrus), meaning 'brow of a hill', 'crag'.

== Foundation ==
Ophryneion was supposedly one of a series of cities founded by Akamas the son of Theseus which he subsequently passed off as being founded by Ascanius and Skamandrios, the sons of Aeneas and of Hector respectively. This story was taken from the 2nd century BC scholar Lysimachus of Alexandria, who related it in Book 2 of his Nostoi, who in turn derived it from a late 4th century BC historian known as Dionysios of Chalkis. It has been argued that this tradition reflects a pro-Athenian bias, as it makes the founder of many places in the Troad the son of Athens' most important hero, Theseus, while at the same time explaining away the fact that contemporary traditions made no mention of such a connection. By contrast with the story of Ophryneion being founded by Akamas, which puts the city's origins in the period immediately following the destruction of Troy, surface surveys conducted on the site suggest that it was occupied no earlier than the 6th century BC.

== Tomb of Hector ==
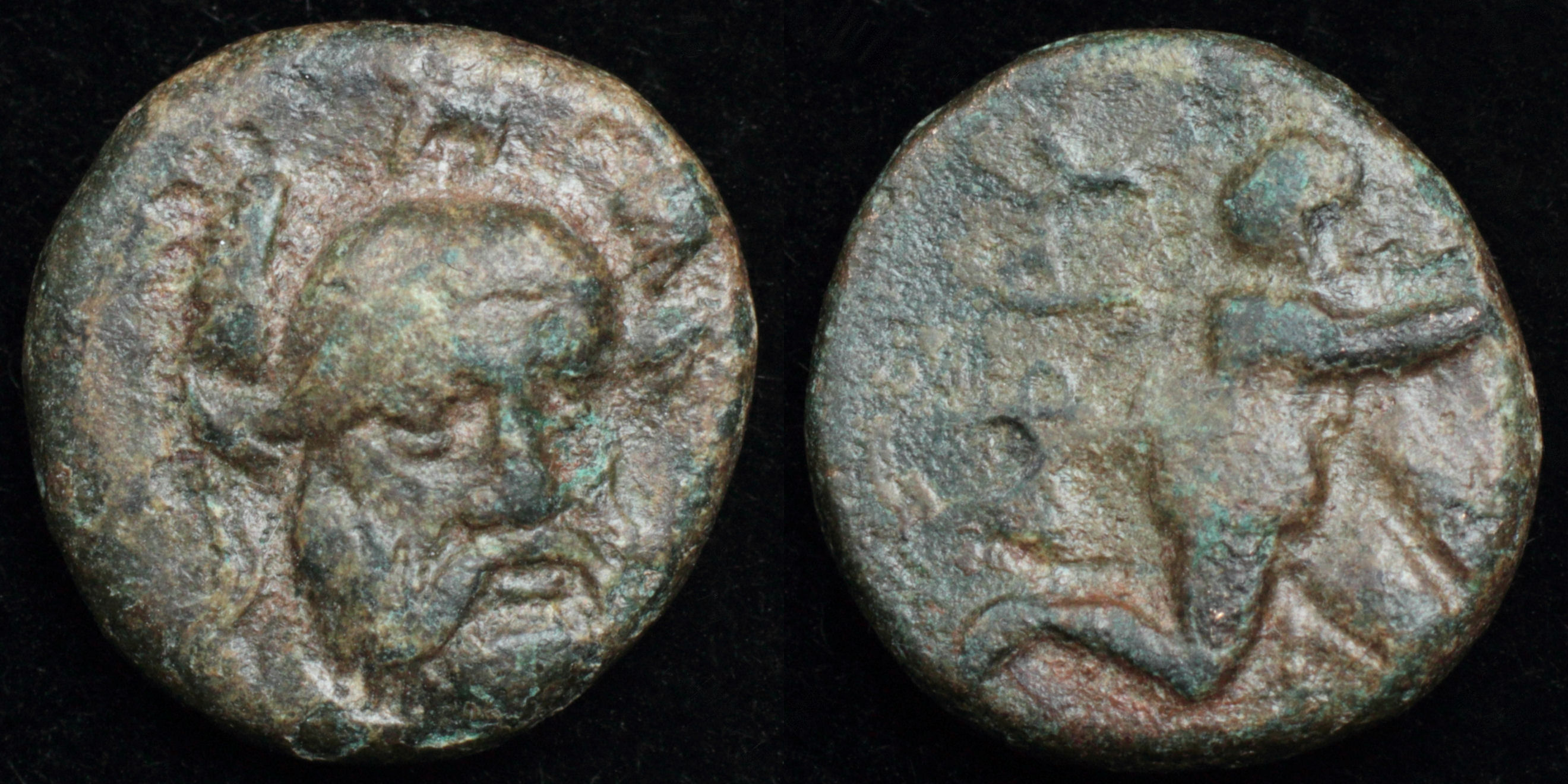
O: bearded Hector wearing triple crested helmet R: infant Dionysos holding bunch of grape, OΦPY this bronze coin was struck in Ophryneion 350–300 BC

In antiquity, Ophryneion was considered to be the site of the tomb of Hector, the famous Trojan hero killed by Achilles in Homer's Iliad. It is possible that a lost play of the 5th century BC tragedian Sophocles referred to this tradition, and it likewise appears to be referred to on a vase from c. 500–490 BC depicting the sack of Troy. However, the first secure reference to this tradition appears on the coinage of Ophryneion, c. 350–300 BC, which depicted Hector. After the city of Thebes was rebuilt in 316 BC (it had been destroyed by Alexander the Great in 335 BC), the bones of Hector were moved from Ophryneion to Thebes in accordance with an oracle which promised Thebes prosperity should this happen. In the early 1st century AD, the geographer Strabo described there being a sacred precinct of Hector near Oryphneion in a conspicuous spot, but scholars have been unable to identify it.

== History ==
Ophryneion is rarely mentioned in extant sources from Antiquity. Herodotus mentions that in 480 BC Xerxes passed by his way up the coast before crossing to Europe at nearby Abydos. Later that century, it was one of the Actaean cities which Mytilene lost control of following the end of the Mytilenean revolt in 427 BC. An inscription from Athens dating to 414/413 BC, which records property confiscated from Athenian nobleman implicated in the mutilation of the Herms, indicates that a relative of Alcibiades, Axiochus, earned revenues from land in the territory of Ophryneion. In the summer of 399 BC, Xenophon stopped here to offer sacrifice while marching home with the Ten Thousand. Later in the 4th century BC, a speech of the orator Demosthenes relates how a man who had been exiled from Byzantium, Parmeno, had decided to settle at Ophryneion, but was forced to move when an earthquake struck the Chersonese and brought down his house, presumably causing similar damage in the rest of the town. Some time shortly after 316 BC, the bones of Hector were moved from Ophryneion to Thebes (see above, The Tomb of Hector), although Strabo's description of Hector's precinct at Ophryneion in the 1st century AD suggests that he was still worshipped there after his bones had moved. Strabo indicates that before the Treaty of Apamea in 188 BC, Ophryneion had been under the sway of Dardanus to the north-east, whereas after this point it instead belonged to Ilium. Pot sherds and coins found at Ophryneion indicate that the site was continuously occupied until at least the Byzantine period, but with the exception of its fame as the one-time location of the bones of Hector, we hear no more about it.

== Bibliography ==
- J.M. Cook, The Troad (Oxford, 1973) 72–7.
- C. Carusi, Isole e Peree in Asia Minore (Pisa, 2003) 37.
- S. Mitchell, 'Ophryneion' in M.H. Hansen and T.H. Nielsen (eds.), An Inventory of Archaic and Classical Poleis (Oxford, 2004) no. 786.
