= Cadmus of Miletus =

Oldest of the logographi

Cadmus of Miletus (Ancient Greek: Κάδμος ὁ Μιλήσιος, Kádmos ho Milésios) was according to some ancient authorities, the oldest of the logographi. Scholars who accept this view, assign him to about 550 BC; others regard him as purely mythical. A confused notice in the Suda mentions three persons of the name: the first, the inventor of the alphabet; the second, the son of Pandion, according to some the first prose writer, a little later than Orpheus, author of a history of the foundation of Miletus and of Ionia generally, in four books; the third, the son of Archelaus, of later date, author of a history of Attica in fourteen books, and of some poems of an erotic character.

As Dionysius of Halicarnassus (Judicium de Thucydide, c. 23) distinctly states that the work current in his time under the name of Cadmus was a forgery, it is most probable that the two first are identical with the Phoenician Cadmus, who, as the reputed inventor of letters, was subsequently transformed into the Milesian and the author of an historical work. In this connection, the old Milesian nobles traced their descent back to the Phoenician or one of his companions.

The text of the notice of the third Cadmus of Miletus in the Suda is unsatisfactory; and it is uncertain whether he is to be explained in the same way, or whether he was an historical personage, of whom all further record is lost.
