= Aphytis =

Ancient city in Chalcidice, Greece

Coordinates: 40°05′58″N 23°26′12″E

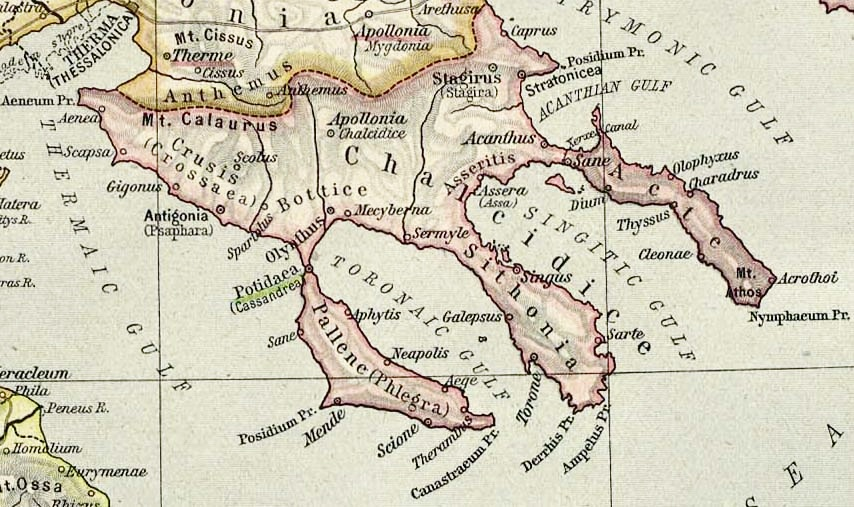
Map of Chalcidice

Aphytis (Ancient Greek: Ἄφυτις), also Aphyte (Ἀφύτη) and Aphytus or Aphytos (Ἄφυτος), was an ancient Greek city in Pallene, the westernmost headland of Chalcidice. Around the middle of the 8th century BC colonists from Euboea arrived. The city became well known for its Temple of Dionysus, which appears to have been built in the second half of the 8th century BC. At Aphytis, Ammon was worshipped, at least from the time of the Spartan general Lysander, as zealously as in Ammonium, sanctuary in Libya. According to Pausanias, the patron of Aphytis, Ammon Zeus, appeared in a dream to Lysander and urged him to raise the siege, which he did. The Temple of Ammon Zeus, whose few remaining ruins date to the 4th century BC structure.

During archaic and classical times Aphytis was a prosperous city, minting its own coins, which depicted the head of its patron, Ammon Zeus, the city's economy appears to have been mainly based on farming and vine-culture. Aristotle (Politics V, VI 1319 a14) mentions the "agricultural law" of the Aphytians, a special, singular and interesting chapter in the history of ancient Greek public finances. The city became a member of the Chalkidian League; it previously paid tribute under the Thracian phoros of the Delian League.

During Hellenistic and Roman times the city minted coins again; an event possibly related to the fame of the Temple of Ammon Zeus. Strabo mentions Aphytis among the five cities, which existed in Pallene in the first century B.C. (Cassandreia, Aphytis, Mende, Scione and Sane). After the founding of the Roman colony of Cassandreia (43 BC), Aphytis was a vicus of this colony, dependent administratively on it.

Afytos is a village in the modern Kassandra peninsula.
