= Mecyberna =

Town of Chalcidice, ancient Macedonia

Coordinates: 40°16′42″N 23°23′46″E

Mecyberna or Mekyberna (Ancient Greek: Μηκύβερνα) was a town of Chalcidice, ancient Macedonia, which stood at the head of the Toronaic Gulf, which was also called Sinus Mecybernaeus. Mecyberna was the port of Olynthus. and lay between that town and Sermyle.

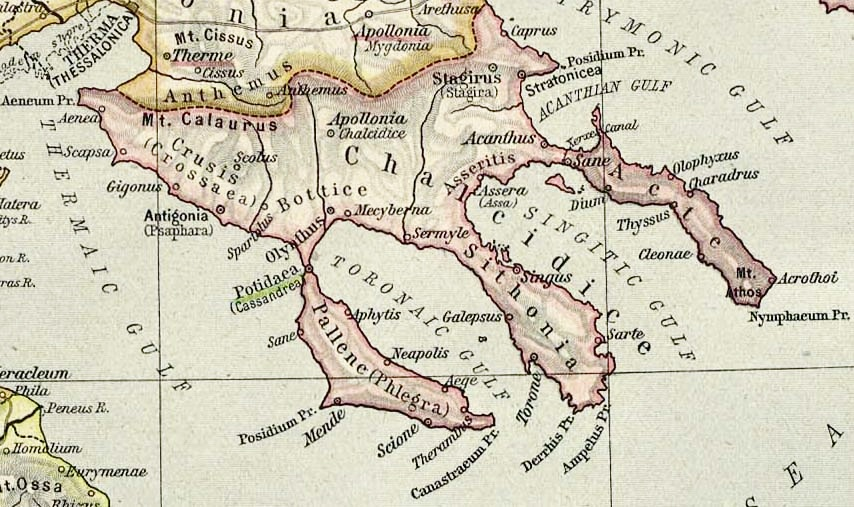

The town was a member of the Delian League, as its name appears in tribute lists from 454/3 to 433/2 BCE. It was taken from the Athenians by the Chalcidic Thracians (420 BCE), and surrendered to Philip II of Macedon before the siege of Olynthus (349 BCE).

The site of Mecyberna is near the modern Molyvopyrgos.
