= Kyrbissos =

Town of ancient Caria or of Ionia

Kyrbissos (Ancient Greek: Κυρβισσός) was a town of ancient Caria or of Ionia; the ethnonym was Κυρβισσεύς. It was a member of the Delian League since it appears in tribute records of Athens between the years 454/3 and 445/3 BCE paying a phoros of 2000 drachmae. It appears again in a tribute decree of Athens dated to 425/4 BCE. A treaty dated to the 3rd century BCE documents a sympoliteia between Kyrbissos and Teos such that Kyrbissos would be absorbed by Teos but would continue to exist and not be destroyed.

Its site is unlocated.
