= Argilus =

City of ancient Macedonia

Coordinates: 40°46′49″N 23°48′53″E

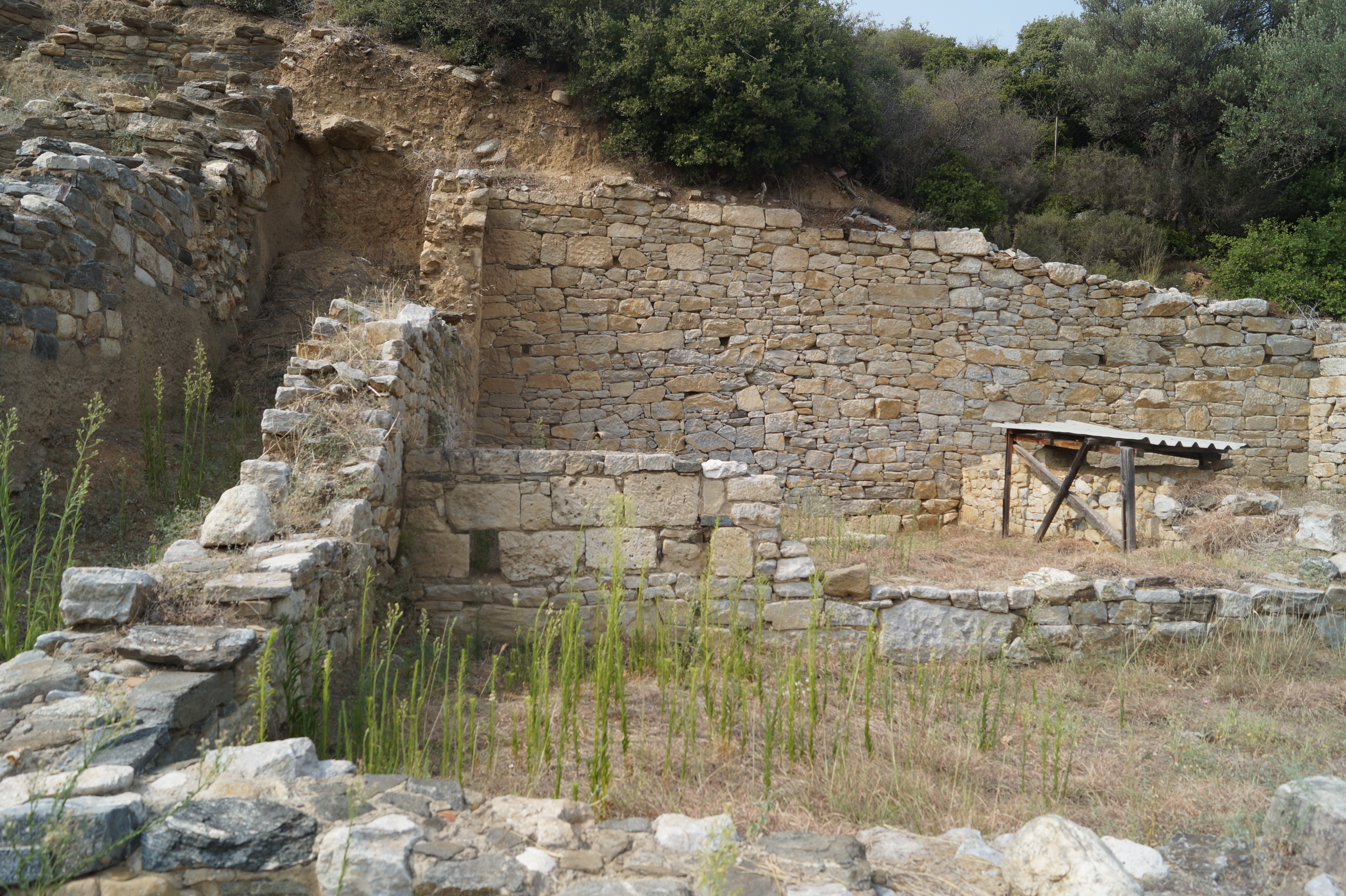
Ruins of Argilus

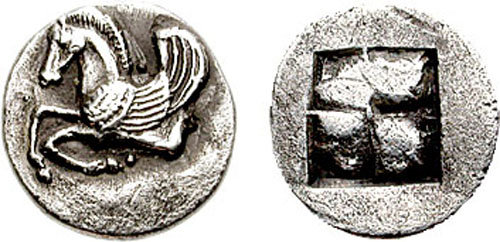
Coinage of Argilos, Macedon. Circa 510-480 BC.

Argilus or Argilos (Ancient Greek: Ἄργιλος) was a city of ancient Macedonia in the district Bisaltia, between Amphipolis and Bromiscus. It was founded by a colony from Andros. It appears from Herodotus to have been a little to the right of the route of the army of Xerxes I took in its invasion of Greece in the Greco-Persian Wars, and must therefore have been situated a little inland. Its territory must have been extended as far as the right bank of the Strymon, since Cerdylium, the mountain immediately opposite Amphipolis, belonged to Argilus. It was a member of the Delian League. During the Peloponnesian War, the Argilians readily joined the Spartan general Brasidas in his Chalcidian expedition in 424 BCE, on account of their jealousy of the important city of Amphipolis, which the Athenians had founded in their neighbourhood. The treaty establishing the Peace of Nicias, in 421 BCE, respected the neutrality of Argilus, Stageirus, Acanthus, Olynthus, Scolus, and Spartolus.

Its site is located 2 miles (3.2 km) southwest of Nea Kerdylia.
