= Tymnessus =

Town of ancient Caria

Tymnessus or Tymnessos (Ancient Greek: Τυμνησσός, Τυμνισσός, Τυμνησοῦ or Τυμνισσοῦ) was a town of ancient Caria, near the frontier with Lycia.

Its site is unlocated.
