= Tragilus =

Town in ancient Macedonia

Coordinates: 40°50′35″N 23°43′30″E

Tragilus or Tragilos (Ancient Greek: Τράγιλος), also known as Traelus or Trailos (Τράϊλος), or Tragila (Τράγιλα), was a town of Bisaltia, in ancient Macedonia. Tragilus is mentioned by Stephanus of Byzantium, as well as by epigraphic sources. It belonged to the Delian League since it appears in the Athens tribute register of 422/1 BCE. Tragilus's coins from the 5th century BCE, with the inscription «ΤΡΑΙ» or «ΤΡΑΙΛΙΟΝ», are also preserved. In addition, it is documented in the theorodokos list of Epidaurus of the year 360/59 BCE. William Smith states that this town is doubtless the same as Βράγιλος or Δράγιλος found in Hierocles among the towns of the first or consular Macedonia. In the Peutinger Table there is a place "Triulo" marked as 10 miles from Philippi, which is apparently a corruption of the name form "Traelio" similar to the coin inscriptions «ΤΡΑΙΛΙΟΝ».

It was the place of origin of Asclepiades of Tragilus, a mythographer of the fourth century BCE.

Its site is located near modern Aidonochori.
