= Dicaea (Macedonia) =

Coordinates: 40°27′38″N 22°56′50″E

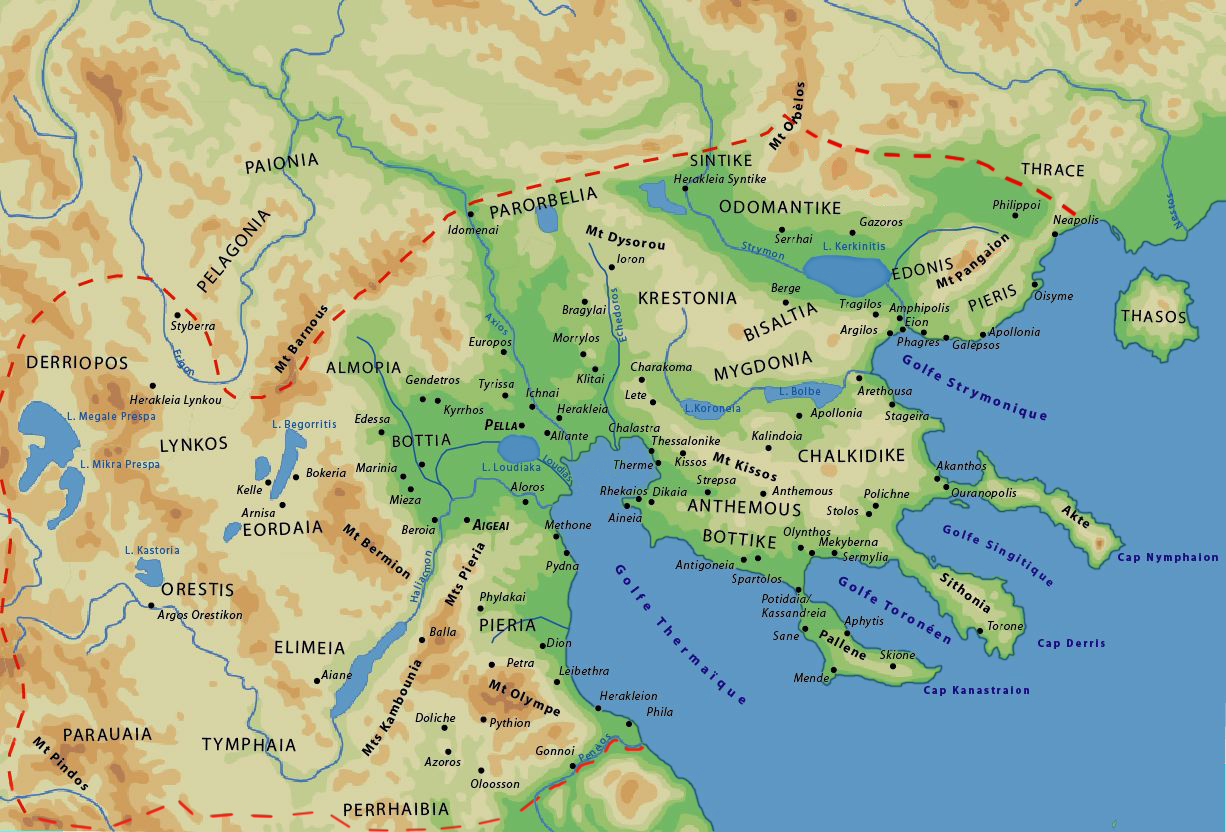
Macedonia and the Chalcidice

Dicaea or Dikaia (Ancient Greek: Δικαία or Δίκαια) was an ancient Greek city in northwest Chalcidice. It was an Eretrian colony as seen from the Athenian tribute lists.

The site of Dicaea is located at Nea Kallikrateia, near modern Epanome.

== See also ==
- List of ancient Greek cities
