= David Moore Robinson =

American classical archaeologist (1880– 1958)

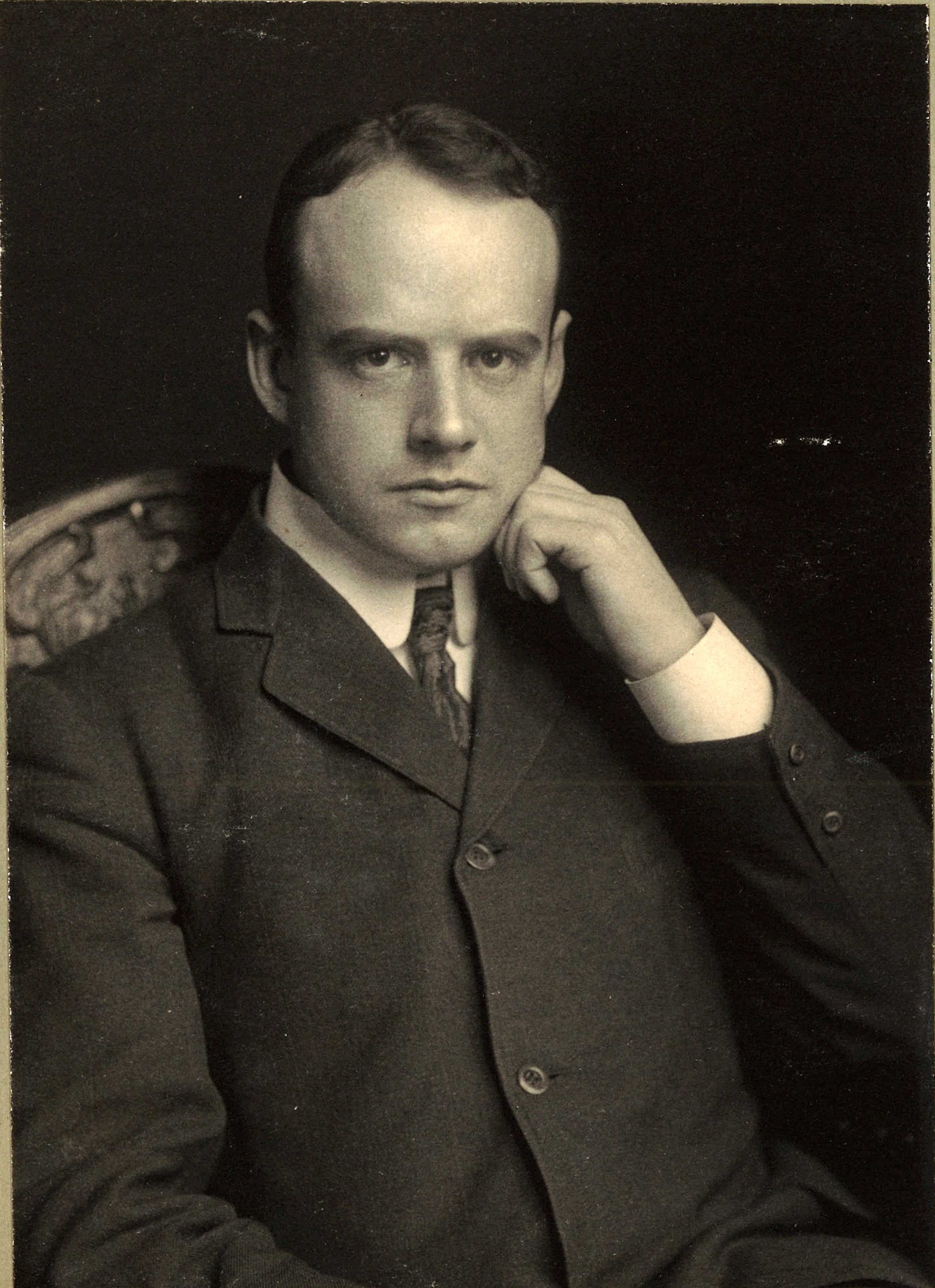
- Robinson in 1909
- Born: September 21, 1880; Auburn, New York
- Died: January 2, 1958 (aged 77); Oxford, Mississippi
- Occupation: Classical archaeologist
- Years active: 1904-1958
- Known for: Excavations at Olynthus
- Spouse: Helen Haskell

David Moore Robinson (September 21, 1880, in Auburn, New York – January 2, 1958, in Oxford, Mississippi) was an American classical archaeologist credited with the discovery of the ancient city of Olynthus. While he was a prolific writer and advisor, he also has gained notoriety due to his plagiarism of his students, the most notable being Mary Ross Ellingson.

== Biography ==
Robinson earned his A.B. (1898) and Ph.D. (1904) at the University of Chicago. Robinson served on the faculty of Johns Hopkins University (1905-1947). After his retirement, which also marked a falling out with Johns Hopkins, he moved to the Department of Classics at the University of Mississippi in Oxford, Mississippi. Many ancient objects from Robinson's collection were donated to the University of Mississippi and now constitute the David M. Robinson Memorial Collection of Greek and Roman Antiquities. His collection of papyri and manuscripts were given in his will to colleague William Hailey Willis.

In addition to the excavations at Olynthus, he participated in archaeological excavations at ancient Corinth (1902) and Sardis (1910), as well as Pisidian Antioch (1924).

Among his students (he is credited with training 75 Ph.D. recipients and 41 M.A. recipients) were George M.A. Hanfmann, Eunice B. Stebbins, Allan Chester Johnson, George E. Mylonas, Paul Augustus Clement, Jr., James Walter Graham, Mary Ross Ellingson, Helen Henrietta Tanzer, and William Andrew McDonald.

Robinson was elected to the American Academy of Arts and Sciences in 1934 and the American Philosophical Society in 1936. He was awarded the Cross of the Royal Order of the Phoenix by King Paul of Greece in 1957.

== Plagiarism ==
Robinson published his findings at Olynthus in a 14-volume series, Excavations at Olynthus, most of which he wrote himself. However, it has since been proved that he plagiarized the work of his student Mary Ross Ellingson, and he has been accused of plagiarizing at least three other students as well. It has been shown that he published Ellingson's master's thesis and doctoral dissertation in volumes VII and XIV of Excavations at Olynthus as his own work.

== Publications ==
- 1904. Ancient Sinopea. University of Chicago (dissertation).
- 1924. Sappho & Her Influence on Ancient and Modern Literature
- 1930. with C. G. Harcum and J. H. Iliffe. A Catalogue of the Greek Vases in the Royal Ontario Museum of Archaeology, Toronto. Toronto: The University of Toronto Press.
- 1929-1952. David M Robinson; George E Mylonas. Excavations at Olynthus. (Johns Hopkins University studies in archaeology, no. 6, 9, 11-12, 18-20, 25-26, 31-32, 36, 38-39.) 14 v. Baltimore: Johns Hopkins University Press.
- 1934-1938. with S. E. Freeman and M. McGehee. The Robinson Collection, Baltimore, Md.(Corpus Vasorum Antiquorum. United States of America fasc. 4, 6-7.) Cambridge, MA: Harvard University Press.
- 1951-1953. George E. Mylonas; David M. Robinson; Doris Raymond. Studies presented to David Moore Robinson on his seventieth birthday. 2 v. Saint Louis: Washington University.
