= Telandrus =

Town on Telandria island in ancient Caria

Coordinates: 36°40′28″N 28°54′57″E

Telandrus or Telandros (Ancient Greek: Τήλανδρος) and Telandron (Ancient Greek: Τήλανδρον) and Telandreia/Telandria (Ancient Greek: Τηλάνδρεια), also known as Telandros akre (Ancient Greek: Τηλανδρία ἄκρα) was a town on Telandria island in ancient Caria. It was a polis (city-state), and a member of the Delian League since it appears in tribute records of Athens between the years 453/2 and 433/2 BCE.

Pliny the Elder mentions Telandria (modern Tersane) as an island from which the population had disappeared. However, Quintus Smyrnaeus notes Telandrus as the name of a valley near the Glaucus River, so called because it was the place where tradition indicated that the mythical Glaucus of Lycia (of Trojan War fame) was buried. It has been suggested that the site may be at Tersane or Avthoki or at Nif Köy in the interior of Caria.
