= Cyllandus =

City of ancient Caria

Coordinates: 37°04′04″N 28°26′32″E

Cyllandus or Kyllandos (Ancient Greek: Κύλλανδος) was a city of ancient Caria mentioned by Stephanus of Byzantium. It was a polis (city-state) and a member of the Delian League.

Its site is located near Elmalı, Asiatic Turkey.
