= Damastes of Sigeum =

Ancient Greek historian

Damastes of Sigeum (Ancient Greek: Δαμάστης) was a Greek geographer and historian in the 5th century BC from Sigeum.

He was probably a pupil of Hellanicus of Lesbos. With the exception of a few fragments, his works did not survive.

Suda wrote that he had many works including the:

- Events in Greece
- On the Children and Ancestors of those who took part in the Expedition to Troy (also ascribed by some sources to Polus of Acragas)
- Gazetteer of Peoples and Cities
- On Poets and Sophists

He is mentioned in Dionysius of Halicarnassus work Roman Antiquities.
