= Scolus (Chalcidice) =

Scolus or Skolos (Ancient Greek: Σκῶλος) was a town of ancient Chalcidice near Olynthus, mentioned together with Argilus, Stageirus, Acanthus, Olynthus, Spartolus, in the treaty (Peace of Nicias) between Athens and Sparta in the tenth year of the Peloponnesian War, in 421 BCE, leaving the town neutral. It is considered by some to be the same as the town called Stolus or Stolos (Στῶλος).

Without identification with Stolus, its site is unlocated.
