= Chalcetor =

Town of ancient Caria

Coordinates: 37°20′57″N 27°41′09″E

Chalcetor or Chalketor (Ancient Greek: Χαλκήτωρ) was a town of ancient Caria. Strabo says that the mountain range of Grion is parallel to Latmus, and extends east from the Milesia through Caria to Euromus and the Chalcetores, that is, the people of Chalcetor. In another passage, Strabo names the town Chalcetor, which some writers have erroneously altered to Chalcetora. It was a member of the Delian League. The city united in the 2d century BC with Euromus, and later in a sympolity with Mylasa.

In the city there was a temple of Apollo. Archaeologists have found tombs, sarcophagi, inscriptions and other findings.

Its site is located near Karakuyu, Muğla Province, in Asiatic Turkey.
