= Stolus =

Coordinates: 40°22′09″N 23°39′53″E

Stolus or Stolos (Ancient Greek: Στῶλος), was a town of Chalcidice, in ancient Macedonia.

Stolus was a member of the Delian League; its name appears on tribute lists from 454/3 to 434/3 BCE. It is considered by some to be the same as the town called Scolus; and by others to be the same as Polichnitai.

The site of Stolus is near the modern Plana.
