= Amynanda =

Town of ancient Caria

Coordinates: 37°00′08″N 27°38′46″E

Amynanda (Ancient Greek: Ἀμύνανδα) was a town of ancient Caria. Amynanda appears in the Athenian tribute lists and paid an annual tribute of 50 drachmae, 5 obol.

Its site is located near Alakilise, Asiatic Turkey.
