= Bolbae =

Ancient Greek city

Bolbae or Bolbai (Ancient Greek: Βόλβαι) was a town of ancient Caria, mentioned by Stephanus of Byzantium. Bolbae was a polis (city-state) and member of the Delian League. It appears in the Athenian tribute lists and paid an annual tribute of 17 drachmae, 1 obol.

Its site is unlocated.
