= Erines =

Town of ancient Caria

Erines (Ancient Greek: Ἐρινε͂ς) or Erine (Ἐρινε͂) was a town of ancient Caria, probably on the Bodrum Peninsula. Erines appears in the Athenian tribute lists and paid an annual tribute of 68 drachmae, 5 obol. It also appears on numerous ancient inscriptions.

The editors of the Barrington Atlas of the Greek and Roman World treat it as unlocated but probably near Theangela. Others locate its site near Hisarönü, Asiatic Turkey, at the head of the gulf opposite the Greek island of Syme.
