= Brycus =

Coordinates: 35°47′56″N 27°09′58″E

Brycus or Brykous (Ancient Greek: Βρυκοῦς) was a town of ancient Greece on the island of Karpathos. It was a member of the Delian League.

Its site is located near modern Ag. Marina, Avlona.

The site’s earliest explorers include Theodore and Mabel Bent who excavated here in the spring of 1885; many of their finds are in the British Museum.
