= Sermylia =

Former town in ancient Macedonia

Coordinates: 40°17′54″N 23°32′23″E

Sermylia (Ancient Greek: Σερμυλία), or Sermyle (Σερμύλη), was a town of Chalcidice, between Galepsus and Mecyberna. The town gave its name to the Toronaic Gulf, which was also called Sermylicus Sinus (κόλπος Σερμυλικός - kolpos Sermylikos). Pseudo Scylax writes that it was a Greek city. It was a member of the Delian League.

The site of Sermylia is near the modern Ormylia.
