= Poseidium =

Coordinates: 38°58′21″N 23°22′00″E

Poseidium or Poseidion (Ancient Greek: Ποσείδιον) was a town on the northeast coast of ancient Euboea. It belonged to the Delian League since it appears in the taxation registry of Athens of the year 425/4 BCE, where it had to pay a phoros of 100 drachmae. In the 2nd century BCE, Poseidium appears in another inscription where it had become a deme of Oreus.

Its site is located near the Palaiokastro ("old fort/castle") of Vasilika.
