= Sigeion =

Ancient Greek city at the southern entrance of the Hellespont

- Σίγειον (Ancient Greek); Sigeum (Latin)
- Location within Turkey
- 39°59′24″N 26°10′50″E
- Type: Settlement
- Periods: Archaic Greece to Hellenistic period
- Location: Kumkale, Çanakkale Province, Turkey
- Region: Troad

History
- Built: 8th or 7th century BC
- Built by: Colonists from Mytilene
- Abandoned: Between 168 BC and 23 AD

Sigeion (Ancient Greek: Σίγειον, Sigeion; Latin: Sigeum) was an ancient Greek city in the north-west of the Troad region of Anatolia located at the mouth of the Scamander (the modern Karamenderes River). Sigeion commanded a ridge between the Aegean Sea and the Scamander which is now known as Yenişehir and is a part of the Çanakkale district in Çanakkale province, Turkey. The surrounding region was referred to as the Sigean Promonotory, which was frequently used as a point of reference by ancient geographers since it marked the mouth of the Hellespont. The outline of this promontory is no longer visible due to the alluvial activity of the Karamenderes which has filled in the embayment east of Yenişehir. The name 'Sigeion' means 'silent place' and is derived from Ancient Greek σιγή (sigē), 'silence'; in Classical Antiquity, the name was assumed to be antiphrastic, i.e. indicating a characteristic of the place contrary to reality, since the seas in this region are known for their fierce storms.

== History ==
=== Archaic ===
Sigeion was founded by the Mytilenaeans from nearby Lesbos in the 8th or 7th century BC. Towards the end of the 7th century BC, the Athenians sent the Olympic victor Phrynon to conquer Sigeion. According to tradition, Phrynon and the Mytilenaean aristocrat Pittacus fought a duel in which Pittacus won by outwitting his opponent by using a net. During this war the aristocrat and poet Alcaeus of Mytilene wrote several poems about the conflict in which he related how he had fled from battle, lost his shield, and endured the shame of the Athenians hanging it up as a trophy in their temple to Athena. Most of these poems are lost except for a few lines, and it is thought that they constituted the major source of information about the conflict for writers in Classical Antiquity.

The Athenians appealed to the Corinthian tyrant Periander to arbitrate between the two sides as to who should rightfully control Sigeion. Periander found in favour of Athens, accepting their argument that whereas they had taken part in the Trojan Wars and helped destroy nearby Ilion, the Mytilenaeans were Aeolians and so had only arrived in the region at a later date and therefore did not have the prior claim to the land. Two inscriptions written in Attic Greek, dating to c. 575-550 BC, and attributed to Sigeion indicate that Athenians continued to live at Sigeion for the next half century. Archaeological remains at the Mytilenaean fort of Achilleion 7–8 km south of Sigeion indicate that throughout this period the Mytilenaeans maintained a hostile presence nearby, and in the 540s this resulted in Mytilene's recapture of Sigeion. The Athenian tyrant Peisistratus responded by recapturing Sigeion and making his illegitimate son Hegesistratus tyrant of the city. Sigeion remained important to the Peisistratids. After Peisistratos' son, Hippias, was banished from Athens in 510/9 BC, he spent his exile at Sigeion and minted coins which displayed the Athenian symbol of the owl and his own name as the legend.

=== Classical ===
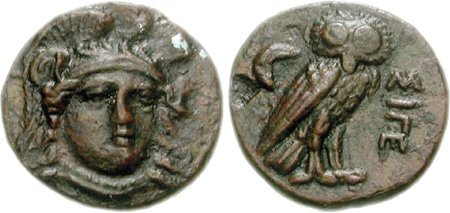
Coinage of Sigeion. Circa 355-334 BC

Sigeion maintained close relations with Athens throughout the Classical period. The Sigeans were loyal allies whom we find praised by the Athenians in an inscription from either 451/0 and 418/17 BC, and throughout the 5th century Sigeion was a member of the Athenian run Delian League. In the tribute assessments Sigeion belonged to the Hellespontine District, and in the tribute lists which survive Sigeion appears a total of 15 times between 450/49 and 418/17 BC; at the beginning of this period its tribute was a modest 1,000 drachmas, but by the end its tribute assessment had risen to 1 talent. According to the contemporary historian Theopompus of Chios, Sigeion was the favourite residence of the Athenian general Chares, who spent time there in the late 340s and late 330s BC. The 4th century BC coinage of Sigeion may belong to the period of his rule (335-334 BC). Continuing links with Athens, indicated by Chares' relationship with Sigeion, are also evident from the iconography of this coinage, which displayed a head of Athena on the obverse and an owl on the reverse. At some point in the 4th century BC (Aristotle simply says ἔναγχος, 'recently'), Sigeion became embroiled in a land dispute with the nearby island of Tenedos to the south, although we know no further details.

Damastes of Sigeum was a famous Greek geographer and historian of the 5th century BC.

=== Hellenistic and Roman ===
In 302 BC King Lysimachus took Sigeion by force when it refused to come over willingly from the side of Antigonus I Monophthalmus. In 168 BC Sigeion sheltered the Macedonian fleet of Antigonus' descendant Perseus of Macedon. At some point after this, Sigeion was abandoned: in the latter part of Augustus' reign, the geographer Strabo described Sigeion as κατεσπασμένη πόλις, 'a city which has been torn down', and in the mid 1st century AD both Pomponius Mela and Pliny the Elder likewise referred to Sigeion as abandoned. However, references in later sources indicate that the promontory continued to be known as 'Sigeion' for many centuries to come.

== Bibliography ==
- J.M. Cook, The Troad (Oxford, 1973).
- J.V. Luce, 'The Homeric topography of the Trojan Plain reconsidered' OJA 3 (1984) 31–43.
- M. Korfmann, 'Beşik-Tepe. Vorbericht über die Ergebnisse der Granungen von 1985 und 1986' Archäologische Anzeiger (1988) 391–8.
- A.U. Kossatz, 'Beşik-Tepe 1985 und 1986; zur archaischen Keramik vom Beşik-Tepe' Archäologische Anzeiger (1988) 398–404.
- L.H. Jeffery, The Local Scripts of Archaic Greece Rev. ed. (Oxford, 1990).
- S. Mitchell, 'Sigeion' in M.H. Hansen and T.H. Nielsen (eds.), An Inventory of Archaic and Classical Poleis (Oxford, 2004) no. 791.
