= Pigres of Caria =

Pigres of Caria the son of Seldomus, was a distinguished naval commander in the army of Xerxes I of Persia.
