= Poseidium (Karpathos) =

Coordinates: 35°30′32″N 27°13′01″E

Poseidium or Poseidion (Ancient Greek: Ποσείδιον), also known as Potidaeum or Potidaion or Karpathou Ktoina, was a town of ancient Greece on the island of Karpathos, and served as the harbour of Karpathos.

Its site is located near modern Pigadia i.e. Karpathos Town.
