= Birytis =

Town in ancient Troad

Coordinates: 39°57′00″N 26°24′40″E

Birytis (Βίρυτις) or Berytis (Βέρυτις) or Berythis (Βήριθος) was a town in ancient Troad. It is believed, although there is no absolute security, that the inhabitants of this city of the Troad are the same that, with the name of Berysioi (Βερύσιοι), belonged to the Delian League since they appear in the tribute records of Athens between the years 454/3 and 446/5 BCE where they paid a phoros of 1000 drachmae, as well as in a tribute decree of Athens of 425/4 BCE. Silver and bronze coins struck with the legend «ΒΙΡΥ» dated to the 4th and 3rd centuries BCE are attributed to Birytis.

Its site is tentatively located near Mersinoba, Asiatic Turkey.
