= Sane (Pallene) =

Ancient city in Chalcidice, Greece

Coordinates: 40°05′32″N 23°18′39″E

Sane (Greek: Σάνη) was an ancient Greek city in Pallene headland of Chalcidice. It is located between Mende and Potidaea. The city was a member of the Delian League. It is mentioned by Herodotus in connection with the march of Xerxes I in Thrace.
