= Olynthus =

Ancient Greek city

- Ὀλυνθος (Greek)
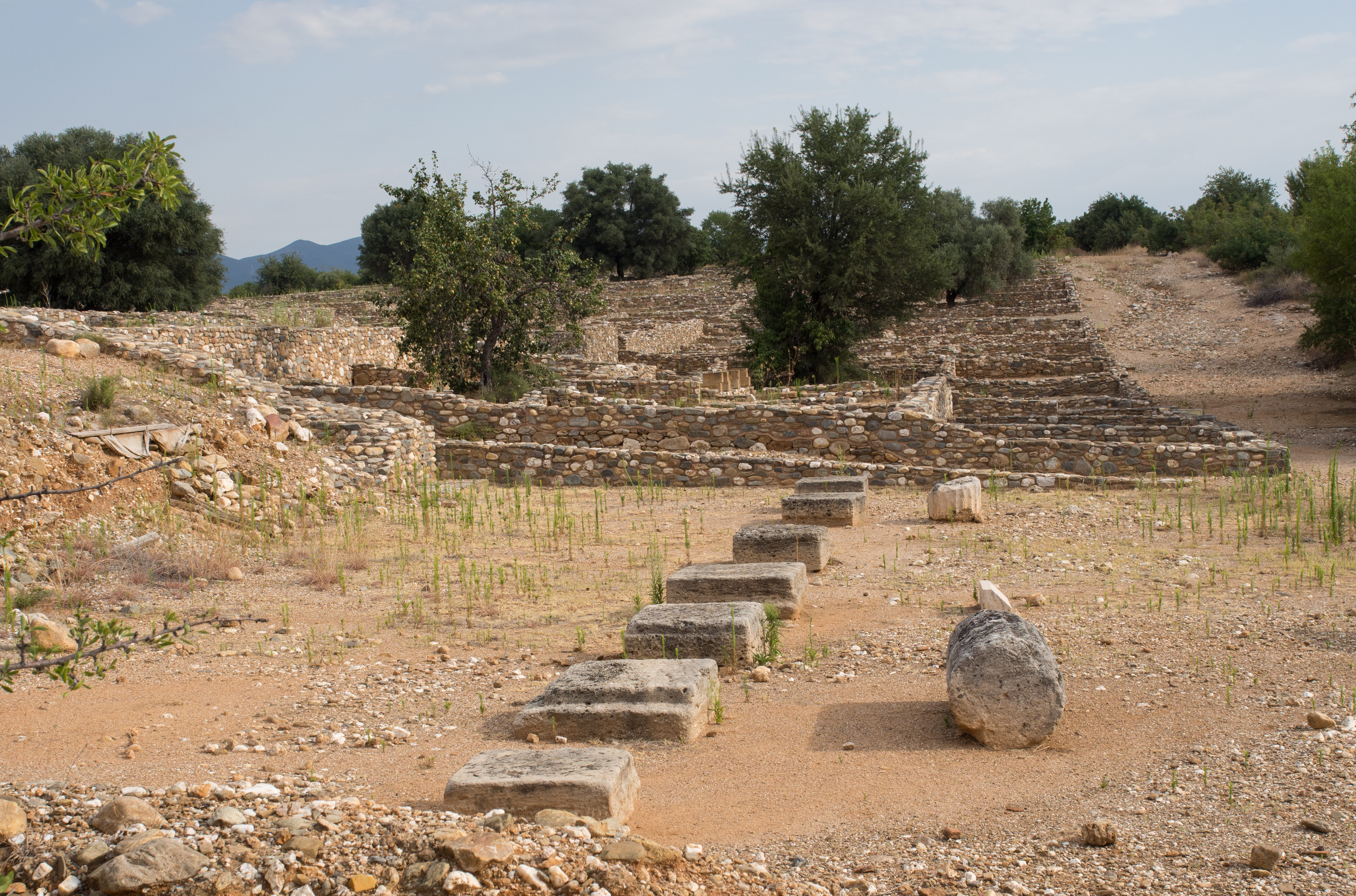
- Bouleuterion of ancient Olynthus

- Location within Greece Location within Mediterranean
- 40.296°N 23.354°E
- Type: Settlement
- Location: Olynthus, Central Macedonia, Greece
- Part of: Chalcidian League

History
- Built: 7th century BC
- Abandoned: 318 BC

Site notes
- Length: 1500
- Width: 400
- Area: 60 ha (150 acres)
- Archaeologists: David Moore Robinson, Mary Ross Ellingson
- Condition: Ruined
- Owner: Public
- Management: 16th Ephorate of Prehistoric and Classical Antiquities
- Public access: Yes
- Website: Hellenic Ministry of Culture and Tourism

Olynthus (Ancient Greek: Ὄλυνθος Olynthos) is an ancient city in present-day Chalcidice, Greece. It was built mostly on two flat-topped hills 30–40m in height, in a fertile plain at the head of the Gulf of Torone, near the neck of the peninsula of Pallene, about 2.5 kilometers from the sea, and about 60 stadia (c. 9–10 kilometers) from Poteidaea.

Olynthus served as head of the Chalcidian League from its inception just before the Peloponnesian War to the time the city was destroyed in the Social War. The city flourished between 432 BCE and its destruction by Philip II of Macedon in 348 BCE. It was finally abandoned in 316 BCE. Excavations were conducted across four seasons, spanning from 1928 to 1938. Artefacts found during the excavations of the site are exhibited in the Archaeological Museum of Olynthos.In the modern day the city is famous for its well preserved household and urban architecture. ^{pg.viii}

The city was named for Olynthus, the son of Heracles or of Strymon, the mythological founder of the town.

== History ==
=== Neolithic ===
The Neolithic settlement was founded in the 4th millennium BCE and thrived from 3000 to 2900 BCE. ^{pg.96} There are no written records from this period but much can be surmised from the archaeological evidence found at the site. The people living in Olynthus at the time were an agricultural society who farmed crops and had domestic animals. They produced pottery, tools made of stone and bone, and stone jewelry. The settlement was invaded and no evidence of resettlement thereafter has been found. ^{pg.96}

=== Archaic ===
After its abandonment in the Neolithic era, Olynthus was resettled in the 7th century BC. Subsequently, the town was captured by the Bottiaeans, a Thracian tribe ejected from Macedon by Alexander I.

The Persian army spent the winter of 479 BCE in Thessaly and Macedonia following the Persian defeat at Salamis and Xerxes' retreat to the Hellespont with his general Artabazus. ^{pg.139} The Persian authority in the Balkans had lessened, encouraging the inhabitants of the Pallene peninsula to break away. Suspecting that a revolt against the Great King was brewing, Artabazus captured Olynthus, whom he thought to be disloyal, and killed a large number of the Bottiaeans living there. ^{pg.34} ^{pg.139}The city was then given to Critobolos of Toroni by Artabazus and fresh population consisting of Greeks from the neighboring region of Chalcidice, who had been exiled by the Macedonians moved in. ^{pg.34}

=== Classical ===
Olynthus appears as a Greek polis in the quota-lists of the Delian League. It appears smaller than other Chalcidian cities at the time as it was responsible for paying only 2 talents in 438 BCE, compared to the nearby city of Scione, who contributed 15 talents in the same year.

In 432 BCE King Perdiccas II of Macedon encouraged several nearby coastal towns (including, but likely not limited to, Mecyberna, Singus, and Gale ^{pg.36}) to disband and move their populations to Olynthus, in preparation for a revolt led by Potidaea against Athens. ^{pg.147} This synoecism (συνοικισμός) was effected, though against Perdiccas' wishes the contributing cities were not completely abandoned. ^{pg.36} The synoecism led to a major increase in population leading to the settlement of the North Hill. ^{pg.38}

In 432 BCE Olynthus became the head of a formal Chalcidian League, occasioned by the synoecism or by the beginning of the Peloponnesian War and fear of Athenian attack. During the Peloponnesian war it formed a base for Brasidas in his expedition of 424 BCE and refuge for the citizens of Mende and Poteidaea that had rebelled against the Athenians (Thu. ii, 70). After the end of the Peloponnesian War the development of the league was rapid and ended consisting of 32 cities. In about 393 BCE Olynthus concluded an important treaty with Amyntas III of Macedon, and by 382 BCE it had absorbed most of the Greek cities west of the Strymon, and had even got possession of Pella, the chief city in Macedon. (Xenophon, Hell. V. 2, 12).

To the end of the 380s the relationship between Macedonia and Olynthus soured. Amyntas III wished for the Olynthians to return the land he had given them and the Olynthians did not comply. Amyntas declared war and called on his ally Sparta for help. Sparta was induced by an embassy from Acanthus and Apollonia, which anticipated conquest by the league, to send an expedition against Olynthus, which they did in 382 BCE. After three years of indecisive warfare Olynthus consented to dissolve the confederacy in 379. ^{pgs.159-160} It is clear, however, that the dissolution was little more than formal, as the Chalcidians ("Χαλκιδῆς ἀπò Θρᾴκης") appear, only a year or two later, among the members of the Athenian naval confederacy of 378–377 BCE.

=== Destruction by Philip II ===
When the Social War broke out between Athens and its allies in 357 BCE, Olynthus was originally in an alliance with Philip. Subsequently, in alarm at the growth of his power, it concluded an alliance with Athens. Olynthus made three embassies to Athens, the occasions of Demosthenes's three Olynthiac Orations. On the third, the Athenians sent soldiers from among its citizens. After Philip had deprived Olynthus of the rest of the League, by force and by the treachery of sympathetic factions, he besieged Olynthus in 348 BCE. The siege was short; he bought Olynthus's two principal citizens, Euthycrates and Lasthenes, who betrayed the city to him. He then looted and razed the city and sold its population—including the Athenian garrison—into slavery. Only a small area of the North Hill was ever re-occupied, up to 316 BCE, before Cassander forced the population to move in his new city of Cassandreia. ^{pgs.49-52}

Despite the abandonment of the city, there are records of men in later centuries scattered through the Hellenistic world who were called Olynthians. ^{pg.52}

== Site topography ==
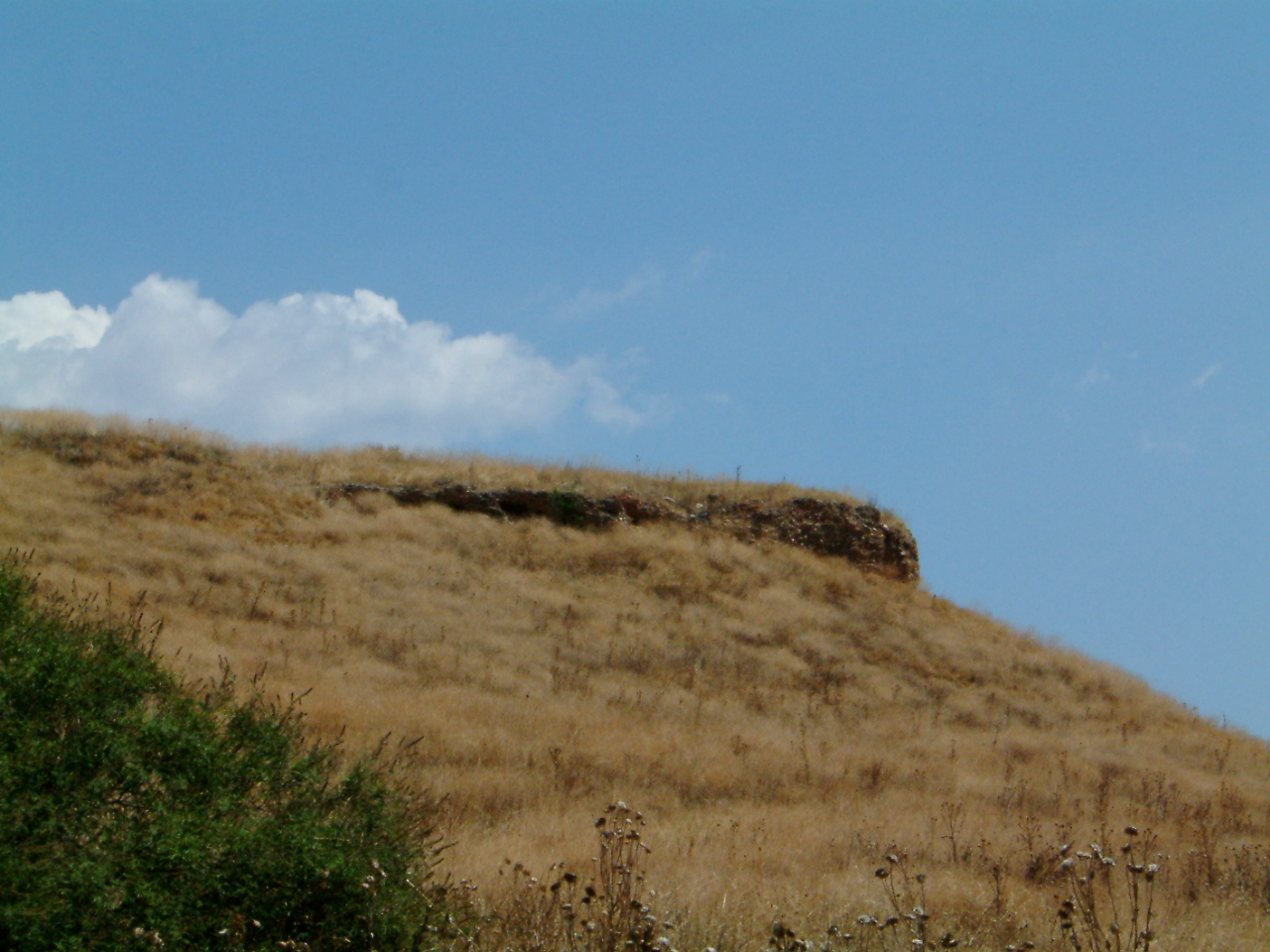
Remains of the Neolithic settlement on the South Hill at Olynthus, as seen from the nearby river Resetnikia

=== Neolithic ===
The Neolithic settlement is located in the edge of the South Hill. It was founded in the 4th millennium BCE and thrived between 3000 and 2900. Only 5 houses were found, belonging to three different stages of the Neolithic settlement. The foundations of walls were all that remained of these houses and were made of mud and river stones.

The pottery that was found was the typical of that period, consisting of mostly of monochrome pieces, with some incised and painted pieces. The Neolithic settlement also contained the oldest potters kiln to be discovered in Greece.

=== Archaic ===
The Archaic city was built under a provincially urban plan and extended throughout the whole South Hill. Two avenues were revealed along the eastern and western edges of the hill that intersected with crossing streets, two of which were excavated. Along the south avenue shops and small houses were found while the administrative part was located in the north part of the hill, where the agora and a deanery were found.

Public buildings– including an assembly hall and two arsenals– and the agora were located at the north end of the hill. ^{pg.32}

=== Classical ===
The classical city can largely be separated into two sections: the North Hill and the Villa Section. These sections were established on the much larger North Hill and to its eastern slope.

Excavations on the North Hill uncovered 108 buildings, revealing a Hippodamian grid plan. Two large avenues were excavated, along with horizontal streets that divided the urban area into city blocks. Each block had ten houses (made up of two rows of five houses with an alley between them) which shared walls with each other. ^{pg.27} Each house followed the same basic "pastas" type, usually containing a courtyard, pastas, andron, and other indistinct rooms. Houses could also contain kitchen complexes and shops (rooms opening out to the street that were not necessarily used for retail). Many houses in Olynthus show signs of a second story. ^{pgs.78-82}

The North Hill also contained public buildings, the agora was placed in the south edge of the north hill, along with a public fountain, an arsenal and the city's parliament building (Βουλευτήριον). ^{pg.32}

Both the archaic and classical city were protected by an extended land wall. Parts of the foundations of the wall were revealed in the north hill and elsewhere. Part of the wall was found to make up the west walls of the houses of row A. Part of the city wall was found between the North Hill and most of the Villa Section. This combined with their slightly different orientation reveals them as being designed and constructed at a separate, later time. The houses in the Villa section do not tend to follow the housing template used on the North Hill as strictly, with empty plots between houses to allow for bigger houses or gardens. ^{pgs.29-30}

== Archaeology ==
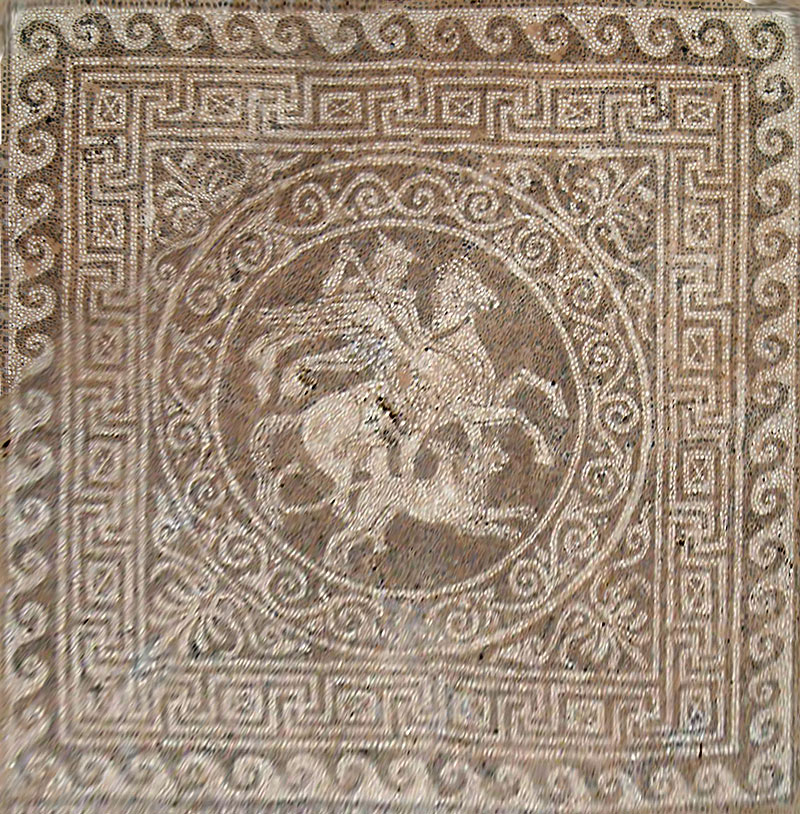
Olynthian floor mosaic from the andron of House A vi 3, depicting the mythical hero Bellerophon on Pegasus fighting the Chimera

Due to its proximity to the ancient city of Potidaea and the presence of some inscriptions, the British adventurer William Leake reasoned that the site of Olynthus was at the village of Agios Mamas, seven kilometers south of the actual location. This viewpoint was shared by a number of scholars, including Esprit-Marie Cousinéry, but was challenged in the early twentieth century by Adolf Struck and English archaeologist Alan Wace, among others. Wace in particular found no evidence of an ancient settlement at Agios Mamas, Leake had evidently not visited there himself, and that the inscriptions were taken from stones found at Potidaea by local residents. Utilizing descriptions provided by Thucydides and Xenophon, he reasoned that Olynthus must actually lie further north near the village of Myriophyton. In 1915, Wace conducted a preliminary survey of the area in hopes that the British School of Athens might pursue an excavation, but nothing came of it.

On February 17, 1928, David Moore Robinson and a large team of archaeologists and workmen began excavations at Olynthus in collaboration with the American School of Classical Studies in Athens. They found that the ancient city extends over two hills that detach from a small coulee and possess an area ca. 1500 m long and 400 m in width. Robinson conducted three additional excavations in 1931, 1934, and 1938, publishing the results in fourteen volumes. Some of his writing was later found to have been plagiarized from another excavator, Mary Ross Ellingson. The excavation had uncovered more than five hectares of Olynthus and a portion of Mecyberna (the harbor of Olynthus). On the North Hill this hurried pace proved relatively harmless due to the simple stratigraphy of an area of the city occupied only for 84 years and subjected to a sudden, final destruction; but the data from the South Hill was badly muddled. Nonetheless, the work was excellent for its time, and remains supremely valuable. Much of the stratigraphy of the North Hill has been reconstructed by Nicholas Cahill (University of Wisconsin). The site is now in the charge of Julia Vokotopoulou, and the XVI Ephorate of Classical Antiquities.

== Notable people ==
- Callisthenes (c. 360–328 BC), historian
- Ephippus (4th century BC), historian
- Euphantus (4th century BC), philosopher
- Sthennis (4th century BC), sculptor

== Modern Olynthos ==
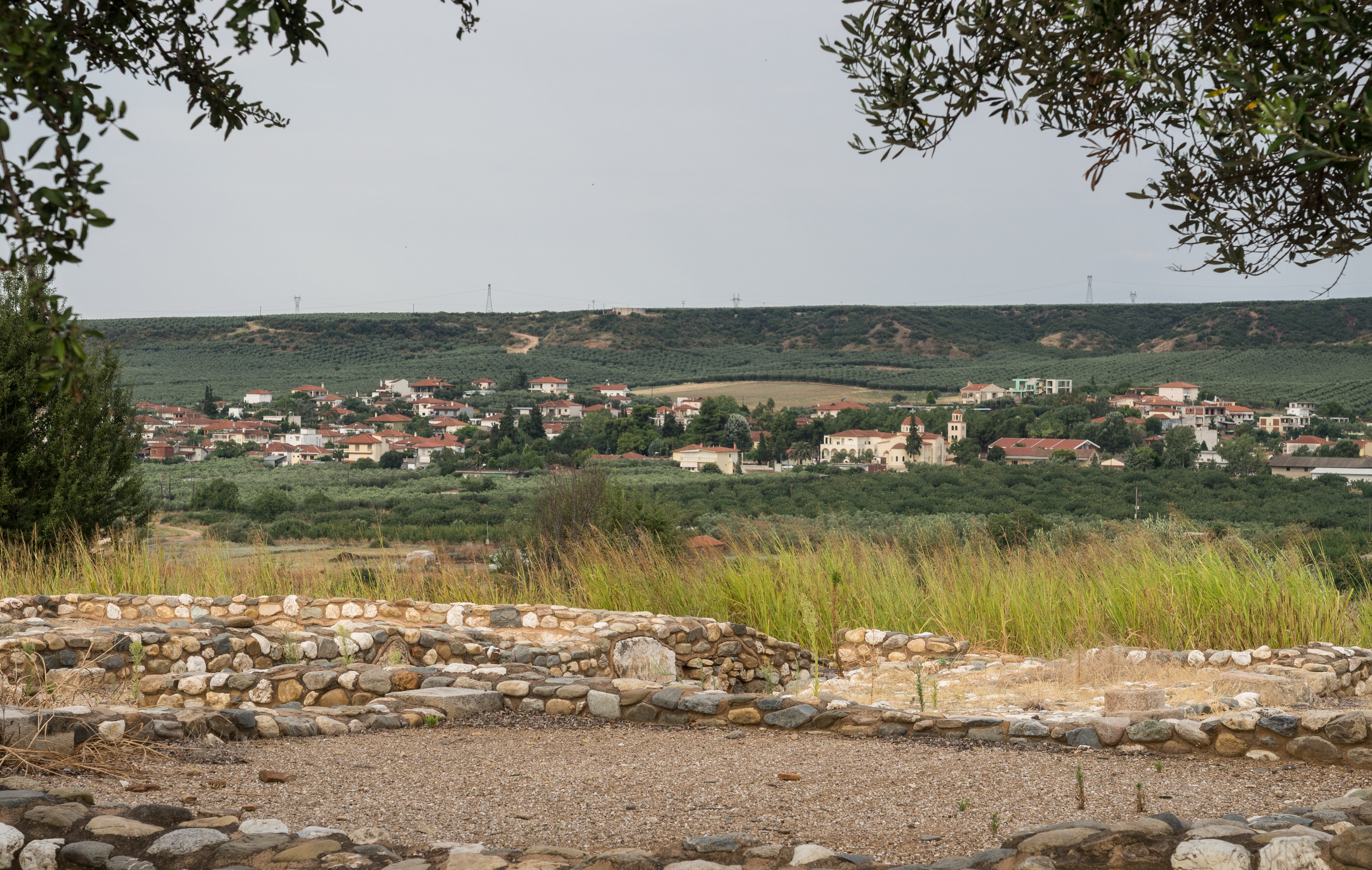
A view of the modern city of Nea Olynthus as seen from the ruins of ancient Olynthus

In the Byzantine and Ottoman periods the town had shrunk considerably and became known as Myriophyto.

In the 1920s many Greek refugees from Eastern Thrace and Asia Minor were resettled in the town, joining the small local population, and the town became known as Nea Olynthos.

The town sits on a small plateau on the western side of the river Olynthios or Resetenikia (in ancient times known as Sandanus), across from the ruins of the ancient city.

Artifacts found during the excavations of the site are exhibited in the Archaeological Museum of Olynthos. The archaeological site is open to the public during daylight hours.

== See also ==
- List of ancient Greek cities

== Notes ==
- Liddell & Scott, Greek-English Lexicon. (1889/1996). Oxford: Clarendon Press. {{ISSGN>}}
- George Grote, A History of Greece, London, 1862. 74–108.
- Charles Rollin, Ancient History. (1844) Philadelphia: John B. Perry.
- Nicholas Cahill, Household and City Organization at Olynthus; Olynthus at Perseus
- Raymond Dessy, Exile from Olynthus.
- David M Robinson; George E Mylonas (1929–1952). "Excavations at Olynthus". (Johns Hopkins University Studies in Archaeology, no. 6, 9, 11–12, 18–20, 25–26, 31–32, 36, 38–39.) 14 v. Baltimore: Johns Hopkins University Press. WorldCat
- Zahrnt, Michael (1971). Olynth und die Chalkidier. Untersuchungen zur Staatenbildung auf der Chalkidikischen Halbinsel im 5. und 4. Jahrhundert v. Chr. [Olynthus and the Chalcidians. Studies on state formation on the Chalcidice peninsula in the 5th and 4th centuries BC.] Vestigia, vol. 14. Munich: Beck, ISBN 3-406-03097-1.
