= Dium (Chalcidice) =

Coordinates: 40°21′21″N 24°09′50″E

Dium or Dion (Ancient Greek: Δῖον) was a city on the Acte or Akte (Ακτή) peninsula (now Mount Athos), the easternmost of the three peninsulas forming the ancient Chalcidice, on its northeastern coast, north of Olophyxus. Thucydides says that among the cities of the peninsula, Sane was colony of Andros, while Thyssus, Cleonae, Acrothoum, Olophyxus and Dium had a heterogeneous population of bilingual barbarians formed by a few Chalcidians and, the rest, Pelasgians, Bisaltians, Crestonians and Edoni. Strabo says that its primitive population was composed of Pelasgians from Lemnos. Pseudo Scylax writes that it was a Greek city. It was the closest city to the isthmus of the peninsula.

It was a member of the Delian League as it appears on the tribute lists to Athens between the years 454/3 BCE and 429/8 BCE. Dium, like Sane, and unlike the other towns of Akte, fought against the Lacedaemonian Brasidas during his expedition in the Chalcidice in 424-423 BCE, and its territory was ravaged by Brasidas's troops. In 421 BCE, Dium occupied Thyssus, then an Athenian ally. In 417 BCE, the inhabitants of Dium rebelled against Athens and joined the Chalcidian League.

The site of Dium is located on the Akte peninsula.
