= Polykastro =

Town in Center Macedonia, Greece

Polykastro Πολύκαστρο
- Municipal unit
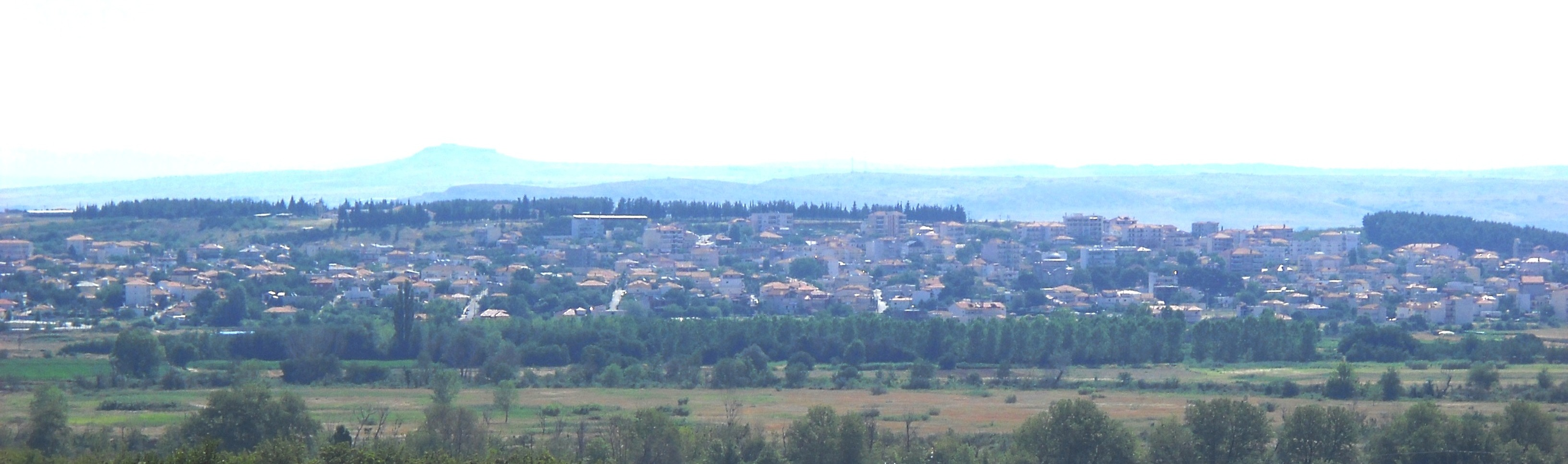
- General view

- Location within the regional unit

- Location within Greece
- Coordinates: 41°00′N 22°34′E
- Country: Greece
- Administrative region: Central Macedonia
- Regional unit: Kilkis
- Municipality: Paionia

Area
  - Municipal unit: 312.7 km^{2} (120.7 sq mi)
  - Community: 45.8 km^{2} (17.7 sq mi)

Population (2021)
  - Municipal unit: 11,338
  - Municipal unit density: 36.26/km^{2} (93.91/sq mi)
  - Community: 6,609
  - Community density: 144/km^{2} (374/sq mi)
- Time zone: UTC+2 (EET)
  - Summer (DST): UTC+3 (EEST)
- Postal code: 612 00
- Vehicle registration: ΚΙ

Polykastro (Greek: Πολύκαστρο, before 1928 Καρασούλι, Karasoúli;) is a town and a former municipality in Kilkis regional unit of Central Macedonia, Greece. Since the 2011 local government reform it is part of the municipality Paionia, of which it is a municipal unit, and the seat. The municipal unit has an area of 312.717 km^{2}, the municipal unit 45.775 km^{2}. The municipal unit of Polykastro has 12,000 inhabitants, and includes Polykastro and 23 villages. It is built near the Axios River, on the road and railway from Thessaloniki to Belgrade. It was formerly known as Karasuli (Turkish), Mavrosuli or Rugunovec (Macedonian and Bulgarian: Ругуновец).

== History ==
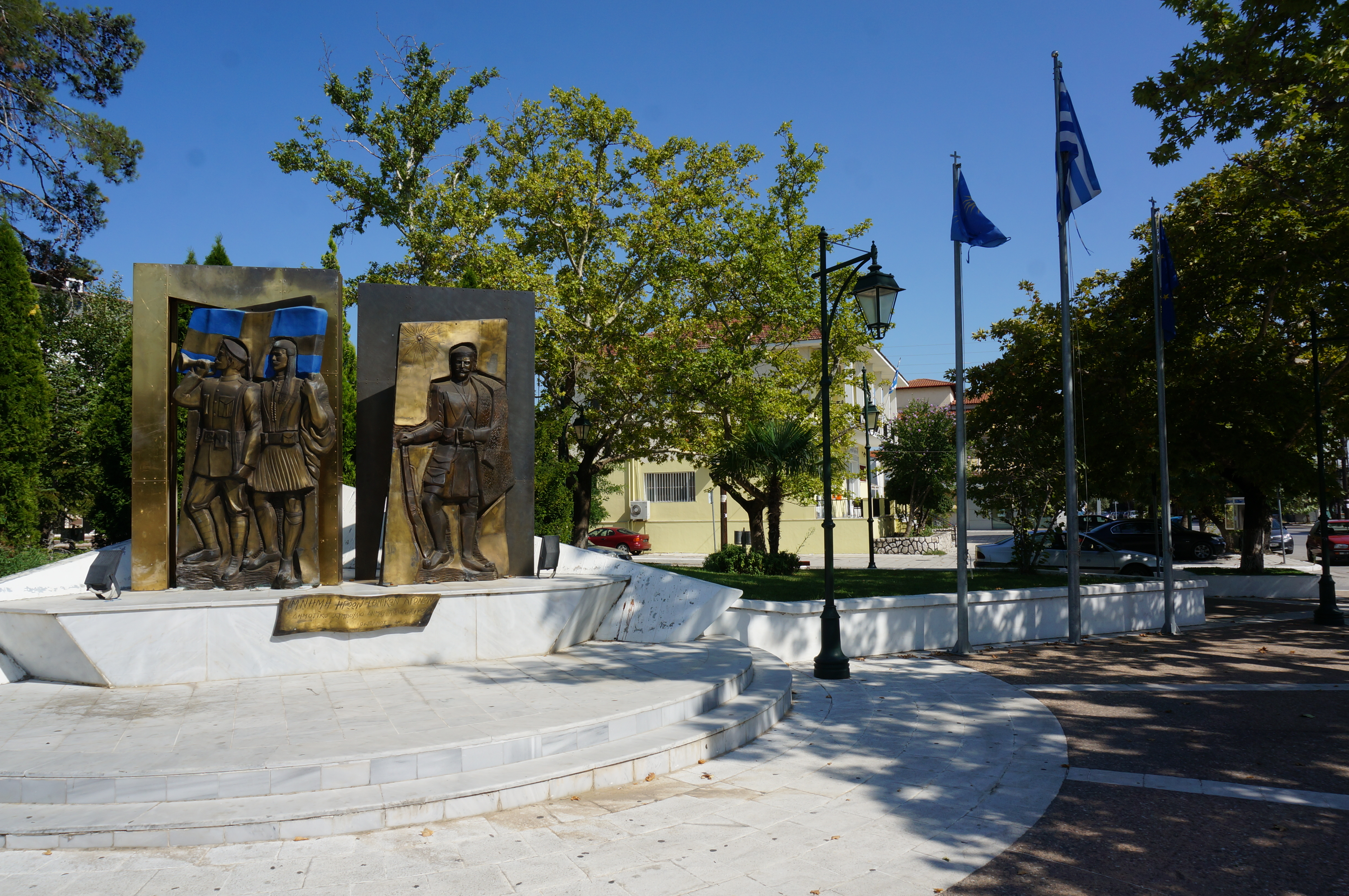
Macedonian Struggle monument

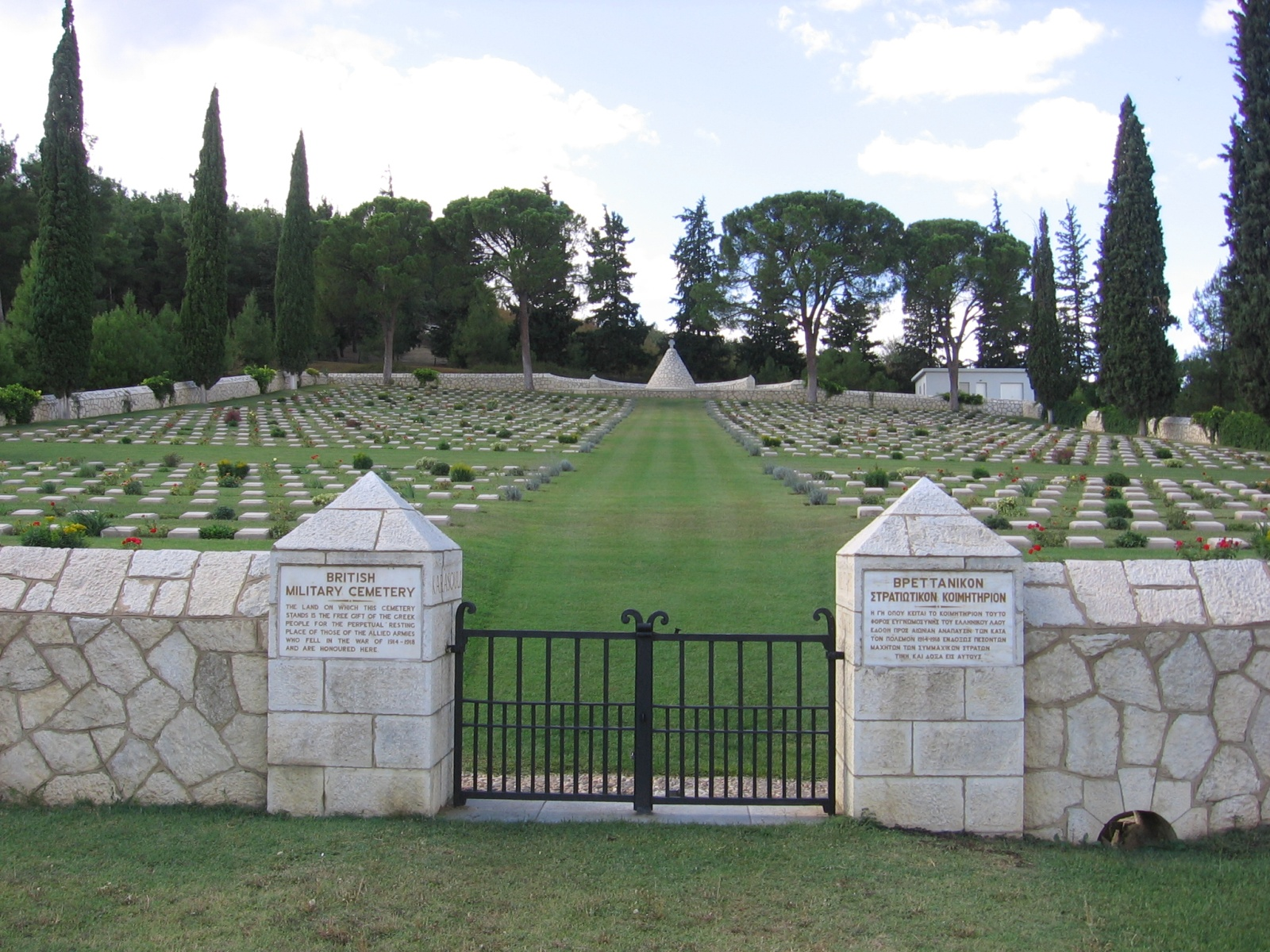
WWI British Military Cemetery near Polykastro (Doiran Memorial)

=== Ancient times ===
The area is inhabited since the Neolithic Era. There are two settlements from that era: in Axiochorion (Amydon) and in Limnotopos (Carabia). In the Bronze Age, 3500 to 3000 BC, Paeonians moved into the area. In Axiochorion was the capital of Paeonia, Amydon. Paeonians from Amydon took part in the Trojan War as Trojan allies, with King Pyraechmes and Asteropaeus. King Pelegon was the one who led Paeonians from the northern valley of the Axios river to the southern valley, now called Amphaxitis. Paeonians also, founded the town Chaetae in Tsaousitsa, near Pontoiraklia. In the 19th century BC, there was an invasion from the east. The invaders were Pelasgians, later known as Crestonians, as they inhabited Krestonia, east of Amphaxitis. In the 12th century BC Phrygians came in the area. Amydon became the first place of iron treatment in Southeast Europe. Phrygians founded the town Baerus or Vairos near the village Kastro. In the 5th century B.C. Macedonians conquered Amphaxitis and by that time, the Area of Polykastro followed the rest of Greece.

=== Roman and East Roman (Byzantine) times ===
In Roman times, Amydon was completely destroyed. The settlement in the region was called Tauriana and belonged in 2nd Division of Macedonia, with Thessaloniki as the capital. During Roman times, 2nd century BC to 4th century AD, Gauls, Goths and Germans made incursions. In Byzantine times there were many wars with the northern tribes, as Avars, Vardars, Bulgars and Slavs and the area was severely affected. In the 13th century, the Byzantine Emperors rebuilt the fortress of Vairos in order to face the northern enemies.

=== Ottoman times ===
In 1397 the area was conquered by the Ottoman Empire and Ottomans started a program of Islamification. Many people left the area to live in the mountains.

The Ottomans called the town Karasouli. That name comes from the Turkish words "kara"=black and "suli"=swamp. Another interpretation of the name is that the Ottomans named it after a local man who had dark skin and was originally from Souli, Epirus.

According to Ottoman traveller Hadji Khalfa, the area was populated only by Greeks and Turks. After the 15th century the area relied on its agricultural economy. Many farm workers came from other places of the Ottoman Empire, in order to work because many locals refused to work in Ottoman owned farms. After the 16th century, many Sarakatsani arrived in the area from Epirus. During 17th and 18th centuries, Vlachs came also in the area, from Western Macedonia, removed because of Turkish/Albanian loots. It is remarkable that in the villages Evzoni and Korona, people used to speak a Romance dialect, called Megleno-Romanian. There are such speakers even nowadays. Researcher Maria Papageorgiou claims that a lot of plays of ancient Greek tragic poets, not preserved nowadays, were kept verbally, in this dialect, as tales.

During the Greek War of Independence, people of Polykastro fought against the Ottomans in the revolutionary movement of Bogdanci, but were unsuccessful. The revolution continued in southern Greece. Many fighters from Polykastro and nearby villages (such as Gevgelija, Bogdanci, etc.) went in Southern Greece to contribute. During the first provisional Greek government, a committee was established, called "Committee of North Macedonians", consisted of three members. One of the three members was from Bogdanci.

After 1850, five Greek communities had been established in the region; in Polykastro, Axiochori, Aspros, Evzonoi and Metamorfossis and four Greek schools; in Polykastro, Aspros, Axiochori and Evzonoi. Two Greek churches and one school were built in the village, they are known as Agii Anargyri (Taxiarches nowadays) and Agios Athanassios. In 1870 the railway station of Karasouli was established.

Late 19th century and early 20th century the conflict between Bulgarians and Greeks in Macedonia led to armed collisions. A lot of local Greek troops were acting in the region of Polykastro municipality. Georgios Vegyris, Georgios Didaskalou and Christos Doitsinis from village Evzoni organised troops against Bulgarians. In the nearby village of Vogoroitsa (now Bogorodica, in the Rep. of North Macedonia) act troops with leaders: Christos Dringas and Dimitrios Ouroumis. Also in Pardeitsa (now Prdeic, in the Rep. of North Macedonia) the teams of Aggelos Athanassiou and Aggelos Dakos act. Those troops were acting in the whole area from Bogdanci and Gevgeli, to Polykastro, Aspros and Doirani.

In 1900, the ethnic composition of the town had changed with many Turks, Adyghe and Romani immigrating to the area. However, according to Bulgarian scholars, Bulgarians still comprised the majority of the population. The ethnic composition of the village according to Vasil Kanchov in 1900 was 340 Bulgarians, 200 Turks, 12 Adyghe and 55 Romani people. The "La Macédoine et sa Population Chrétienne" survey by Dimitar Mishev concluded that the Christian population was composed of 312 Bulgarian Exarchists, 144 Bulgarian Patriarchists and 30 Romanis. Bulgarians maintainеd a school also, in the village in the beginning of the 20th century. Another population data source could be found in Ottoman, Bulgarian and Greek statistics of the era. According to these sources them the population of the area of Polykastro municipality was 7,000 people, 1,000 of whom Greeks, 4,000 Bulgarians and 2,000 Muslims, mainly Turks.

=== Macedonian Struggle ===
The Macedonian Struggle of 1904–1908 aimed at liberating Macedonia from the collapsing Ottoman Empire and uniting it with Greece; several Polykastrins fought against Bulgarian detachments of the Internal Macedonian Revolutionary Organization (IMRO) and Turkish Armies. The Greek commander Georgios Karaiskakis from Bogdanca (now in the Republic of North Macedonia) and his troop were the main defenders of the area. Georgios Karaiskakis"Vogdantsiotis" was acting in an area from Gevgelija and Stromnitsa (now Strumica) to Doirani, Polykastro and Aspros. He was killed in a battle near Strumica against the Bulgarians in 1905. Michael Sionidis from Evzonoi was the most important Macedonian fighter against Bulgarians and took revenge for many assassinations of Greeks by Bulgarians. Georgios Koukogiannis from Metamorphossis with Asterios Demou and Lazaros Doitsinis from Evzonoi were defending their villages by Bulgarians. Konstantinos Argyriou from Polykastro with Traianos Antoniou and Demetrios Giovanis from Axiochorion were fighting and organising the Greek schools.

Finally Polykastro and the area was captured by the Greek Army during the First Balkan War in 1912. Most of its Bulgarian population was expelled to Bulgaria. The area became again a war theatre during WWI (Macedonian front).

=== Modern times ===
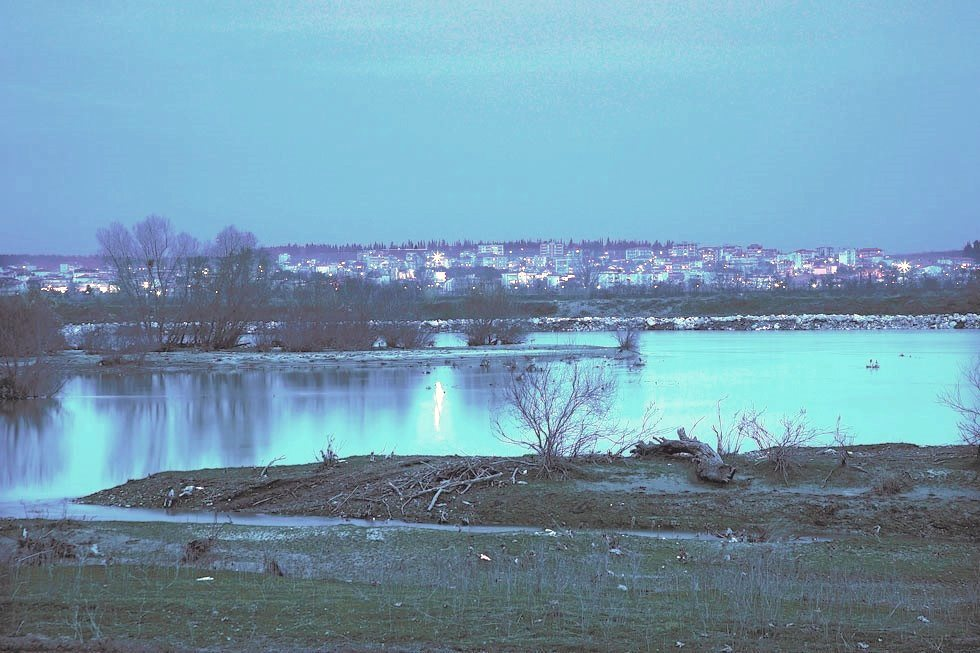
General view of the town and Axios River

Polykastro has witnessed the flow of refugees, from Syria and other countries. Refugees who had arrived on the Southern Sporades islands, and had subsequently been transported to Athens or Thessaloniki would then make their way to the border at Idomeni to the north of Polykastro, often passing by the town on the highway. After the substantial closure of that border in 2015, refugees started camping out, for example at petrol stations on the highway. Humanitarian agency Médecins Sans Frontières set up its offices for the area in Polykastro.

== Famous inhabitants ==
- Ivancho Karasuliyata (1875–1905), IMRO revolutionary
- Michael Sionidis, (1870–1935), Greek Macedonian leader in the Macedonian Struggle
- Georgios Karaiskakis Vogdatsiotis , Greek Macedonian leader in the Macedonian Struggle
- Anton Yugov (1904–1991), Prime Minister of Bulgaria
- Alexandros Karathodoros, (1908–1981), member of parliament (1946–1967), minister of transport (1952–1954)
- Pagonis Vakalopoulos, international football player
- Zafirios Katramadas, actor
- Chryssoula Goudenoudi, champion runner
- Vasiliki Pappa, actress, singer
