= Olophyxus =

Town in Chalcidice, Greece

Coordinates: 40°19′50″N 24°11′26″E

Olophyxus or Olophyxos (Ancient Greek: Ὀλόφυξος) was a town on the peninsula of Acte or Akte (Ακτή) (now Mount Athos), the easternmost of the three peninsulas forming the ancient Chalcidice. Thucydides says that among the cities of Acte, Sane was colony of Andros, while Thyssus, Cleonae, Acrothoum, Olophyxus and Dium had a heterogeneous population of bilingual barbarians formed by a few Chalcidians and, the rest, Pelasgians, Bisaltians, Crestonians and Edoni. Strabo says that its primitive populace was composed of Pelasgians from Lemnos. Pseudo Scylax writes that it was a Greek city.

It was a member of the Delian League, as it appears on the tribute lists to Athens between the years 454/3 BCE and 429/8 BCE. Olophyxus took the side of the Lacedaemonian Brasidas during his expedition in the Chalcidice in 424-423 BCE. Bronze coins minted by Olophyxus from the mid-4th century BCE are preserved.

The location of Olophyxus is tentatively identified with a site near the modern place called Akte.
