= Thyssus =

Town of Chalcidice in ancient Macedon

Coordinates: 40°17′17″N 24°09′31″E

Thyssus or Thyssos (Ancient Greek: Θύσσος) was a town of Chalcidice in ancient Macedon, situated on the west or south side of the peninsula of Acte or Akte (Ακτή) peninsula (now Mount Athos), the easternmost of the three peninsulas forming the ancient Chalcidice, on its western coast, north of Cleonae. Thucydides says that among the cities of the aforementioned peninsula, Sane was colony of Andros, while Thyssus, Cleonae, Acrothoum, Olophyxus and Dium had a heterogeneous population of bilingual barbarians formed by a few Chalcidians and, the rest, Pelasgians, Bisaltians, Crestonians and Edoni. Strabo points out that its primitive populated was composed of Pelasgians from Lemnos. Pseudo Scylax writes that it was a Greek city.

It was a member of the Delian League as it appears on the tribute lists to Athens between the years 454/3 BCE and 429/8 BCE. Thyssus took the side of the Lacedaemonian Brasidas during his actions in the Chalcidice in 424-423 BCE. In 421 BCE, Thyssus, then an ally of Athens, was occupied by Dium.

It is located near Skala Zographou.
