= Acrothoum =

Town of Chalcidice in ancient Macedon

Coordinates: 40°11′02″N 24°20′58″E

Acrothoum or Akrothoon (Ancient Greek: Ἀκρόθωον) or Acrothoi or Akrothooi (Ἀκρόθωοι) or Acroathon or Acrothon was a town of Chalcidice in ancient Macedon, situated near the extremity of the Acte or Akte (Ακτή) peninsula (now Mount Athos), the easternmost of the three peninsulas forming the ancient Chalcidice. Thucydides says that among the cities of the aforementioned peninsula, Sane was colony of Andros, while Thyssus, Cleonae, Acrothoum, Olophyxus and Dium had a heterogeneous population of bilingual barbarians formed by a few Chalcidians and, the rest, Pelasgians, Bisaltians, Crestonians and Edoni. Strabo points out that its primitive populated was composed of Pelasgians from Lemnos. It was stated by Pomponius Mela and other ancient writers that the inhabitants of the town lived longer than ordinary men.

It was probably a member of the Delian League because it took the side of the Lacedaemonian Brasidas during his expedition in the Chalcidice in 424-423 BCE. However, it is not named in the tribute lists of Athens, but only in a decree of 422/1 BCE.

Its site is located about 2 miles (3.2 km) northeast of Mount Athos.
