= Cleonae (Athos) =

Ancient city in Chalcidice, Greece

Coordinates: 40°12′51″N 24°14′01″E

Cleonae or Cleonæ or Kleonai (Ancient Greek: Κλεωναί) was an ancient city on the Acte or Akte (Ακτή) peninsula (now Mount Athos), the easternmost of the three peninsulas forming the ancient Chalcidice, on its western coast, south of Thyssus (Thyssos). Thucydides says that among the cities of the peninsula, Sane was colony of Andros, while Thyssus, Cleonae, Acrothoum, Olophyxus and Dium had a heterogeneous population of bilingual barbarians formed by a few Chalcidians and, the rest, Pelasgians, Bisaltians, Crestonians and Edoni. Strabo points out that its primitive populated was composed of Pelasgians from Lemnos. According to Strabo, it was colonized by Euboean colonists from Chalcis. Heraclides Lembus also writes that Chalcidians settled there. It was a member of the Delian League as it appears on the tribute lists to Athens during the Peloponnesian War.

It is tentatively identified with a site near Daphne.
