= Bisaltae =

Thracian tribe

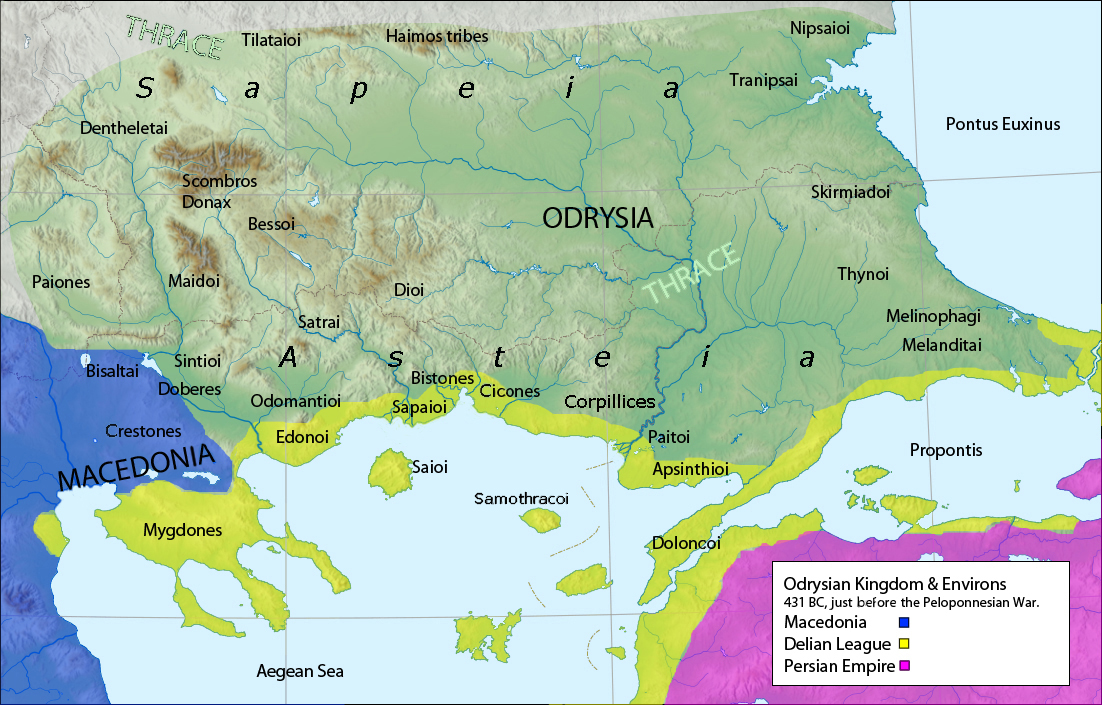
Approximate location of the Bisaltai

The Bisaltae (Greek: Βισάλται) were a Thracian people on the lower Strymon river, who gave their name to Bisaltia, the district between Amphipolis and Heraclea Sintica (the modern village of Rupite, Bulgaria) on the east and Crestonice on the west. They also made their way into the peninsulas of Acte and Pallene in the south, beyond the river Nestus in the east, and are even said to have raided Cardia.

According to mythology, they were the descendants of Bisaltes, the son of Helios and Gaia (the personifications of the Sun and Earth), after whom they were named.

Between the 470s and 450s BC they issued large silver coins, which depict a naked horseman standing next to a horse and wearing a petasos hat, and the name of the tribe in the Parian-Thasian alphabet. These coins weighed 29 grammes each and were by far the largest of a number of similar coins issued by Macedonian and Thracian tribes in this period, numbering perhaps half a million coins (ca. 14,500 kilogrammes of silver). The source of the silver was probably a silver mine at Lake Prasias, near Mount Dysorum, which is mentioned by Herodotus. Under a separate king at the time of the Persian Wars, they were annexed by Alexander I (498 BC-454 BC) to the kingdom of Macedon. He continued to mint coinage from the silver mine at Lake Prasias, using the same coinage designs as the previous Bisaltian coinage. At the division of Macedon into four districts by the Romans after the battle of Pydna (168) the Bisaltae were included in Macedonia Prima.

Plutarch, in his Life of Perikles, says that the Athenians established a colony ("cleruchy")"a thousand to dwell among the Thracian tribe of the Bisaltae." This colony was meant to strengthen Athen's hold over the wealthy region around Amphipolis, which would become a major battleground in the Peloponnesian War.

Their country was rich in figs, vines and olive trees; the silver mines in the mountain range of Dysorum brought in a talent a day to their conqueror Alexander. The Bisaltae are referred to by Virgil in connection with the treatment of the diseases of sheep. The fact that their eponym is said to have been the son of Helios and Ge points to a very early settlement in the district.

== Bibliography ==
- A History of Macedonia: 550-336 B.C by N.G.L. Hammond v. 2 pages 77, 81, 117 ISBN 0-19-814814-3
- D. C. Samsaris, Historical Geography of Eastern Macedonia during the Antiquity (in Greek), Thessaloniki 1976 (Society for Macedonian Studies), p. 54-56. ISBN 960-7265-16-5
