= Mygdonia =

Historical region of Macedonia, Greece

Mygdonia Μυγδονία (Mygdonía)
- Historical region
- Interactive map of Mygdonia
- Country: Greece
- Established: Ancient times

Population
  - Ethnicities: Ancient Macedonians
  - Languages: Ancient Greek

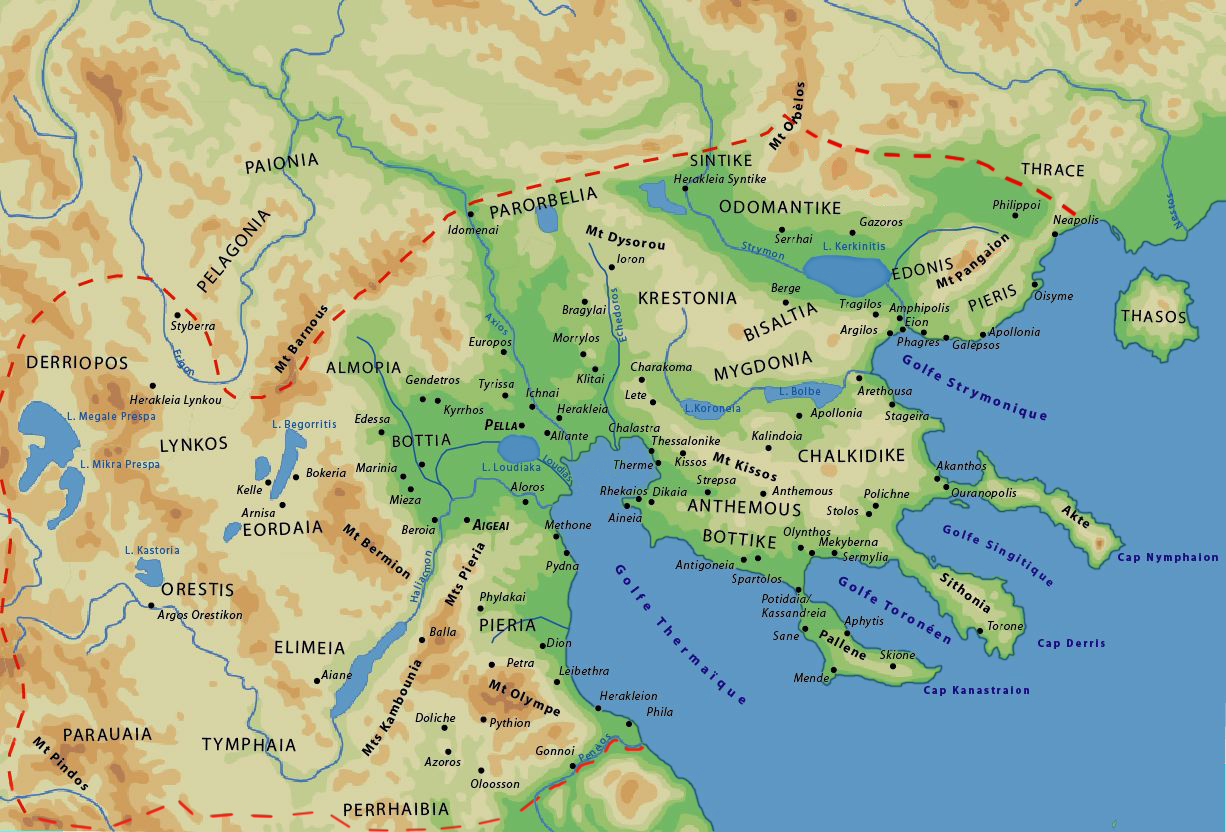
Mygdonia among the other districts of the kingdom of Macedon

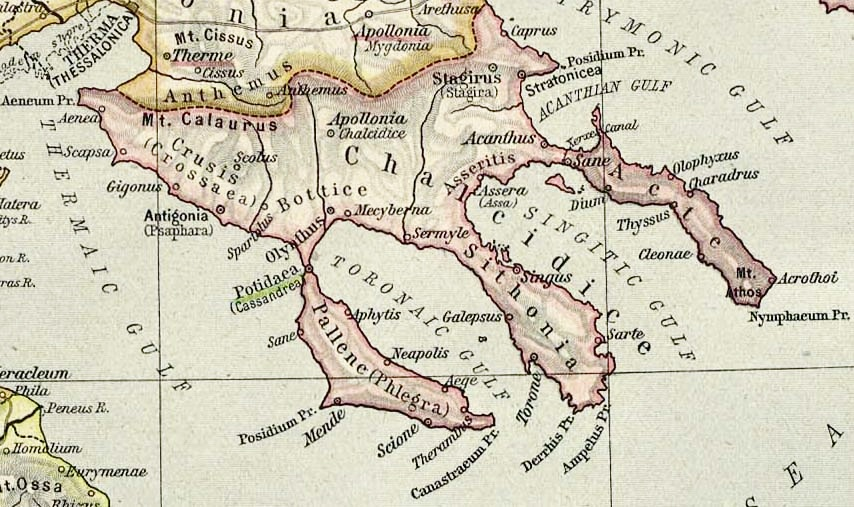
Borders of Mygdonia with Chalcidice

Mygdonia (/mɪɡˈdoʊniə/; Greek: Μυγδονία, romanized: Mygdonia) was an ancient territory, part of ancient Thrace, later conquered by Macedon, which comprised the plains around Therma (Thessalonica) together with the valleys of Klisali and Besikia, including the area of the Axios river mouth and extending as far east as Lake Bolbe. To the north it was joined by Crestonia. The Echeidorus, which flowed into the Thermaic Gulf near the marshes of the Axios, had its sources in Crestonia. The pass of Aulon or Arethusa was probably the boundary of Mygdonia towards Bisaltia. The maritime part of Mygdonia formed a district called Amphaxitis, a distinction which first occurs in Polybius, who divides all the great plain at the head of the Thermaic gulf into Amphaxitis and Bottiaea, and which is found three centuries later in Ptolemy. The latter introduces Amphaxitis twice under the subdivisions of Macedonia (in one instance placing the mouths of the Echidorus and Axios in Amphaxitis, and mentioning Thessalonica as the only town in the district, which agrees with Polybius and with Strabo). In another place Ptolemy includes Stageira and Arethusa in Amphaxitis, which, if correct, would indicate that a portion of Amphaxitis, very distant from the Axios, was separated from the remainder by a part of Mygdonia; but since this is improbable, the word is perhaps an error of the text.

== History and etymology ==
The area has been inhabited since the Mesolithic era (9000–7000 BC). Early inhabitants probably were the Pelasgians, followed by the Mygdones, who gave their name to the region. The Mygdones may have been a Brigian or Thracian tribe. Paeonians and also Thracians (in particular, the Edonians) ruled and inhabited the region for a time, until it was annexed to Macedon.

Mygdonia and the Mygdones were named after Mygdon, a mythological figure considered to be a son of Ares and Callirrhoe, according to Stephanus of Byzantium. His brothers, Edonus, Odomantus and Biston, had other regions and their peoples named after them as well, and so did his sons, Crusis and Grastus.

== Main cities ==
The main cities of Mygdonia were Therma (Thessalonica), Sindus, Chalastra, Altus, Strepsa, Cissus, Mellisurgis (today, Mellisourgós), and Heracleustes. According to the Acts of the Apostles, the town of Apollonia was visited by the apostles Paul and Silas. Besides these, the following obscure towns occur in Ptolemy: Chaetae, Moryllus, Antigoneia (which actually refers to Antigonia Psaphara in the Chalcidice), Calindaea, Boerus, Physca, Trepilus, Carabia, Xylopolis, Assorus, Lete, Phileres, Dicaea, Aeneia and Arethusa.

== Modern Mygdonia ==
Today, most of Mygdonia is comprehended within the Thessaloniki regional unit, in Greece. The Mygdonia municipal unit is named after the ancient region, however it encompasses a much smaller area, consisting of the communities of Drymos, Liti and Melissochori, a total area of about 100 km^{2}. It includes sites of archaeological interest, such as Lete and Derveni. It used to be a municipality of its own, though since 2011 it is part of the municipality of Oraiokastro.

== See also ==
- Lower Macedonia
- Macedonia (Greece)
- Chalcidice
