= Grastus =

Grastus is the son of Mygdon. He is considered founder of the Crestonia region and father of Tirse. The town of Tirsae was named after her and other girls, who gave rise to the name of a Macedonian city Parthenopolis (City of Virgins).
