= Assorus =

Assorus or Assoros may refer to:

- Assorus (Babylonia), a Babylonian city
- Assorus (Mygdonia), a town of ancient Mygdonia, Macedonia, Greece
- Assorus (Sicily), a city of the Sicel in Sicily, later Hellenised as Assoros and now Assoro
