= Chaetae =

Chaetae may refer to:

- Chaetae (town) in ancient Macedon
- Chaeta, an anatomical feature of invertebrates
