= Cleonae =

Cleonae or Cleonæ or Kleonai (Ancient Greek: Κλεωναί) may refer to:

- Cleonae (Argolis), a city of ancient Argolis, Greece, now in Corinthia, Greece
- Cleonae (Chalcidice), a city of ancient Chalcidice, on Mount Athos, Greece
- Cleonae (Phocis), a town of ancient Phocis, Greece
