= Parthenopolis =

Parthenopolis (Ancient Greek: Παρθενόπολις) may refer to:

- Parthenopolis (Chalcidice), an ancient town of the Chalcidice, Greece
- Parthenopolis (Sintice), an ancient town of Sintice, now in Bulgaria
- Parthenopolis, small Greek emporion on the territory of today's Costinești village, part of the Costinești commune in Constanța County, Romania
