= Uranopolis =

Ancient city in Chalcidice, Greece

Coordinates: 40°21′49″N 23°56′05″E

Uranopolis or Ouranopolis (Ancient Greek: Οὐρανόπολις) was a city in the Chalcidice in ancient Macedonia, allegedly founded by Alexarchus, brother of king Cassander of Macedonia. Uranopolis was the site of a mint in the Kingdom of Thrace. Coins of Uranopolis are known for displaying Athena or the Muse Aphrodite Urania, the muse of astronomy, sitting on a globe. The globe represents the Celestial Sphere. It is a common misunderstanding that the globe represents the earth and that this is the first known depiction of the earth in its actual shape.

As Pliny the Elder does not mention Sane in his list of towns of Acte (modern Mount Athos), some consider that Uranopolis occupied its site.

== Name given erroneously to a city in Galatia ==
In the 19th and early 20th centuries the name "Uranopolis" was mistakenly given to the town and bishopric of Verinopolis in the Catholic Church's list of titular sees. Verinopolis was in the late Roman province of Galatia Prima. Its ruins are near present-day Köhne in Turkey.

== Bibliography ==
- Imhoof-Bluumer, F. (1883). "Monnaies grecques". Paris and Leipzig.
- Müller, ed. Didot (1890). Notes on Ptolemy.
