= Bisaltes =

Eponymous hero of the Bisaltae and Bisaltia

In Greek mythology, Bisaltes (Greek: Βισάλτης), son of Helios and Gaia, was the eponymous hero of the Bisaltae and Bisaltia in Thracian Macedonia. Theophane was the daughter of Bisaltes.
