= Moryllus =

Coordinates: 40°54′12″N 22°48′18″E

Moryllus or Moryllos (Ancient Greek: Μόρυλλος) was a town of ancient Macedonia, placed by Ptolemy in the otherwise obscure district of Paraxia, then assumed to be in the district of Anthemus, but now it is placed, thanks to an inscription, in the interior Mygdonia or Crestonia, near modern Ano Apostoli, Kilkis prefecture. The only attested citizens of Moryllus are two Delphic theorodokoi, Hadymos and Seleukos sons of Argaios (c. 230-220 BCE).

The site of Moryllus is located near modern Ano Apostoli.
