= Physca =

Town in Ancient Macedonia

Physca or Physka (Ancient Greek: Φύσκα), Physcae or Physkai (Φύσκαι), Physcas or Physkas (Φύσκας), or Physcus or Physkos (Φύσκος), was a town of ancient Macedonia. It was placed by Ptolemy in the district of Mygdonia, and by others in that of Eordaea. Thucydides remarks that near it there still remained some of the descendants of the Eordaei, who had been expelled from all other parts of their original settlements by the Teminidae.

The site of Physca is unlocated.
