= Gallicum =

Town in ancient Macedonia

Coordinates: 40°47′21″N 22°50′11″E

Gallicum or Gallikon was a town of Crestonia in ancient Macedonia. It was situated 16 Roman miles from Thessalonica on the Roman road to Stobi.

Its site is located near modern Kolchis, Kilkis, 4,5 km south of Kilkis.
