= Mygdon (son of Ares) =

Son of Ares in Greek mythology

In Greek mythology, Mygdon (Ancient Greek: Μύγδων) was the son of Ares and Callirrhoe according to Stephanus of Byzantium. He had three brothers named Edonus, Odomantus and Biston and was the father of Crusis and Grastus. He is considered the eponymous hero of the Thracian tribe Mygdones and founder of the Mygdonia region in ancient Macedon.
