= Mount Chortiatis =

Mountain in Greece

Chortiatis
- Cissus, Kissos
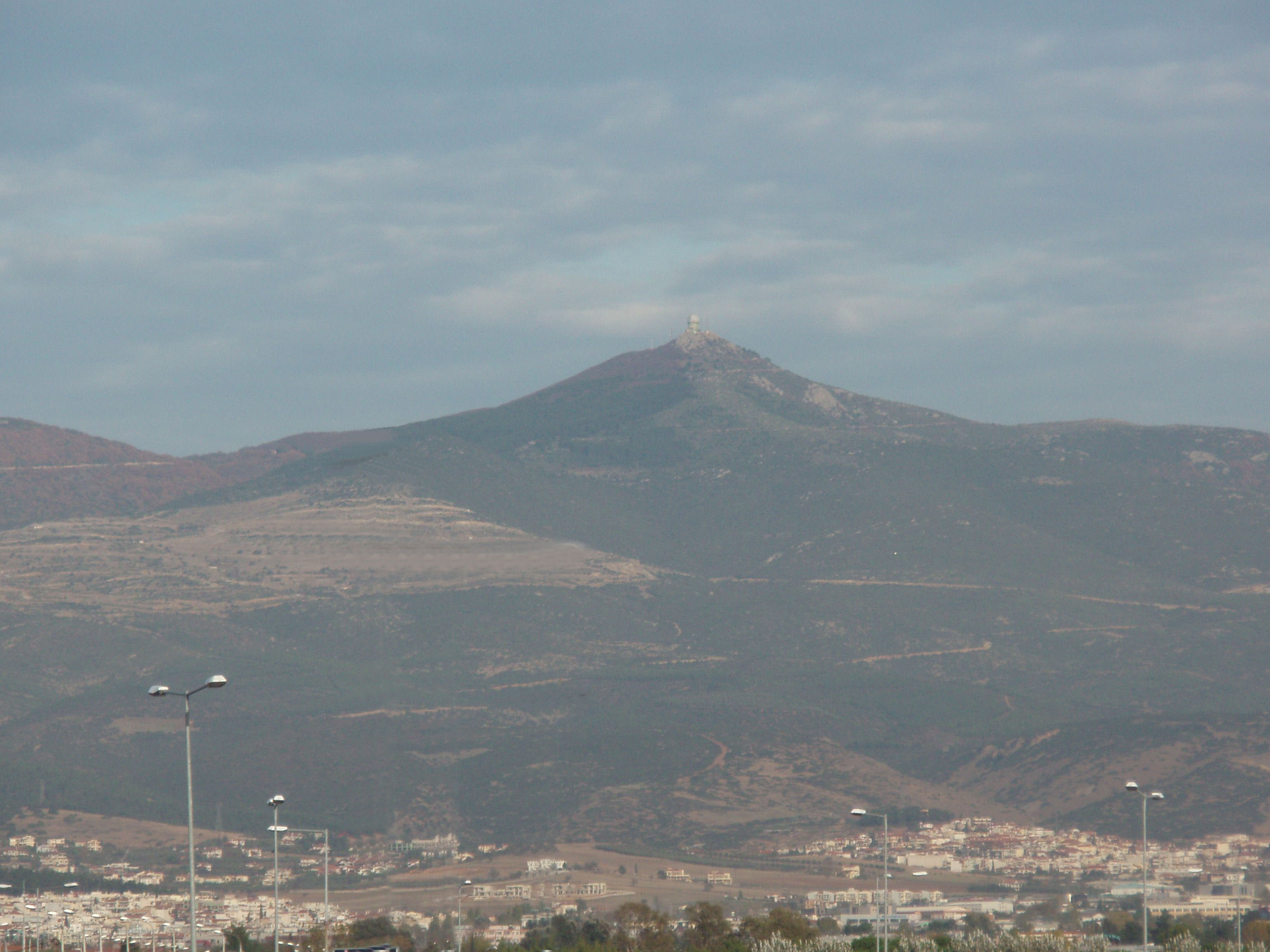
- Chortiatis mountain (with observatory at peak)

Highest point
- Elevation: 1,201 m (3,940 ft)
- Prominence: 1,009 m (3,310 ft)
- Listing: Ribu
- Coordinates: 40°35′00″N 23°07′00″E

Geography
- Location within Greece
- Location: Thessaloniki, Greece

Mount Chortiatis or Hortiatis (Greek: Όρος Χορτιάτη, Χορτιάτης), known in Antiquity as Cissus (Ancient Greek: Κισσός) or Kissos, is a mountain in Central Macedonia, Greece. It rises southeast of Thessaloniki, peaking at 1,201 metres. Besides the city of Thessaloniki, there are several suburbs and villages located on the foothills of Chortiatis, most notably Chortiatis and the affluent suburb of Panorama, both of them belonging in the Pylaia-Chortiatis municipality. The mountain's landscape is wooded, with part of these woods making up Thessaloniki's Seich Sou Forest National Park. A fall wind that occurs on the Thermaic Gulf was named after the mountain as well.

Mount Chortiatis played a crucial role for the water supply of Thessaloniki from ancient up until modern times. In the late Byzantine period (ca. 1300), the Chortaïtes monastery on the northern slopes of the mountain provided the city and the region east of it with fresh water by an aqueduct whose remains have been partly preserved.

== Mythology ==
The mythological elements around Mount Kissos (or Chortiatis), in the eastern part of the Thermaic Gulf, and the homonymous settlement, refer to King Kissea of Thrace, who is testified by Homer, but also to the ivy, a plant associated with Dionysus. like the vine.

Kissea's daughter, Theano, married the Trojan Antinor and became a priestess of Athena in Ilion. Ifidamas, son of Antinor and Theano, grew up in Thrace near his grandfather Kissea, and married his grandfather's young daughter. While hiking, Ifidamas arrived in Troy, with twelve ships under his command, and was killed by Agamemnon.

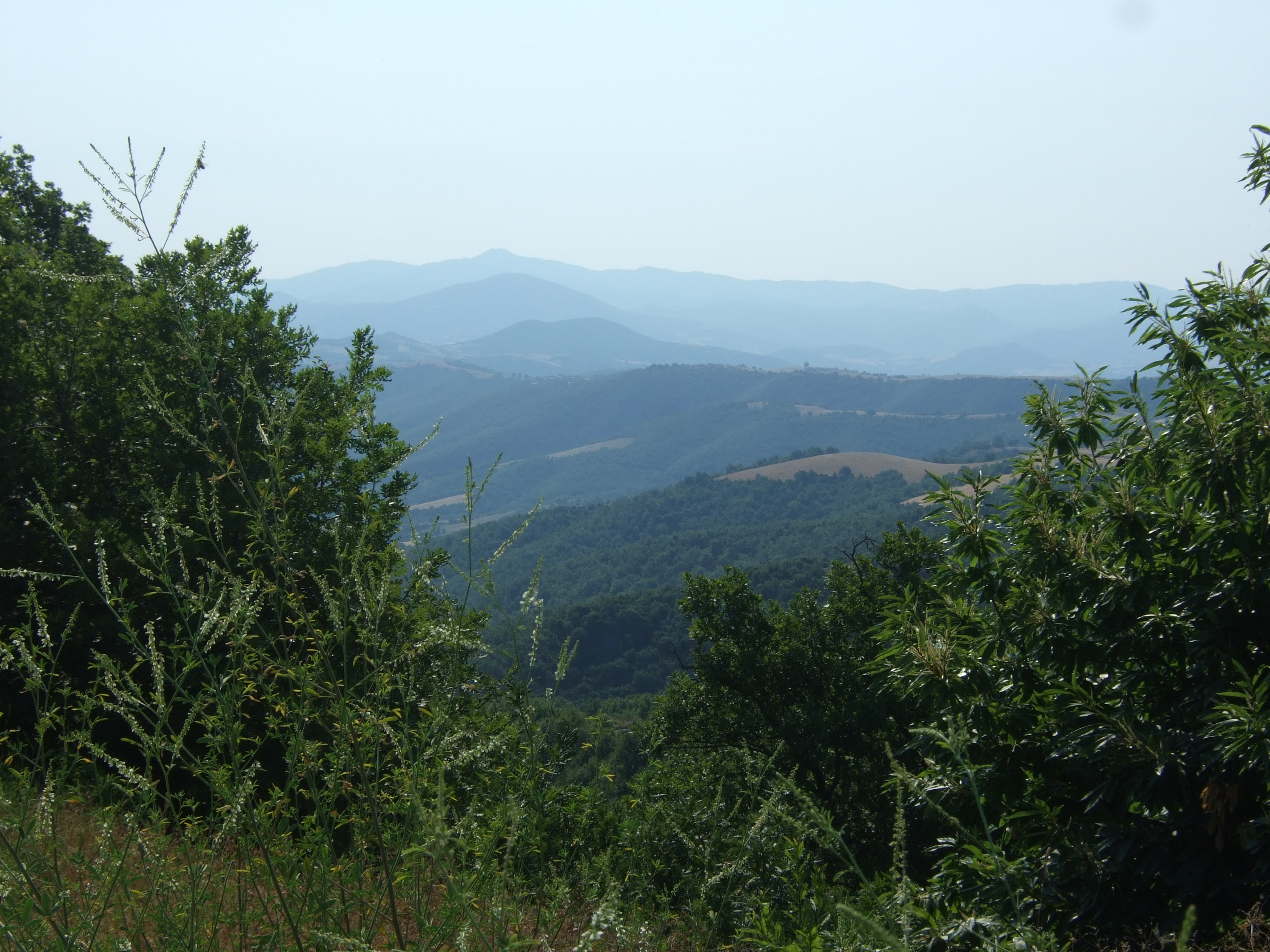
A view
