= Xylopolis =

Xylopolis (Ancient Greek: Ξυλόπολις) was a town of Mygdonia in ancient Macedonia, whose inhabitants, the Xylopolitae, are mentioned by Pliny the Elder.

The site of Xylopolis is unlocated, but a location near Krestonis is suggested.
