= Mellisurgis =

Historic town in Ancient Macedonia (Ancient Greece)

Coordinates: 40°35′34″N 23°28′04″E

Mellisurgis was a town of Mygdonia, in ancient Macedonia, situated on the road from Thessalonica to Apollonia of Mygdonia, which occurs in two of the itineraria (Itin. Anton.; Peut. Tab.), at a distance of 20 M. P. from Thessalonica. By the mid-19th century, it still preserved its ancient name in the usual Romaic form of Melissurgús, and was inhabited by honeymakers, as the word implies.

The site of Mellisurgis is near the modern Melissourgos.
