= Alexandros Karathodoros =

Greek politician

Alexandros Karathodoros (Greek: Αλέξανδρος Καραθόδωρος, 1908 – 1981) was a Greek politician and minister. He was born in Trikala in 1908 to a Sarakatsani family. In 1920 his family moved near Polykastro, in village Latomi, Kilkis regional unit because it was closer to the Vermio Mountains, where they were herding the sheep in summer. He studied law in the university of Athens. Elected as member of the parliament continuously from 1946 to 1967, he became Minister for Transport and Communications from 1950 to 1952 and Minister without Portfolio in 1966. He was imprisoned by the military junta in 1967. Karathodoros died in Athens in 1981.

== See also ==
- Politics of Greece
- Greek politicians
