= Seih Sou =

Hill in Greece

Seih Sou (Kedrinos Lofos) Greek: Σέιχ Σου (Κέδρινος Λόφος)
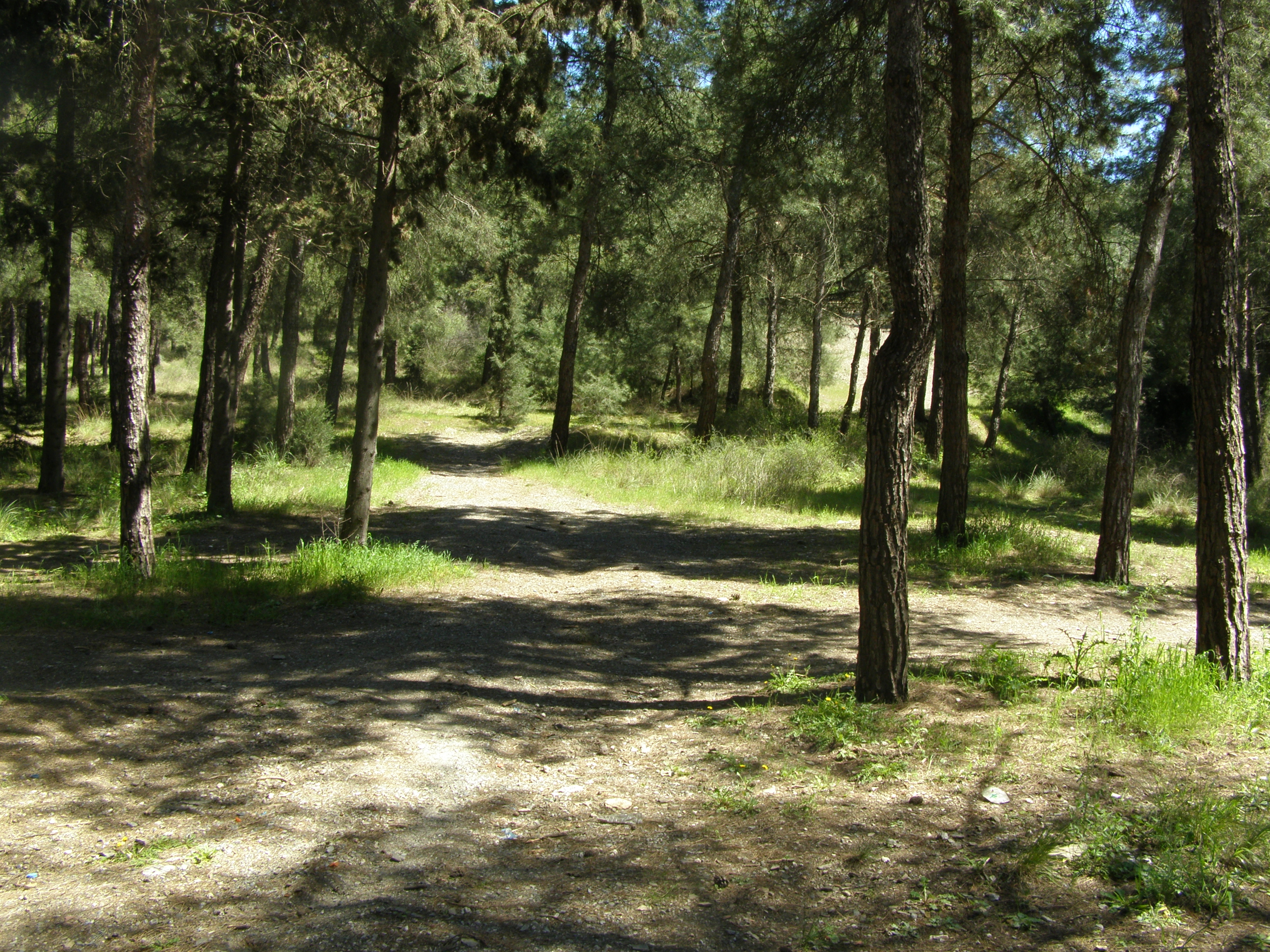
- Interactive map of Seih Sou (Kedrinos Lofos)

Geography
- Location: Central Macedonia, Greece
- Coordinates: 40.6387664°N 22.9920734°E
- Elevation: 563 m (1,847 ft)
- Area: 2,979 ha (7,360 acres)

Ecology
- Dominant tree species: Pinus brutia; Pinus pinea; Pinus halepensis

Seih Sou or Seikh Su (Σέιχ Σου, from Turkish: Şeyh Su, meaning the Sheikh's Water), also known as Kedrinos Lofos (Greek: Κέδρινος Λόφος, Cedar Hill), is a hilltop forest just to the north and northeast of the city of Thessaloniki, Greece, that rises to the west of Mount Chortiatis. The forest covers 2,979 hectares (7,361 acres) and reaches an elevation of 563 meters (1,847 feet).

== Flora and fauna ==
The forest hosts 277 plant species, among which pine trees (Pinus brutia, Pinus pinea, and Pinus halepensis) are dominant. There are also scattered cypress (Cupressus sempervirens), plane trees (Platanus orientalis), and many species of Populus.

Seih Sou is also home to a rich variety of fauna. Mammals include hares, foxes, martens, squirrels, weasels, and hedgehogs. Around 80 types of birds frequent the forest, chief among them the short-toed snake eagle, the common cuckoo, nightingales, the rock partridge, owls, and the song thrush. Salamanders, frogs, turtles, grass snakes, and lizards are the most common amphibians and reptiles.

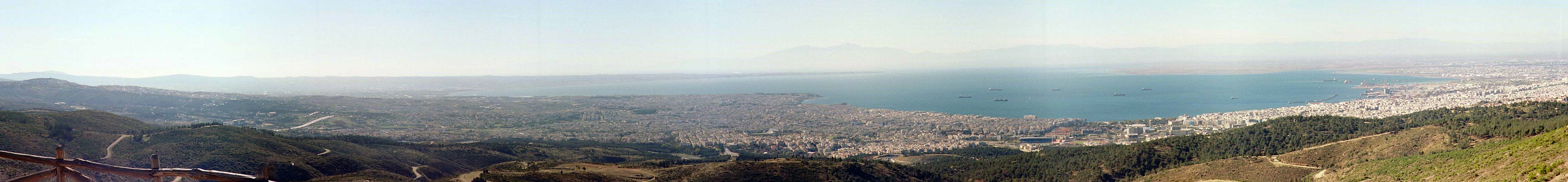
Panoramic view of the city from Seih Sou with Mount Olympus in the background.

Beekeeping is also widely practiced, with many honey farms scattered throughout the forest.

== Etymology ==
The southwestern portion of the forest was originally called Chilia Dentra (Greek: Χίλια Δέντρα), or Thousand Trees, as it was one of the parts that was spared deforestation during the Ottoman period. It was during the Ottoman period that the area received the name شهیح سو, or Şeyh Su in the modern Turkish alphabet, meaning the Sheikh's Water. The name is derived from a spring located near a mausoleum within the forest. The name has since entered the Greek language as Seih Sou (Σέιχ Σου).

The name Kedrinos Lofos (Greek: Κεδρηνός Λόφος), or Cedar Hill, was also given in 1987 when a local author, Georgios Vafopoulos, suggested it in Thessaloniki's city council. The name Kedrinos is a play on a Byzantine-era historian, George Kedrenos, who wrote extensively on the forest and on the word 'cedar'.

== History ==
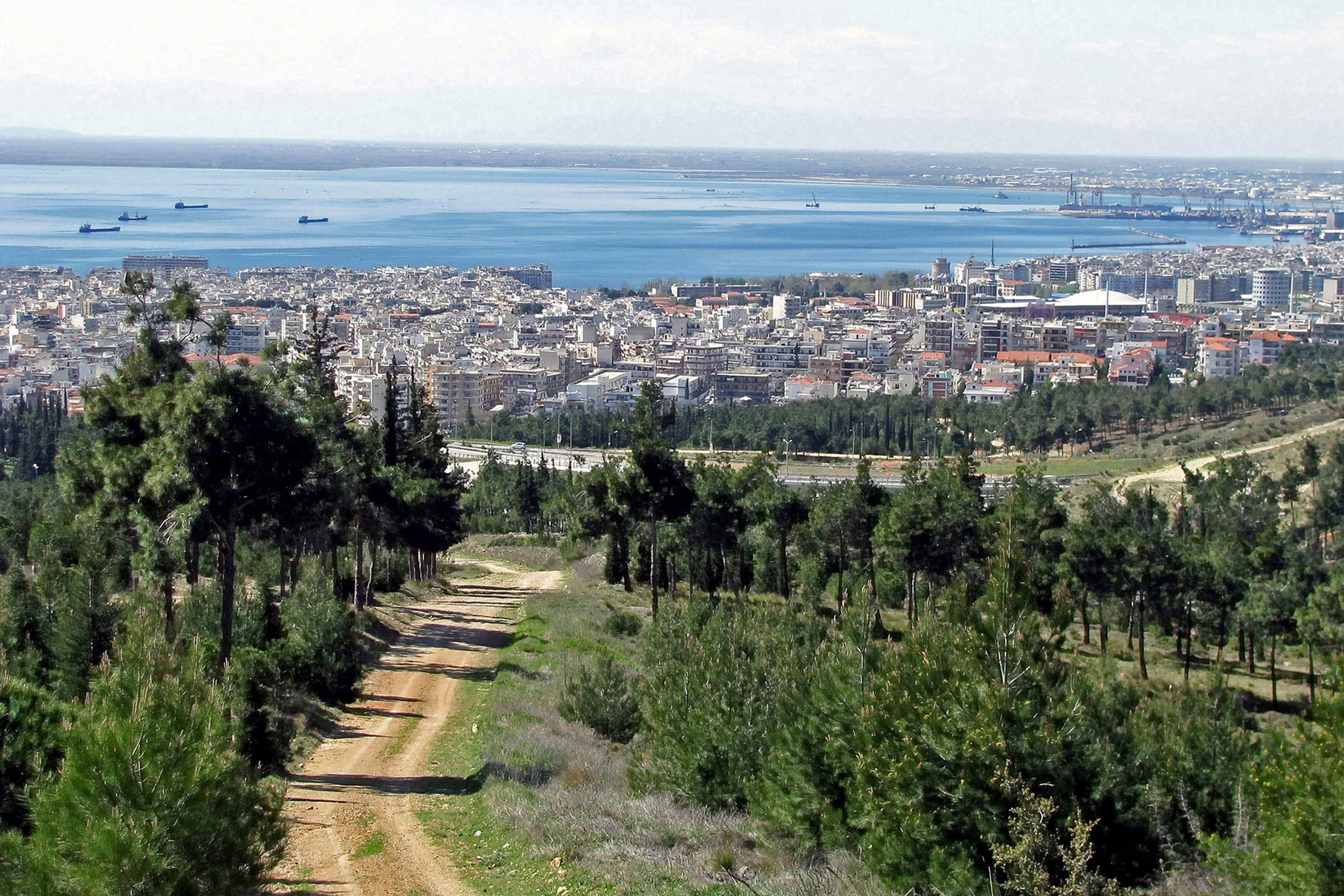
View from the hill's forest

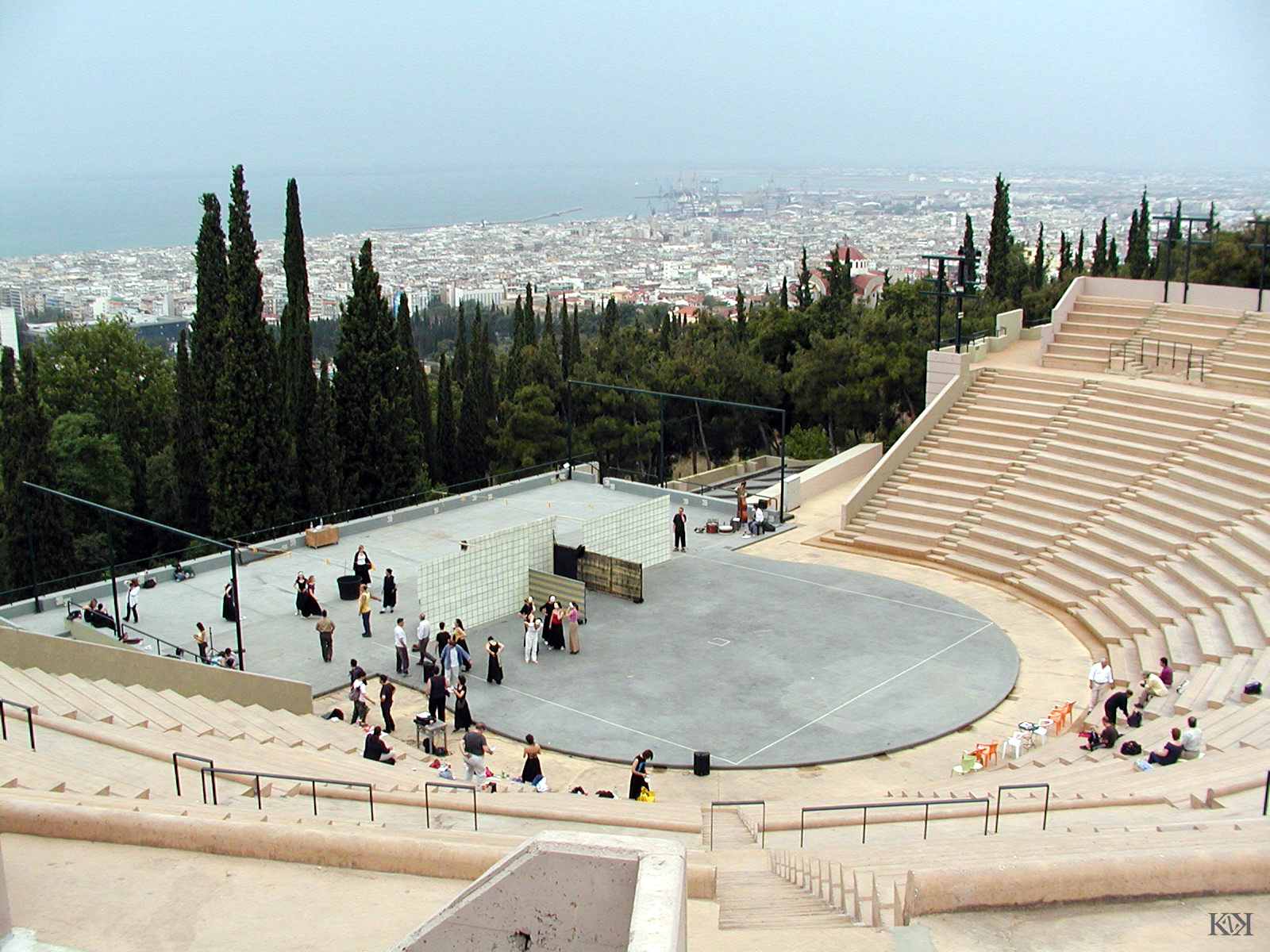
Theatro Dasous

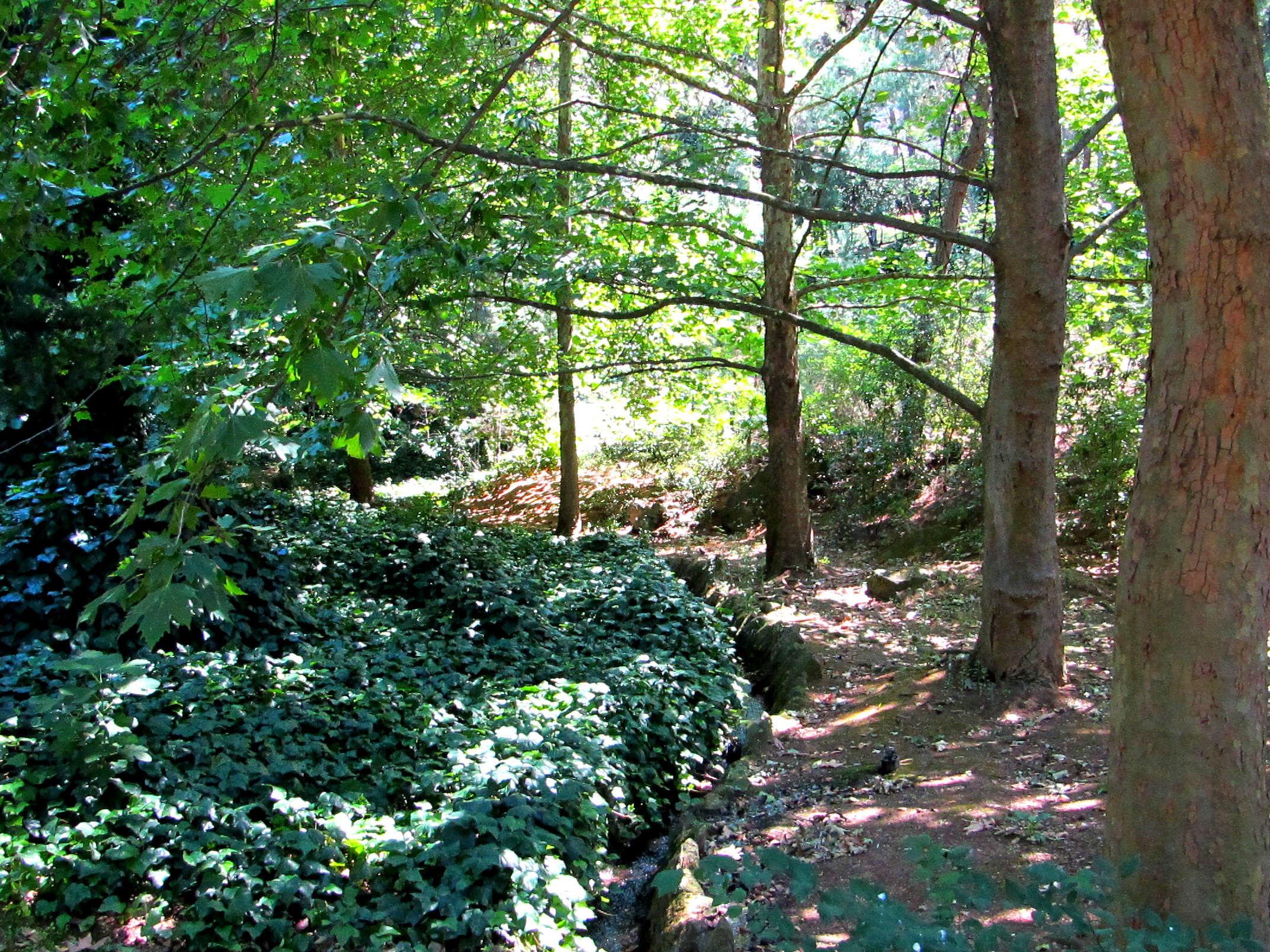
Zoo park

Originally, the area was an oak (primarily Quercus pubescens) forest that was the source of all the rivers that ran through the city of Thessaloniki and ultimately emptied into the Thermaic Gulf. During the Ottoman era, logging, grazing, and farming contributed to the deforestation of the area.

In 1921, a decision was made to reforest the area by the Hellenic Ministry of Agriculture. This project was undertaken by the Forestry School of the Aristotle University of Thessaloniki, which planted nearly 5 million trees between 1929 and 1989.

In 1982 a small fire broke out in the forest.

On July 7, 1997, a large fire broke out and burned 55% of the forest down over a period of 60 hours. Two large reforestation projects took place in 1998 and 2000, but most of the reforestation has been natural. As of 2010, 36.4% still remains clear of trees.

== Sites ==
The forest is home to Thessaloniki's main zoo, its natural history museum, two amphitheatrical open-air theaters overlooking the city (Theatro Dasous or Forest Theater and Theatro Gaias or Earth Theater), hiking and biking trails, and two lookout points that overlook the city. The Hotel Philippion is also located on the main road traversing the forest, and is just east of the peak of Kara Tepe (elevation: 350 m). The Chapel of St. Basil is located on a hill just south of Kara Tepe.

== Issues ==
The pine trees have suffered from an infestation of the pine processionary, which has led to defoliation and to calls for greater variety in the forest's flora.

The heavily congested Thessaloniki Inner Ring Road borders the southern side of the forest.
