= Heracleustibus =

Populated place in ancient Macedonia

Coordinates: 40°38′58″N 23°17′44″E

Heracleustibus was a populated place, a station in the Jerusalem Itinerary, 11 M. P. from Apollonia in Mygdonia. Gottlieb Lukas Friedrich Tafel has conjectured that it is equivalent to Ἡρακλέους στίβος. The name comes down to us also in the form of Heracleustes.

The site of Heracleustibus is near the modern Konios.
