= Cissus (Mygdonia) =

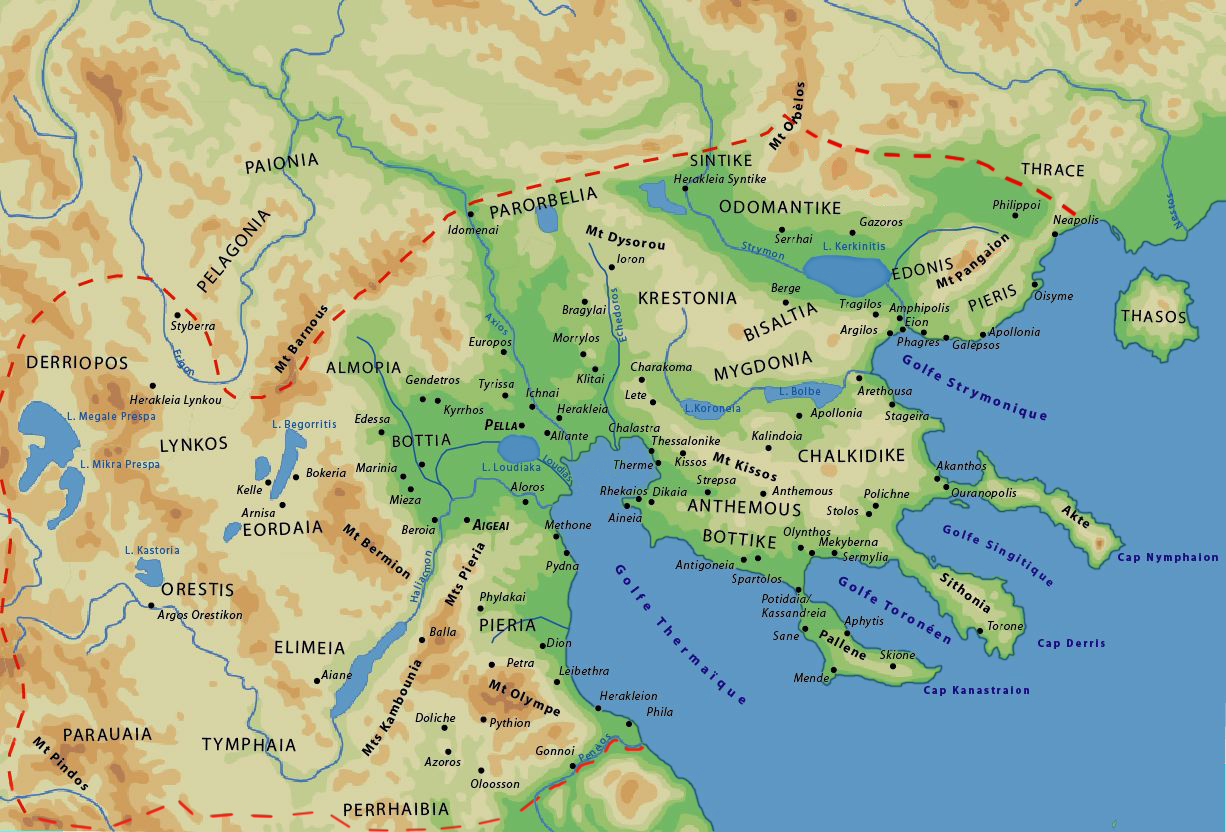
Macedonia and the Chalcidice

Cissus or Kissos (Ancient Greek: Κισσός) was a town of Amphaxitis, Macedon, not far from Rhaecelus, which appears to have been the name of the promontory where Aeneas legendarily founded his city. Cissus, along with Aeneia and Chalastra, contributed to the aggrandizement of Thessalonica (315 BC). Cissus was the birthplace of Cisseus, a Thracian chief mentioned by Homer.

There was also a mountain of the same name nearby, now called Mount Chortiatis, on which were found the lion, ounce, lynx, panther, and bear.
