= Natural History Museum (Thessaloniki) =

Museum in Thessaloniki, Greece

Coordinates: 40.6377°N 22.9689°E

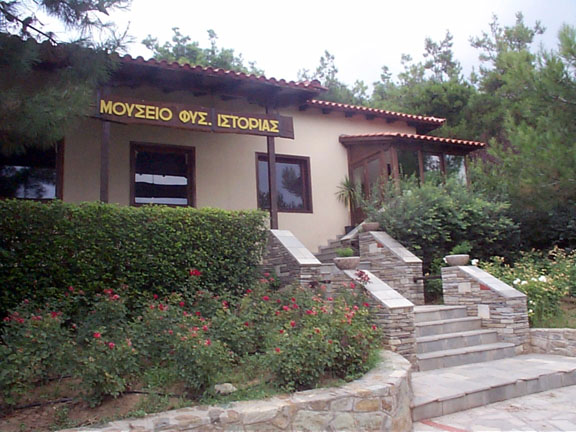
View from outside

The Natural History Museum in Thessaloniki, Macedonia, Greece is in the grounds of the Zoo on Kedrinos Lofos in the Hilia Dendra district. It opened in 1994, its purpose being to show the public the various species of fauna in Greece. All the animals and birds are displayed in natural attitudes and are in themed groups.

Inside the museum, the guide shows visitors a wide variety of birds, mammals, skeletons, bones, reptiles, and rocks. There are eight showcases displaying the mouth of the Axios River, a typical forest in Macedonia from 100 m to 1,000 m above sea-level, rock samples, stuffed owls and eagles, a snowy landscape at alpine level, skeletons and bones of mammals and birds; and two showcases containing highland reptiles and lowland reptiles.

The first showcase shows the fauna of the Axios delta, an area which is protected by international conventions and has an ecosystem similar to that of the River Evros. The area is home to waterbirds (many types of duck, stork, and heron) and numerous animals, even jackals, which have disappeared from other parts of Greece.

In the second showcase we see the wildlife on a typical mountain in Macedonia, particularly as it takes shape at different altitudes between 100 m and 1,000 m above sea level. The display includes the homes of animals (badgers, foxes, rats, moles) and a number of birds.

In the third showcase are rocks from the Cyclades, while the fourth displays the raptors of Greece, both nocturnal (long-eared owl, eagle owl, barn owl) and diurnal (marsh harrier, magpie, Levant sparrowhawk).

In the fifth and sixth showcases, visitors can see the reptiles of Greece, both those living in the mountains and those that keep to the plains.

The seventh showcase portrays the food chain, showing a pine marten hunting a squirrel, a snake catching a mink, a mink catching a lizard, and a fox hunting water rats. Opposite there is a replica of a dolphin which lived in the Thermaic Gulf until ten years ago, and corals, a lobster, a crayfish, crabs, and sponges; and the eighth and last showcase contains the skeletons of numerous animals and birds. From the skeletons on display it is possible to determine the age and the sex of each animal and whether or not it suffered from certain diseases.

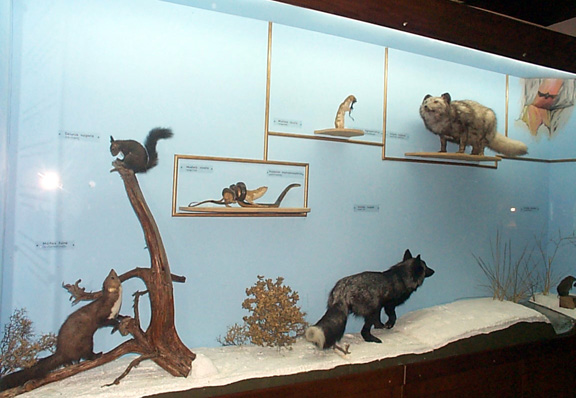
Fifth showcase

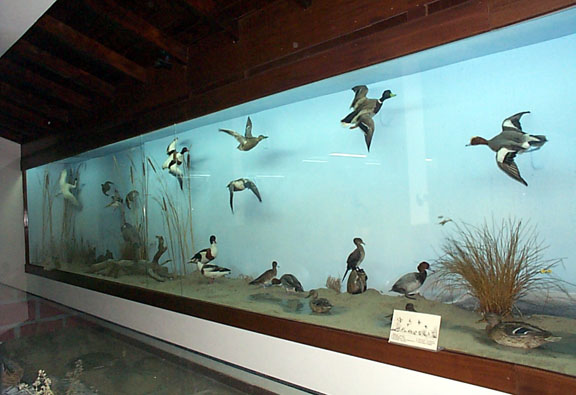
First showcase

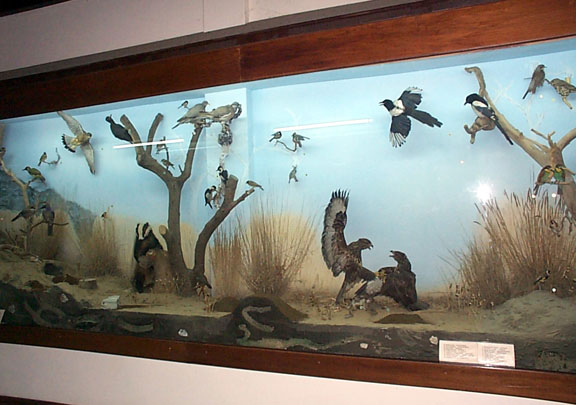
Second showcase

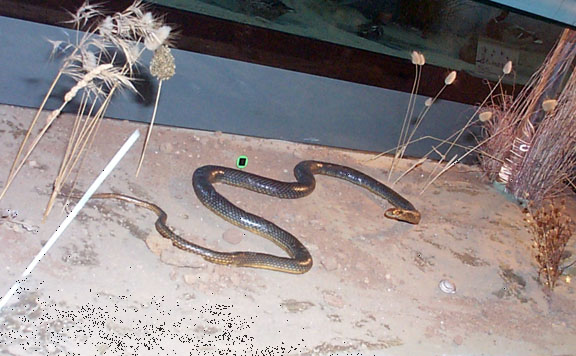
Sixth showcase
