= Brea (Thrace) =

Coordinates: 40°17′17″N 23°07′46″E

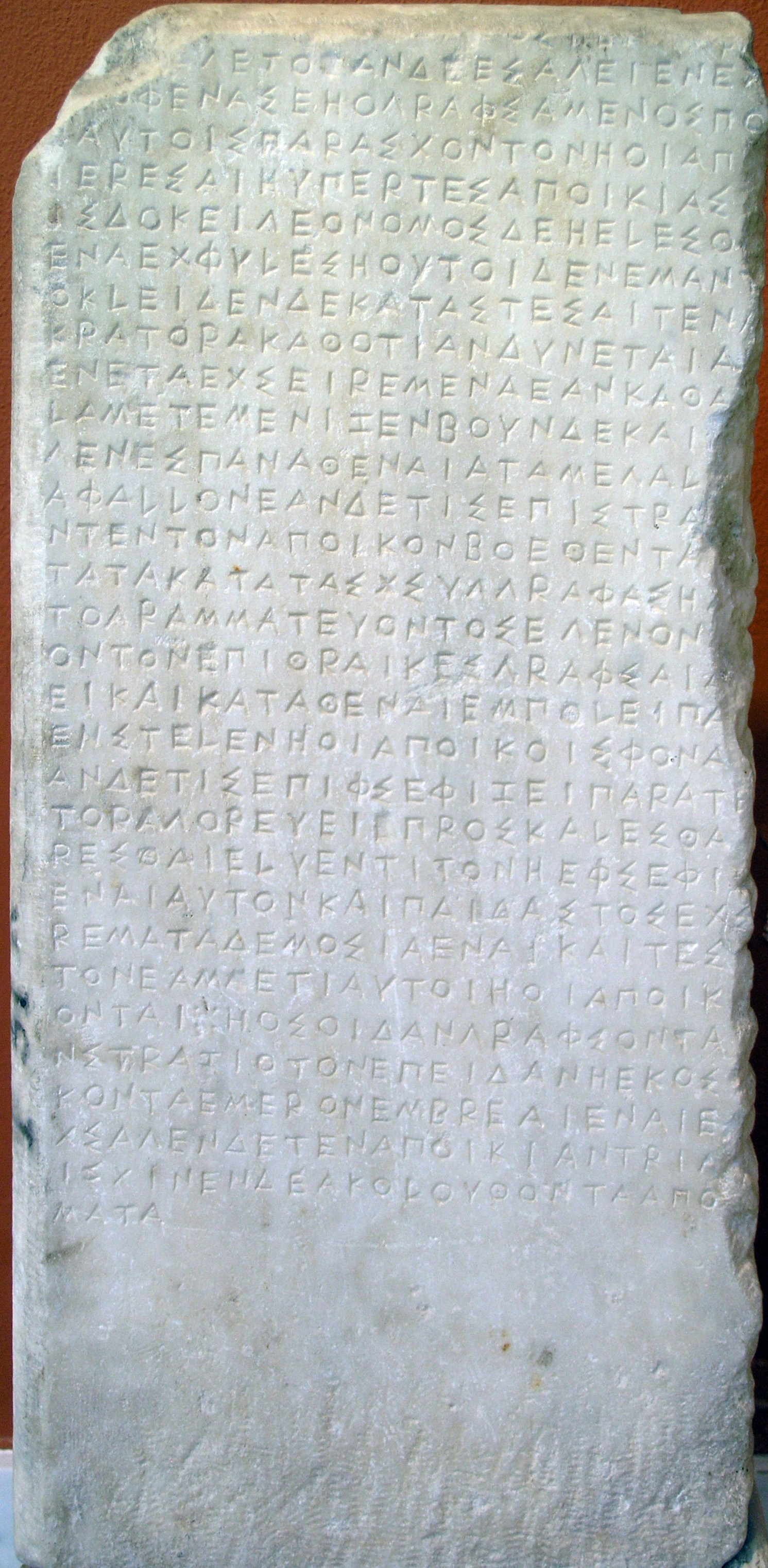
Brea stone in the Epigraphic Museum Athens.

Brea (Ancient Greek: Βρέα, demonym: Βρεαῖος or Βρεάτης) was an ancient Greek colony in Thrace. Nothing is known about the city itself. Nevertheless, the city is considered important by an inscription in which its 446/5 BC founding is mentioned, which is known as the Brea decree, the Brea inscription, or the Brea stone.

== Location ==
The exact location of Brea is unknown. Some scholars locate it to Bisaltia, Thrace, in the lower reaches of Strymon, and some to Chalcidice about 4 miles (6.5 km) south of Nea Syllata. In ancient Greece, Chalcidice was also considered to be part of Thrace.

== History ==
The city was a colony of Athens. There is no information about its future fate after their foundation; perhaps it was destroyed by the Thracians a few years after the founding. In the year 437 BC, the colony founded Amphipolis; thereafter, it makes no further appearance in Thucydides.

== Plutarch ==
Plutarch mentions the establishment of a colony in Thrace in his Pericles: 'In addition, he sent a thousand citizens as settlers to the Chersonese, five hundred to Naxos, half of them Andros, a thousand to Thrace, to live together with the Bisaltians...'. He interprets this colonization in such a way that Pericles in his far-sightedness, with a social program, alleviated the plight of the people and therefore sent the unemployed to the colony. and the intimate poleis in Thrace were also intimidated by the colony.

== The Brea Decree ==
The Brea decree (446/5 BC) is an inscribed stone inscribed in stone on the Athenian colonization in the 5th century BC, And the 'example of the planned establishment of an independent polis within the framework of the Athenian colonization policy and the exercise of power at the beginning of the Delian League. The text contains several provisions concerning the participants and the execution of the train, the holding of the victims, the installation of sacred districts, and the chief proxy. Added to this is the commitment of the allied cities in Thrace to support Brea in Thracian raids. The Athenian general assembly here clearly reveals the actual function of the colonization to maintain the position of power in this region, because Athens had a strong interest in the Strymon region due to the strategic position of the mines and the precious metals to be mined there.

The source translates: '... the person who has reported the complaint or the plaintiff. ... to make available to them the settlers (apoikistai) to offer for the apoikiai (= colony) so many auspicious victims as they are good. As a geonoman (= Landverteiler) one should choose ten men, one from one (each) Phyle; these are to distribute the land. Demokleides is to set up the Apoikie as plenipotentiary to the best property. The holy districts, which are reserved, are to be left as they are, and no more to be staked out. A beef and a panhoplie (= full armor) are to be sent to the great Panathenaia and the Dionysia a phallus. If a person takes a campaign against the territory of the (Attic) settlers, help the cities as vigorously as possible according to the agreements made, as ... secretary, concerning the cities of Thrace. Record these provisions on a stele and (they) in the polis; to make available to the settlers at their own expense. If a person causes a vote against (the provisions) of this stele (a breach), or if a speaker makes a request and tries to change or cancel something, the atomism and his sons, and his fortune shall be overthrown, and the tenth part of the goddess (Athena) shall fall, unless the settlers themselves... Those who can be enrolled as additional settlers, namely the soldiers, are to be found in "Brea '" as additional settlers after their return to Athens within thirty days. The Apoikie should be dispatched within thirty days. Aischines is to accompany the train and pay off the money ... Phantokles made the request: With regard to the Apoikie after Brea coincidence with what Demokleides applied for, the Phantokles is to let the Erechtheis-Prytanie before the Council at its next meeting. After Brea '(from the stratum) the settlers and settlers (settlers) are to move ...' '

== Literature and Sources ==
- Kai Brodersen, Wolfgang Günther, Hatto H. Schmitt: 'Historical Greek Inscriptions in Translation'. Volume I, Scientific Book Company, Darmstadt 2011 <! - page number missing ->.
- Inscriptiones Graecae (IG). Volume I³, No. 46 (original Greek text).
- Russell Meiggs, David Malcolm Lewis: A Selection of Greek Historical Inscriptions to the End of the Fifth Century B.C. Oxford 1989, no. 49 (translated as English).
- Eduard Meyer: History of Antiquity . Reprint, Darmstadt 1965, p. 670 <! - volume missing -> (interpretation of the Brea inscription in the sense of Plutarch).
- Michael Stahl; Society and State among the Greeks: Classical Period . Paderborn 2003, p. 231 (reprint and interpretation of the German translation by Brodersen, Günther, Schmitt).

== Links ==
- Brea inscription in the original
