= Theophane =

Daughter of Bisaltes in Greek mythology

In Greek mythology, Theophane (Ancient Greek: Θεοφάνη) was a daughter of Bisaltes.

== Mythology ==
In consequence of Theophane's extraordinary beauty, she was beleaguered by lovers, but was carried off by Poseidon to the isle of Crinissa. As the lovers followed her there, Poseidon metamorphosed both of them into sheep (the maiden into a ewe and himself into a ram), and turned all the inhabitants of the island into animals. As the lovers began to slaughter these animals, he changed them into wolves. The god then became, by Theophane, the father of the ram with the Golden Fleece, which carried Phrixus to Colchis.
