= Chaetae (town) =

Ancient town

Chaetae or Chaitai /ˈkɛti/ (Ancient Greek: Χαῖται) was a town of ancient Macedonia that Ptolemy assigns to Mygdonia. Its location cannot precisely be calculated from Ptolemy's account, which places it between Moryllus (nowadays Ano Apostoli, Kilkis regional unit) and Antigonia (Paeonia), which are some ways apart from one another. The town does not appear in the Periplus of the fleet of Xerxes, indicating a location perhaps north of the bay of Thessalonica, near Pontoiraklia, in a place where excavations took place (Tsaoussitsa). Some have identified the town as the Clitae (Κλῖται) – "Κλ" being substituted for "Χα" – in Ptolemy.
