= Carabia =

Town in ancient Macedonia

Carabia or Karabia (Ancient Greek: Καῤαβία), also known as Carrabia or Karrabia (Καῤῤαβία), was a town of ancient Macedonia, placed by Ptolemy in the district of Mygdonia. Its site is unlocated.
