= Asserus =

Town of Mygdonia in ancient Macedonia

Coordinates: 40°49′16″N 23°01′53″E

Asserus or Asseros (Ancient Greek: ἤ Ἄσσηρος), also known as Assorus or Assoros (Ἄσσορος), was a town of Mygdonia in ancient Macedonia.

The site of Asserus is tentatively located near modern Assiros.
