= Baerus =

Baerus or Bairos (Ancient Greek: Βαῖρος) was a town of ancient Macedonia, placed by Ptolemy in the district of Mygdonia. The name has also been passed down in the form Boerus.

Its site is unlocated.
