= Amphaxitis =

Historical region of Macedonia

Amphaxitis (Ancient Greek: Ἀμφαξῖτις) refers to the western maritime part of the Mygdonia district of Lower Macedonia, in Macedon, on Axius river.
