= Parthenopolis (Chalcidice) =

Ancient Greek settlement in Sithonia, Chalcidice, Macedonia

Coordinates: 40°07′54″N 23°52′20″E

Parthenopolis (Ancient Greek: Παρθενόπολις) was a settlement of Sithonia, Chalcidice, in ancient Macedonia.

The site of Parthenopolis is about 3 miles (4.8 km) east of Parthenon on the Sithonia peninsula.
