= Mount Athos =

Mountain and peninsula in northeastern Greece

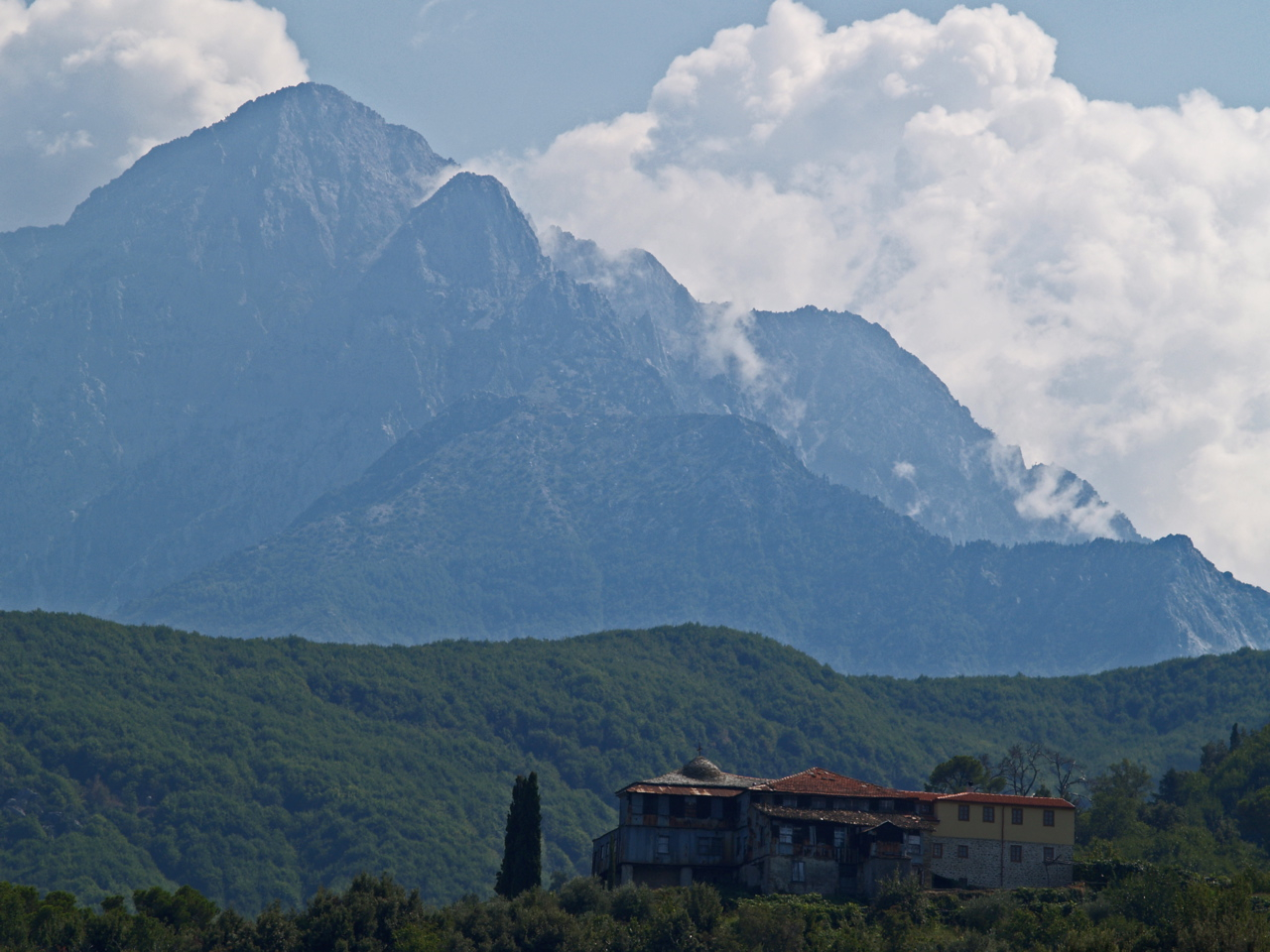

Highest point
- Elevation: 2,033 m (6,670 ft)
- Prominence: 2,012 m (6,601 ft)
- Listing: Ultra
- Coordinates: 40°09′30″N 24°19′38″E

Geography
- Location within Greece
- Location: Europe
- Country: Greece
- Region: Balkans

UNESCO World Heritage Site
- Type: Mixed
- Criteria: i, ii, iv, v, vi, vii
- Designated: 1988 (12th session)
- Reference no.: 454
- Region: Europe

Mount Athos (Note: /ˈæθɒs/; Greek: Ἄθως [ˈa.θos]) is a mountain on the Athos peninsula in northeastern Greece directly on the Aegean Sea. It is an important center of Eastern Orthodox monasticism.

The mountain and most of the Athos peninsula are governed as an autonomous region in Greece by the monastic community of Mount Athos, which is ecclesiastically under the direct jurisdiction of the Ecumenical Patriarch of Constantinople. The remainder of the peninsula forms part of the Aristotelis municipality. By Greek law and by religious tradition, women are prohibited from entering the area governed by the monastic community.

Mount Athos has been inhabited since ancient times and is known for its long Christian presence and historical monastic traditions, which date back to at least the 9th century during the Byzantine era. Because of its long history of religious importance, the well-preserved architecture of its monasteries, and the preservation of the natural environment of the peninsula, the monastic community of Mount Athos was inscribed on the UNESCO World Heritage List in 1988.

== Names ==
In the classical era, Mount Athos was called Athos and the peninsula Acté (in Latin) or Akté (Koine Greek: Ἀκτή). In modern Greek, the mountain is Oros Athos (Greek: Όρος Άθως) and the peninsula Hersonisos tou Atho (Χερσόνησος του Άθω), while the designation Agio Oros (Άγιο Όρος), translating to 'Holy Mountain', is also used.

Some languages of Orthodox tradition use names that translate to 'Holy Mountain', including Bulgarian, Macedonian and Serbian (Света Гора, Sveta Gora), and Georgian (მთაწმინდა, mtats'minda). However, not all languages spoken in the Eastern Orthodox world use this name: in the East Slavic languages (Russian, Ukrainian, and Belarusian) it is simply called Афон (Afon, meaning 'Athos'), while in Romanian it is called 'Mount Athos' (Muntele Athos or Muntele Atos).

== Geography ==
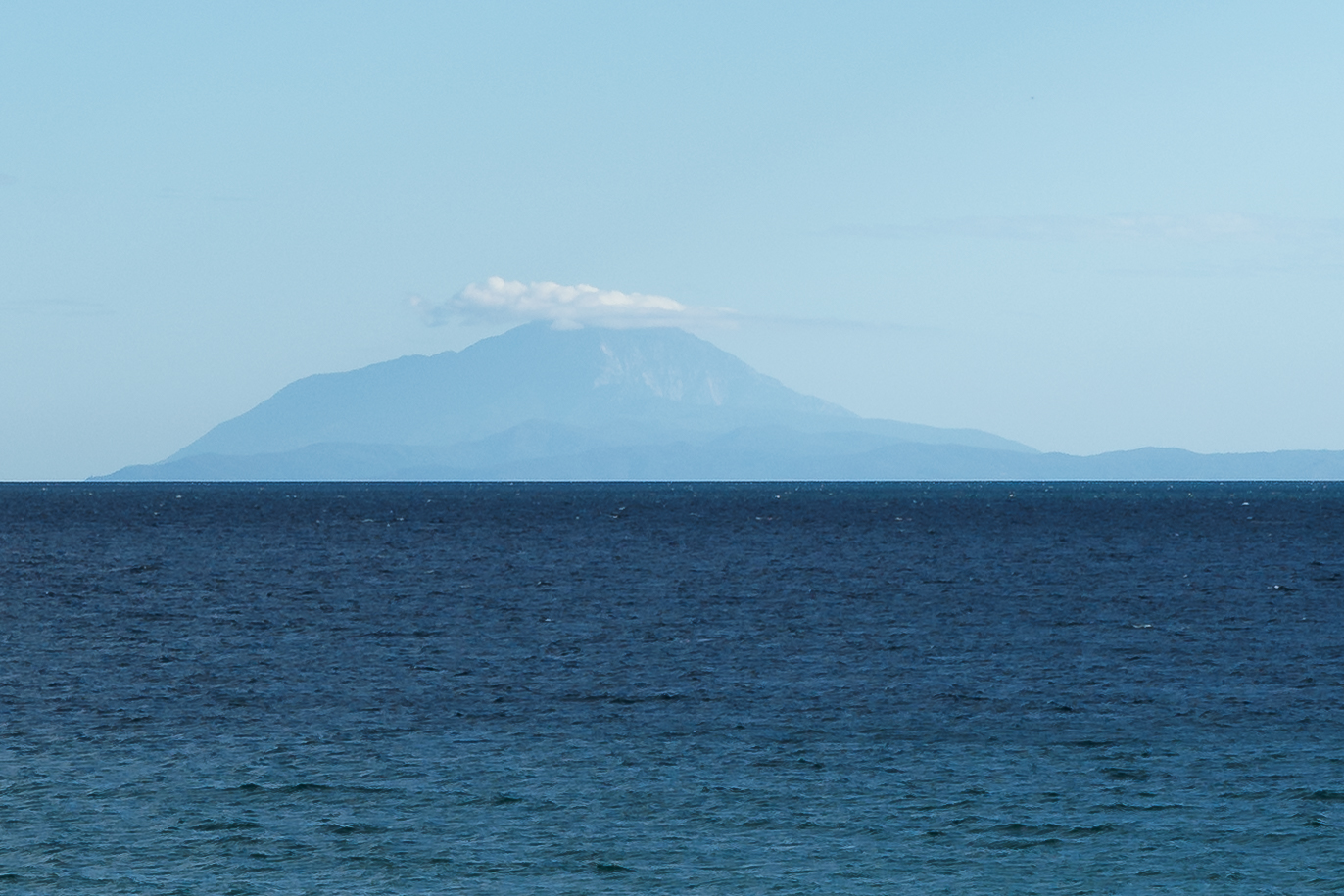
Mount Athos seen from the northwest

The peninsula, the easternmost "leg" of the larger Chalkidiki peninsula in central Macedonia, protrudes 50 km (31 mi) into the Aegean Sea at a width of between 7 and 12 km (4.3 and 7.5 mi) and covers an area of 335.6 km^{2} (130 sq mi). The actual Mount Athos has steep, densely forested slopes reaching up to 2,033 m (6,670 ft). The Athos peninsula, unlike Sithonia and Kassandra, is a geological continuation of the Rhodope Mountains of northern Greece and Bulgaria.

The surrounding seas, especially at the end of the peninsula, can be dangerous. In ancient Greek history, two fleet disasters in the area are recorded: Herodotus claimed that in 492 BC, Darius, the king of Persia, lost 300 ships under general Mardonius. In 411 BC the Spartans lost a fleet of 50 ships under the admiral Epicleas.

Mount Athos has an extensive network of footpaths, many of which date back to the Byzantine period. Many are typically not accessible to motor vehicle traffic.

== Flora ==
Much of Mount Athos is covered with mixed broadleaf deciduous and evergreen forests. Black pine (Pinus nigra) forests are found at higher elevations. Sclerophyllous scrub vegetation is also found throughout Mount Athos. Typical forest trees are sweet chestnut (Castanea sativa), holm oak (Quercus ilex), kermes oak (Quercus coccifera), Hungarian oak (Quercus frainetto), oriental plane (Platanus orientalis), black pine (Pinus nigra), and cedar (Calocedrus decurrens). Other common plant species include the strawberry tree (Arbutus unedo and Arbutus andrachne), cypress (Cupressus sempervirens), laurel (Laurus nobilis), lentisk (Pistacia lentiscus), phillyrea (Phillyrea latifolia), wild olive (Olea europaea), and heather (Erica spp.). Deciduous trees that are primarily found alongside streams include white willow, laurel, Oriental plane, and alder trees.

Aleppo pine (Pinus halepensis) is more commonly found in the northern part of the peninsula. Broadleaf maquis is found further south. Deciduous broadleaf forest dominated by sweet chestnut lies above the broadleaf maquis zone. There are also mixed forests consisting of deciduous oak trees, as well as limes, aspen, hop hornbeam, and maple. Black pine and stinking juniper can be found at higher elevations. Some herbaceous plants with tubers and bulbs include crocus, anemone, cyclamen, and fritillary species.

At least 35 plant species are endemic to Mount Athos, most of which are found in the area of the main summit in the south. Isatis tinctoria ssp. athoa, a woad subspecies, and Viola athois are named after Mount Athos.

Mount Athos is also home to 350 species of mushrooms.

== Fauna ==
Mammals include the grey wolf (Canis lupus), wild boar (Sus scrofa), red fox (Vulpes vulpes), jackal (Canis aureus), European badger (Meles meles), beech marten (Martes foina), stoat (Mustela erminea), weasel (Mustela nivalis vulgaris), European hedgehog (Erinaceus concolor), shrews (Crocidura spp.), and Mediterranean monk seal (Monachus monachus). Other mammal species include roe deer, hares, and red squirrels.

Birds include the black stork (Ciconia nigra), short-toed snake-eagle (Circaetus gallicus), golden eagle (Aquila chrysaetos), lesser kestrel (Falco naumanni), western capercaillie (Tetrao urogallus), Eurasian eagle-owl (Bubo bubo), yelkouan shearwater (Puffinus yelkouan), and Audouin's gull (Ichthyaetus audouinii). Other bird species include swifts, swallows, martins, nightingales, and hoopoes.

== History ==
A 3D model of Athos

=== Antiquity ===
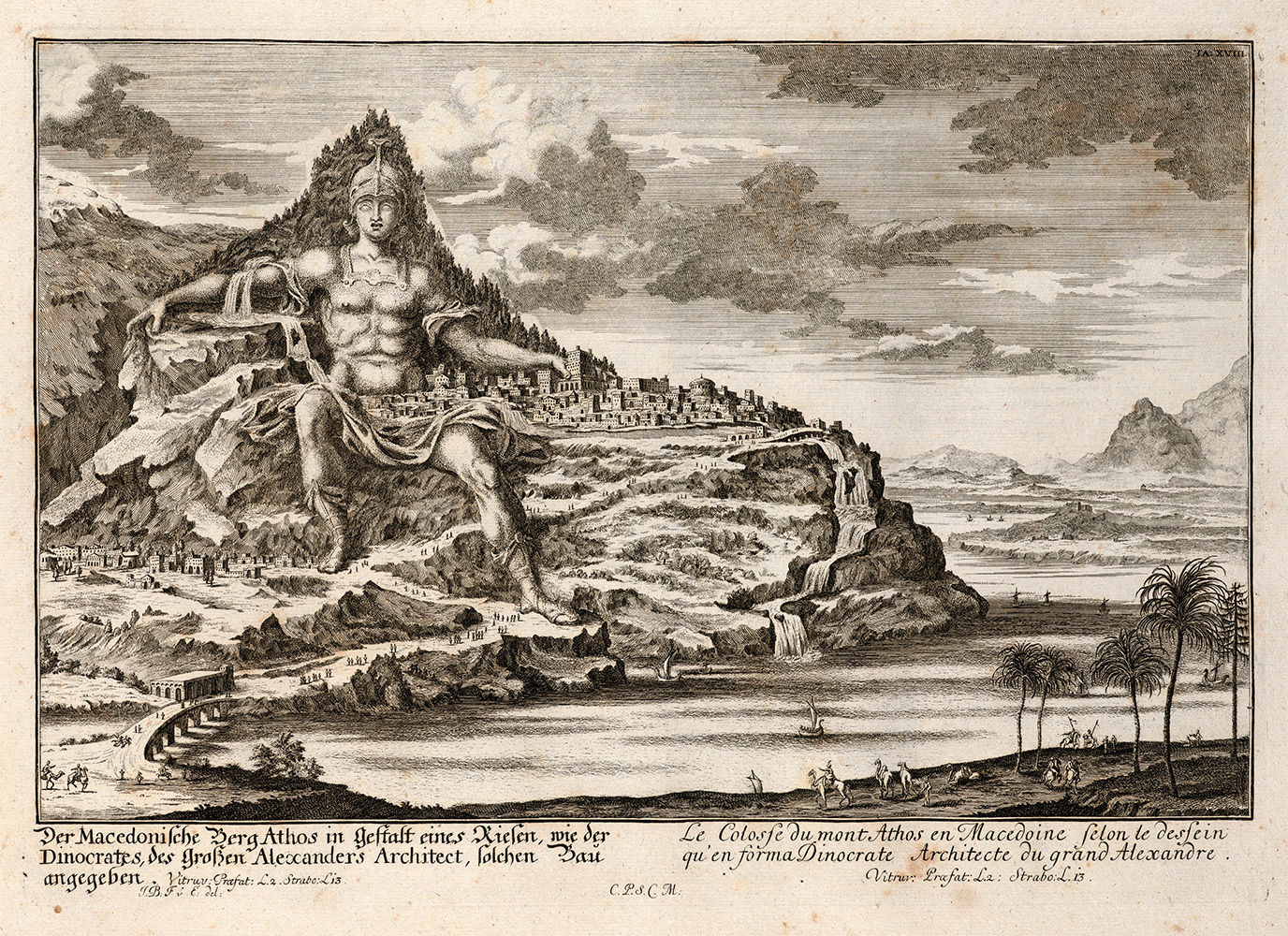
Imaginary view of the Alexander monument, proposed by Dinocrates; engraving by Johann Bernhard Fischer von Erlach, 1725

In Greek mythology, Athos is the name of one of the Gigantes that challenged the Greek gods during the Gigantomachia. Athos threw a massive rock at Poseidon which fell in the Aegean Sea and became Mount Athos. According to another version of the story, Poseidon used the mountain to bury the defeated giant.

Homer mentions the mountain Athos in the Iliad. Herodotus writes that during the Persian invasion of Thrace in 492 BC, the fleet of the Persian commander Mardonius was wrecked with losses of 300 ships and 20,000 men, by a strong North wind while attempting to round the coast near Mount Athos. Herodotus also states that Pelasgians from the island of Lemnos populated the peninsula, then called Akte, and names five cities thereon, Sane, Kleonai (Cleonae), Thyssos (Thyssus), Olophyxos (Olophyxus), and Akrothoon (Acrothoum). Strabo also mentions the cities of Dion (Dium) and Akrothoon. Eretria also established colonies on Akte. At least one other city was established in the Classical period: Akanthos (Acanthus). Some of these cities minted their own coins.

The peninsula was on the invasion route of Xerxes I, who spent three years excavating the Xerxes Canal across the isthmus to allow the passage of his invasion fleet in 483 BC. After the death of Alexander the Great, the architect Dinocrates (Deinokrates) proposed carving the entire mountain into a statue of Alexander.

Pliny the Elder stated in 77 AD that the inhabitants of Mount Athos could "live to their four hundredth year" due to the fact that they ate the skin of vipers.

The lack of historical accounts shrouds the history of the peninsula during the later ages. Archaeologists have not been able to determine the exact location of the cities reported by Strabo. It is believed that they must have been deserted when Athos's new inhabitants, the monks, started arriving sometime before the ninth century AD.

=== Early Christianity ===
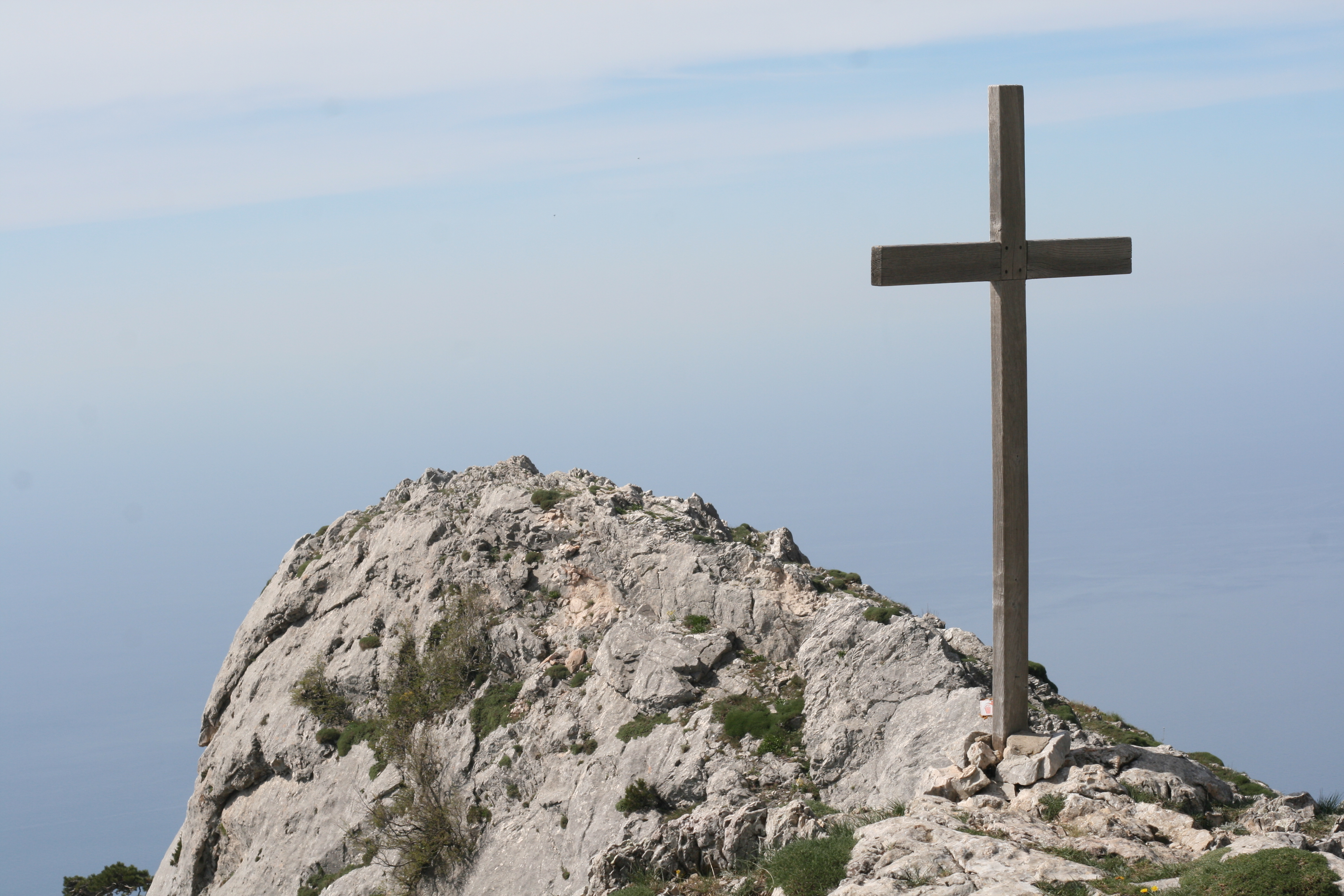
A cross on Athos Peak

According to the Athonite tradition, the Blessed Virgin Mary was sailing accompanied by John the Evangelist from Joppa to Cyprus to visit Lazarus of Bethany. When the ship was blown off course to then-pagan Athos, it was forced to anchor near the port of Klement, close to the present monastery of Iviron. The Virgin walked ashore and, overwhelmed by the mountain's wonderful and wild natural beauty, she blessed it and asked her son Jesus for it to be her garden. A voice was heard saying, "Ἔστω ὁ τόπος οὗτος κλῆρος σὸς καὶ περιβόλαιον σὸν καὶ παράδεισος, ἔτι δὲ καὶ λιμὴν σωτήριος τῶν θελόντων σωθῆναι" ("Let this place be your inheritance and your garden, a paradise and a haven of salvation for those seeking to be saved"). From that moment, the mountain was consecrated as the garden of the Mother of God and was out of bounds to all other women.

Historical documents on ancient Mount Athos history are very few. Monks have certainly been there since the fourth century, and possibly since the third. During Constantine I's reign (324–337) both Christians and followers of traditional Greek religion were living there.

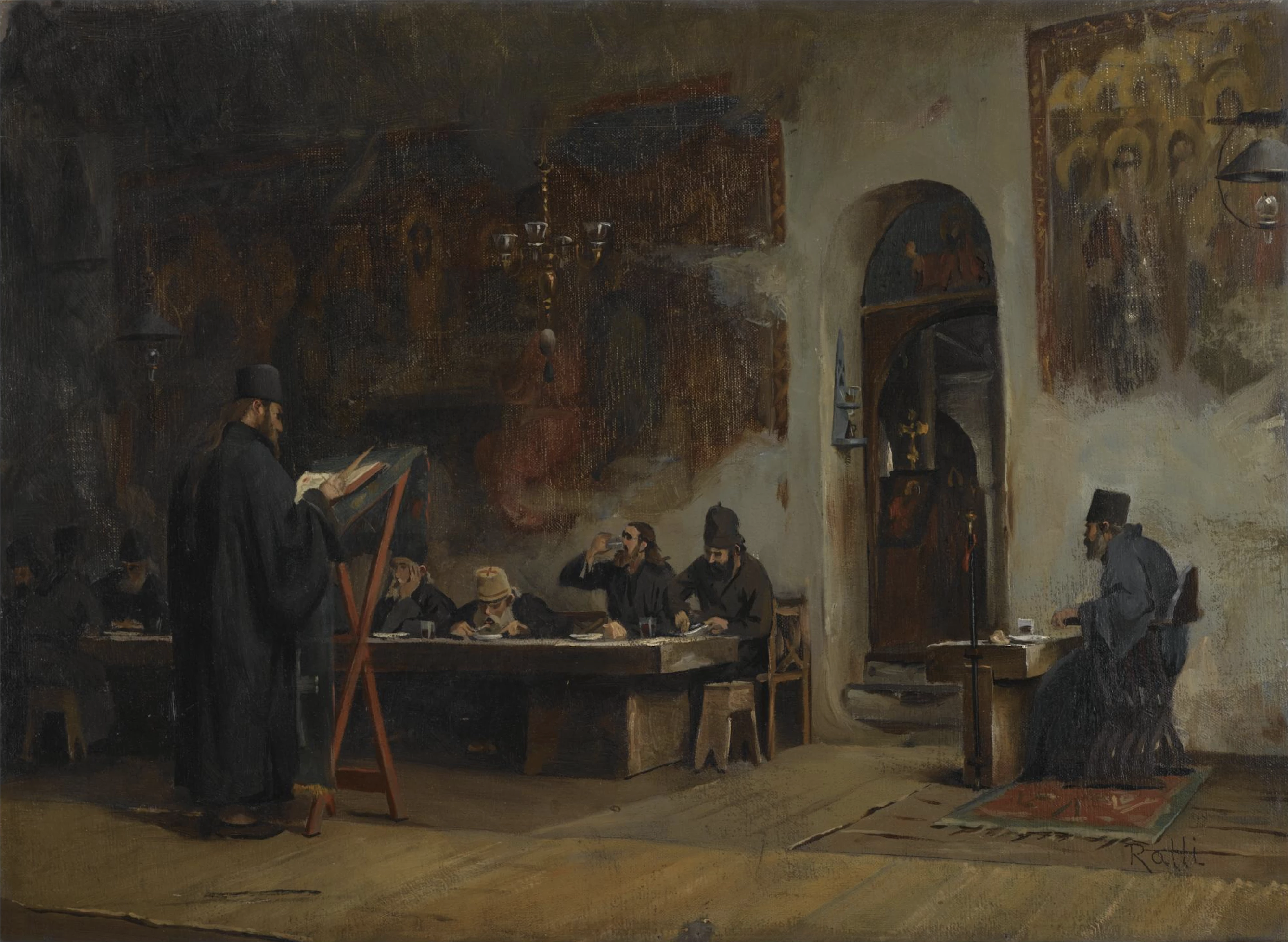
Refectory in a Greek Monastery, Mount Athos, by Théodore Jacques Ralli, 1885

During the reign of Julian (361–363), the churches of Mount Athos were destroyed, and Christians hid in the woods and inaccessible places.

Later, during Theodosius I's reign (379–395), the temples of the traditional Greek religion were destroyed. The lexicographer Hesychius of Alexandria states that in the fifth century, there was still a temple and a statue of "Zeus Athonite".

After the Islamic conquest of Egypt in the seventh century, many Orthodox monks from the Egyptian desert tried to find another calm place; some of them came to the Athos peninsula. An ancient document states that monks "built huts of wood with roofs of straw [...] and by collecting fruit from the wild trees were providing themselves improvised meals."

The biography of Saint Athanasius the Athonite describes the foundation of the first monastic community on Mount Athos.

=== Byzantine era and onwards ===
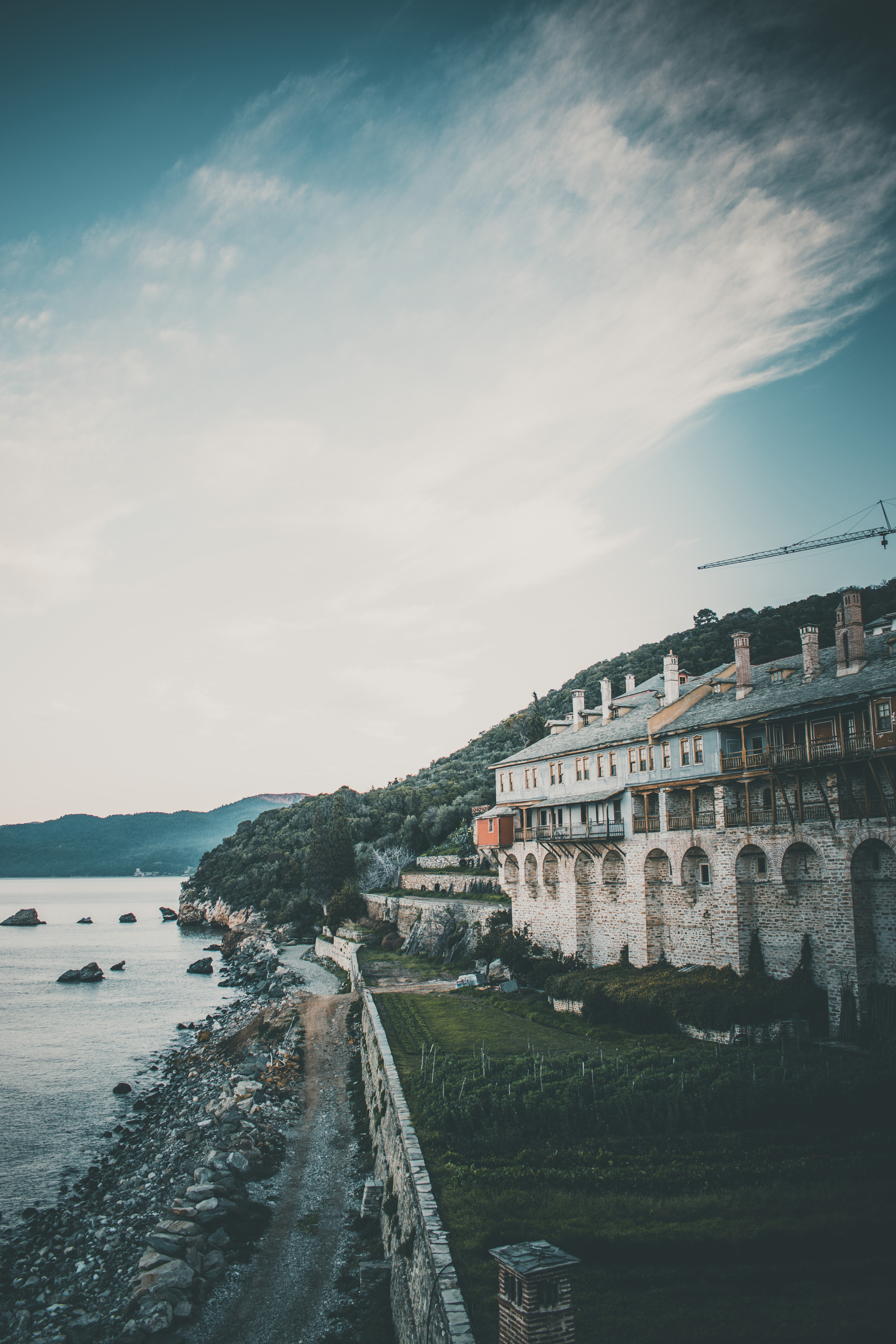
Xenophontos Monastery

Monastic life on Mount Athos expanded significantly during the Byzantine period. In the 9th century the area began to attract hermits and ascetics seeking isolation for religious devotion. By the 10th century organized monastic communities had developed, and the Byzantine emperors granted privileges and protection to the monastic settlements.

A major milestone in the institutional organization of the monastic community occurred in 963, when the monk Athanasius the Athonite founded the Great Lavra monastery with the support of the Byzantine emperor Nikephoros II Phokas. This foundation marked the transition from scattered hermitages to large cenobitic monasteries and became a model for later monastic institutions on the peninsula.

Throughout the Byzantine era, Mount Athos received patronage from emperors and rulers across the Orthodox world, including those of the Byzantine Empire, the Kingdom of Georgia, and various Slavic states. Several monasteries representing different Orthodox traditions were established, contributing to the multicultural character of the monastic republic.

After the fall of Constantinople in 1453 and the expansion of the Ottoman Empire, the monasteries of Mount Athos continued to function under Ottoman rule. The monastic community retained a degree of autonomy and preserved its religious institutions, although it faced periods of economic hardship and political instability.

During the 19th century the monastic population increased and the peninsula experienced a revival, supported by donations from Orthodox countries such as Russia, Serbia, and Romania. In the 20th century Mount Athos was incorporated into the modern Greek state while maintaining its special autonomous status as a monastic community within Greece.

Today Mount Athos remains an important center of Eastern Orthodox monasticism and is recognized as a UNESCO World Heritage Site.

=== Access ===
Access to Mount Athos is restricted and requires a special permit known as a diamonitirion. Entry is limited to male visitors and regulated by the monastic authorities in cooperation with the Greek state. Visitors typically arrive by boat from Ouranoupoli, which serves as the main gateway to the monastic community.

== See also ==
- Sacred mountains
- Okinoshima
- "Athos" . Encyclopædia Britannica. Vol. III (9th ed.). 1878. p. 14.
