= Bisaltia =

Ancient country in modern-day Greece

Coordinates: 40.9583°N 23.3861°E

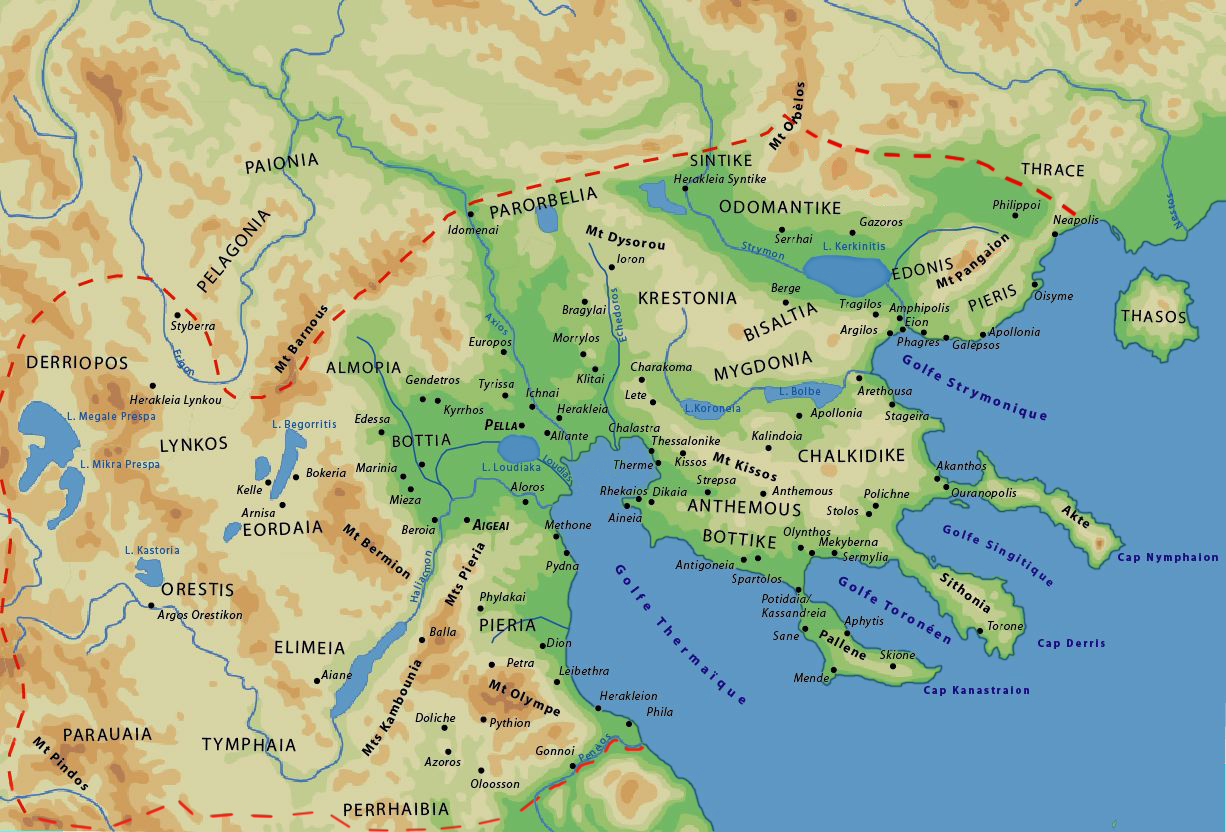
Map of the Kingdom of Macedon with Bisaltia located in the eastern districts of the kingdom.

Bisaltia (Greek: Βισαλτία) or Bisaltica was an ancient country which was bordered by Sintice on the north, Crestonia on the west, Mygdonia on the south and was separated by Odomantis on the north-east and Edonis on the south-east by river Strymon.The eponymous inhabitants, known as the Bisaltae, were a Thracian people. Later, the region was annexed by the kingdom of Macedon and became one of its districts. The most important town in Bisaltia was the Greek city of Argilos. There was also a river named Bisaltes in the region, which has not been certainly identified.

== History ==
Bisaltia, along with Crestonia, was ruled by a Thracian prince at the time of the invasion of Xerxes I of Persia, but by the onset of the Peloponnesian War it was annexed by Macedon.

In Roman times, Bisaltia crossed a branch of the via Egnatia, in which the Roman sources (Itineraria) mention four horses change stations : Trinlo (=Tragilos), Graero, Arason (=Arolos) and Euporia. In various sites of Bisaltia have been found so far several interesting inscriptions of imperial times.

Important towns of Bisaltia were Argilos, Berge and Brea.

Bisaltia is contained within the Serres regional unit and part of the Thessaloniki regional unit in Greece. The municipality of Visaltia is named after the ancient country.
