= Sane (Acte) =

Ancient Greek city in Chalcidice

Coordinates: 40°21′49″N 23°56′05″E

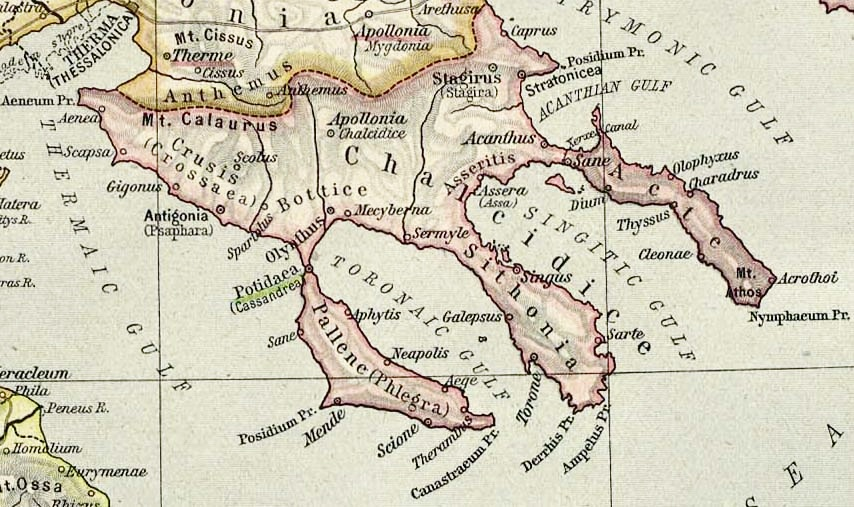
Chalcidice

Sane (Greek: Σάνη) was an ancient Greek city in the Acte headland (Mount Athos) of Chalcidice, situated upon the low, undulating ground, forming the isthmus which connects the peninsula of Acte with Chalcidice. It was founded by Andrians in the 7th century BCE. The ruins of the ancient city were found in the 21st century. Sane in Acte (or Athos) is mentioned by Herodotus in reference to the march of Xerxes I in Thrace, during the Second Persian invasion of Greece.

Some writers associate Sane with the later Uranopolis; Sane is located near modern Trypiti.

== Sources ==
- An Introduction to the Study of Grecian and Roman Geography by George Long, Robley Dunglison
- Archaeological Atlas of the Aegean
