= Edoni =

Thracian tribe

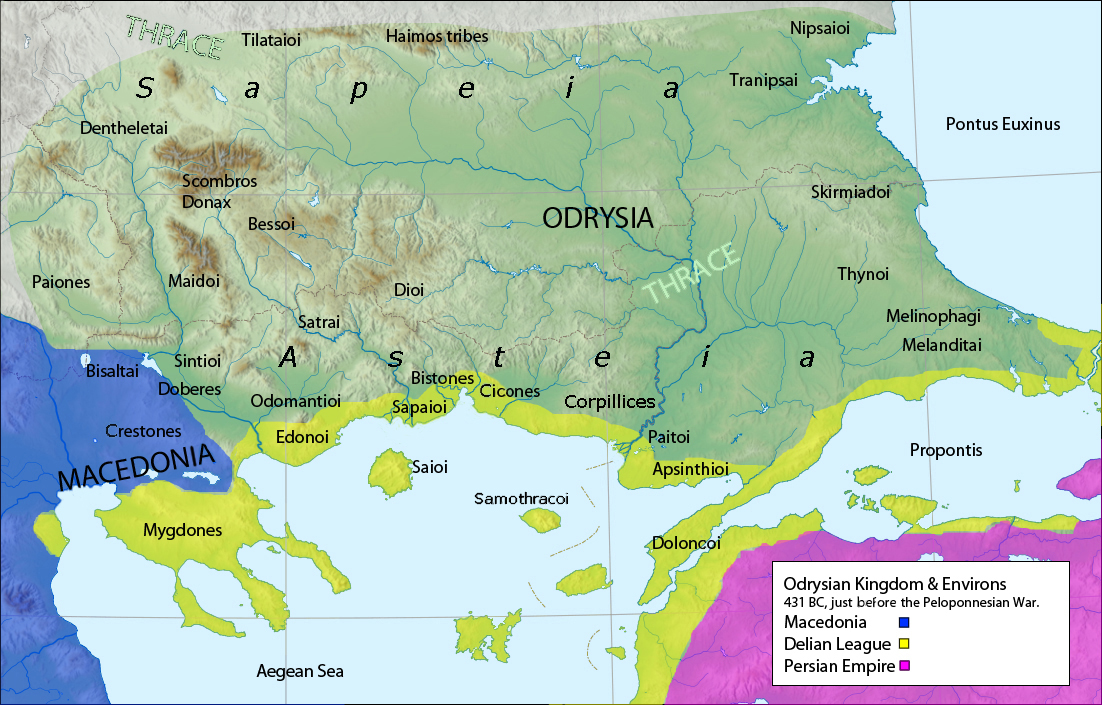
Approximate location of the Edones

The Edoni (also Edones, Edonians, Edonides) (Greek: Ἠδωνοί) were a Thracian tribe who dwelt mostly between the Nestus and the Strymon rivers in southern Thrace, but also once dwelt west of the Strymon at least as far as the Axios. They inhabited the region of Mygdonia before the Macedonians drove them out. After that, they settled in the region of Edonis which was named after them. There were a number of Edonian cities in the Classical era, including Drabeskos and Myrkinos.

== History ==
The strategically important Athenian colony of Ennea Hodoi ("Nine Ways", later Amphipolis) was taken by the Edonians shortly after the Persian Empire was driven from the area. The Edoni and the nearby Thracians defeated a massive Ionian invasion led by Athens 32 years later. The Athenians and their allies advanced far up the Angitis valley toward Drabescus before they were cut off and completely destroyed, losing 10,000 killed in the disaster. Athens wrested control of Amphipolis from the Edonians just prior to the Peloponnesian War. Brasidas liberated the city during that conflict and after a pro-Lacedaemonian coup d'état the Edonians became his allies. They made up most of his army when he defeated Cleon's offensive.

== Mythology ==
Edonus, was the mythical ancestor of the Edones.

Lycurgus, son of Dryas, was a mythical king of the Edoni, who drove Dionysus into exile in the Cyclades but was ultimately overthrown and killed by his own people. The conflict began with Lycurgus' opposition to either the drinking of wine or the worship of the new god. Lycurgus was based at the mouth of the Strymon River around Amphipolis. According to one version of the story, he was imprisoned at Mt. Pangaeum by the Edoni and then torn apart by his horses on Dionysius' orders. The Edoni were celebrated for their orgiastic worship of Bacchus (Dionysus). In Latin poems, the term Edonis signified a female Bacchanal. The Peresadyes, forerunners of the dynasty of Bardyllis that ruled over the Dardanii, were most likely Edones.

== See also ==
- List of Thracian tribes
- Lycurgus (Thrace)
