= Crestonia =

Historical region of Macedonia, Greece

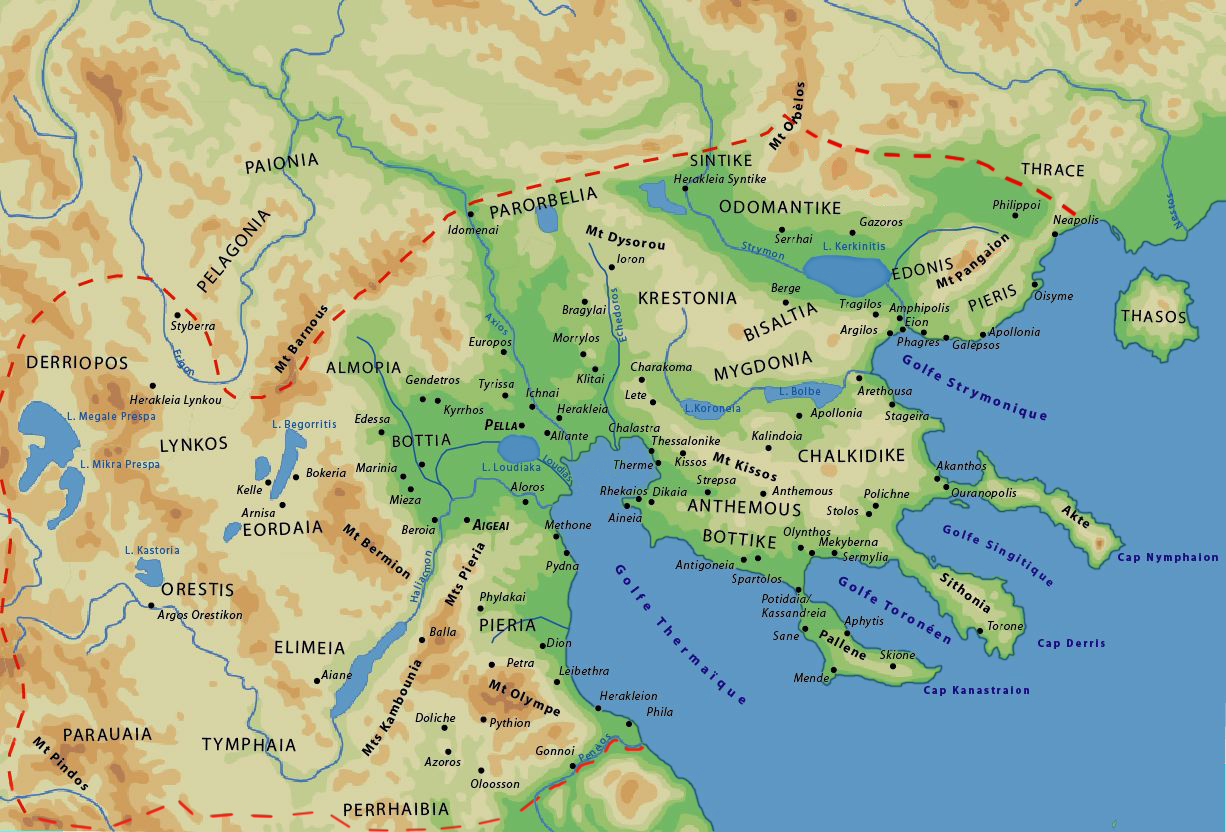
Map of the Kingdom of Macedon with Crestonia located in the central-eastern districts of the kingdom.

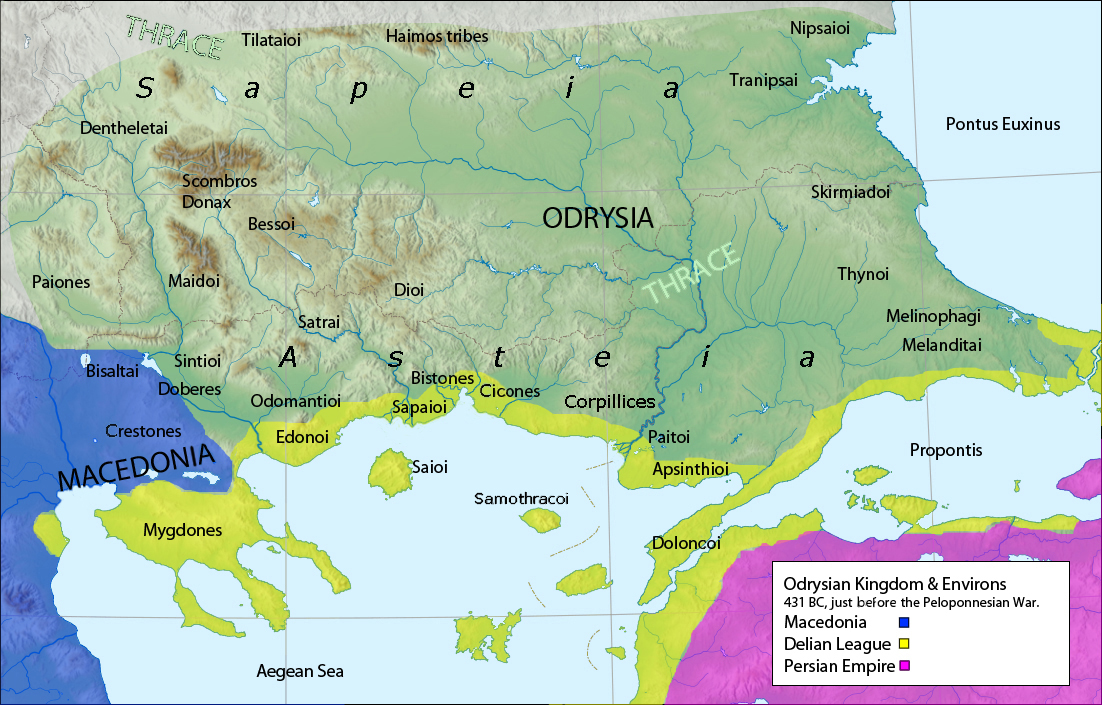
Approximate location of the Krestones

Crestonia (or Crestonice) (Greek: Κρηστωνία) was an ancient region immediately north of Mygdonia. The Echeidorus river, which flowed through Mygdonia into the Thermaic Gulf, had its source in Crestonia. It was partly occupied by a remnant of the Pelasgi, who spoke a different language from their neighbors (Thracians and Paeonians); later the Greeks. The main towns of Crestonia were Creston (Crestone) and Gallicum (Romanized name). The region, along with Mygdonia, was held by Paeonians for a time, later by Thracians. At the time of the invasion of Xerxes I of Persia, Crestonia was ruled by an independent Thracian prince (Herodotus, 8. 116). By the time of the commencement of the Peloponnesian War, Crestonia had been annexed to the kingdom of Macedonia.

Today, ancient Crestonia is comprehended within the regional units of Kilkis and Thessaloniki (northern part) in Greece.
