= Europos =

Europos or Europus (Greek: Εὐρωπός) can refer to:

- Europus, a son of the mythological Makedon and Oreithyia

== Places and jurisdictions ==
in Asia

- Dura-Europos alias Cirablus, an Ancient city and former bishopric in modern-day Syria, now a Latin Catholic titular see
  - Dura-Europos synagogue, a synagogue in the above city
- Europus, the ancient name of Carchemish in northern modern-day Syria
- Europus, the ancient name of Euromus in ancient Caria, modern-day Turkey
- A less known temporary name of Rey, Iran: the successors of Alexander rebuilt the town "Rhages" and renamed it "Europos"

in Europe

- Europus (Almopia), a town of Almopia, in ancient Macedonia
- Europus (Macedonia), a town in ancient Macedonia, near the site of the modern town below
  - Evropos municipality in modern Macedonia

== See also ==
- Europa (disambiguation)
- Europe (disambiguation)
