= Macedonian Folklore Museum =

Folklore Museum of Goumenissa
- Λαογραφικό Μουσείο Γουμένισσας
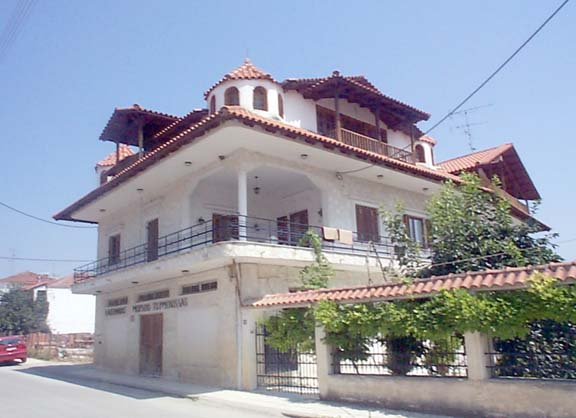
- Outside view
- Established: 1991
- Location: Goumenissa, Greece
- Coordinates: 40.948145864129216°N 22.447329968535815°E
- Type: Art museum
- Founders: Christos and Katerina Alevras

The Folklore Museum of Goumenissa (Greek: Λαογραφικό Μουσείο Γουμένισσας), also known as the Macedonian Folklore Museum (Mακεδονικό Λαογραφικό Μουσείο) or Alevras' Folklore Museum (Λαογραφικό Μουσείο Αλευρά), is located in Goumenissa, a town in the Kilkis regional unit of Central Macedonia, Greece, 85 km from Thessaloniki.

== History ==
It was founded in 1991 by Christos and Katerina Alevras. It is housed in a new two-storey building on 18 Dimitriou Kakkavou St. and its purpose is to preserve the folk tradition and culture and initiate the younger generation into the secrets and beauties of folk culture.

== Exhibits ==
On the ground floor are displayed folk costumes—men's and women's formal and everyday wear—from all over Macedonia, including Sarakatsan and Thracian costumes and the uniform of a Macedonian freedom fighter. There are also hand-embroidered silks and handwoven woollen bedding, together with domestic furniture, utensils both decorative and utilitarian of the nineteenth century, numerous documents of the nineteenth century and personalia of Macedonian freedom fighters. Naturally, the museum also has traditional agricultural implements (a plough, mattocks, water troughs, gin traps) and the accoutrements of weaving (a loom, spinning wheels, spindles, shuttles).

In the basement are some impressive barrels for wine and the local raki known as tsipouro, together with various artefacts connected with traditional winemaking; and there is also a display of locally made clay vessels.

== Gallery ==
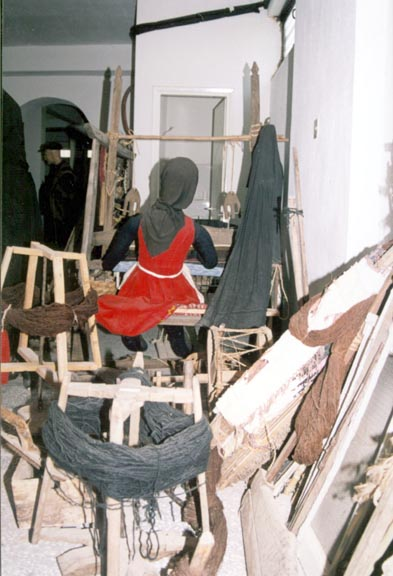
A loom

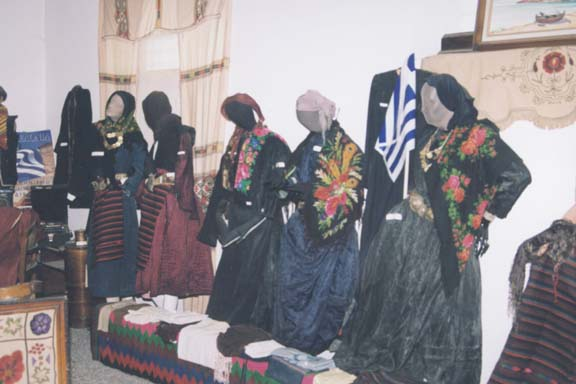
Women local costumes

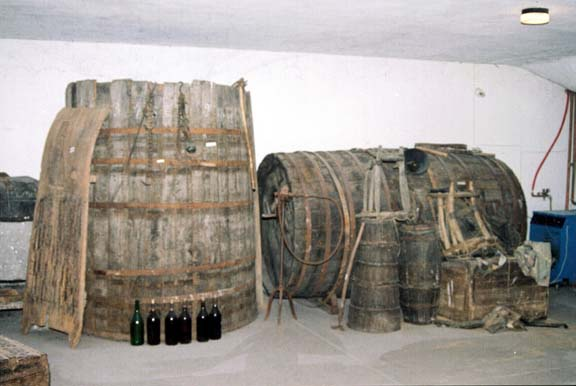
Impressive wine barrels

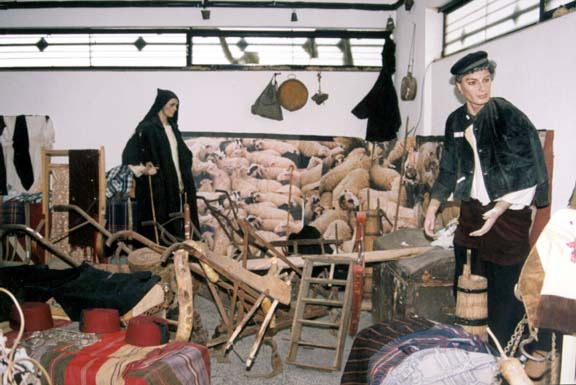
Traditional agricultural implements
