= Griva (disambiguation) =

Griva was a Serbian and Yugoslav hard rock band.

Griva may also refer to:

Places

- Griva, Kilkis, village in Greece
- Griva, Babushkinsky District, Vologda Oblast, rural locality in Russia
- Grīva, part of the city of Daugavpils, Latvia

People

- Lauma Grīva (born 1984), Latvian athlete
- Māra Grīva (born 1989), Latvian athlete
