= Ivan Alev =

Bulgarian doctor

- Born: c. 1851; Goumenissa, Ottoman Empire, now Greece
- Died: 15 February 1919 (aged 67–68); Nevrokop, Bulgaria
- Organization(s): IMARO, IMRO

Ivan Alev (Bulgarian: Иван Алев) was a Bulgarian medical doctor and a worker of the Bulgarian national liberation movement in Macedonia.

He was born in about 1851 in the small south Macedonian town of Gumendzhe, in the Ottoman Empire, now Goumenissa, Kilkis regional unit, Greece. He finished medicine in Athens and then returned to his native town, where he started to work as a doctor. He was one of the first doctors who worked in Bulgarian Exarchate School system in Ottoman Macedonia. Later he moved to Kukush (Kilkis). Alev was a trusted man of Internal Macedonian-Adrianople Revolutionary Organization (IMARO) and had the responsibility to treat the sick and wounded members of the Organization. During the wars for Bulgarian national unification, Alev was a military division doctor in the Bulgarian army. After the First World War he settled in Nevrokop as a regional doctor. He died in 1919.
