= Europus (Macedonia) =

Ancient city in Greece

Coordinates: 40°53′10″N 22°33′16″E

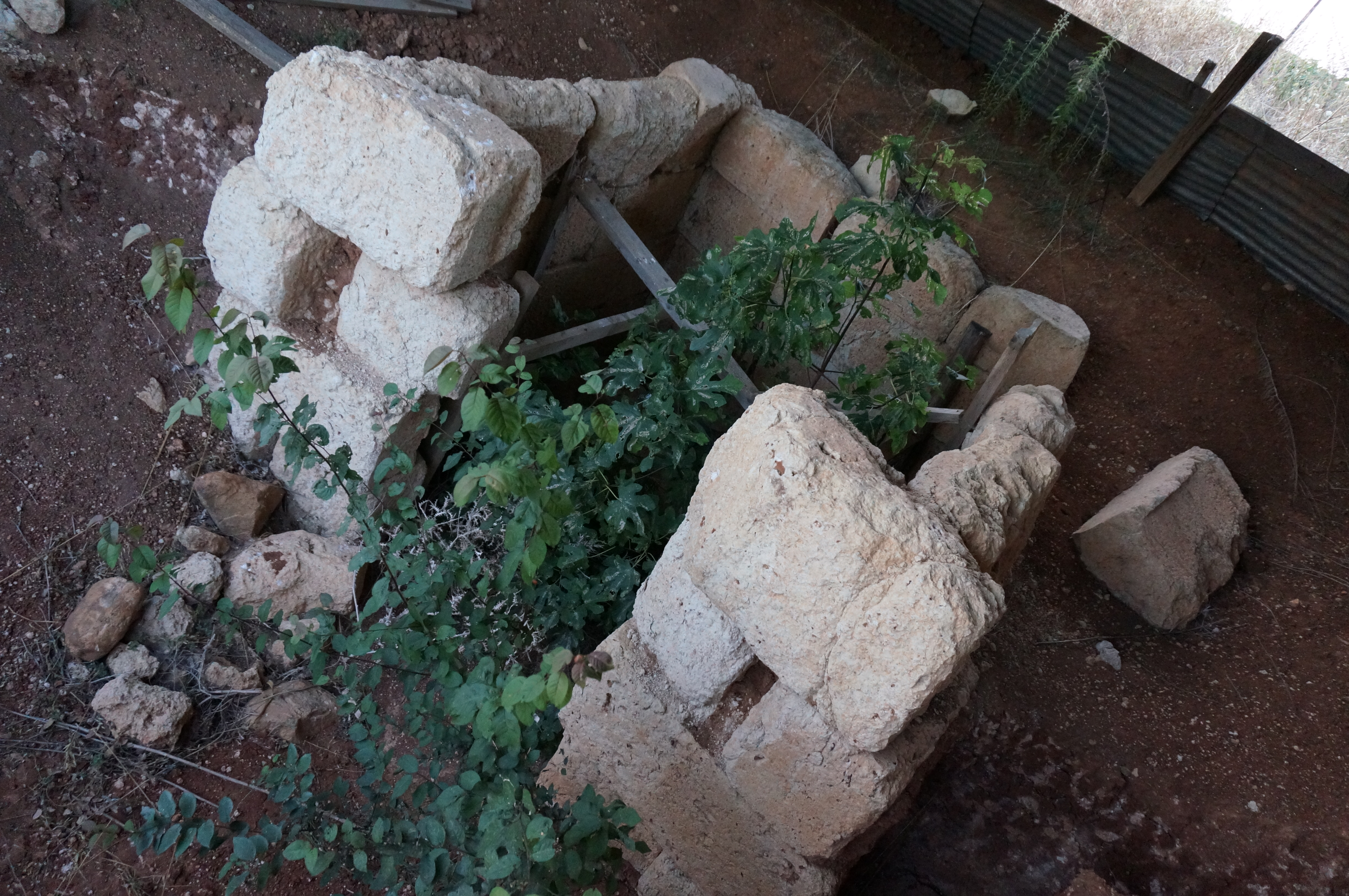

Europus or Europos (Ancient Greek: Εὐρωπός) was a town in Bottiaea (later named Emathia), ancient Macedonia. It was located between Idomenae and the plains of Cyrrhus and Pella, situated on the right bank of the Axius below Idomene, where modern Evropos lies. Not far above the entrance of the great maritime plain, the site of Europus has been recognised by that strength of position which enabled it to resist Sitalces and the Thracians. We have the concurring testimony of Ptolemy and Pliny that this town of Emathia was different from Europus of Almopia.

Europos was the birthplace of Seleucus I Nicator, and two cities in Seleucid Empire were named Europos. There is also reported a Delphic proxenos Machatas from Europos in the late 4th century BC.

The site of Europos is near the modern Evropos.

== Bibliography ==
- The Classical Gazetteer, 1851, p. 152
- An inventory of archaic and classical poleis, 2004, p. 802 ISBN 0-19-814099-1
- Seleukos Nikator by John D. Grainger, 2013, p. 4 ISBN 0-415-04701-3
