= Nikolaos Davelis =

Greek participant in the Macedonian Struggle

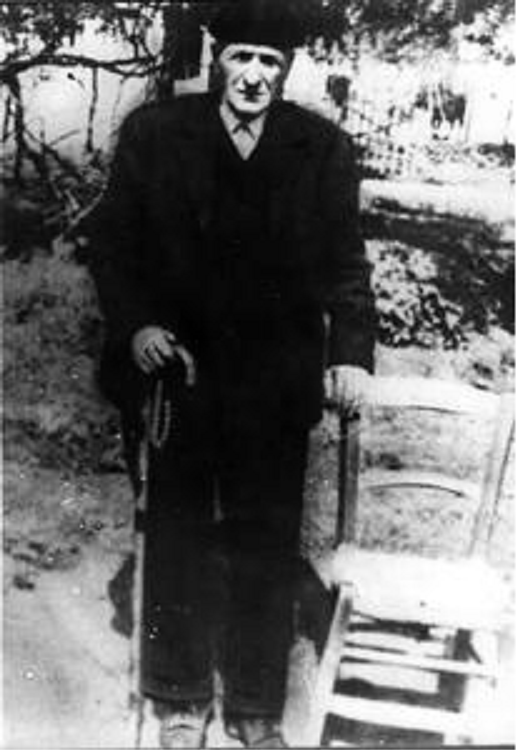
- Nikolaos Davelis in the mid 20th century.
- Native name: Νικόλαος Νταβέλης
- Born: c. 1880s Livadia, Salonika Vilayet, Ottoman Empire (now Greece)
- Allegiance: Kingdom of Greece
- Service / branch: HMC
- Battles / wars: Macedonian Struggle; Battle of Valia Siaca

Nikolaos Davelis (Greek: Νικόλαος Νταβέλης) was a significant Greek participant in the Macedonian Struggle.

== Biography ==
Davelis was born and raised in Livadia, Kilkis in the 1880s. His family was well known for their national war participations which dates back to 1821. He formed and led an armed group. He collaborated with his fellow soldiers Stergios Naoum, Anastasios Bellis Kulina and Nikolaos Nessios. He also worked with Konstantinos Garefis several times. In 1906, in the Battle of Valia Siaca, between Livadia and Ossiani (now Archangelos), he was arrested with other Macedonomachoi by the Ottoman authorities and imprisoned in Heptapyrgion of Thessaloniki. In 1908, with the revolution of the Young Turks, a general amnesty was granted and he was freed.
