= Machatas of Europos =

Macedonian proxenos of Delphians

Machatas, son of Sabattaras from Europos, was a Macedonian proxenos of Delphians in late 4th century BC. As the inscription says: "the Delphians gave proxenia, euergesia (benefaction), promanteia (priority in consulting the oracle), proedria (privilege of reserved seats at the theatre), prodikia (the right to priority in a trial) to Machatas and his descendants, the same as it is given to every proxenos". The decree is issued by archon Hierondas and bouleutai (chancellors) Heraklidas, Eualkeus and Echyllos.
