= Mouries =

Mouries Μουριές
- Municipal unit
- Location within the regional unit

- Location within Greece
- Coordinates: 41°15′N 22°47′E
- Country: Greece
- Administrative region: Central Macedonia
- Regional unit: Kilkis
- Municipality: Kilkis

Area
  - Municipal unit: 138.7 km^{2} (53.6 sq mi)

Population (2021)
  - Municipal unit: 1,846
  - Municipal unit density: 13.31/km^{2} (34.47/sq mi)
  - Community: 431
- Time zone: UTC+2 (EET)
  - Summer (DST): UTC+3 (EEST)
- Vehicle registration: ΚΙ

Mouries (Greek: Μουριές) is a village and a former municipality in the Kilkis regional unit, northern Greece. Since the 2011 local government reform it is part of the municipality Kilkis, of which it is a municipal unit. The municipal unit has an area of 138.660 km^{2}. Population 1,846 (2021). The seat of the municipality was in Stathmos Mourion (Mouries Station). During the Macedonian Struggle, the inhabitants of the Mouries area fought hard against the Bulgarian enemy. Stavros Pallas, a Greek Macedonian fighter from Mouries, was one of the great fighters in the area.
