= Palatiano =

Village in Central Macedonia, Greece

Palatiano Παλατιανό
- Settlement
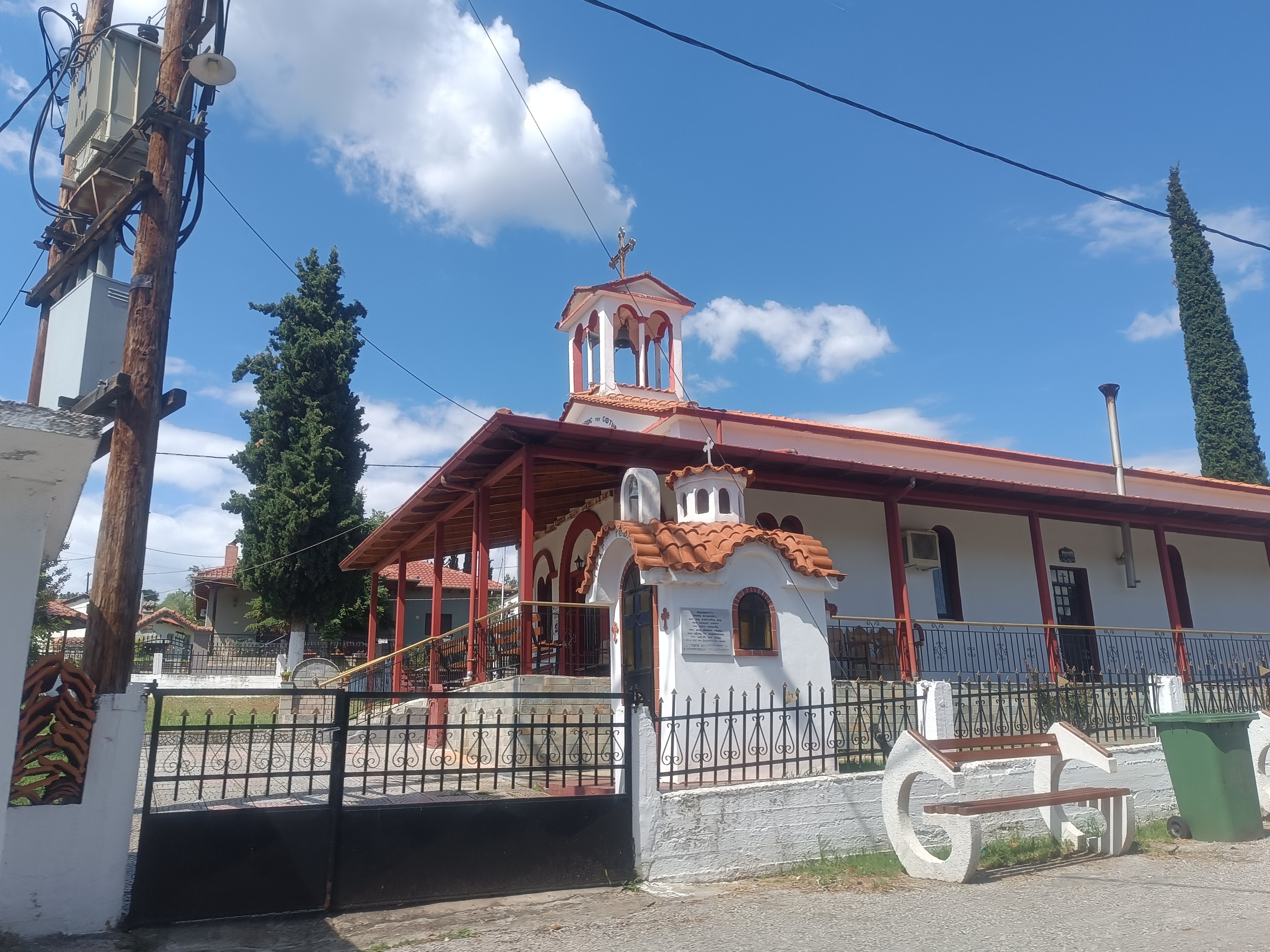
- The church in Palatiano

- Location within Greece
- Coordinates: 41°08′06″N 22°54′47″E
- Country: Greece
- Administrative region: Central Macedonia
- Regional unit: Kilkis
- Municipality: Kilkis
- Municipal unit: Kroussa
- Community: Gerakario
- Elevation: 380 m (1,250 ft)

Population (2021)
  - Total: 31
- Time zone: UTC+2 (EET)
  - Summer (DST): UTC+3 (EEST)

Palatiano (Greek: Παλατιανό, before 1927: Σαραϊλή Saraili) is a small village in the Kilkis regional unit of Central Macedonia, Greece. It is most known for the archaeological site located nearby, which consists of a notably preserved city that peaked during the 1st to 3rd centuries CE.

== History ==
Palatiano was known as Saraili (Σαραϊλή) before 1927 and it was located within the territory of the Ottoman Empire until 1913, when it was ceded to Greece in the Treaty of Bucharest that ended the Balkan Wars. Its inhabitants were Turkish up until 1923, when they were transferred to Turkey during the population exchange between Greece and Turkey following the Greco-Turkish War of 1919–1922. In their place settled Pontic Greeks, 20 families numbering 65 people in total.

== Archaeological site ==
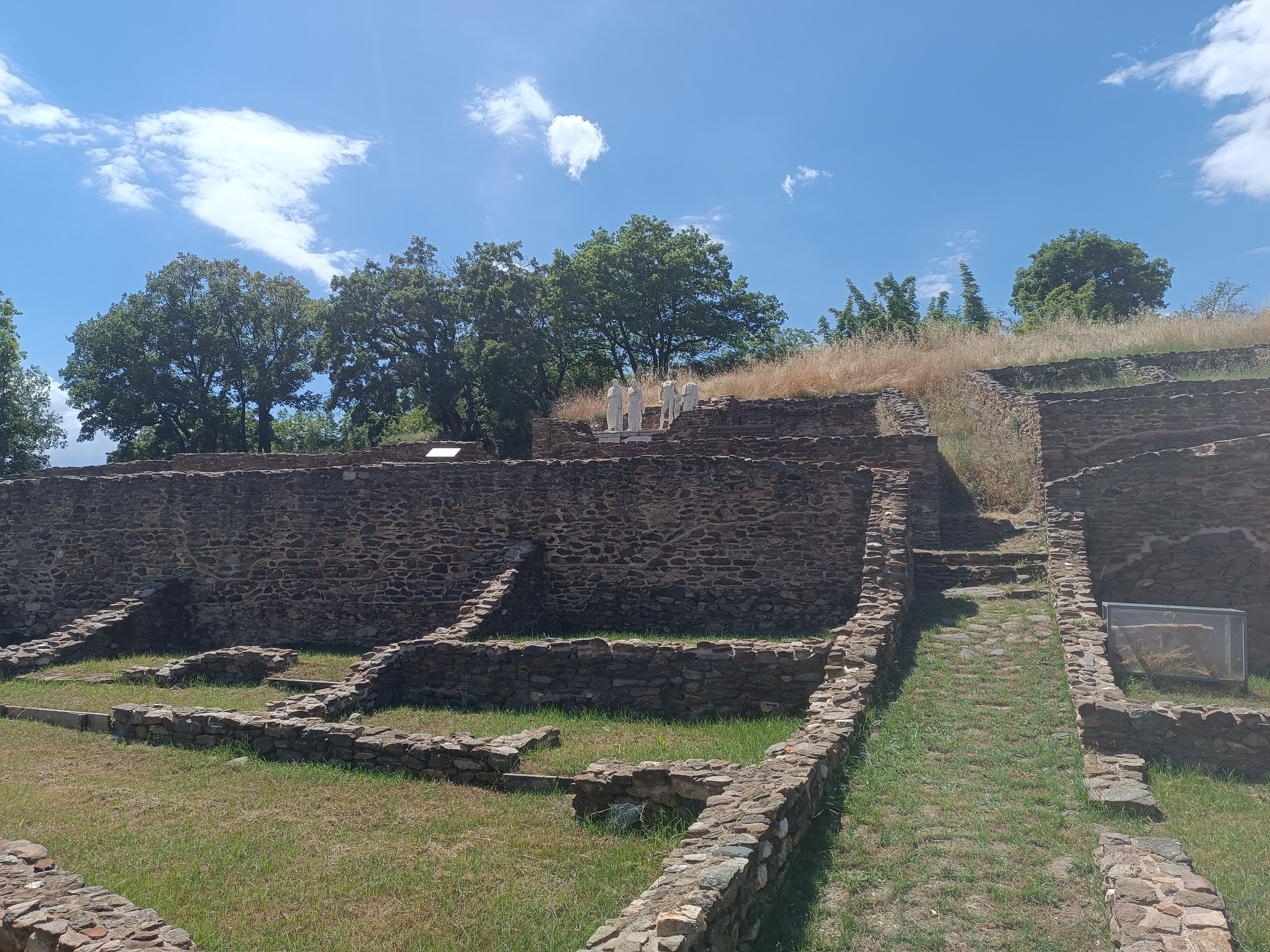
View of the archaeological site of Palatiano.

The archaeological site of Palatiano is located near the village and consists of a well preserved ancient city, estimated to have been established sometime during the 10th century BCE and it peaked during the Roman period from the 1st century CE until the 3rd century CE, when it was destroyed for unknown reasons. The site has been identified by some researchers as the ancient city of Ioron (Ancient Greek: Ἴωρον), though such claims have not been confirmed. Among the most prominent findings of the site are four statues each depicting a member of a family which was possibly of royal descent. They were discovered by accident in 1960 and were the first artifacts to be discovered there. The originals are now located in the Archaeological Museum of Kilkis, while copies of them have been placed at the original site. The first archaeological excavations took place there the following year, in 1961, while more followed in 1965, 1966 and 1977. The systematic research of the site started in 1993 and continued until the end of that decade, while some additional excavations were carried out up until 2003.

== Gallery ==
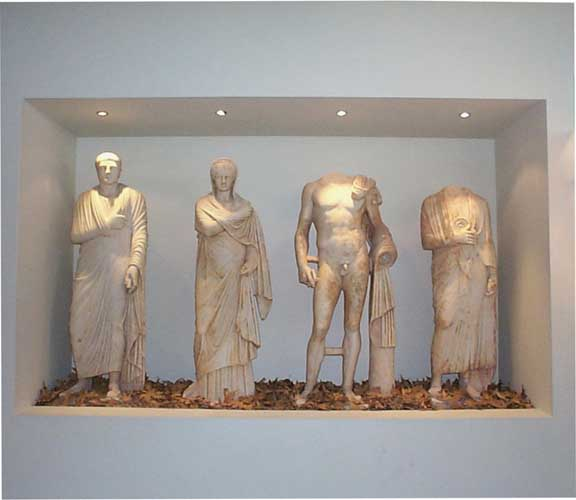
The original statues discovered in Palatiano, on display at the Archaeological Museum of Kilkis.

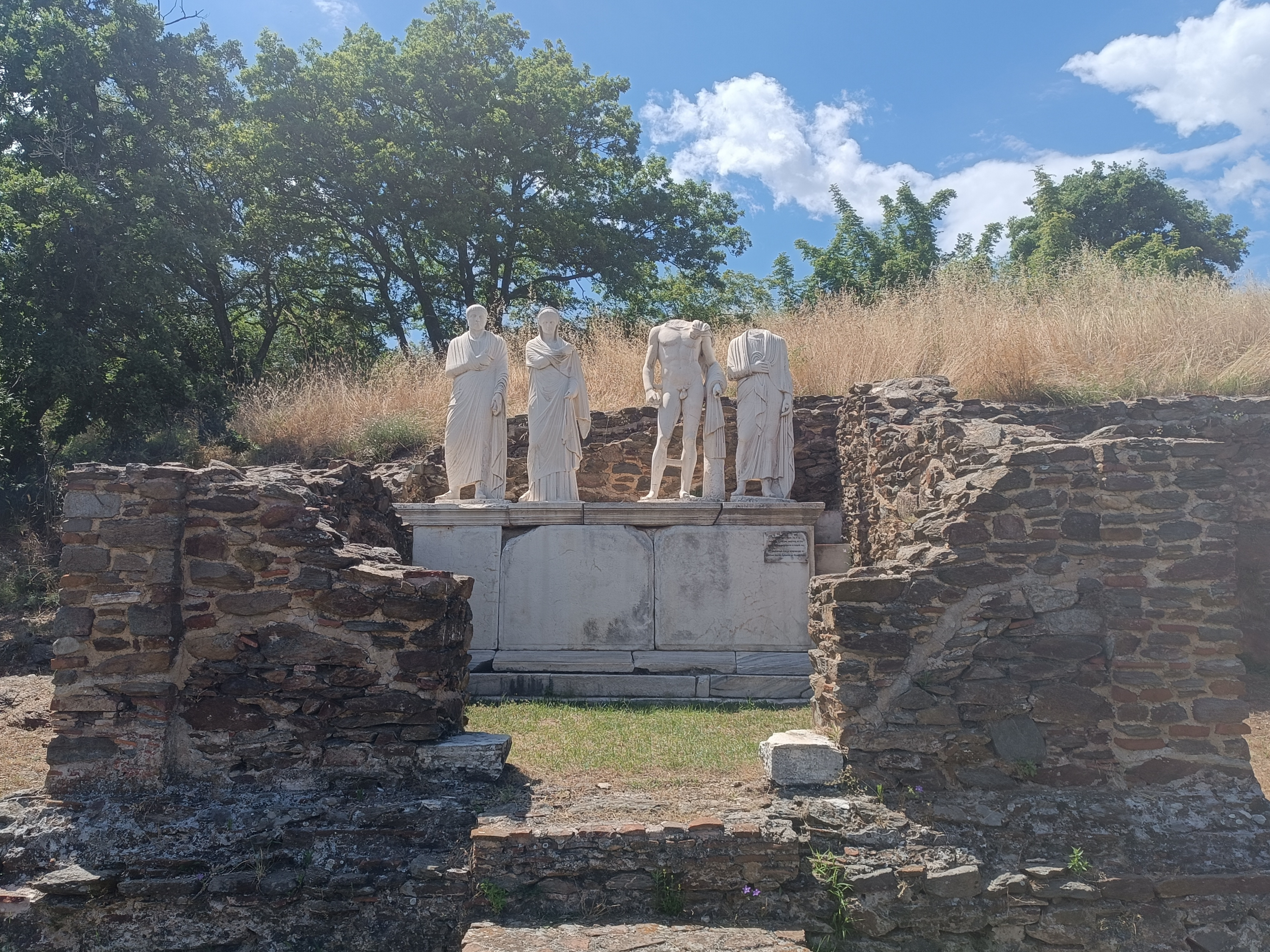
Copies of the statues on display at the archaeological site.

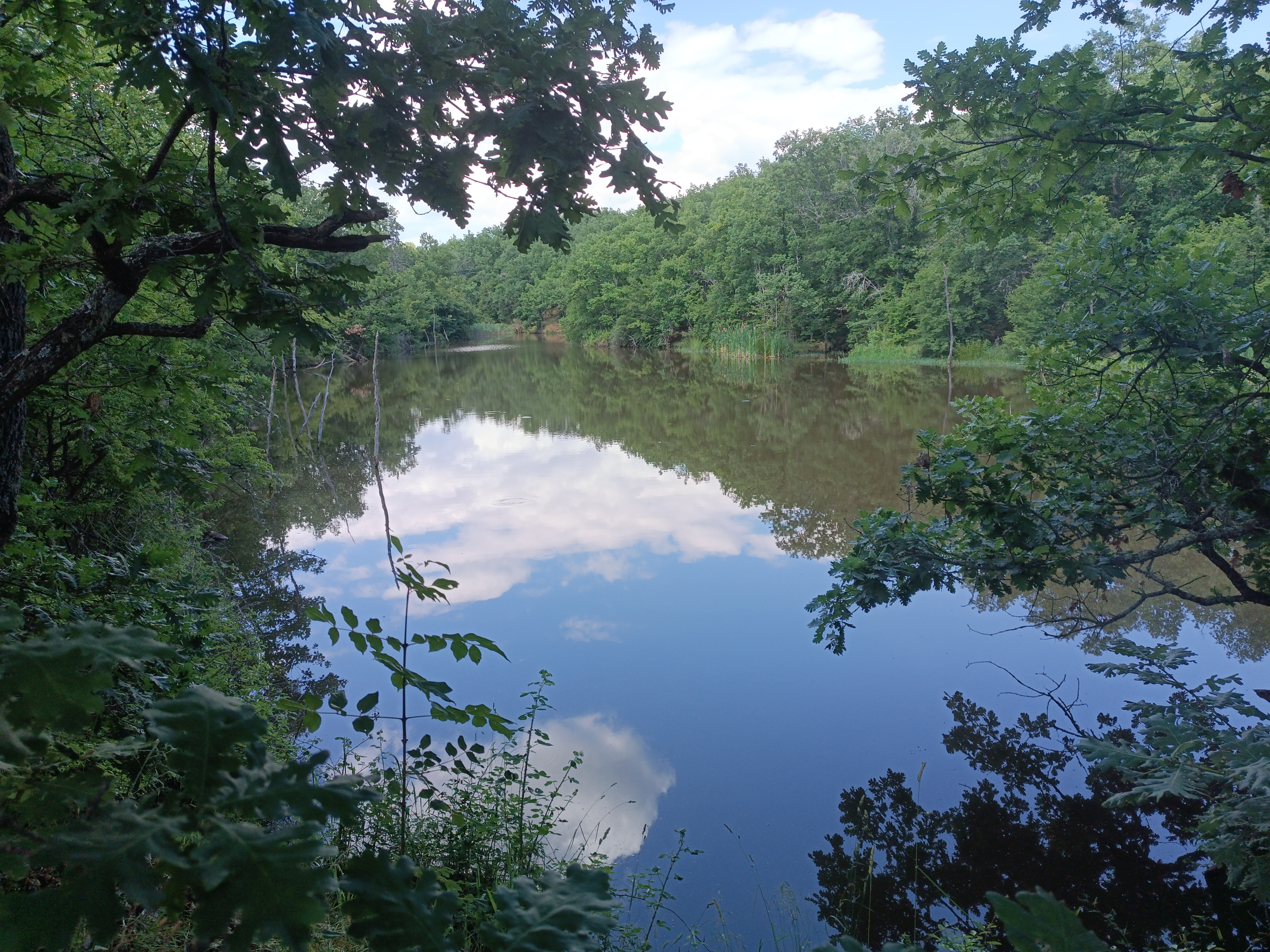
View of a small lake located near the village.
