= Archaeological Museum of Kilkis =

Museum in Kilkis, Greece

Coordinates: 40.9976°N 22.8777°E

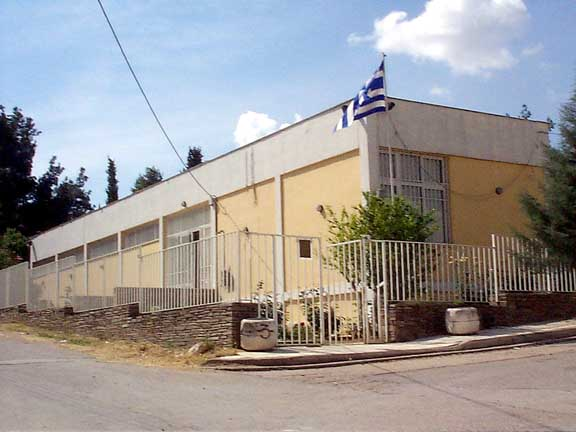
Outside view

The Kilkis Archaeological Museum is located in the city of Kilkis in Central Macedonia, Greece. It opened in 1972, its purpose being to collect finds handed in by private individuals and unearthed during excavations in the Kilkis area. The exhibits are arranged in the rooms in chronological order, they date from the Neolithic to the Roman period, and they come from excavations in the settlement of Kolchida, the cemetery at Palaio Gynaikokastro, the archaeological site at Filyria, and other parts of the Kilkis Prefecture.

In the entrance hall are the prehistoric finds from the excavations at Tsaousitsa and Axiochori, and occasional finds (stone statuettes and amulets) from Pedino, Gallikos, and Axioupoli. The first hall has Iron Age finds, the most important of which are the funerary urns, the bronze jewellery, and the iron weapons from the cemetery at Palaio Gynaikokastro. In the second hall are sculptures, inscriptions, and grave stelai of the Classical, Hellenistic, and Roman periods. The most important exhibits are the Kouros from Evropos, which represents a young man and dates to the 6th century BC, and the four statues from the heroon at Palatiano (2nd century AD). The room also contains clay figurines, pots, and some outstanding jewelry.

== Gallery ==
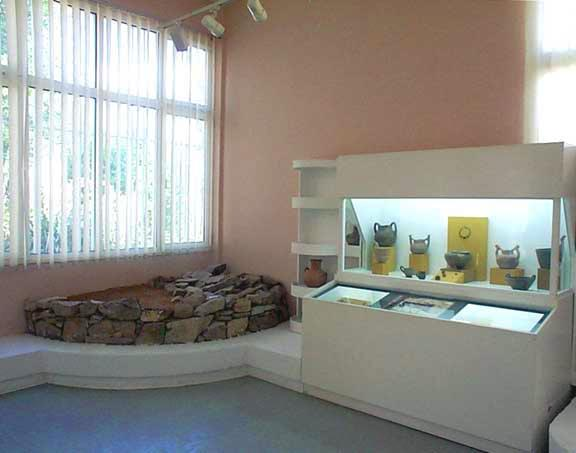
Prehistoric Exhibits from Excavation in Kilkis Area

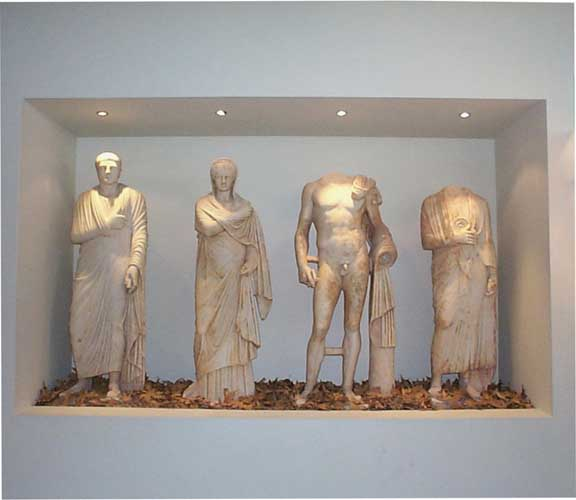
Four Statues from the Heroon at Palatiano

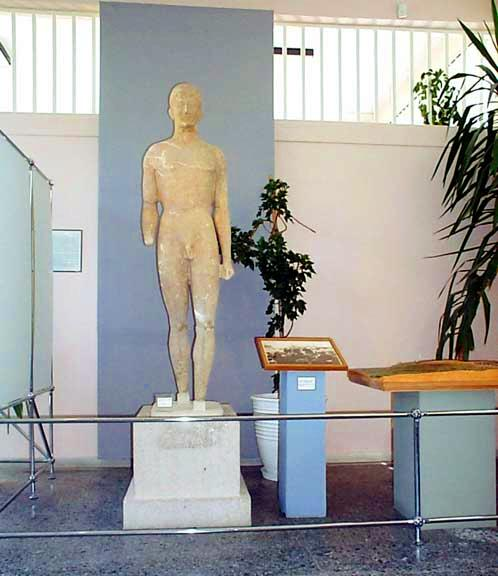
Kouros of Evropos.

== Sources ==
- This article incorporates text from the corresponding article at the Museums of Macedonia website, commissioned by the Macedonian Heritage foundation, written by Vlasis Vlasidis, and published under a CC-BY-SA-3.0 license.
