= Griva, Kilkis =

Griva Γρίβα
- Community
- Location within Greece
- Coordinates: 40°56.16′N 22°24.00′E
- Country: Greece
- Administrative region: Central Macedonia
- Regional unit: Kilkis
- Municipality: Paionia
- Municipal unit: Goumenissa

Area
  - Community: 21.357 km^{2} (8.246 sq mi)
- Elevation: 460 m (1,510 ft)

Population (2021)
  - Community: 587
  - Density: 27.5/km^{2} (71.2/sq mi)
- Time zone: UTC+2 (EET)
  - Summer (DST): UTC+3 (EEST)
- Postal code: 613 00
- Area code: 2343
- Vehicle registration: KI
- Website: http://www.griva-kilkis.blogspot.gr (Greek)

Griva (Greek: Γρίβα, Bulgarian and Macedonian: Крива, Kriva) is a village located in the Kilkis regional unit in Central Macedonia, Greece. The village hovers on the southeastern portion of Mount Paiko at 460 m (1,510 ft) above sea level.

Griva, with a population of 587 people (2021), is the largest village in the municipal unit of Goumenissa besides Goumenissa proper.

Because of the complete destruction of the village by the Ottomans in 1912 during the First Balkan War, there are no structures still existing that were built prior to this period. The village's architecture is the basic standard architecture for nearly all of the towns of the region, with narrow streets, small passageways between the buildings, and cottages fit perfectly into the natural environment of the mountainside. According to a Yugoslav study, in 1961 of a population of 1,280, an estimated 1,180 Macedonian speakers lived in the village alongside 100 Pontic Greeks.

== Demographics ==
Historical population
Year	Pop.	±%
1981	861	—
1991	779	−9.5%
2001	782	+0.4%
2011	770	−1.5%
2021	587	−23.8%

The snow-covered landscape of Griva, including the church of St. Athanasius the Great, located in the center

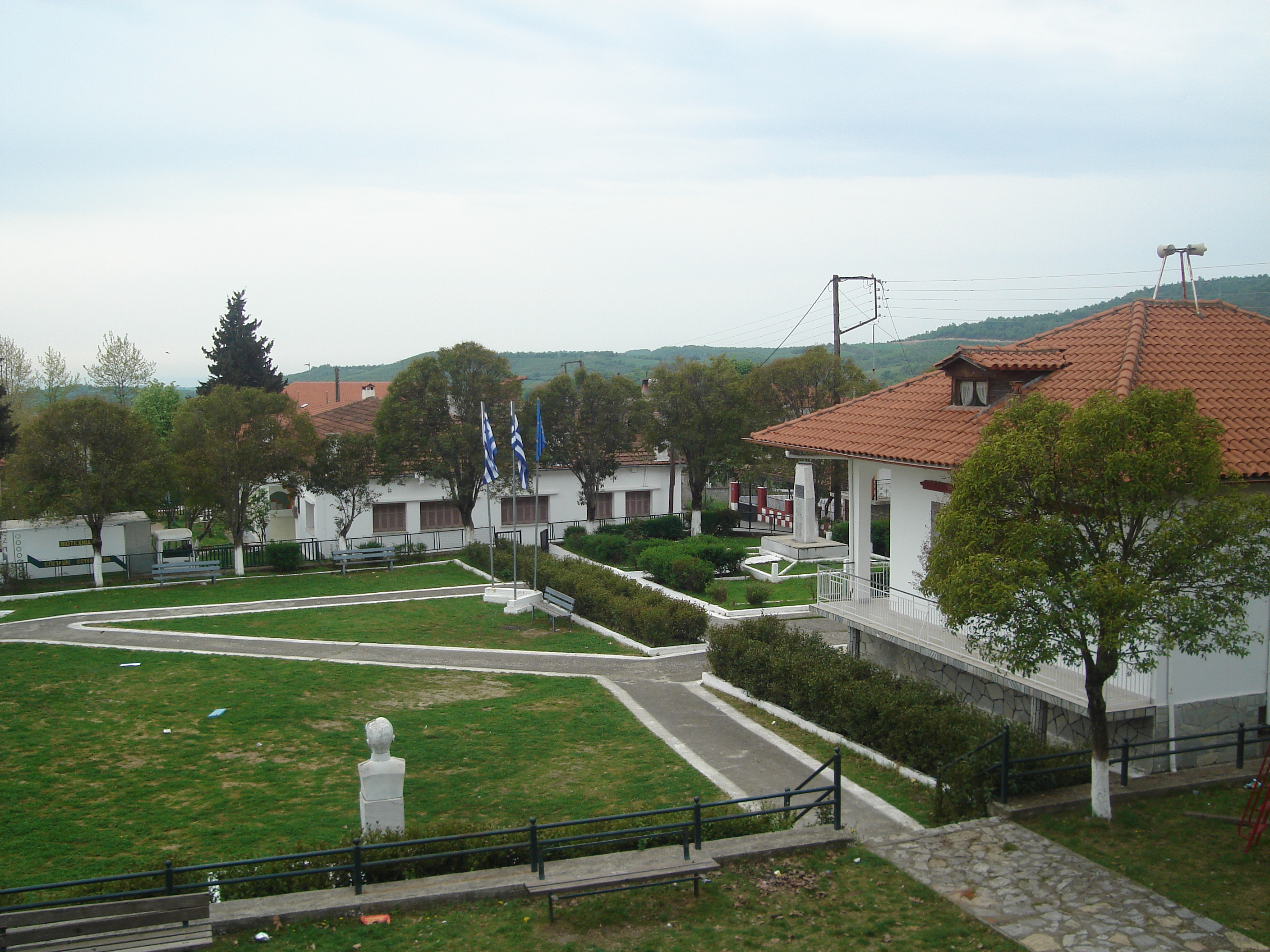
View of the town hall.

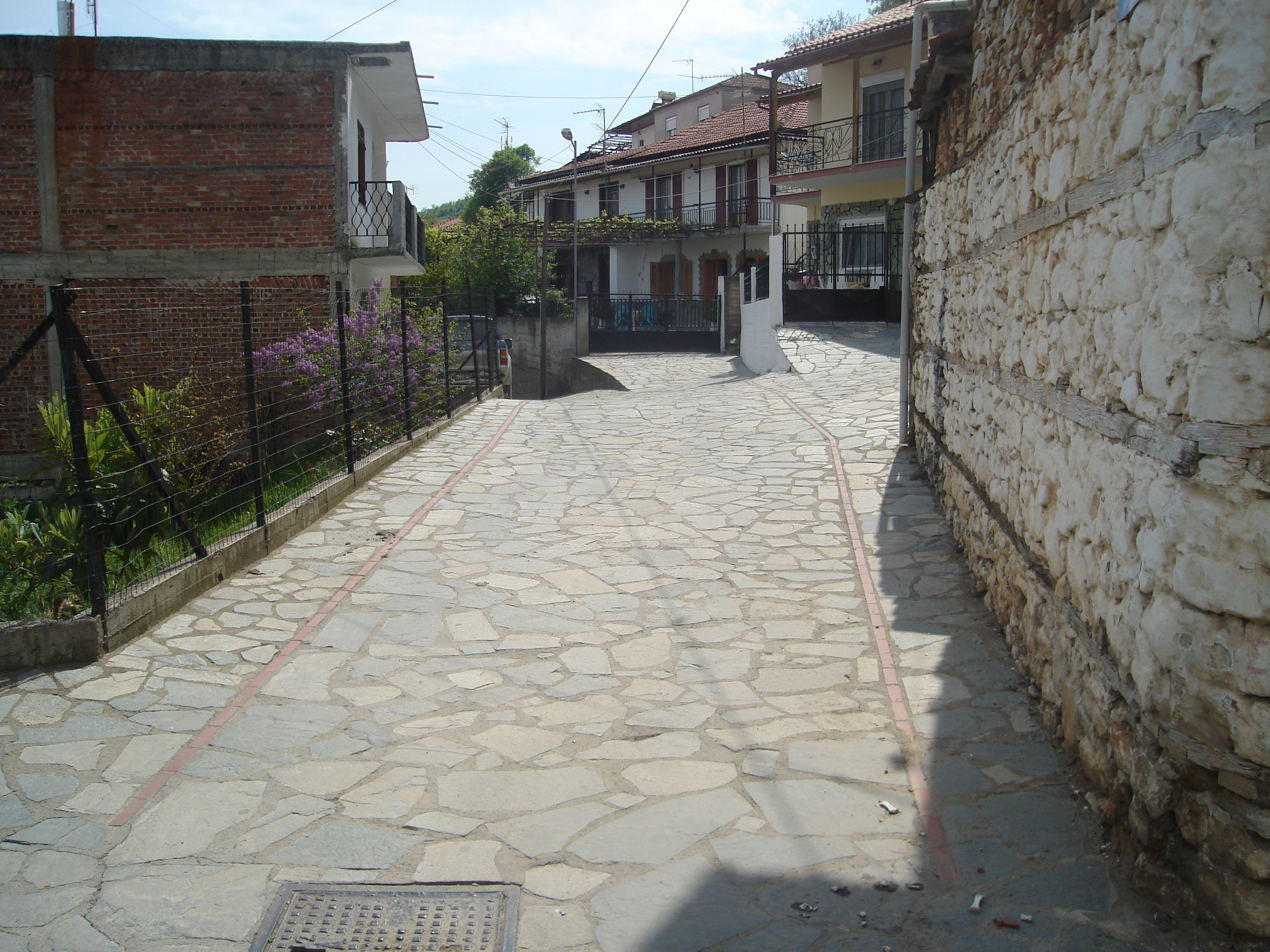
Street

== Location ==
Griva is located 72 kilometers (45 mi) northwest of Thessaloniki, 542 kilometers (337 mi) north of Athens and is located within the Municipality of Goumenissa.

== Economy ==
Local agriculture produces chestnuts, sheep, and timber.

== Education ==
Griva had one primary school and one elementary school but they both closed down due to the low number of students.

== Culture ==
Filmography: In 1981, director Tasos Psaras filmed The Factory (Greek : Το Εργοστάσιο)(French : L 'Ucine) in various places within Griva.

== Churches ==
- Church of St. Athanasius the Great
- Monastery of St. Raphael, Nicholas & Irene at Griva (established 1992).
