= Goumenissa =

Town in Central Macedonia, Greece

Goumenissa Γουμένισσα
- Municipal unit
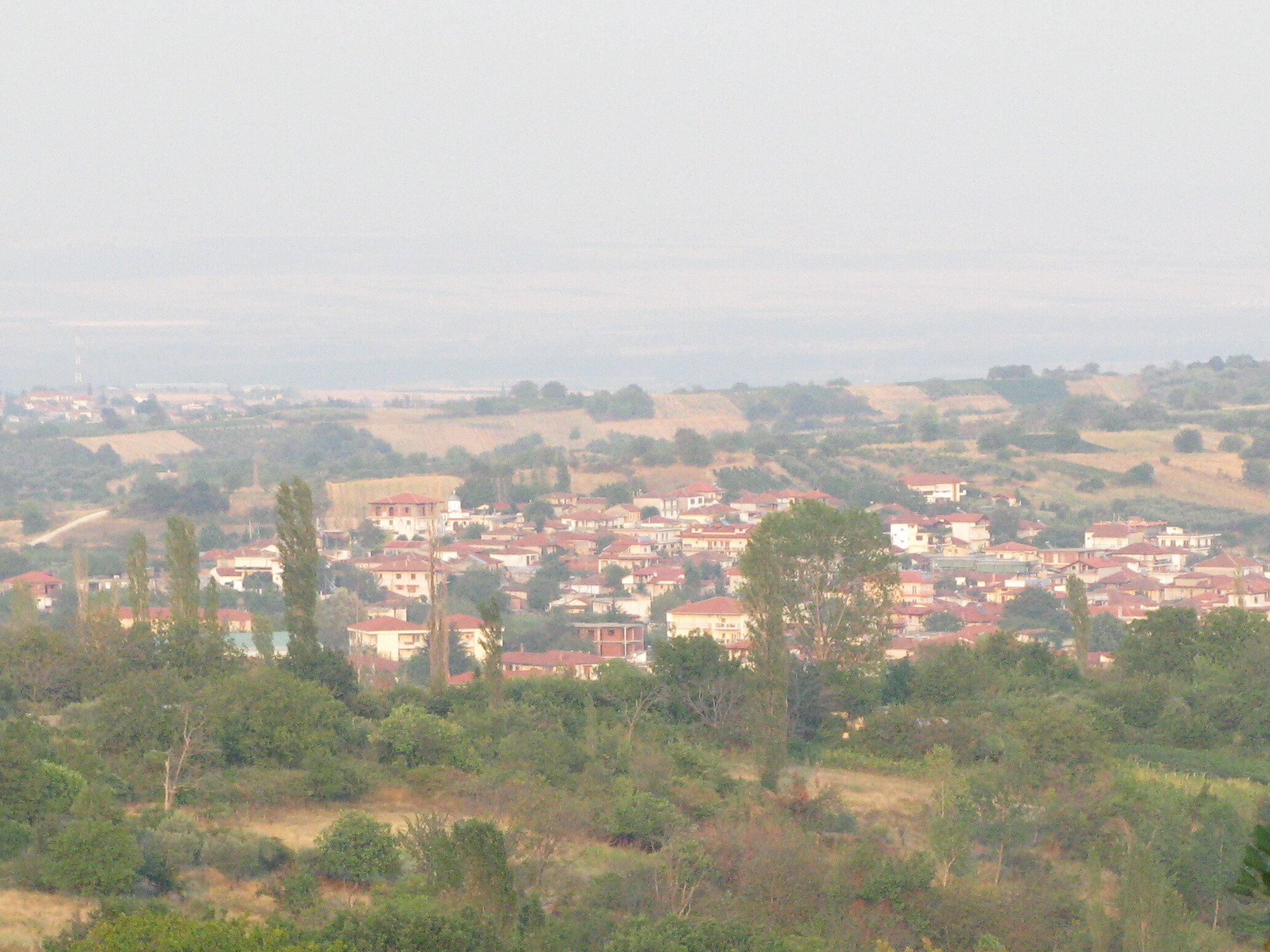

- Location within the regional unit

- Location within Greece
- Coordinates: 40°56′N 22°27′E
- Country: Greece
- Geographic region: Macedonia
- Regional unit: Kilkis
- Municipality: Paionia

Area
  - Municipal unit: 208.9 km^{2} (80.7 sq mi)
- Elevation: 268 m (879 ft)

Population (2021)
  - Municipal unit: 5,157
  - Municipal unit density: 24.69/km^{2} (63.94/sq mi)
  - Community: 3,292
- Time zone: UTC+2 (EET)
  - Summer (DST): UTC+3 (EEST)
- Postal code: 613 00
- Area code: 2343
- Vehicle registration: ΚΙ
- Website: www.goumenissa.eu

Goumenissa (Greek: Γουμένισσα [ɣuˈme̞nisa]) is a small traditional town in the Kilkis regional unit, Macedonia, Greece. Since the 2011 local government reform it is part of the Paionia Municipality, of which it is a community and a municipal unit. The municipal unit has an area of 208.949 km^{2}. The 2021 census recorded 3,292 residents in the community and 5,157 residents in the municipal unit. The town sits on the southeastern part of the Paiko mountain range. Located 69 km northwest of Thessaloniki, 539 km north of Athens and 20 km north of Pella, the ancient capital of the Greek kingdom of Macedonia. Goumenissa is the seat of the Greek Orthodox diocese of Goumenissa, Axioupoli and Polykastro.

Goumenissa has narrow streets lined with traditional houses and is renowned for a wide range of things; apart from its preindustrial monuments built beside lush springs, there are traditional wineries which prove the expertise of this small country town to produce good quality wine. It is known for its folklore museum, its impromptu brass bands (Τα Χάλκινα της Γουμένισσας Ta Chalkina tis Goumenissas) and its customs, events and fetes, all of them are reflective of the traditional lifestyle.

== Name ==
There are a lot of versions of the origin of the name Goumenissa. According to the local tradition, robbers hung the Abbot (Greek: Ηγούμενος egoumenos) of the abbey, and the city's name, which means place of Abbot derived from this. In Bulgarian, it was called Гуменидже Gumenidzhe.

== History ==
=== Hellenistic Era ===
The town is located in part of the ancient Paeonia, the exact boundaries of which, like the early history of its inhabitants, are very obscure. According to Herodotus (v. 16), they were Teucrian colonists from Troy. Homer (Iliad, book II, line 848) speaks of Paeonians from the Axios River fighting on the side of the Trojans, but the Iliad does not mention whether the Paeonians were kin to the Trojans. Homer gives the Paeonian leader as a certain Pyraechmes; later on in the Iliad a second leader is mentioned, Asteropaeus son of Pelagon.

=== Roman Era (146 BC - 330) ===
After the Roman conquest of Macedonia in 146 BC, Paeonia east and west of the Axios formed the second and third districts respectively of the Roman province of Macedonia (Livy xiv. 29). Centuries later under Diocletian, Paeonia and Pelagonia formed a province called Macedonia secunda or Macedonia Salutaris, belonging to the Praetorian prefecture of Illyricum.

=== Byzantine Era (330 - 1387) ===
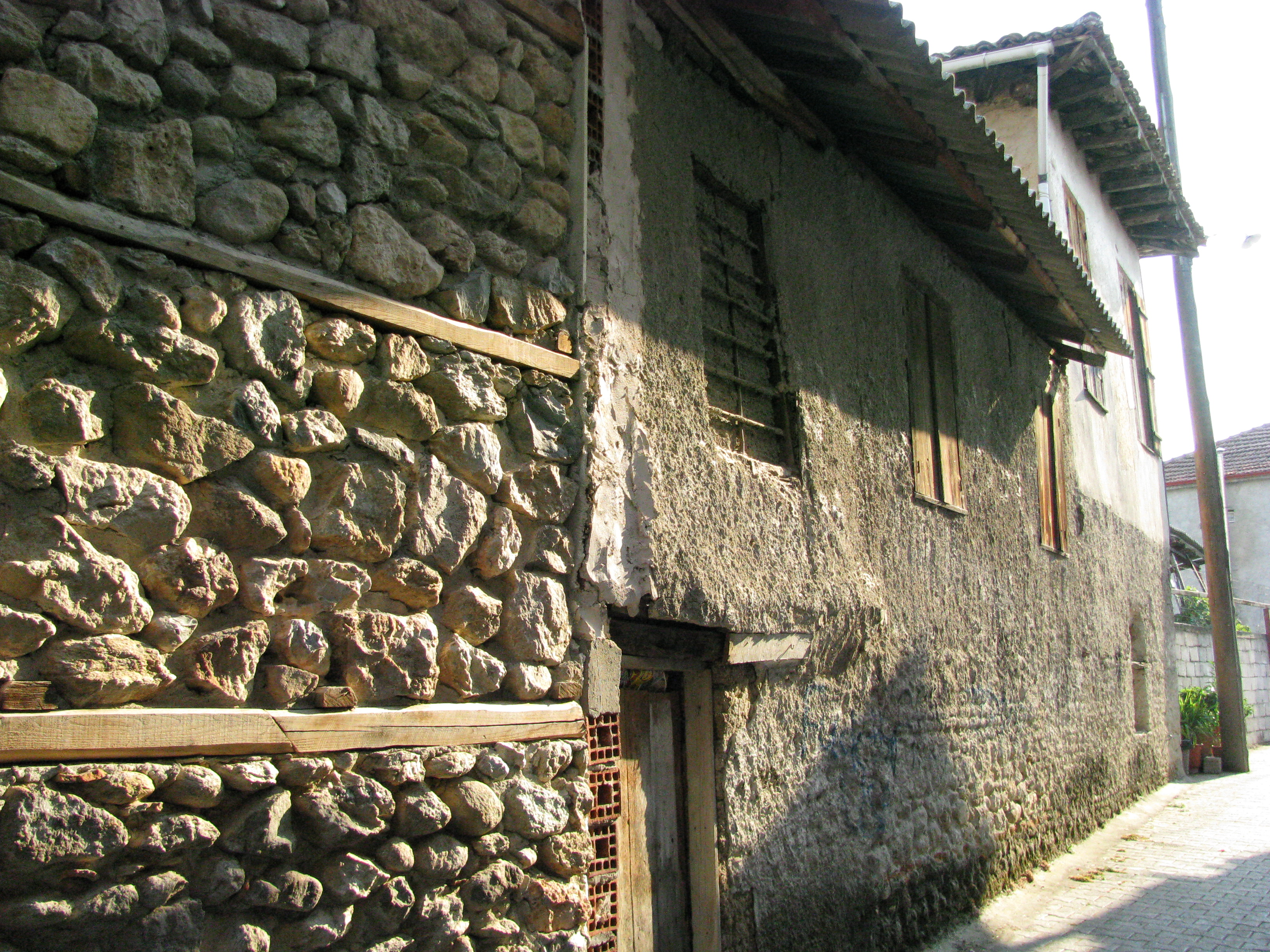
Street of Goumenissa.

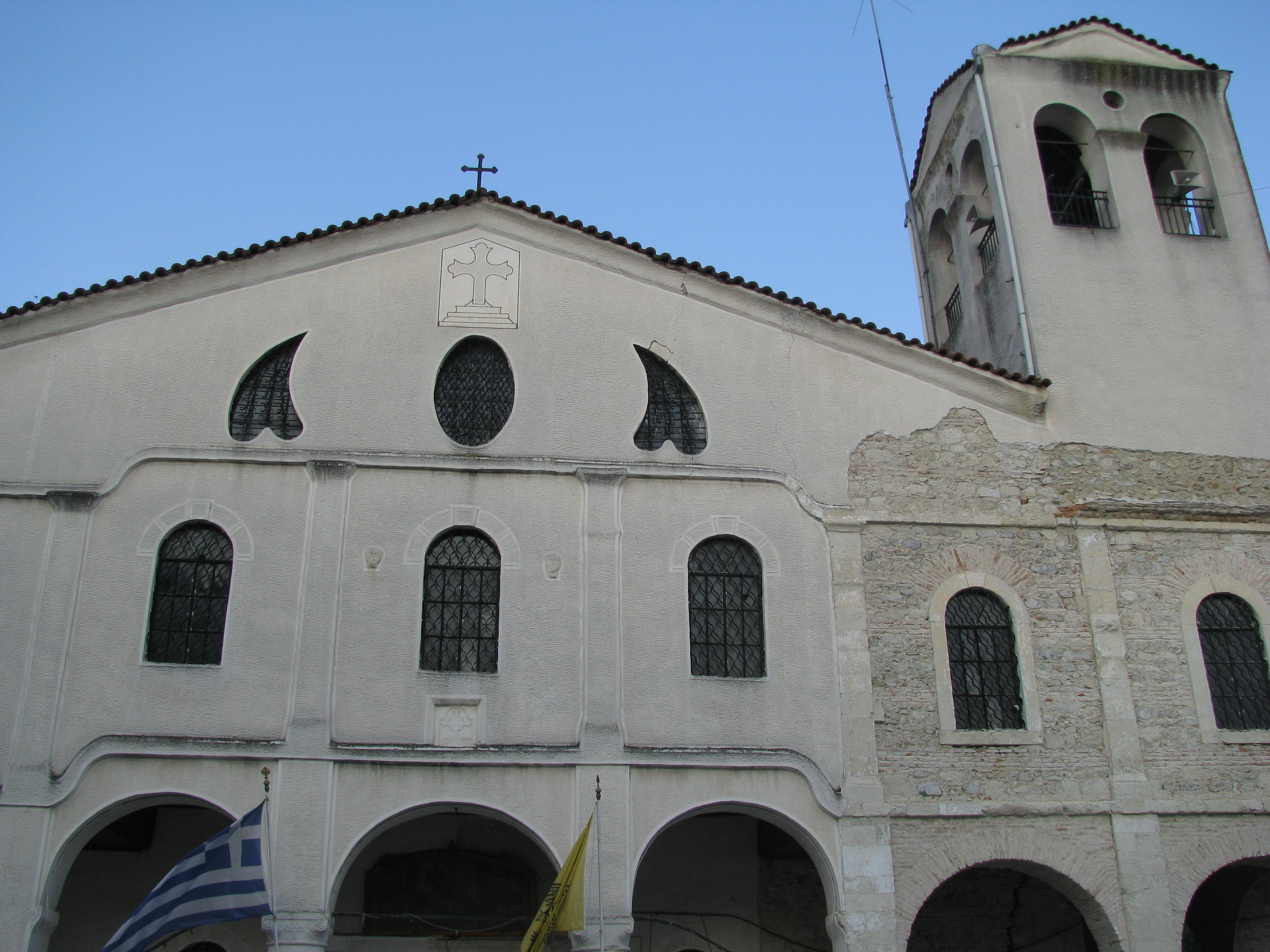
Church in Goumenissa.

When the Roman Empire was divided into eastern and western segments ruled from Constantinople and Rome respectively, Goumenissa came under the control of the Eastern Roman Empire (Byzantine Empire). Goumenissa passed out of Byzantine hands in 1204, when Constantinople was captured by the Fourth Crusade and became part of the Kingdom of Thessalonica - the largest fief of the Latin Empire, covering most of northern and central Greece.

In 1224 it was seized by Theodore Komnenos Doukas, the Greek ruler of Despotate of Epirus. The area was recovered by the Byzantine Empire in 1246. First report with the name Goumenissa we have at the year 1346, at the era of Palaiologos Dynasty. In an Imperial Act of this year, the region of Goumenissa is granted in the Holly Abbey Ibyron of Mount Athos and becomes religious centre because of the Monastery of Virgin Mary. Next to Monastery existed a settlement that little later with the union of small agro-pastoral settlements will create a dynamic town that will be named Goumenissa.

=== Ottoman Era (1387 - 1912) ===
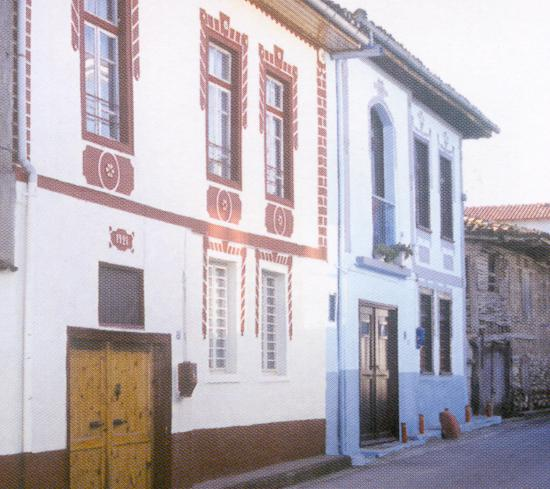
19th century houses.

The Ottomans captured Goumenissa in 1387. Under the rule of the Ottoman Empire the area was characterized self-governed town and acquired privileges because of the important production of buckram, used for the military uniforms of the Ottoman army. Goumenissa prospered during the 19th century and became economic, cultural and religious centre of the region. The famed wine of Goumenissa, made out of local varieties like Xinomavro and Negoska, become popular in the Ottoman Empire and beyond, particularly in Central Europe.

Even though being a town with privileges, it was not uninvolved in the Greek War of Independence of 1821. By the outbreak of the revolution, the Ottoman army conducted searches of premises and found 49 rifles. This led to violent islamization ordered by Pasha of Thessaloniki Abdul Abud. The punishment included the handing over of money, food, animals and carriages.

The Russian slavist Victor Grigorovich in 1845, however, recorded Igumencho as mostly Bulgarian village. The first Bulgarian school was founded in 1866–1867.

==== Macedonian Struggle ====
By 1899, the Bulgarian komitadjis of the Internal Macedonian-Adrianople Revolutionary Organisation (IMRO) turned against Ottoman authorities. Gradually, tensions increased among the followers of the Patriarchate of Constantinople (mostly Greeks) and those of the Bulgarian Exarchate (mostly Bulgarians) to the point of armed conflict.

The rioting in Macedonia, the atrocities of Bulgarian komitadjis troops against Greek locals and especially the death of Pavlos Melas (killed by Turks in 1904) caused intense nationalistic feelings in Greece. This led to the decision to send more Greek guerrilla troops in order to thwart Bulgarian efforts.

The village also had supporters of the Bulgarian cause. Notably, 21 persons joined the Macedonian-Adrianopolitan Volunteer Corps.

Conflicts ended after the revolution of Young Turks in July 1908, as they promised to respect all ethnicities and religions and generally to provide a constitution.

On October 23, 1912, during the course of the First Balkan War Goumenissa was conquered by the Hellenic Army and incorporated into the Kingdom of Greece.

===== Greek Macedonian fighters =====
- Goumenissa: Dimitrios Aliris, Ioannis Aliris, Christos Aliris, Ioannis Vouzas, Vassilios Karakolis, Athanassios Maltsis, Georgios Metaxas, Georgios Pazaretzos, Ioannis Papageorgiou, Nikolaos Papamanolis, Ioannis Pissoutas, Athanassios Pipsos, Georgios Poulkas, Aggelos Sakellariou, Eleni Samara, Georgios Samaras, Dimitrios Samaras, Konstantinos Samaras, Athanassios Slapakis, Dimitrios Slioupikidis, Athanassios Tzanas, Georgios Totsis, Christos Toumpas, Athanassios Tsimirikos, Nikolaos Chatzivrettas, Christos Chatzidimitrakis
- Kastaneri: Georgios Dogiamas, Lazaros Dogiamas, Traianos Dogiamas, Christos Dogiamas, Traianos Touloupis,
- Karpi: Athanassios Zaras, Athanassios Betsis, Traianos Partoulas, Georgios Softsis, Traianos Softsis,
- Griva: Ioannis Ekonomou, Christos Poulkas, Christos Pipsos

===== Bulgarian Macedonian fighters =====
- Goumenissa: Ichko Boychev (1882–1960), Ivan Limonchev, Ivan Alev (1851–1919), Konstantin Dzekov, Mihail Chakov, Hristo Batandzhiev, Hristo Shaldev, Vangel Gologanov, Gono Azarov, Domitar Shotev, Ivan Karadzov (1870–1913).

=== Modern Era (1912 - present) ===
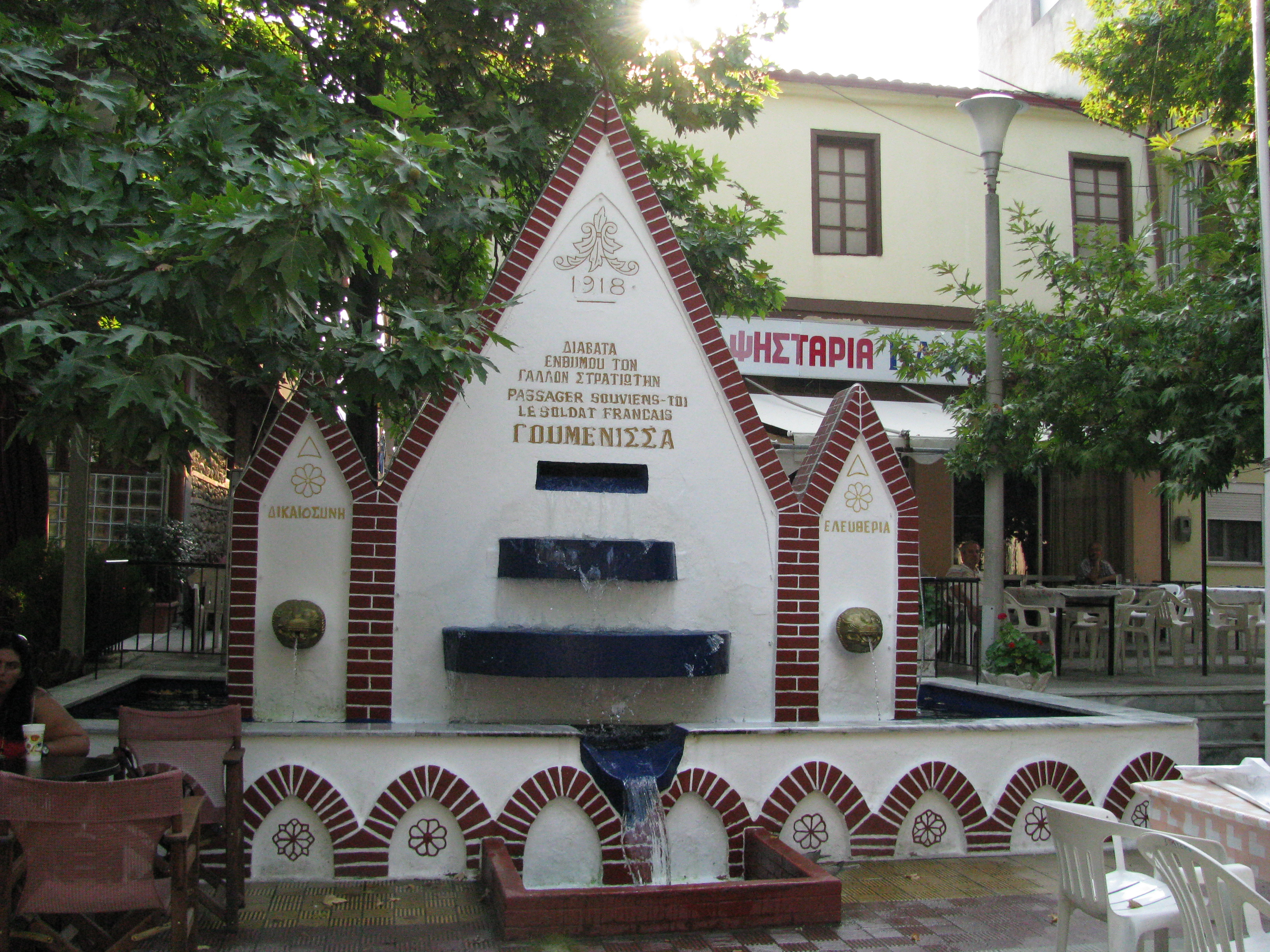
French fountain, memorial of WWI, at the center of Goumenissa.

During World War I, late 1915, Franco-British divisions under the command of French General Maurice Sarrail marched on Paionia. A French Division camped in Goumenissa and built a military hospital, a power station and the famous Fountain in Central Square.

After 1923 the Greek-Turkish and Greek-Bulgarian population exchange, Greek refugees from East Thrace, Asia Minor and Eastern Rumelia resettled in the region in exchange with the Muslim and Bulgarian populations. Macedonia experienced a demographic change with the arrival of the Asia Minor Greeks; by 1928, 427 families comprising 1,676 inhabitants arrived from Asia Minor. The Slavic-speaking minority in northern Greece, who were referred to by the Greek authorities as “Slavophone Greeks” or “Bulgarisants”, were subjected to a gradual assimilation by the Greek majority. Their numbers were reduced by a large-scale emigration to North America in the 1920s and the 1930s and to Eastern Europe and Yugoslavia following the Greek Civil War (1944–1949). During World War II Goumenissa and Central Macedonia were occupied (1941–44) by Germany. During the same time a detachment of the pro-Bulgarian collaborationist paramilitary organization Ohrana was formed.

In the 1950s there was a massive emigration to the United States, Australia, Canada, West Germany and other Greek cities, mainly to Thessaloniki and Athens. In the 1980s many civil war refugees were allowed to re-emigrate.

== Subdivisions ==
The municipal unit Goumenissa is subdivided into the following communities:

- Goumenissa (η Γουμένισσα) Town Hall
- Griva (η Γρίβα)
- Gerakon (η Γερακών)
- Karpi (η Κάρπη)
- Kastaneri (η Καστανερή)
- Omalos (ο Ομαλός)
- Pentalofon (το Πεντάλοφον)
- Stathis (ο Στάθης)
- Filyria (η Φιλυριά)

=== Mayors of Goumenissa ===
Mayor	From	To	Elected	Backed by
Christos Karakolis (Χρήστος Καρακόλης)	January 1, 1983	December 31, 1990	October 1982 60%, October 1986 52%	PASOK, KKE, KKE Interior
Dimitrios Pakos (Δημήτριος Πάκος)	January 1, 1991	December 31, 1994	October 1990 53,7%	New Democracy
Dimitrios Petsos (Δημήτριος Πέτσος)	January 1, 1995	December 31, 1998	October 1994 52,8%	PASOK
Vasilios Patsis (Βασίλειος Πάτσης)	January 1, 1999	December 31, 2002	October 1998 52,6%	New Democracy
Dimitrios Petsos (Δημήτριος Πέτσος)	January 1, 2003	December 31, 2006	October 2002 50,96%	PASOK
Stylianos Papapanagiotou (Στυλιανός Παπαπαναγιώτου)	January 1, 2007		October 2006 52,35%	New Democracy

== Landmarks ==
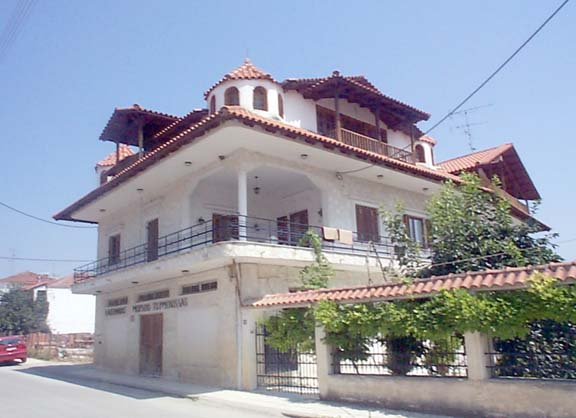
Folklore museum

- Central Square
- The French Fountain
- Square of St. George
- Small Square
- Macedonian Folklore Museum (Goumenissa)
- Silk Factory
- Boutari Winery, Aidarinis Winery, Domaine Tatsis, Distillery Dimitri Kambouri
- Two Rivers
- Traditional mountainous settlement of Kastaneri

=== Monasteries ===
- Monastery of the Virgin Mary at Goumenissa (Est. 1100)

Belongs to: Diocese of Goumenissa

- Monastery of St. Nikodimos at Pentalofon (Est. 1981)

Dependency of: the Monastery of Simonos Petra, Mount Athos

- Monastery of St. Raphael, Nicholas & Irene at Griva (Est. 1992)

Belongs to: Diocese of Goumenissa

- Monastery of St. George at Anydron (Est. 1991) (convent)

Belongs to: Diocese of Goumenissa

== Demographics ==
According to the Hellenic Statistical Authority, in 2001 Goumenissa was the town with the third largest population in Kilkis Prefecture, with an estimated population of 4,073.

District	2001	1991	+/- %
Goumenissa (Γουμένισσα)	4,073	4,163	-2,16
Griva (Γρίβα)	813	779	+4,18
Stathis (Στάθης)	418	465	-10,11
Karpi (Κάρπη)	400	391	+2,30
Gerakon (Γερακών)	286	350	-18,29
Filyria (Φιλυριά)	279	304	-8,22
Kastaneri (Καστανερή)	237	344	-31,10
Pentalofon (Πεντάλοφον)	191	231	-17,32
Omalon (Ομαλόν)	122	145	-15,86
TOTAL	6,819	7,172	-4,92

In Goumenissa live a population of 300 of Rom origin. They live in the south-eastern department of city, which in 1983, with an Act of Municipal Council, was named “Settlement of Saint George”.

== Economy ==
Goumenissa is a famous wine producing region with Appellation d’origine de Qualite Superieure, centre of a region that has been renowned for the quality of its wines for hundreds of years.

== Culture ==
Goumenissa as filming location:

- 1986: The Beekeeper (Greek: Ο Μελισσοκόμος)
  - Director:Theo Angelopoulos
  - Cast: Marcello Mastroianni, Nadia Mourouzi, Jenny Roussea, Dinos Iliopoulos
- 1981: The Factory (Greek: Το Εργοστάσιο)(French L'usine)
  - Director:Tasos Psaras
  - Cast: Vasilis Kolovos, Dimitra Hatoupi

Club	Greek subgroup	Founded	Activities	Venue
The Paiones (Οι Παίονες)	Greek Macedonians	1975	Choruses, traditional dancing groups	Goumenissa
Diogenis Sinopeus (Διογένης ο Συνοπεύς)	Pontic Greeks	1982	Traditional dancing groups	Goumenissa
Agios Trifon (Ο Άγιος Τρύφων)	Eastern Roumelian Greeks	1979	Traditional dancing groups	Goumenissa
Agios Georgios (Άγιος Γεώργιος)	Greek Macedonians	1983	Brass Bands	Goumenissa
Griva (Πολιτιστικός Σύλλογος Γρίβας)	Greek Macedonians	1983	Traditional dancing groups	Griva
Makedones (Οι Μακεδόνες)	Greek Macedonians	1990	Traditional dancing groups	Stathis
To Paiko (Το Πάικο)	Greek Macedonians			Kastaneri
Filyria (Η Φιλυριά)	Pontic Greeks		Traditional dancing groups	Filyria

== Sport clubs ==
Club	Sport	Founded	League	Venue
Paiko Goumenissas (Πάικο Γουμένισσας)	Football	1950	A' Erasitehniki: Hellenic Football Federation	Stadium of Goumenissa
Makedonikos Grivas (Μακεδονικός Γρίβας)	Football	1978	B' Erasitehniki: Hellenic Football Federation	Stadium of Griva
Heracles Karpis (Ηρακλής Κάρπης)	Football		B' Erasitehniki: Hellenic Football Federation	Stadium of Karpi
Astrapi Stathis (Αστραπή Στάθη)	Football		Γ' Erasitehniki: Hellenic Football Federation	Stadium of Stathis
Keravnos Filyrias (Κεραυνός Φιλυριάς)	Football		Γ' Erasitehniki: Hellenic Football Federation	Stadium of Filyria
A.O.K.(Αθλητικός Όμιλος Καλαθοσφαιριστών)	Basketball	1981	Γ : Hellenic Basketball Federation	Gym Stadium of Goumenissa
Α.Ο.Γ. (Αθλητικός Όμιλος Γουμένισσας)	Athletics	1981	Hellenic Amateur Athletic Association	Stadium of Goumenissa

== Climate ==
Month	Jan	Feb	Mar	Apr	May	Jun	Jul	Aug	Sep	Oct	Nov	Dec
Avg Maximum temp[°C]	9	10	13	18	23	28	31	30	26	21	14	10
Avg Minimum temp[°C]	1	2	5	7	12	16	18	18	15	11	6	2
Rainfall (mm)	40	38	43	35	43	30	22	20	27	45	58	50
Record temperatures [°C]	20	22	25	31	36	39	42	39	36	32	27	26

== Transportation ==
Goumenissa is accessed

- From Athens with GR-1/E75 to Polykastron Interchange
- From Thessaloniki with E86 to Gefyra Junction then E75 to Polykastron Interchange or E86 to Intetchange after 1 km from Nea Pella
- From Igoumenitsa and Alexandroupolis with GR-4/GR-2/E90 (Via Egnatia motorway) to Chalastra Interchange then E75 to Polykastron Interchange
- From the Republic of North Macedonia with E75 to Polykastron Interchange
- By bus from Athens and Thessaloniki Bus to Kilkis
- By railway from Thessaloniki and Central Europe to Polykastron Station 15 km from Goumenissa Greek Railways
- By air from Makedonia Airport (SKG) Thessaloniki. If you have a private plane Polykastron Airport 15 km from Goumenissa
