= Evropos =

Town in Central Macedonia, Greece

Evropos Ευρωπός
- Municipal unit
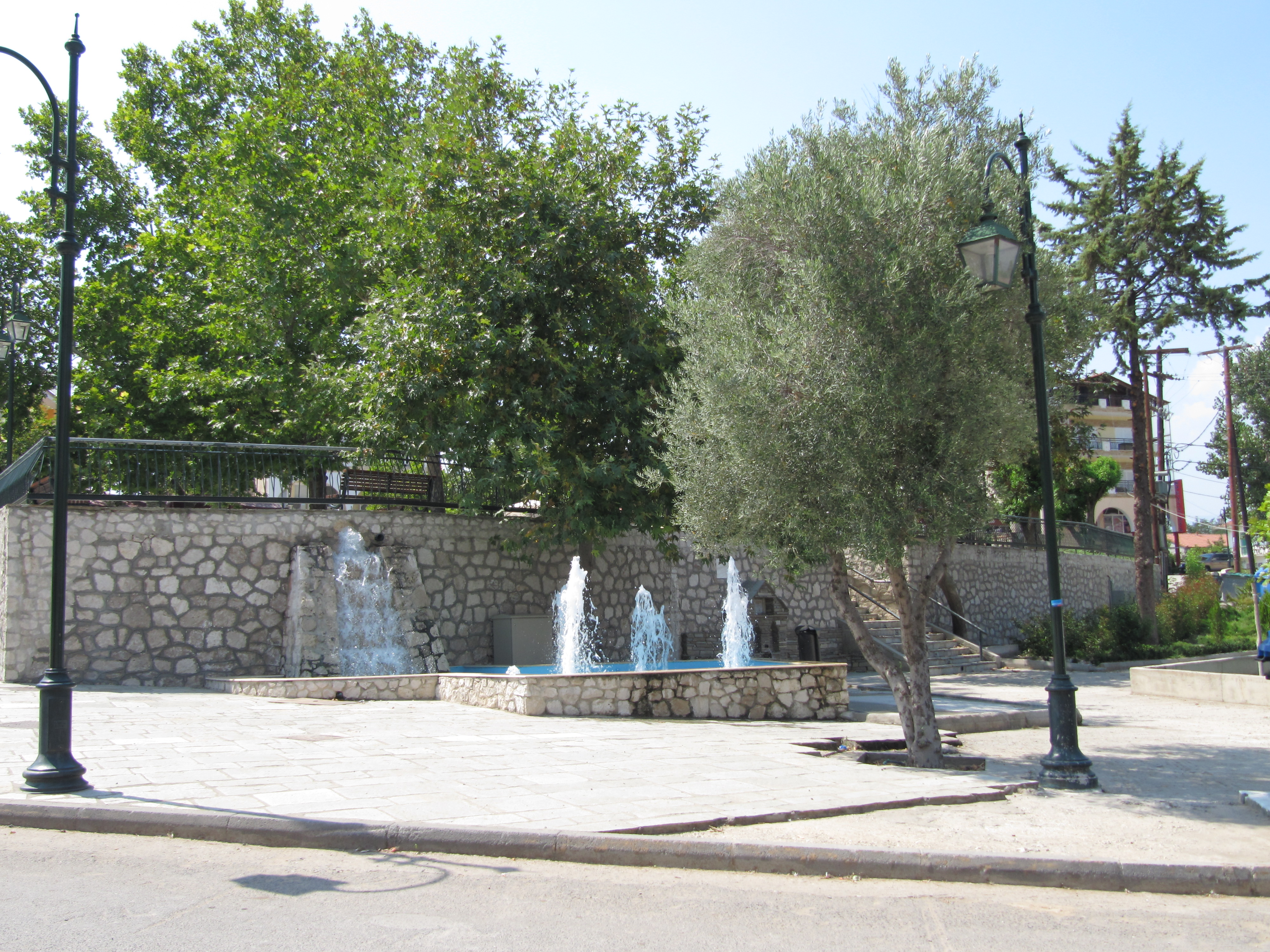
- Fountain in the central square of Evropos

- Location within the regional unit

- Location within Greece
- Coordinates: 40°54′N 22°33′E
- Country: Greece
- Administrative region: Central Macedonia
- Regional unit: Kilkis
- Municipality: Paionia

Area
  - Municipal unit: 80.9 km^{2} (31.2 sq mi)

Population (2021)
  - Municipal unit: 3,757
  - Municipal unit density: 46.4/km^{2} (120/sq mi)
  - Community: 1,413
- Time zone: UTC+2 (EET)
  - Summer (DST): UTC+3 (EEST)
- Vehicle registration: ΚΙ

Evropos (Greek: Ευρωπός, before 1925: Ασικλάρ Ašiklar) is a village in the Kilkis regional unit of Central Macedonia, Greece, located in the municipality of Paionia, of which it is a municipal unit. The modern village is built adjacent to the ancient town of Europos, which is most known for being the birthplace of Seleucus I Nicator, the founder of the Seleucid Empire. The municipal unit also encompasses several smaller nearby villages, adding up to a population of 3,757, of whom 1,143 live in the village of Evropos.

== History ==
=== Ancient town ===
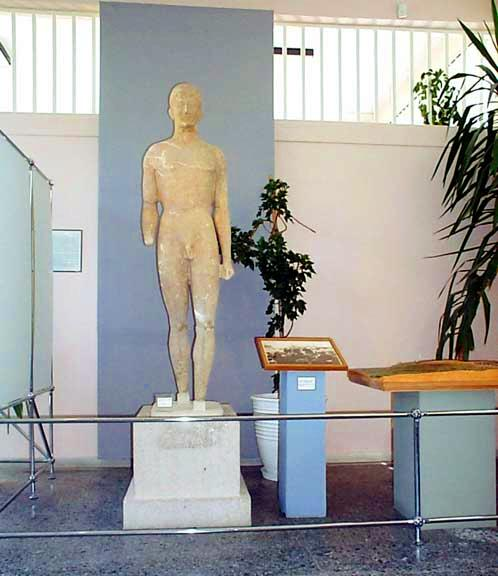
The Kouros found in Europos on display at the Archaeological Museum of Kilkis in 2012.

The modern village of Evropos is located approximately 1 kilometre (0.62 mi) frοm the ancient town of Europos. Europos is most known for being the birthplace of Seleucus I Nicator, a general of the Kingdom of Macedon during the Wars of Philip II and the Wars of Alexander the Great, later founding the Seleucid Empire during the Wars of the Diadochi. Archaeological excavations were initiated in the area in 1989 and uncovered a large part of the ancient town's necropolis. However, the most notable artifact was discovered years earlier in 1966, in a field by accident during tillage. It is a Kouros sculpture dating back to the 6th century BCE and standing at a height of 1.80 metres (5.9 ft). It is the only Kouros to have been discovered in Northern Greece, though studies of the composition of the marble that was used for the sculpture suggest that it may have been constructed somewhere in the Cyclades. It is now on display at the Archaeological Museum of Kilkis.

=== Modern history ===
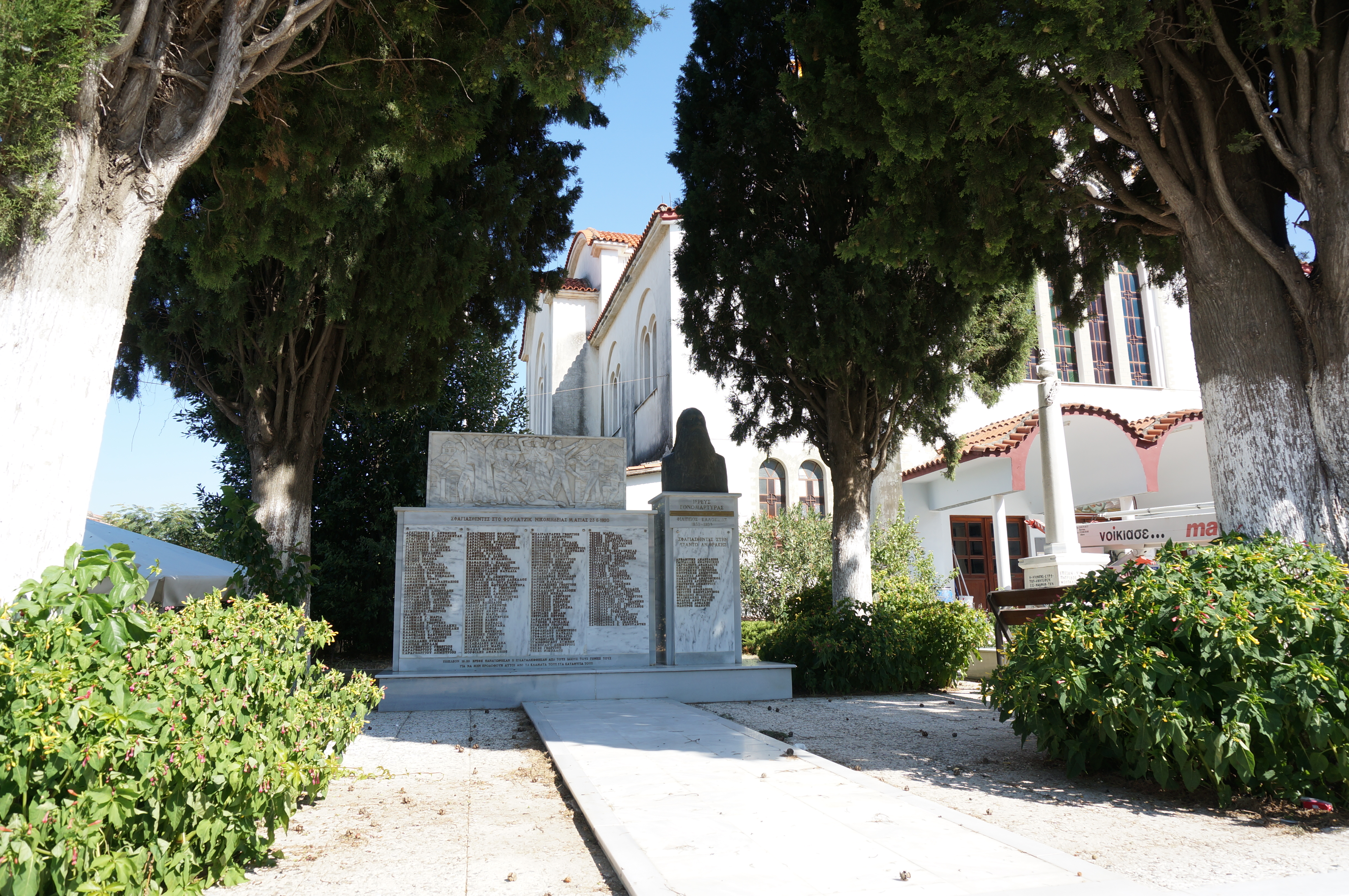
Memorial in Evropos for the Greek genocide victims of Fulacık and Tsanto.

Evropos was known as Ašiklar before 1925 and it was located within the territory of the Ottoman Empire until 1913, when it was ceded to Greece in the Treaty of Bucharest that ended the Balkan Wars. Its inhabitants were Turkish up until 1923, when they were transferred to Turkey during the population exchange between Greece and Turkey following the Greco-Turkish War of 1919–1922. Greeks settled in their place, the majority of whom came from Bithynia, with 277 families coming from the village of Fulacık and 9 from the village of Kızderbent, while 83 families came from the village of Tsanto (now Çantaköy) in East Thrace and 7 families came from Pontus. In addition, 11 families from the nearby Aromanian village of Megala Livadia also moved there, as well as 2 families of Caucasus Greeks from Armenia. Most of the settlers from Fulacık, who formed the majority of Evropos' population, despite being ethnically Greek, spoke Turkish as their native language.

== Administration ==
Evropos is a municipal unit of the municipality of Paionia, located in northern Greece in the Kilkis regional unit of the Central Macedonia region. Prior to the 2011 local government reform it used to be its own municipality. The municipal unit covers an area of 80.922 km^{2} and is subdivided into five communities:

- Evropos
- Agios Petros
- Mesia
- Polypetro
- Toumpa

== Gallery ==
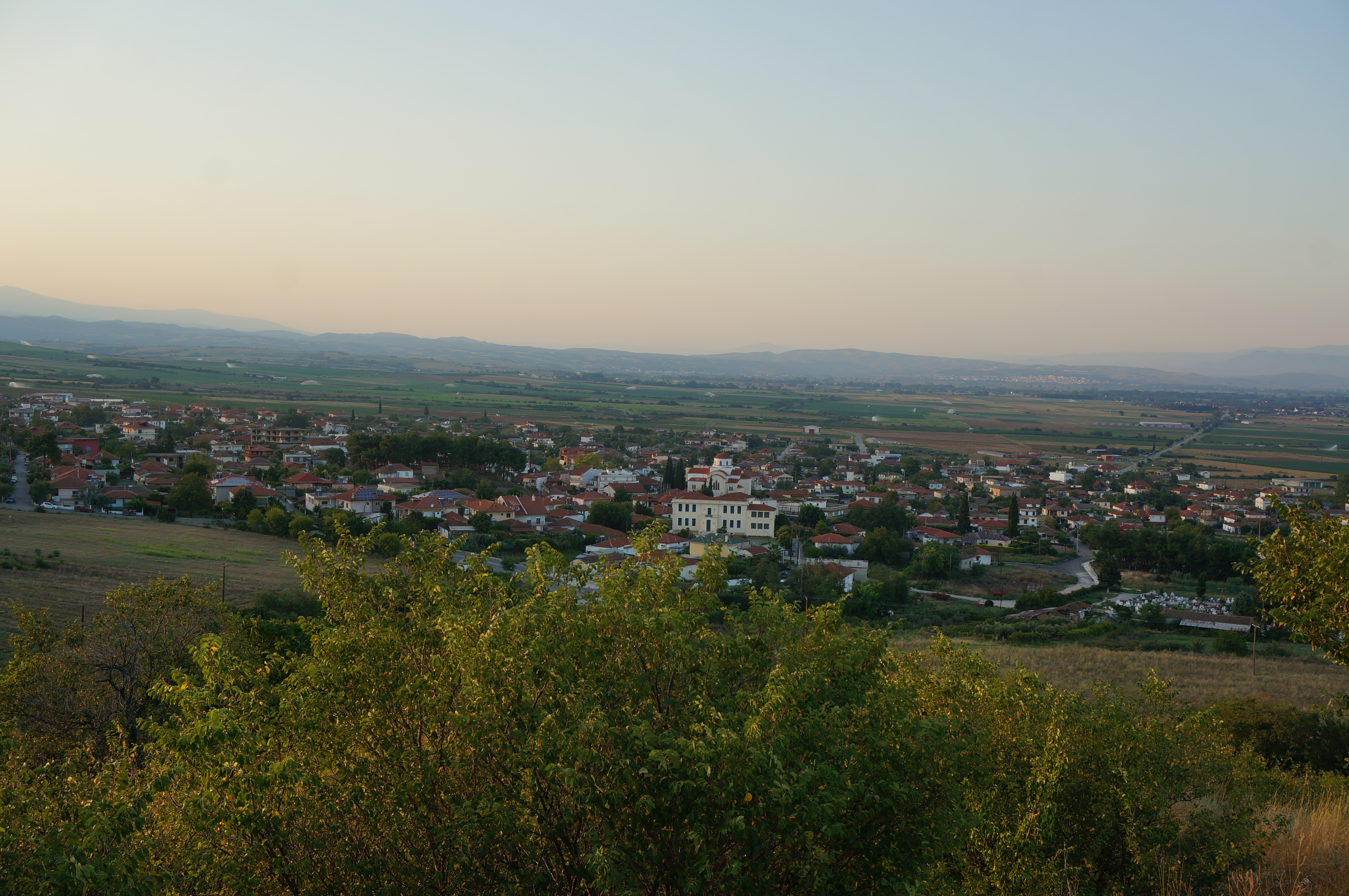
Panoramic view of Evropos

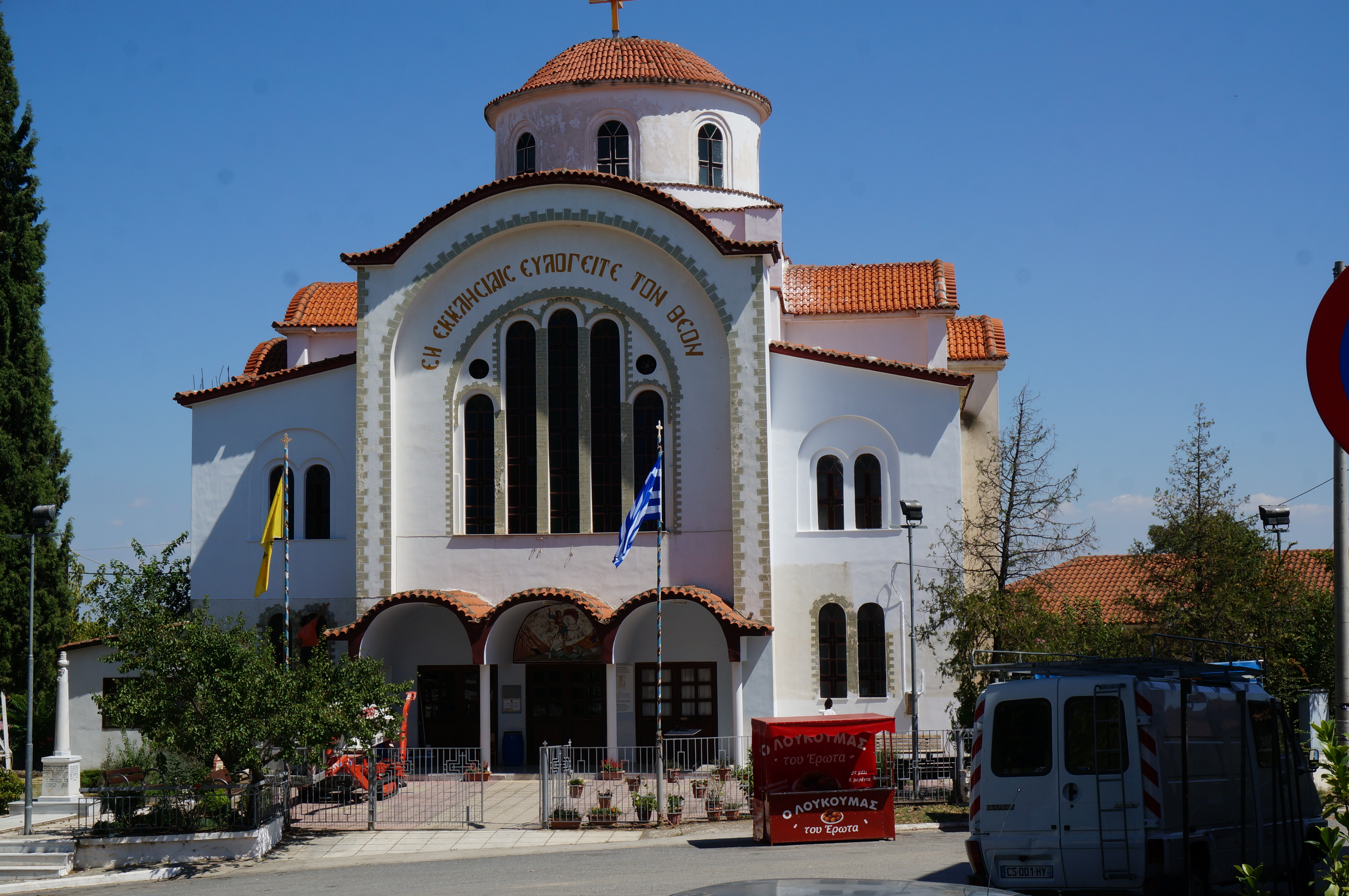
Church of Saint George in Evropos

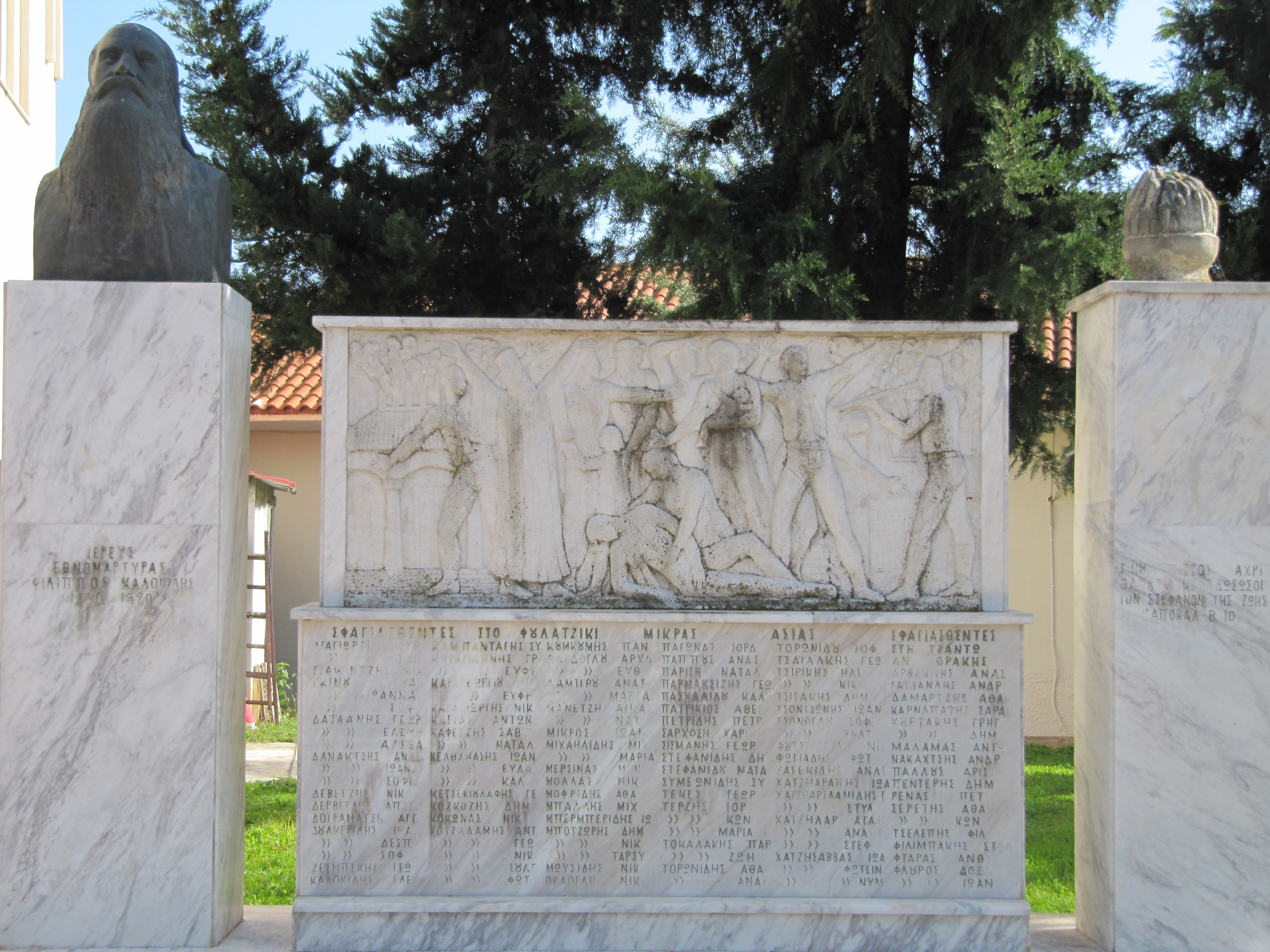
Close up view of the Greek genocide memorial

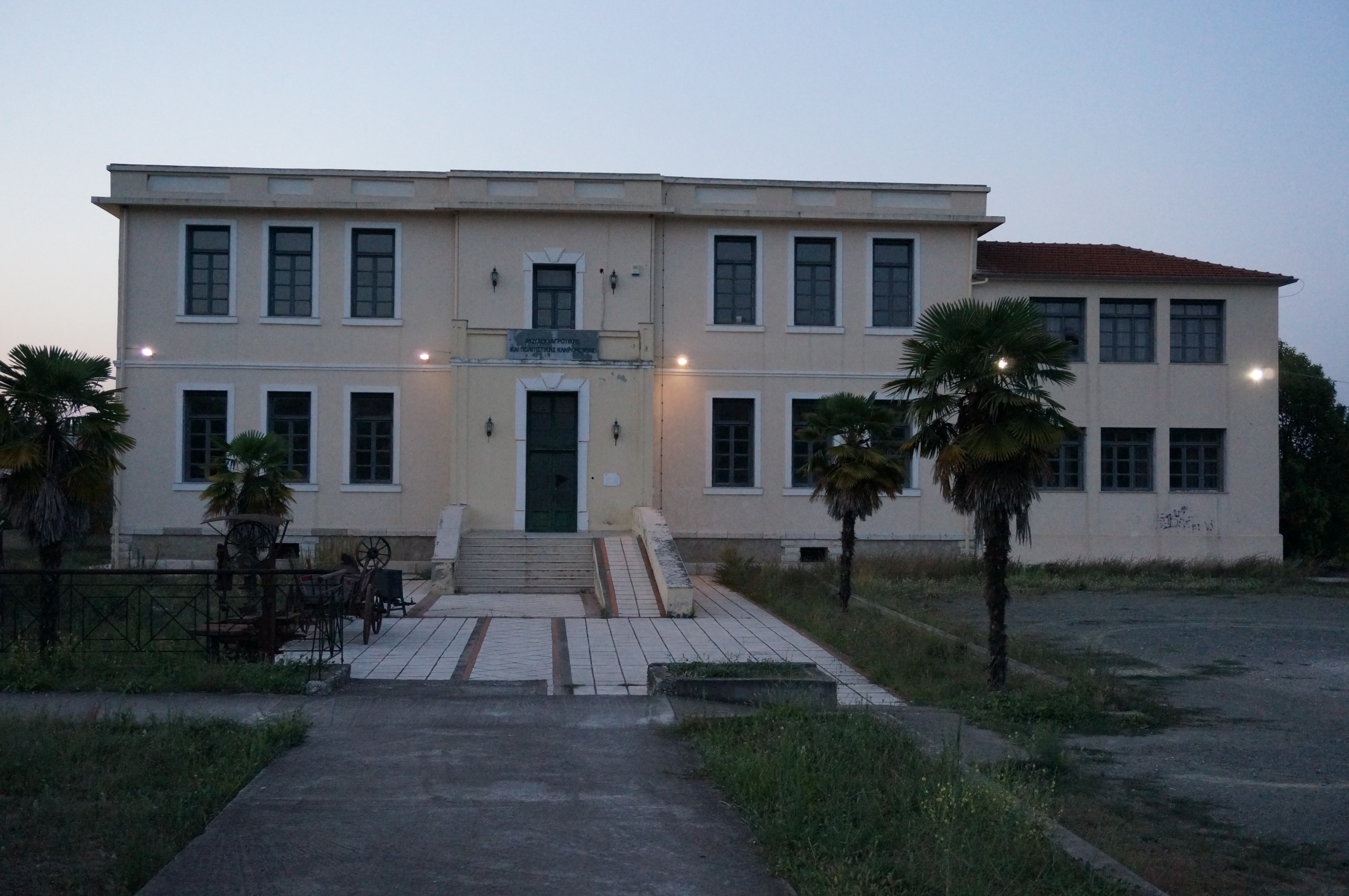
Museum of Argricultural and Cultural Heritage of Evropos

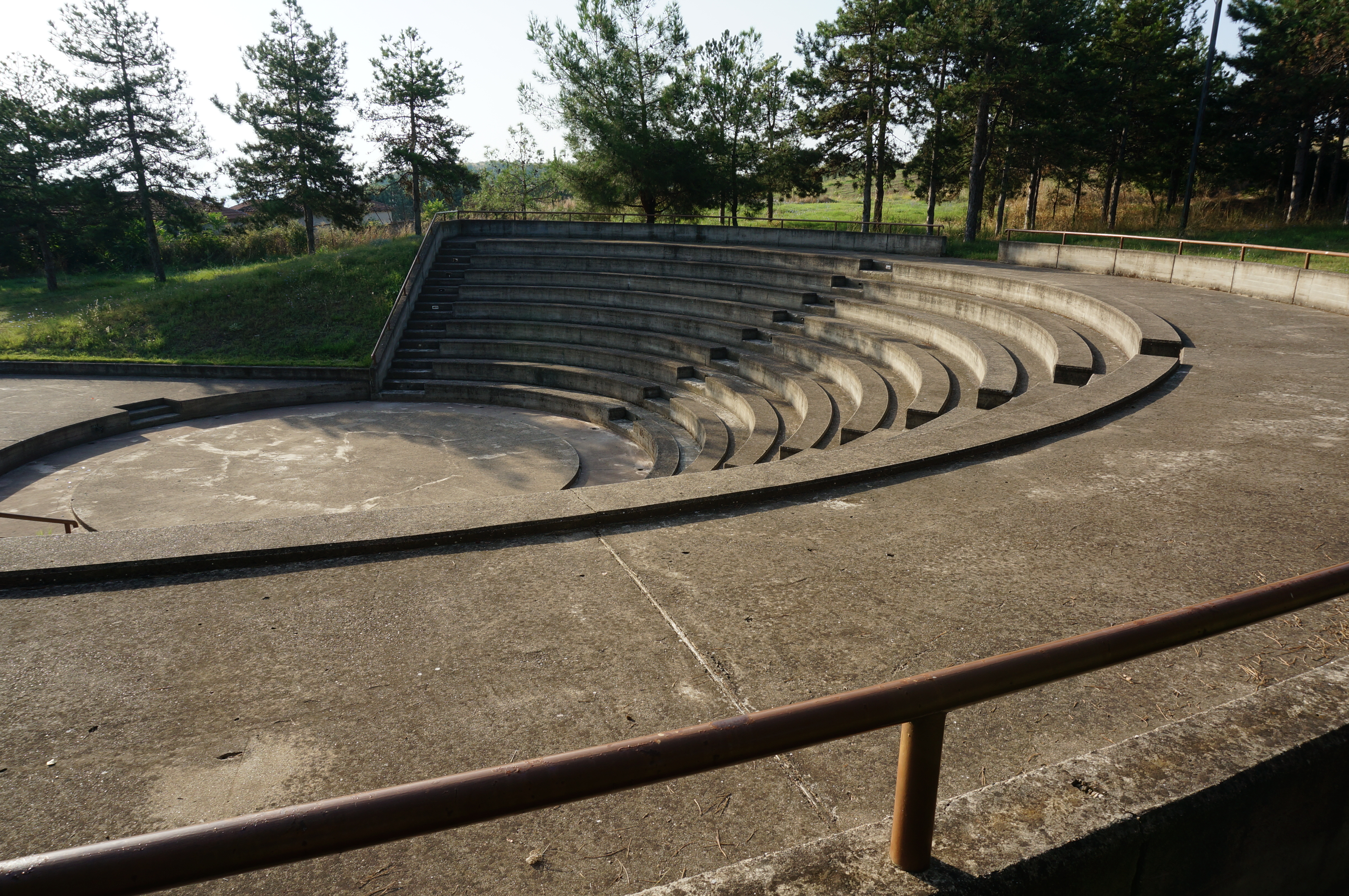
Theatre of Evropos
