= Paionia (municipality) =

Paionia Παιονία
- Municipality
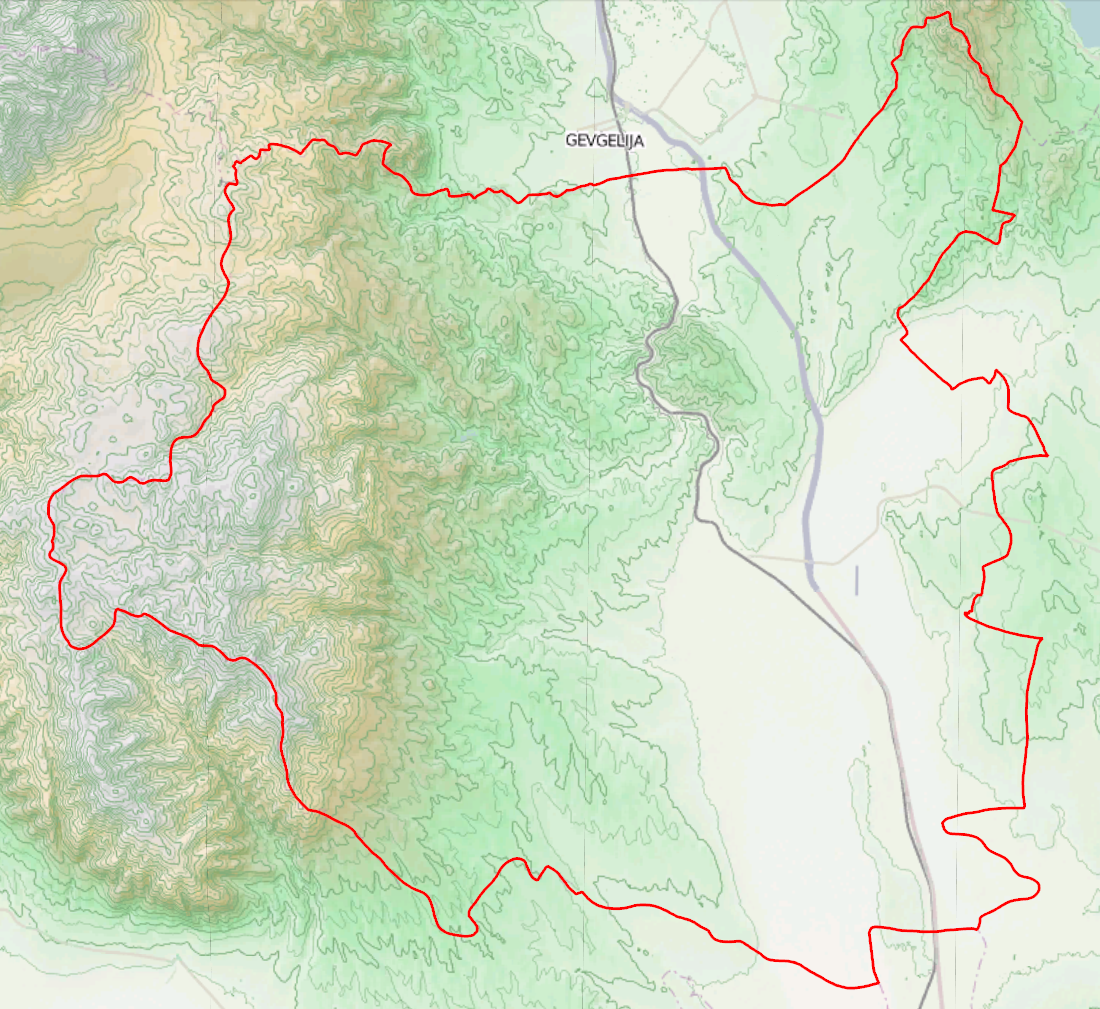

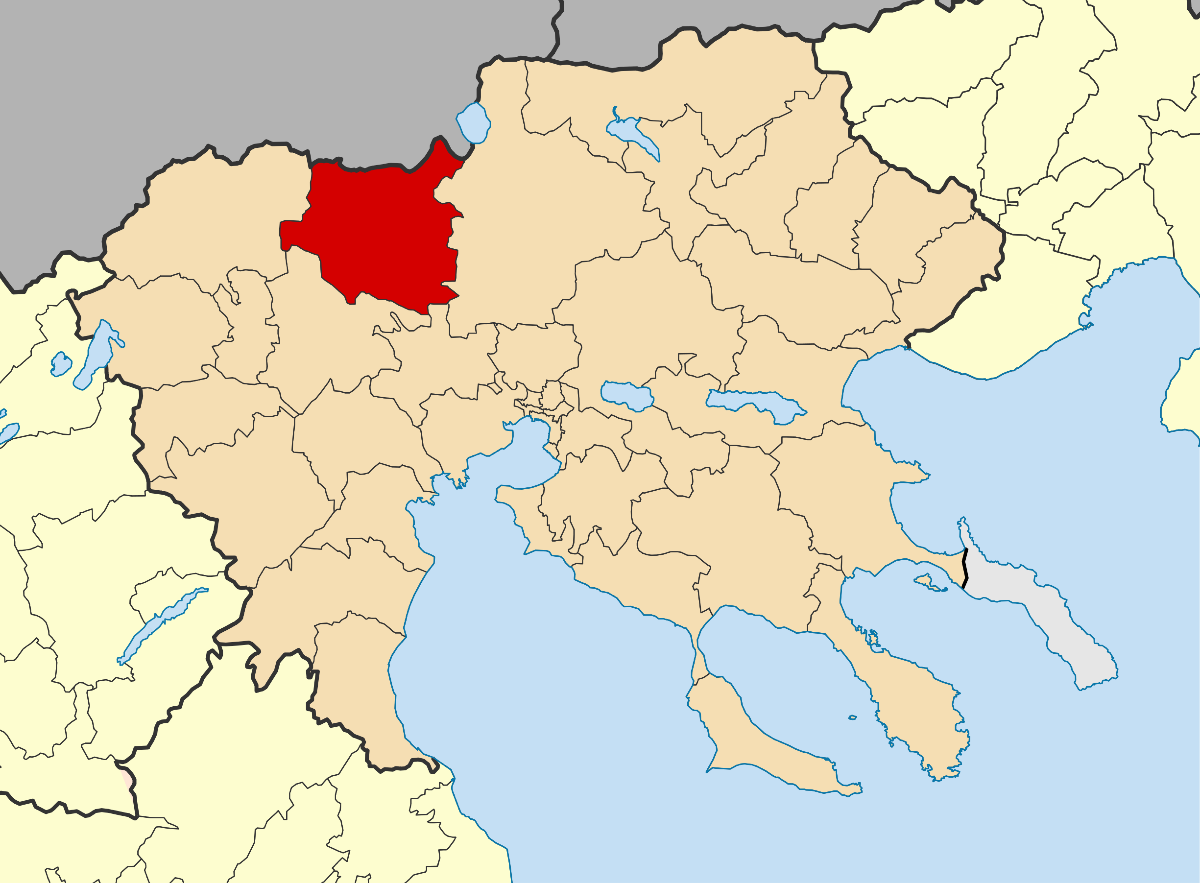

- Location within Greece
- Coordinates: 41°00′N 22°34′E
- Country: Greece
- Geographic region: Macedonia
- Administrative region: Central Macedonia
- Regional unit: Kilkis
- Seat: Polykastro

Area
  - Municipality: 919.3 km^{2} (354.9 sq mi)

Population (2021)
  - Municipality: 25,169
  - Density: 27.38/km^{2} (70.91/sq mi)
- Time zone: UTC+2 (EET)
  - Summer (DST): UTC+3 (EEST)

Paionia (Greek: Παιονία, pronounced [peoˈnia]) is a municipality in the Kilkis regional unit of Central Macedonia, Greece. The seat of the municipality is the town Polykastro. The municipality is named after the ancient region of Paeonia. It has an area of 919.276 km^{2}.

== Municipality ==
The municipality Paionia was formed at the 2011 local government reform by the merger of the following 5 former municipalities, that became municipal units:

- Axioupoli
- Evropos
- Goumenissa
- Livadia
- Polykastro

=== Province ===
The province of Paionia (Greek: Επαρχία Παιονίας) was one of the provinces of the Kilkis Prefecture. Its territory corresponded with that of the current municipality Paionia, except the municipal unit Polykastro. It was abolished in 2006.
