= Livadia, Kilkis =

Municipal unit in Central Macedonia, Greece

Livadia Λιβάδια
- Municipal unit
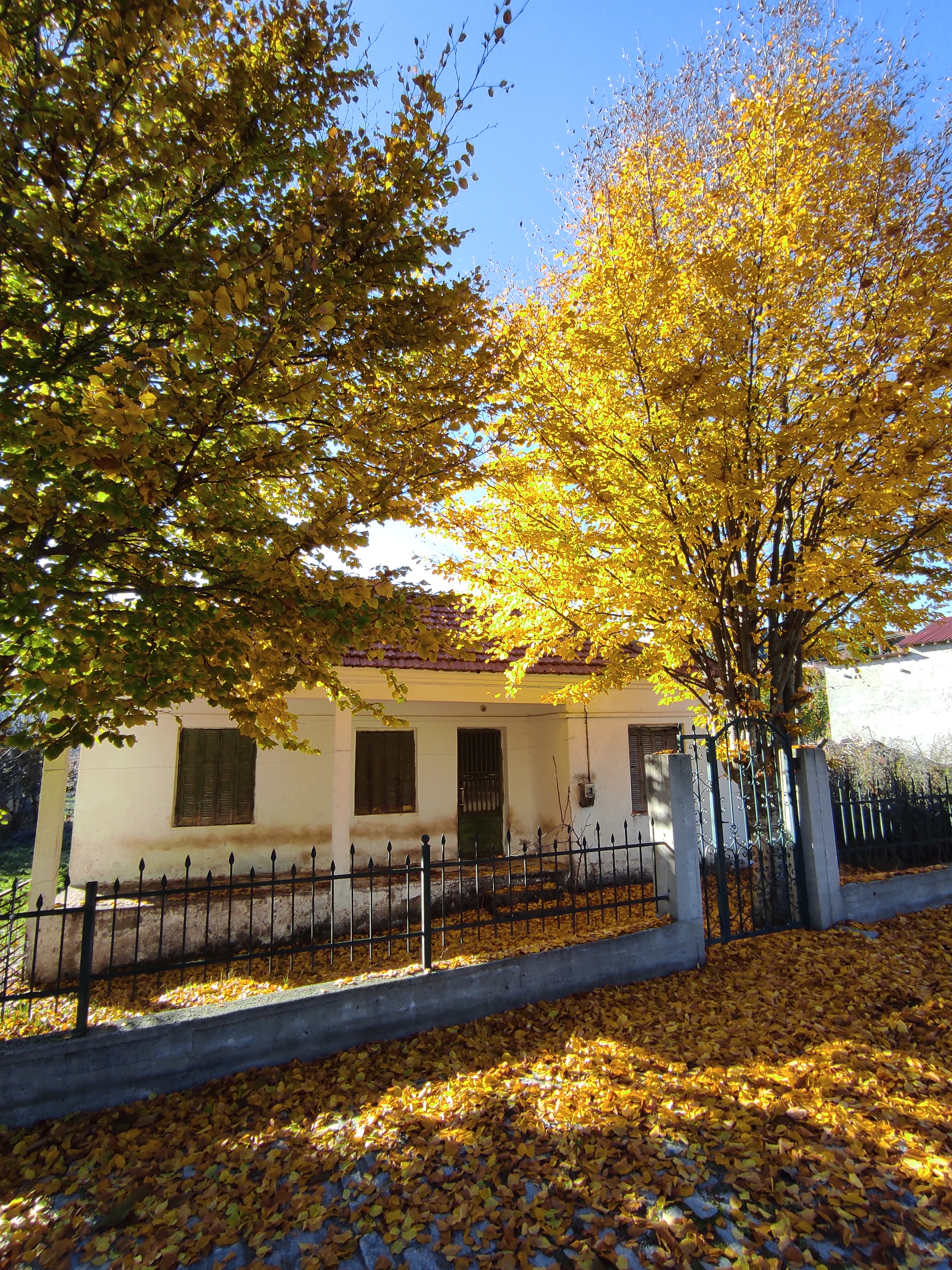
- Livadia

- Location within Greece
- Coordinates: 41°00′N 22°18′E
- Country: Greece
- Administrative region: Central Macedonia
- Regional unit: Kilkis
- Municipality: Paionia

Area
  - Municipal unit: 32.3 km^{2} (12.5 sq mi)

Population (2021)
  - Municipal unit: 123
  - Municipal unit density: 3.81/km^{2} (9.86/sq mi)
- Time zone: UTC+2 (EET)
  - Summer (DST): UTC+3 (EEST)
- Vehicle registration: ΚΙ

Livadia (Greek: Λιβάδια, Aromanian: Giumala de Jos or Livãdz; Megleno Romanian: Livezi) is a municipal unit of the municipality of Paionia, in the Kilkis regional unit of Central Macedonia, Greece. It historically consisted of two villages: Megala Livadia and Mikra Livadia, with the latter now being uninhabited. It covers an area of 32.282 km^{2} and has a population of 123, which is primarily composed of Aromanians. Prior to the 2011 local government reform, it used to be a community.

This historic community took part in various Greek revolutions, in particular the Macedonian Struggle in which many of inhabitants of Livadia participated, including:

- Anastassios Bilis Koulinas
- Nikolaos Nessios
- Konstantinos Balas
- Michael Balas
- Michael Batsios
- Dimitrios Bellis
- Nikolaos Davelis
- Michael Papanikolaou
- Nikolaos Saramanis
- Georgios Takiris
- Athanassios Tikas
- Aristides Tikas
- Georgios Chatzivrettas
- Michael Bellis
- Georgios Bellis (Belles)
- Stergios Naoum (Kapetan Naoum)

Some other inhabitants of the town fought against Greek bands in the Ottoman Empire during the early 20th century, an example being Mihail Handuri, an Aromanian armatole.

Another notable figure with origins from Livadia is the Aromanian linguist and philologist Nicolae Saramandu.
