= Proedria =

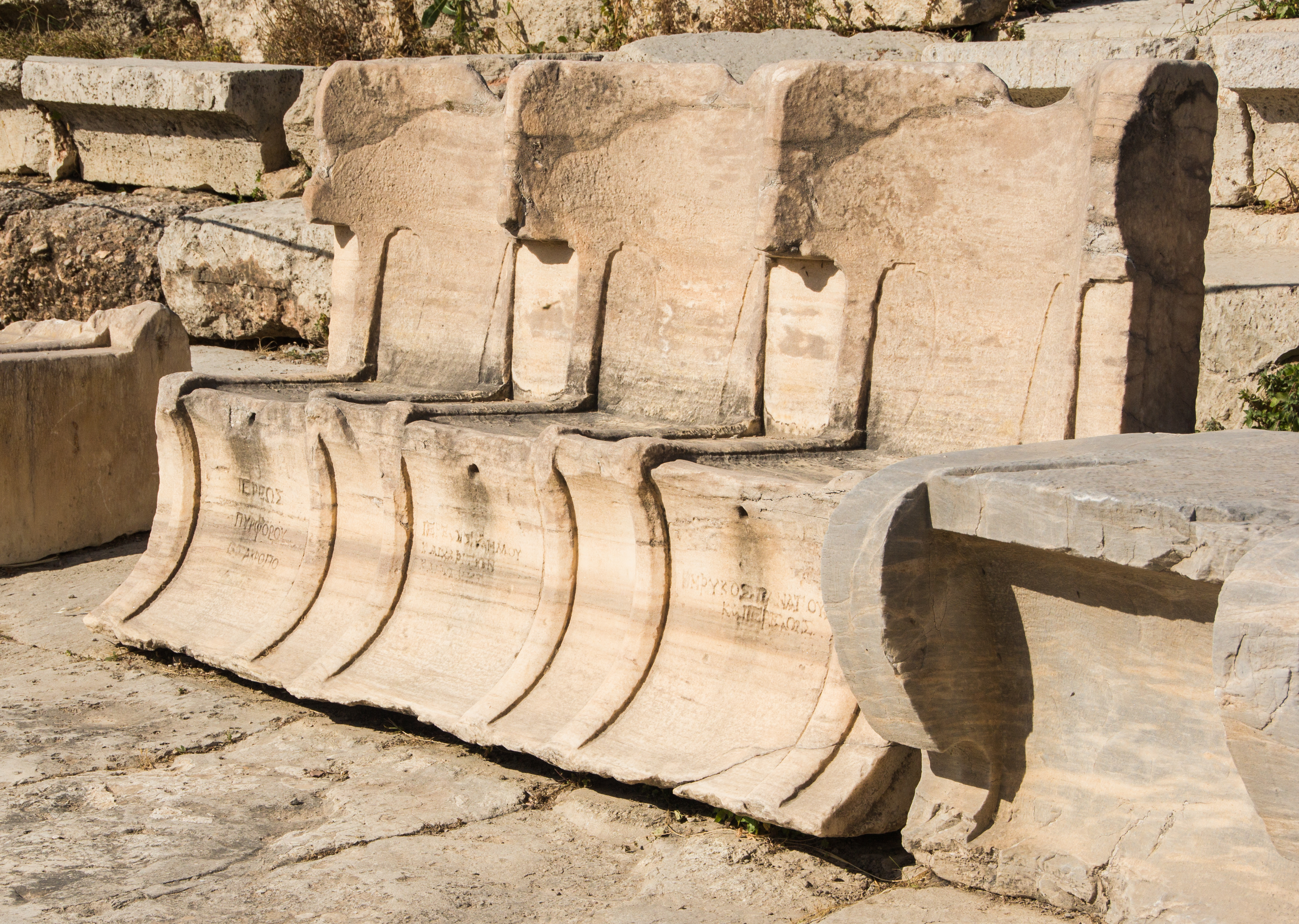
Proedria at the Theatre of Dionysus, on the slopes of the Acropolis, Athens, Greece.

Proedria (Ancient Greek: προεδρία, from προ, pro, "before" + ἕδρα, hedra, "seat") in ancient Greece and ancient Rome is, in its etymological sense, the front seat.

The term was also used to designate the protocathedria in a temple or a synagogue.

== Architecture ==
In the architecture of ancient theaters and odeons, the front row is a part of the koilon. It is the most honorable section, even more honorable than the seating reserved for the 500 members of the Boule (the bouleutikon).

The front row was distinguished from the other rows by its comfort. It was located on the flat wing of the theaters. It was made of wood, stone (a nobler material), or marble (an even nobler material). It sometimes featured a beautiful backrest and a footstool in the front. It was wider than the other rows. In the 4th century BC, monolithic marble thrones decorated with sculptures appeared in the front row, which showed the respect the city had for a benefactor in an even more ostentatious way.

Finally, the seats in the front row were the only ones to receive an inscription of the function or even the identity of the person who was to sit there.

Other divisions of the seating area appeared during the Roman period: tribunes in the central part of the lower tiers (cavea), balustrades isolating distinguished spectators (balteus), and removable seats in the orchestra (bisellium). The Roman proedria was set apart from the rest of the seats. For example, at the Augustan period Roman theatre of Itálica, the proedria consisted of three wide marble steps separated from the cavea by a marble balteus, with the front step decorated with a high-quality white marble kyma reversa molding. Anchoring holes in these steps were probably used to secure large marble or bronze elements, like altars.

== Institution ==
Practice of proedria consisted of reserving the front row, or even several front rows, for important figures during various events like games, competitions, and stage performances. These men, the proedroi (Ancient Greek: πρόεδρος, proedros), were chosen by the city primarily for their religious importance. This included priests and, above all, the priest of Dionysus, or the hierophant of Eleusis. They were also chosen for their political importance (archons, Harmodius and Aristogeiton and their families, Nero), military importance (strategoi, Cleon after the Battle of Sphacteria, Conon after the Battle of Cnidus), economic importance (benefactors of the city), or public prominence (winners of the Panhellenic Games, famous actors like Polus of Aegina who obtained proedria in Samos).

From the 4th century BC, the precedence of proedria was granted to foreigners (xenos), who were thus associated with the public life of the city. This included proxenoi, ambassadors, and citizens of a friendly country. From the 3rd century BC, even some ephebes sat in the front row.

All magistrates sat in the front seats during their term of office, and the privilege was withdrawn when they left their position. However, some kept this honor for life and even transmitted it hereditarily to their eldest son through an honorary decree.

The practice of proedria was widespread in ancient Greece. Sitting in the proedria was a great privilege (megiste time) and a highly prestigious mark of honor. The city could thus make known to everyone the consideration enjoyed by individuals of worth.

Proedria was the subject of a public proclamation by a herald even before the start of the theatrical competitions. The members were then named in a specific protocolary order. The members of the proedria did not pay for their seats and settled in ritually, led by the architect in charge of the sanctuaries (architecton epi ta hiera), who acted as both an urban planner and a chief of protocol.

It could be accompanied by other major honors, such as a meal served at the prytaneion or sitesis (5th century BC), or the erection of a statue (4th century BC). The people gathered in the koilon did not form a totally egalitarian group.

The exclusivity of the proedria apparently faded over time. Excavations at the Roman theatre of Itálica had shown the formerly marble steps were defaced by the late 3rd and early 4th centuries AD with informally carved gaming boards (tabulae lusoriae) and graffiti, including depictions of circus horses and their charioteers. The once-restricted area had likely become a space for casual public entertainment and gambling.

== Sources ==
- Aristophanes (1998). Acharnians. Knights. Translated by Henderson, Jeffrey. Harvard University Press. ISBN 978-0-674-99567-3.
- Aristophanes (2002). Frogs. Assemblywomen. Wealth. Translated by Henderson, Jeffrey. Harvard University Press. ISBN 978-0-674-99596-3.
- Cogan, Gwenola (2009). "Les récompenses en Grèce ancienne. Pratiques politiques et sociales de la reconnaissance dans les cités" [Rewards in ancient Greece. Political and social practices of recognition in the cities]. Hypothèses 2008. Publications de la Sorbonne.
- Demont, Paul; Lebeau, Anne (1996). Introduction au théâtre grec antique [Introduction to ancient Greek theater]. Livre de poche.
- Le Guen, Brigitte (1998). "Réflexions sur l'activité théâtrale dans le monde hellénique : à propos de trois synthèses récentes" [Reflections on theatrical activity in the Hellenic world: concerning three recent syntheses]. Topoi. 8 (1).
- Le Guen-Pollet, Brigitte (1995). "Théâtre et cités à l'époque hellénistique" [Theater and cities in the Hellenistic period]. Revue des études grecques. 108 (1).
- Moretti, Jean-Charles (2001). Théâtre et société dans la Grèce antique [Theater and society in ancient Greece]. Livre de poche.
- Pollux. Onomasticon. Vol. IV.
- Reinach, Salomon (1886). "Séance du 19 mars 1886. Note sur une synagogue grecque à Phocée" [Meeting of 19 March 1886. Note on a Greek synagogue in Phocaea]. Comptes rendus des séances de l'Académie des Inscriptions et Belles-Lettres. 30 (1).
- Rodríguez Gutiérrez, Oliva (2003). "La proedria del teatro romano de Itálica: mármol al servicio de las elites" [The proedria of the Roman theatre of Itálica: marble as instrument of the elites] (PDF). Zephyrus. 56. Universidad de Salamanca: 155–181. ISSN 0514-7336.
- Valmin, Natan (1930). "Inscriptions de la Messénie" [Inscriptions of Messenia]. Bulletin de la Société royale des Lettres de Lund. 1928-1929. T. IV. 11 (2).
