= Europus (Almopia) =

Ancient town in Almopia, Macedonia, Greece

Coordinates: 40°56′44″N 22°06′59″E

Europus or Europos (Ancient Greek: Εὔρωπος) was a town of Almopia in ancient Macedonia.

The site of Europus is located near modern Chrisi (Chryse).
