= Kilkis (regional unit) =

Kilkis Περιφερειακή ενότητα Κιλκίς
- Regional unit
- Municipalities of Kilkis

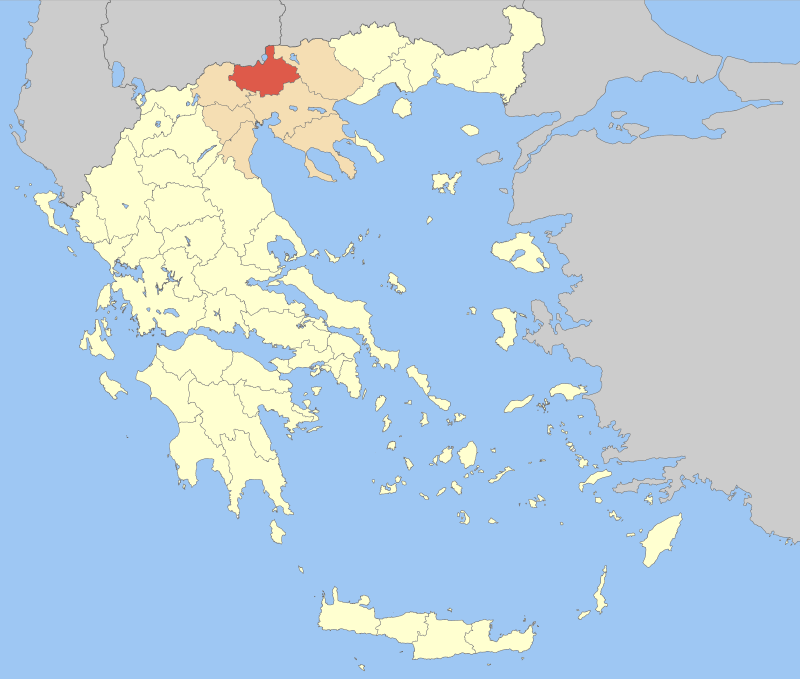
- Kilkis within Greece

- Location within Greece
- Coordinates: 41°0′N 22°50′E
- Country: Greece
- Administrative region: Central Macedonia
- Seat: Kilkis

Area
  - Total: 2,519 km^{2} (973 sq mi)

Population (2021)
  - Total: 70,477
  - Density: 27.98/km^{2} (72.46/sq mi)
- Time zone: UTC+2 (EET)
  - Summer (DST): UTC+3 (EEST)
- Postal code: 61x xx
- Area code: 234x0
- Vehicle registration: ΚΙ
- Website: www.kilkis.gr

Kilkis (Greek: Περιφερειακή ενότητα Κιλκίς) is one of the regional units of Greece, in the geographic region of Macedonia. It is part of the region of Central Macedonia. Its capital is the city of Kilkis.

== Geography ==
The geography of the regional unit of Kilkis is characterized by the wide and flat Axios river valley in the westcentral part, and mountain ranges on its western and northeastern edges. The mountain range in the west, on the border with Pella regional unit, is Mount Paiko (highest peak 1,650 m or 5,413 ft). In the north, the Kerkini range straddles the border with North Macedonia. At 1,874 m or 6,148 ft the highest peak in Kilkis regional unit is located here. The border with Serres regional unit to the northeast is formed by the lower Kroussia range (highest peak 1,179 m or 3,868 ft). Lake Doirani is situated in the north, shared with North Macedonia. Kilkis borders the Thessaloniki regional unit to the south.

The climate of the Kilkis regional unit is humid continental in the north, and humid subtropical in the lower regions.

== History ==
The area of the modern regional unit was part of the Kingdom of Macedonia from the 8th century BC until the Third Macedonian War (171 BC - 168 BC), when it became a part of the Roman Empire. At the division of the Roman Empire in 395 AD, the area joined the eastern part, later known as the Byzantine Empire. Between the 7th century and the 11th century, it changed hands between the Byzantine Empire and the Bulgarian Empire repeatedly. In the 13th and 14th century Western Europeans and Serbs briefly ruled the area. The Ottoman Empire conquered the area in 1371, and ruled it until the First Balkan War of 1912. In the Second Balkan War of 1913, the Greek army captured the area, which became part of Greece. It absorbed many of the Greeks from what is now the Republic of North Macedonia, especially from Gevgeli, Vogdantsa, Polyane and Stromnitsa.

In the aftermath of the Balkan Wars, World War I and the Greco-Turkish War (1919-1922) most of the Turkish and Bulgarian population of Kilkis emigrated, and many Greeks from Bulgaria, North Macedonia and Turkey settled in the area, as prescribed by the Treaty of Lausanne (1923). In fact, a very large segment of the population of Kilkis regional unit are in origin Caucasus Greeks (that is, Eastern Pontic Greeks) from the former Russian Imperial province of Kars Oblast in the South Caucasus. They left their homeland in the South Caucasus for Kilkis and other parts of Greek Macedonia, as well as southern Russia and Georgia, between 1919 and 1921, that is, between the main Greece-Turkey population exchange and Russia's cession of the Kars region back to Turkey as part of the Treaty of Brest Litovsk.

Until 1939, when created into a separate prefecture, the area was part of the Thessaloniki Prefecture. At the 2011 Kallikratis reform, the Kilkis Prefecture became a regional unit.

== Sites of interest ==
- Archaeological Museum of Kilkis
- Saint George's Cave in Kilkis
- Folklore Museum of Goumenissa
- Giapatzis' Medieval Watermill in Goumenissa
- Natural History Museum in Axioupoli
- Kilkis War Museum
- World War I museum in Skra, dedicated to the Battle of Skra-di-Legen
- Galazia limni (blue lagoon) with waterfalls, near Koupa
- Metalliou lake, near Pigi, Kilkis
- The picturesque villages of Paiko with Macedonian architecture, Goumenissa, Griva, Kastaneri and Karpi
- The mountainous massif of Kroussia
- The mountainous massif of Paiko
- The mountainous massif of Kerkini (Beles)
- Chilia Dentra (A Thousand Trees) in Mouries, a perennial forest of oaks and ash trees beside Doirani lake
- Doirani village, with fish taverns near lakeshore
- The archaeological site of ancient Ioron near Palatiano
- The archaeological site of Evropos
- The Monastery of Saints Rafael, Nicolaos and Irene, near Griva
- The Monastery of Nicodemus the Hagiorite, near Pentalofos
- Lake Pikrolimni, Natura 2000 protected wetland and location of spa for balneotherapy and pelotherapy

== Transport ==
The Thessaloniki–Alexandroupolis and Thessaloniki–Skopje railways run through the regional unit. There are also two main north–south road corridors: the A1 motorway (E75) and EO1 road, which run between Athens and the border with North Macedonia near Evzonoi; and the EO65. The Liti–Nea Santa National Road branches off the EO65 at Nea Santa, while the A25 motorway briefly straddles the eastern boundary near Isoma and Rizana.

== Administration ==
The regional unit Kilkis is subdivided into 2 municipalities. These are (number as in the map in the infobox):

- Paionia (2)
- Kilkis (1)

=== Prefecture ===
As a part of the 2011 Kallikratis government reform, the former Kilkis Prefecture (Greek: Νομός Κιλκίς) was transformed into a regional unit within the Central Macedonia region, without any change in boundaries. At the same time, the municipalities were reorganised, according to the table below.

New municipality	Old municipalities	Seat
Kilkis	Kilkis	Kilkis
Kilkis	Gallikos	Kilkis
Kilkis	Doirani	Kilkis
Kilkis	Kroussa	Kilkis
Kilkis	Mouries	Kilkis
Kilkis	Pikrolimni	Kilkis
Kilkis	Cherso	Kilkis
Paionia	Axioupoli	Polykastro
Paionia	Goumenissa	Polykastro
Paionia	Evropos	Polykastro
Paionia	Livadia	Polykastro
Paionia	Polykastro	Polykastro

=== Provinces ===
The former prefecture of Kilkis was subdivided into the following provinces:

Provinces of Kilkis Prefecture	Seat
Province of Kilkis	Kilkis
Province of Paionia	Goumenissa

Note: Provinces no longer hold any legal status in Greece.

== See also ==
- List of settlements in the Kilkis regional unit
