= List of settlements in the Kilkis regional unit =

This is a list of settlements in the Kilkis regional unit in Greece:

- Agia Paraskevi
- Agios Markos
- Agios Petros
- Akritas
- Amaranta
- Anavryto
- Anthofyto
- Antigoneia
- Aspros
- Axiochori
- Axioupoli
- Cherso
- Chorygi
- Chrysopetra
- Drosato
- Efkarpia
- Eiriniko
- Elliniko
- Eptalofos
- Evropos
- Evzonoi
- Fanos
- Filyria
- Fyska
- Gallikos
- Gerakari
- Gorgopi
- Goumenissa
- Griva
- Idomeni
- Iliolousto
- Isoma
- Kampanis
- Karpi
- Kastaneri
- Kastanies
- Kato Theodoraki
- Kentriko
- Kilkis
- Koiladi
- Kokkinia
- Korona
- Koronouda
- Kristoni
- Leipsydrio
- Limnotopos
- Livadia
- Mandres
- Mavroneri
- Megali Sterna
- Megali Vrysi
- Melanthio
- Mesia
- Mesiano
- Mikro Dasos
- Mikrokampos
- Mouries
- Myriofyto
- Nea Santa
- Neo Agioneri
- Neo Gynaikokastro
- Palaio Agioneri
- Pedino
- Pefkodasos
- Pentalofo
- Plagia, Kilkis
- Plagia, Paionia
- Polykastro
- Polypetro
- Pontoirakleia
- Pontokerasia
- Ryzia
- Skra
- Stathis
- Stathmos Mourion
- Stavrochori
- Terpyllos
- Theodosia
- Toumpa
- Tripotamos
- Vafiochori
- Vaptistis
- Vathy
- Xylokeratia

== See also ==
- List of towns and villages in Greece
