= Akritas, Kilkis =

Akritas Ακρίτας
- Community
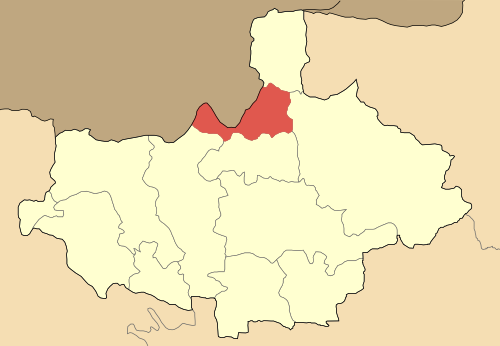
- Location within the regional unit

- Location within Greece
- Coordinates: 41°08′42.79″N 22°44′38.87″E
- Country: Greece
- Geographic region: Macedonia
- Administrative region: Central Macedonia
- Regional unit: Kilkis
- Municipality: Kilkis
- Municipal unit: Doirani
- Elevation: 220 m (720 ft)

Population (2021)
  - Community: 110
- Time zone: UTC+2 (EET)
  - Summer (DST): UTC+3 (EEST)
- Postal code: 610 03
- Area code: +30 23410
- Vehicle registration: ΚΙ

Akritas (Greek: Ακρίτας, old name: Greek: Βλαδάγια Vladaya / Vladagia) is a village situated in the municipal unit of Doirani of the municipality of Kilkis, in the Kilkis regional unit of Central Macedonia, Greece.

== Geography ==
The village is located 3.5 km south of Doiran Lake and the Greek village of Doirani.

The terrain around Akritas is hilly to the northwest, but to the southeast it is flat. (Note: Calculated from the variance in all elevation data (DEM 3 ") from Viewfinder Panoramas, within 10 km radius. sv:Lsjbot-algoritmnot) The highest point nearby is 331 metres above sea level, 1.0 km southwest of Akritas. (Note: Calculated from height data (DEM 3 ") from Viewfinder Panoramas.) Around Akritas it is quite sparsely populated, with 42 inhabitants per square kilometre. The nearest major community is Drosato, 5.5 km east of Akritas. The area around Akritas consists mostly of agricultural land.

The climate in the area is temperate . Average annual temperature in the neighbourhood is 16 °C . The warmest month is July, when the average temperature is 30 °C, and the coldest is January, with 3 °C. Average annual rainfall is 984 millimetres. The wettest month is February, with an average of 137 mm of precipitation, and the driest is August, with 32 mm of precipitation.

As per the Kallikratis plan, this village is a constituent part of the municipal unit of Doirani in the municipality of Kilkis. According to the 2021 Greek census, it has a population of 110 permanent residents.

== History ==
=== Etymology ===
According to the "Bulgarian Etymological Dictionary", the old name Vladagka originated from the personal name Vladay, preserved in 1577 in a Vlach-Bulgarian deed - the Old Polish personal name Włodau is comparable. The name is an adjective with the suffix -ja, ie Vladaeva ( village, ie village ) or genitive from Vladaj - the Serbian local name Vladaje, the Romanian Vlădaia and others are comparable . It is possible that the name is directly from the female personal name Vladaya, preserved in a Vlach-Bulgarian charter from 1610.

=== In Ottoman Empire ===
In the Ottoman tax registers of the non-Muslim population from the province of Avret Hisar from 1619 to 1620 it is noted that the village had 3 hanets (households) liable for jizya.

The "Ethnography of vilayets Adrianople, Monastir and Salonika", published in Constantinople in 1878 and reflects the statistics of the male population of 1873, Vlad (Vladya) is referred to as settlement in said Aurelia Hisar (Kilkis) with 50 households, the residents are 264 Bulgarians.

By 1900, according to the statistics of Vasil Kanchov ("Macedonia. Ethnography and Statistics"), Vladagka is a village in Doiran Kaza and has 150 Bulgarian inhabitants.

The entire population of the village is under the rule of the Bulgarian Exarchate. According to the secretary of the exarchist Dimitar Mishev ("La Macedoine et sa Population Chrétienne") in 1905 in Vladagka there were 232 Bulgarian exarchists and a Bulgarian school.

At the outbreak of the Balkan War in 1912, two people from Vladaya were Bulgarian volunteers in the Macedonian-Edirne militia.

=== In Greece ===
In 1913, after the Second Balkan War, the village incorporated into Greece and its Bulgarian inhabitants were expelled to Bulgaria. In the 1920s, Greek refugees settled in the place. After the Balkan wars, Sarakatsani settled in the village and after 1922, Pontic Greek refugees from Kerasounta (modern Giresun, Turkey) in the Black Sea were resettled here. In 1928 there were 86 refugee families with 293 inhabitants in the village. In 1926, the village was renamed to Akritas from Vladagka.

The Orthodox Church of St. George from 1884 was declared a historical monument on June 27, 1987. There is also a church "St. Anthony" from 1888 in the village.

In 2008, a monument was erected in the village for the victims of Genocide of Pontic Greeks.

In the village operates the Historical Museum - Akrita Outpost "Grigoris Afxentiou" in honor of the Greek Cypriot revolutionary and deputy leader of EOKA, who served as a reserve lieutenant in the Akrita outpost.

== See also ==
- List of settlements in the Kilkis regional unit

== Notes and citations ==
Notes

Citations
