= Pedino =

Pedino may refer to the following places in Greece:

- Pedino, Florina, a village in the Florina regional unit, part of the municipality Amyntaio
- Pedino, Kilkis, a village in the Kilkis regional unit
- Pedino, Lemnos, a village in the island of Lemnos
- Pedino, Lesvos, a village in the island of Lesvos
