= 71st Airmobile Brigade (Greece) =

71st Airmobile Infantry Brigade "Pontos"
- 71η Αερομεταφερόμενη Ταξιαρχία Πεζικού "Πόντος"
- Formation flag of the 71st Airmobile Infantry Brigade
- Active: 1940–41, 1945–94 (71st Infantry Regiment); 1995–2001 (71st Infantry Brigade); 2001–2009 (71st Airmobile Brigade); 2009–present (71st Airmobile Brigade "Pontos")
- Country: Greece
- Branch: Hellenic Army
- Type: Airmobile infantry
- Size: Brigade
- Part of: 1st Infantry Division; NATO Response Force; Balkan Battlegroup
- Garrison/HQ: Nea Santa (Macedonia)
- Mottos: On the wings of the winds Επί πτερύγων ανέμων Epi Pterigon Anemon
- Equipment: Equipment
- Engagements: World War II; German invasion of Greece; Greek Civil War; Operation Pyrsos
- Website: 71st Airmobile Brigade "Pontos"

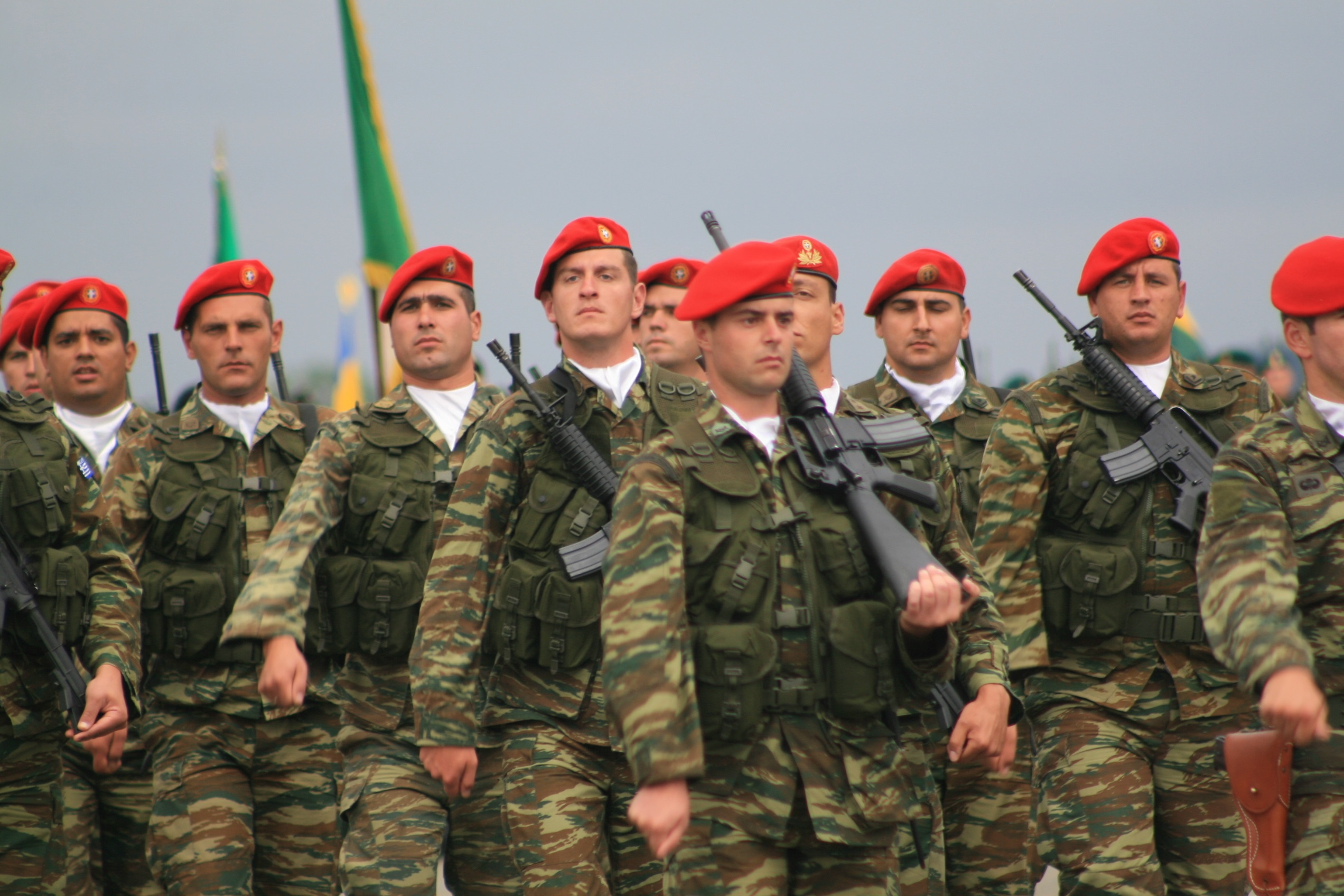
Soldiers of the 71st Airmobile Brigade of the Hellenic Army (2007)

The 71st Airmobile Brigade "Pontus" (Greek: 71η Αερομεταφερόμενη Ταξιαρχία «Πόντος», 71 A/M ΤΑΞ) is an airmobile infantry brigade of the Hellenic Army. The brigade was established after the reorganization of the 71st Infantry Brigade to an air assault formation. Members of the Brigade wear the red beret.

It is a part of the NATO Response Force (NRF) and of the HELBROC BG.

== History ==
The 71st Infantry Regiment was established in Drama, Greece on 28 October 1940 and took part in World War II along the borders of Bulgaria. During the German invasion in 1941 the regiment was based in the sector of Paranesti, where it won numerous engagements against German forces. When the Axis occupied the country, the Regiment was dissolved. It was reformed on 24 April 1945, after Greece was liberated.

In August, 1989 the 71st Infantry Regiment moved to the village of Nea Santa in Kilkis under the 1st Infantry Division. In August 1993 was reorganized to Brigade with full activation on 1 January 1995. From 1 Jan 1998 was placed under B CORPS as a Rapid Reaction Force.

On 27 October 2001 the Brigade was renamed to 71st Airmobile Brigade. By 26 September 2005 was placed under the command of 1st Infantry Division and the Operational control of B CORPS.

On 5 October 2009, after the decision of the Higher Military Board of the Hellenic Army General Staff, the 71st Airmobile Brigade was renamed to 71st Airmobile Brigade «PONTOS».

The 71st Airmobile Infantry Brigade forms the basis of the Greek-led HELBROC BG, a Battlegroup of the European Union, composed of units from Greece, Bulgaria, Romania, Cyprus and Ukraine. Elements of the Brigade also make up part of the NATO Response Force.

== Emblem and motto ==
The emblem of the unit shows a falcon with open wings ready to land and two spears, framed by laurel leaves.

The falcon is the symbol of dynamic intervention by air in every battle, and the spears are weapons which used in ancient wars.

The motto is "On the wings of the winds" (Greek: «Επί πτερύγων ανέμων», romanized: "Epí pterígon anémon"). It is inspired from the 104 psalm of David.

== Structure ==
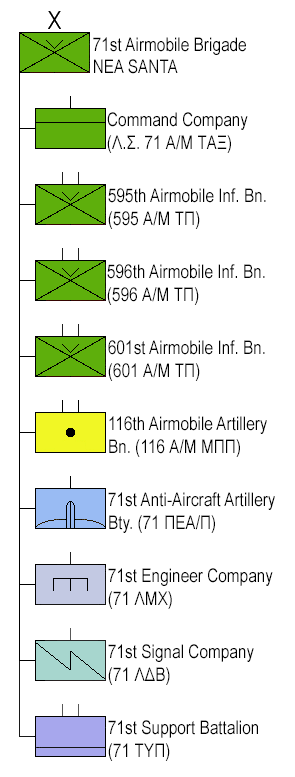
Structure of the 71st Airborne Brigade

71st Airmobile Infantry Brigade (71η Α/Μ ΤΑΞ) based at Nea Santa (Macedonia)

- HQ Company (ΛΣ/71ης Α/Μ ΤΑΞ)
- 595th Airmobile Infantry Battalion (595ο A/M ΤΠ)
- 596th Airmobile Infantry Battalion (596ο A/M ΤΠ)
- 601st Airmobile Infantry Battalion (601ο A/M ΤΠ)
- 116th Airmobile Artillery Battalion (116η Α/Μ ΜΠΠ)
- 71st Engineer Company (71ος ΛΜΧ)
- 71st Light Air Defence Battery (71η ΠΕΑ/ΑΠ)
- 71st Signal Company (71ος ΛΔΒ)
- 71st Support Battalion (71ο ΤΥΠ)

== Training ==
The units of the 71st Airmobile Infantry Brigade carry out a full cycle of training with emphasis in the following areas.

- Physical military training
- Individual advanced tactics and advanced weapons training
- Advanced shooting training
- Landmines
- Special night training
- Collaboration and training with helicopters and cargo planes
- Airmobile operations in various live exercises
- Training in peace support operations and operations in built up areas

== Equipment ==
- Assault rifles – M16
- Machine guns – FN Minimi, M2HB
- Artillery – OTO Melara Mod 56
- Support weapons – MILAN, Carl Gustaf, M72 LAW, HAI Mortar 81mm
- Vehicles – Panhard VBL
- Helicopters – UH-1 Iroquois, NHI NH90, CH-47 Chinook (as operated by 1st Army Aviation Brigade)
