= Drosato =

Drosato (Greek: Δροσάτο) may refer to several places in Greece:

- Drosato, Corfu, a village in the island of Corfu
- Drosato, Karditsa, a village in the Karditsa regional unit
- Drosato, Achaea, a village in Achaea
- Drosato, Kilkis, a village in the Kilkis regional unit
- Drosato, Phocis, a village in Phocis
