= Perinthos =

Perinthos (Ancient Greek: Πέρινθος) may refer to:

- Perinthos, Syria, one of the cities founded by Seleukos
- Perinthos, Kilkis, community near Kilkis, Greece, founded in 1928 from refugees, previously called Kavakli
- Perinthus, ancient Perinthos, later called Heracleia, Samian colony in the European coast of Propontis
