= Pyrgotos =

Pyrgotos Πυργωτός
- Settlement
- Location within Greece
- Coordinates: 40°59′N 22°52′E
- Country: Greece
- Administrative region: Central Macedonia
- Regional unit: Kilkis
- Municipality: Kilkis
- Municipal unit: Gallikos
- Community: Chrysopetra
- Elevation: 100 m (330 ft)

Population (2021)
  - Total: 112
- Time zone: UTC+2 (EET)
  - Summer (DST): UTC+3 (EEST)
- Postal code: 611 00
- Area code: 23410
- Vehicle registration: NI, ΚΙ*

Pyrgotos (Greek: Πυργωτό, old name: Greek: Κιουλελή Kyuleli / Külahli) is a village south of the City of Kilkis in the Kilkis regional unit, Greece. It is part of the municipal unit Gallikos and has a population of 112 people (2021).
