= Leventochori =

Leventochori (Greek: Λεβεντοχώρι) may refer to two places in Greece:

- Leventochori, Elis, a village in the municipality of Pyrgos, Elis
- Leventochori, Kilkis, a village in the municipality of Kilkis, Kilkis regional unit
