= Leventochori, Kilkis =

Coordinates: 40.952°N 22.821°E

Leventochori (Greek: Λεβεντοχώρι, before 1927: Ασικλάρ - Asiklar) is a village in the municipality of Kilkis, Kilkis regional unit, Greece. 6 km southwest of the city centre, it is part of the community of Mesiano. In 2001, it had a population of 266. According to the Bulgarian ethnographer Vasil Kanchov, the village had 140 inhabitants in 1900, all of them of Turkish origin. Its present population consists of descendants of refugees from the village Harapa near Tsalka in Georgia and from other parts of the Caucasus and Eastern Thrace, and some Sarakatsanoi families. The village has a church of the saints Constantine and Helena.

== Population ==
Year	Population
1991	301
2001	266

== See also ==
- List of settlements in the Kilkis regional unit
