= Elliniko (disambiguation) =

Elliniko is a suburban city in southcentral Athens.

Elliniko or Ellinikon (Greek: Ελληνικό, "Hellenic, Greek") may also refer to the following places in Greece:

- Ellinikon International Airport, Elliniko
- Hellinikon Olympic Complex
- Elliniko, Achaea, a village in Farres municipal unit
- Elliniko, Arcadia, a village in Gortynia municipality
- Elliniko, Tyros, a seaside village in Tyros municipal unit
- Elliniko, Argolis, a village in Argos municipal unit
- Elliniko, Corinthia, a village in Evrostina municipal unit
- Elliniko, Ioannina, a village in the Ioannina regional unit
- Elliniko, Kilkis, a village in the Kilkis regional unit
- Elliniko, Laconia, a village in Laconia

== See also ==
- Aglianico or Ellenico, an Italian grape of Greek origin
- Ellinika, the romanized name for the Greek language
- Ellinika, Aetolia-Acarnania, a village in Aetolia-Acarnania
- Ellinika, Euboea, a village in Euboea regional unit
