= II Army Corps (Greece) =

Coordinates: 40°17′30″N 21°46′54.4″E

- Β' Σώμα Στρατού
- Formation flag of the II Army Corps
- Active: 1913–1941, 1946–2013
- Country: Greece
- Branch: Hellenic Army
- Part of: Army of Asia Minor, First Army
- Garrison/HQ: Veroia
- Motto(s): "Either With It or On It"
- Engagements: Macedonian front, Asia Minor Campaign, Greco-Italian War, Greek Civil War, Korean War

The II Army Corps (Greek: Β' Σώμα Στρατού, abbr. Β' ΣΣ) was an army corps of the Hellenic Army. Established in 1913, it took part in all subsequent wars of Greece. Since 1998 the corps functioned as a strategic reserve force, and comprised the Army's special forces and army aviation units, as well as mechanized infantry. It was disbanded on 29 November 2013.

== History ==
The II Army Corps was founded after the Balkan Wars, on 17 August 1913 (O.S.). Initially headquartered at Athens, it was transferred to Patras in December of the same year. During World War I it fought in the Macedonian front, and then participated in the Asia Minor Campaign. Following the Greek retreat in August 1922, the Corps was reconstituted on 7 September 1922 (O.S.) in eastern Macedonia, as part of the Army of Evros.

The Corps took part in the Greco-Italian War of 1940–41 from the beginning, and lasted until the Greek capitulation and disbandment of the Greek Army after the German invasion of Greece in April 1941. After liberation from the German occupation, II Army Corps was re-established in 1946 at Larissa and took part in the Greek Civil War. After the end of the Civil War in 1949, the Corps was moved to Kozani, where it remained until July 1962, when it moved to Veroia, its final base. During this period, the Corps provided the bulk of the Greek Expeditionary Force in Korea.

From 1 January 1998, the Corps ceased to be a territorial formation, and was transformed into a rapid reaction and strategic reserve force under the operational command of the Hellenic National Defence General Staff. On 1 July 2002, the Corps became a combined arms headquarters, and was renamed four months later into the Reaction, Reinforcement, Reserve Forces Headquarters (Στρατηγείο Δυνάμεων Αντίδρασης, Ενίσχυσης, Εφεδρείας Stratiyio Dynameon Adidrasis, Enischysis, Efedrias [ΣΔΑΕΕ (Β’ΣΣ)]). On 19 July 2005, it reverted to a purely Army command, and returned to its former name. Following a wide-ranging defence review that decided upon a new force structure for the Greek armed forces, in April 2013 KYSEA decided the disbandment of II Army Corps, with its subordinate formations to come under the direct command of the First Army. The Corps was dissolved on 29 November 2013.

== Structure (2008) ==
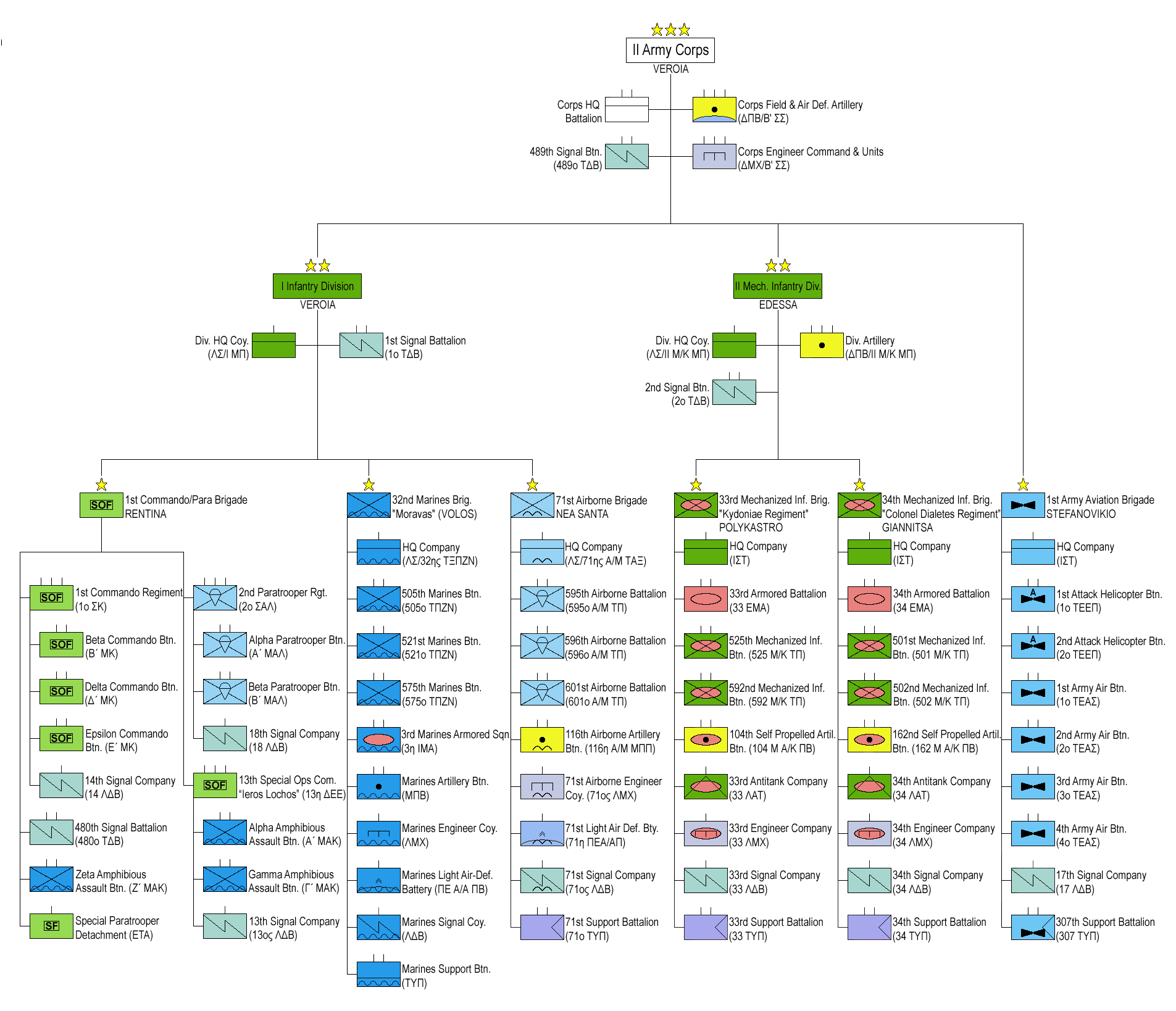
II Corps Structure

- II Army Corps (Β' Σώμα Στρατού), based at Veroia, Macedonia which includes
  - Corps Field and Air Defense Artillery Command and units (ΔΠΒ/Β' ΣΣ)
  - Corps Engineer Command and units (ΔΜΧ/Β' ΣΣ)
  - 489th Signal Battalion (489ο ΤΔΒ)
  - Corps HQ Battalion
  - I Infantry Division(I ΜΠ), based at Veroia, Macedonia organised in
    - 1st Signal Battalion (1ο ΤΔΒ)
    - Division HQ Company (ΛΣ/Ι ΜΠ)
    - 1st Raider/Paratrooper Brigade (1η ΤΑΞΚΔ-ΑΛ), based at Rentina, Macedonia
      - 480th Signal Battalion (480ο ΤΔΒ - 480 Tagma Diavivaseon)
      - 1st Raider Regiment (1ο ΣΚ - 1 Syntagma Katadromon)
        - II Raider Squadron (Β΄ ΜΚ - Vita Mira Katadromon)
        - IV Raider Squadron (Δ΄ ΜΚ - Delta Mira Katadromon)
        - V Raider Squadron (Ε΄ ΜΚ - Epsilon Mira Katadromon)
        - 14th Signal Company (14 ΛΔΒ - 14 Lochos Diavivaseon)
      - 2nd Paratrooper Regiment (2ο ΣΑΛ - 2 Syntagma Alexiptotiston)
        - 1st Paratrooper Squadron (1η ΜΑΛ - 1 Mira Alexiptotiston)
        - 2nd Paratrooper Squadron (2η ΜΑΛ - 2 Mira Alexiptotiston)
        - 18th Signal Company (18 ΛΔΒ - 18 Lochos Diavivaseon)
      - 13th Special Operations Command "Ieros Lochos" (13η ΔΕΕ Ιερός Λόχος - 13 Dioikisi Eidikon Epiheiriseon)
        - I Amphibious Raider Squadron (Α΄ ΜΑΚ - Alpha Mira Amfivion Katadromon)
        - III Amphibious Raider Squadron (Γ΄ ΜΑΚ - Gamma Mira Amfivion Katadromon)
        - 13th Signal Company (13ος ΛΔΒ - 13 Lochos Diavivaseon)
      - Special Paratrooper Unit (ETA - Eidiko Tmima Alexiptotiston)
      - VII Amphibious Raider Squadron (Ζ΄ ΜΑΚ - Zeta Mira Amfivion Katadromon)
    - 32nd Marines Brigade "Moravas" (32η ΤΑΞΠΝ Mοράβας), based at Volos, Thessaly
      - HQ Company (ΛΣ/32ης ΤΞΠΖΝ)
      - 505th Marines Battalion (505ο ΤΠΝ)
      - 521st Marines Battalion (521ο ΤΠΝ)
      - 575th Marines Battalion (575ο ΤΠΝ)
      - Marines Artillery Battalion (32η ΜΠΠ)
      - Marines Armoured Squadron (3η ΙΜΑ)
      - Marines Engineer Company (32ος ΛΜΧ)
      - Marines Light Air Defence Battery (32η ΠΕΑ/ΑΠ)
      - Marines Signal Company (32ος ΛΔΒ)
      - Marines Support Battalion (32ο ΤΥΠ)
    - 71st Airmobile Infantry Brigade (71η Α/M ΤΑΞ), based at Nea Santa, Macedonia
      - HQ Company (ΛΣ/71ης Α/Μ ΤΑΞ)
      - 595th Airborne Battalion (595ο A/M ΤΠ)
      - 596th Airborne Battalion (596ο A/M ΤΠ)
      - 601st Airborne Battalion (601ο A/M ΤΠ)
      - 116th Airborne Artillery Battalion (116η Α/Μ ΜΠΠ)
      - 71st Airborne Engineer Company (71ος ΛΜΧ)
      - 71st Light Air Defence Battery (71η ΠΕΑ/ΑΠ)
      - 71st Signal Company (71ος ΛΔΒ)
      - 71st Support Battalion (71ο ΤΥΠ)
  - II Mechanized Infantry Division (II Μ/Κ ΜΠ), based at Edessa, Macedonia organised in
    - Division Artillery Command and units (ΔΠΒ/ΙΙ Μ/Κ ΜΠ)
    - 2nd Signal Battalion (2ο ΤΔΒ)
    - Division HQ Company (ΛΣ/ΙΙ Μ/Κ ΜΠ)
    - 33rd Mechanized Infantry Brigade "Kydoniae Regiment" (33η Μ/Κ ΤΑΞ Σύνταγμα Κυδωνιών), based at Polykastro, Macedonia
      - HQ Company (ΙΣΤ)
      - 33rd Armored Battalion (33 ΕΜΑ)
      - 506th Mechanized Infantry Battalion (506 M/K ΤΠ)
      - 525th Mechanized Infantry Battalion (525 M/K ΤΠ)
      - 104th Self Propelled Artillery Battalion (104 Μ Α/K ΠΒ)
      - 33rd Antitank Company (33 ΛΑΤ)
      - 33rd Engineer Company (33 ΛΜΧ)
      - 33rd Signal Company (33 ΛΔΒ)
      - 33rd Support Battalion (33 ΤΥΠ)
    - 34th Mechanized Infantry Brigade "Colonel Dialetes Detachment" (34η Μ/Κ ΤΑΞ Απόσπασμα Σχου Διαλέτη), based at Giannitsa, Macedonia
      - HQ Company (ΙΣΤ)
      - 34th Armored Battalion (34 ΕΜΑ)
      - 501st Mechanized Infantry Battalion (501 M/K ΤΠ)
      - 507th Mechanized Infantry Battalion (507 M/K ΤΠ)
      - 162nd Self Propelled Artillery Battalion (108 Μ Α/K ΠΒ)
      - 34th Antitank Company (34 ΛΑΤ)
      - 34th Engineer Company (34 ΛΜΧ)
      - 34th Signal Company (34 ΛΔΒ)
      - 34th Support Battalion (34 ΤΥΠ)
  - 1st Army Aviation Brigade (1ο ΤΑΞΑΣ), based at Stefanovikio, Thessaly which consists of
    - HQ Company
    - 307th Support Battalion, based at Stefanovikio, Thessaly
    - 17th Signal Company (17 ΛΔΒ)
    - 1st Attack Helicopter Battalion (1o ΤΕΕΠ), based at Stefanovikio, Thessaly
    - 2nd Attack Helicopter Battalion (2o ΤΕΕΠ), based at Megara, Attica
    - 1st Army Air Battalion (1o ΤΕΑΣ), based at Stefanovikio, Thessaly
    - 2nd Army Air Battalion (2ο ΤΕΑΣ), based at Megara, Attica
    - 3rd Army Air Battalion (3ο ΤΕΑΣ), based at Alexandreia, Macedonia
    - 4th Army Air Battalion (4ο ΤΕΑΣ), based at Megara, Attica

== Emblem and Motto ==
The Corps' emblem depicts an Ancient Spartan shield over crossed spears. It symbolizes strength, militancy and determination of the ancients.

The motto of the II Army Corps is "Either With It, or On It" (Greek: Ἢ τὰν ἢ ἐπὶ τᾶς, I tan i epi tas).

Spartan mothers would utter the phrase to their sons before they went to war, reminding them to return victorious with the shield, or be brought back dead upon it. Returning home without a shield meant the soldier deserted (A hoplite could not escape the field of battle unless he tossed away the heavy and cumbersome shield).
