= Mandres, Kilkis =

Village in Central Macedonia, Greece

Mandres Μάνδρες
- Community
- Location within Greece
- Coordinates: 40°59′N 22°52′E
- Country: Greece
- Administrative region: Central Macedonia
- Regional unit: Kilkis
- Municipality: Kilkis
- Municipal unit: Gallikos
- Elevation: 100 m (330 ft)

Population (2021)
  - Community: 385
- Time zone: UTC+2 (EET)
  - Summer (DST): UTC+3 (EEST)
- Postal code: 611 00
- Area code: 23410
- Vehicle registration: NI, ΚΙ*

Mandres (Greek: Μάνδρες, Bulgarian: Хамбаркьой) is a village South of the City of Kilkis in the Kilkis regional unit, Greece. It is part of the municipal unit Gallikos and has a population of 385 people (2021). Until 1926, Mandres was known as Ampar Kioi (Greek: Αμπάρ Κιόι). The name was also written as Ambar Köy.

== History ==
Ambar Koy was mainly a Slavic speaking settlement and its population intermarried with other Slavic speaking villages in the area. In the early 1900s, Vasil Kanchov stated that the local population was composed of 300 Bulgarians and 66 Turks, whereas Hilmi Pasha described the village as inhabited only by 195 Bulgarians. During the period of the Balkan Wars, the Greek army destroyed the settlement and it was repopulated by people from the village of Mandritsa in Bulgaria. Until World War II, relatives from both villages would visit each other.

In the 1980s only middle aged and elderly generations within the village had knowledge of an Albanian dialect. The Mandres Albanian dialect is similar to that of Mandritsa and sharply differs from other varieties of the Albanian language. For example the gender system (masculine and feminine) present in all varieties of Albanian has disappeared from the Mandres Albanian dialect due to influence from the Turkish language when the population in the past lived near Turkey.
