= Gallikos =

Gallikos Γαλλικός
- Municipal unit
- Location within the regional unit

- Location within Greece
- Coordinates: 40°52′N 22°53′E
- Country: Greece
- Administrative region: Central Macedonia
- Regional unit: Kilkis
- Municipality: Kilkis

Area
  - Municipal unit: 149.1 km^{2} (57.6 sq mi)

Population (2021)
  - Municipal unit: 4,906
  - Municipal unit density: 32.90/km^{2} (85.22/sq mi)
  - Community: 794
- Time zone: UTC+2 (EET)
  - Summer (DST): UTC+3 (EEST)
- Postal code: 611 00
- Area code: 23410
- Vehicle registration: NI, ΚΙ*
- Website: gallikos.gr

Gallikos (Greek: Γαλλικός) is a village and a former municipality in the Kilkis regional unit, Greece. Since the 2011 local government reform it is part of the municipality Kilkis, of which it is a municipal unit. The municipal unit has an area of 149.054 km^{2}. Population 6,343 (2011). The seat of the municipality was in the village of Kampanis.

The municipality Gallikos was created after 13 small villages in the area south of the city of Kilkis merged in the late 1990s when the Greek government implemented its Kapodistrias project to fuse - and thus limit the number of - local authorities in the country.

== Subdivisions ==
The following villages are part of the municipal unit:

Villages of Gallikos Municipality
Community	Village	Population (2021)
Chrysopetra	Chrysopetra	57
Chrysopetra	Fanari	48
Chrysopetra	Laodikino	135
Chrysopetra	Peristeri	115
Chrysopetra	Pyrgotos	112
Gallikos	Gallikos	794
Kampanis	Kampanis	977
Kampanis	Mylos	22
Mandres	Mandres	385
Nea Santa	Nea Santa	1,235
Nea Santa	Panteleimon	347
Pedino	Pedino	655
Pedino	Perinthos	24

== Transport ==
The village is served by Gallikos railway station on the Thessaloniki–Alexandroupoli line.
