= Metalliko, Kilkis =

Metalliko Μεταλλικό
- Settlement
- Location within Greece
- Coordinates: 41°01′N 22°49′E
- Country: Greece
- Administrative region: Central Macedonia
- Regional unit: Kilkis
- Municipality: Kilkis
- Municipal unit: Kilkis
- Community: Kilkis

Population (2021)
  - Total: 288
- Time zone: UTC+2 (EET)
  - Summer (DST): UTC+3 (EEST)

Metalliko (Greek: Μεταλλικό, meaning 'mineral', before 1926: Γιάννες - Giannes; Macedonian Slavic: Јанес, Janes; Bulgarian: Янешево, Yaneshevo) is a settlement in the city of Kilkis, in northern Greece, located 6 km northwest of downtown Kilkis. In 2021 the settlement's population was 288. The village is named after a nearby spring of mineral water. Metalliko is 19 km south of Doirani, which is a border crossing into North Macedonia. Metalliko has a train station on the line from Thessaloniki to Serres and Alexandroupoli.

== History ==
In ancient times (12th century BC), Phrygians founded the town Vragylos in the place where Metalliko now lies. Vragylos decayed during the Roman times. The area was ruled by the Ottomans until the Balkan Wars of 1913. It was inhabited by Turks, Bulgarians and Greeks at that time. It became a part of Greece in 1913 and was then settled by Greek refugees from Asia Minor and people from other parts of Greek Macedonia, many of them arrived during the Greco-Turkish War (1919-1922).

Many of the inhabitants of Metalliko were followers of the Greek Communist Party during the civil war which followed the Second World War.

== Transport ==
The settlement has a station which is served by Proastiakos services to Thessaloniki.

== Population ==
Year	Population
1991	412
2001	371
2011	386
2021	288
