= Kampanis =

Village in Central Macedonia, Greece

Kampanis Καμπάνης
- Community
- Location within Greece
- Coordinates: 40°59′N 22°52′E
- Country: Greece
- Administrative region: Central Macedonia
- Regional unit: Kilkis
- Municipality: Kilkis
- Municipal unit: Gallikos
- Elevation: 100 m (330 ft)

Population (2021)
  - Community: 999
- Time zone: UTC+2 (EET)
  - Summer (DST): UTC+3 (EEST)
- Postal code: 611 00
- Area code: 23410
- Vehicle registration: NI, ΚΙ*

Kampanis (Greek: Καμπάνης, Bulgarian: Караджа Кадър Karadja Kadar) is a village south of the city of Kilkis in the Kilkis regional unit, Greece. It is part of the municipal unit Gallikos. The community Kampanis (pop. 999 in 2021) consists of the villages Kampanis and Mylos. Kampanis was named after a Greek army officer who died in the area during the Second Balkan War.
