= Battle of Kilkis (1944) =

1944 battle of the Greek Civil War

- Part of the Greek Civil War
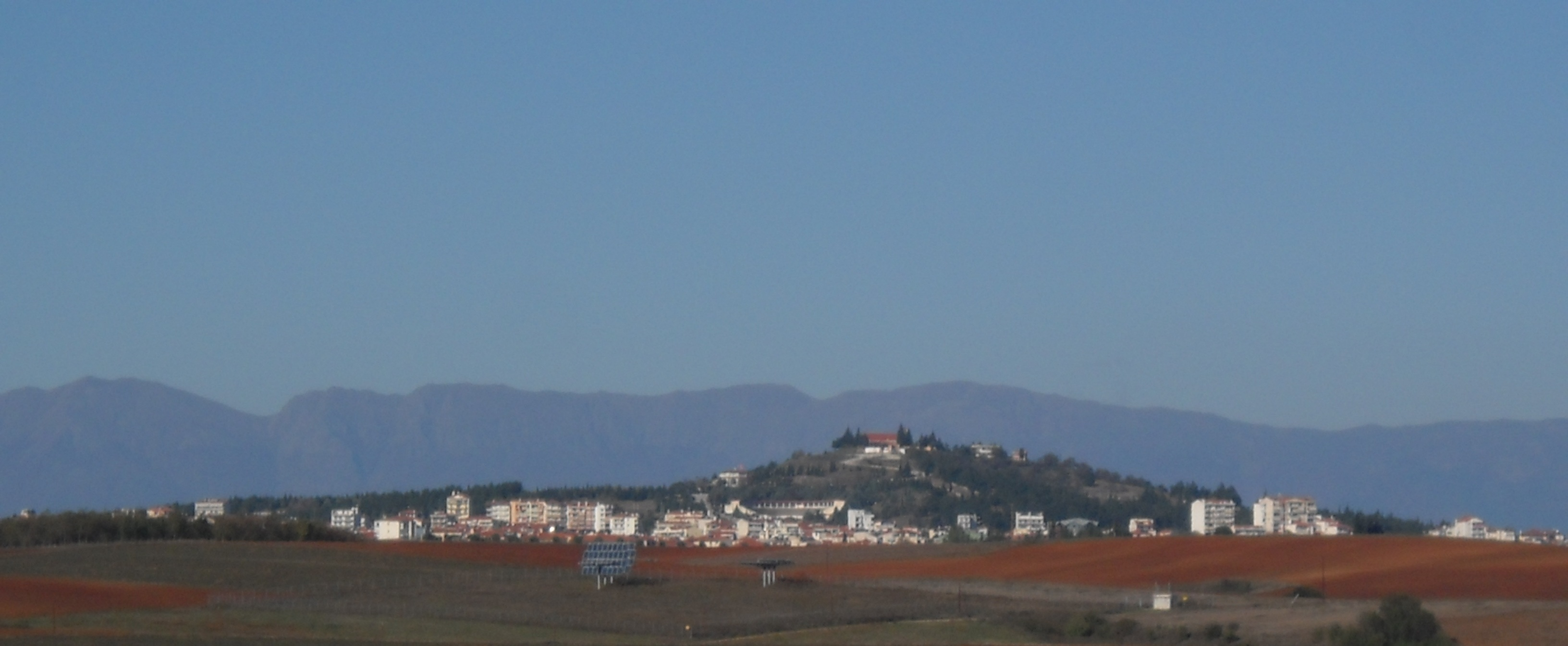
- Kilkis in 2012
Date	4 November 1944
Location	Kilkis, Greece 40°59′N 22°52′E
Result	ELAS victory

Belligerents
ELAS	Security Battalions; EDES; EES

Commanders and leaders
Sarantis Protopapas	Kyriakos Papadopoulos (Kisa Batzak) †

Strength
7,000–10,000	7,300–9,000

Casualties and losses
118–180 dead 410–800 wounded	1,500 killed 2,190 captured

The Battle of Kilkis was an armed conflict between communist resistance organisation ELAS and a coalition of collaborationist Security Battalions, nationalist resistance organisations EDES and the National Greek Army (EES). On 4 November 1944, ELAS captured Kilkis after nine hours of fighting. The nationalists suffered many casualties during the battle and in prisoner killings afterwards.

== Background ==
On 28 October 1940, Italy had declared war on Greece, beginning the Greco-Italian War, expecting a swift victory. The invasion failed and the Italians were pushed back into Albania. On 6 April 1941, Germany intervened to support its struggling ally. The small Greek force defending the Metaxas Line on the Greco–Bulgarian border was defeated by the better equipped and numerically superior German invasion force. The German penetration deep into Greece made further resistance at the Albanian front pointless, ending the Battle of Greece in the favour of the Axis Powers. Greece was subjected to a triple occupation by Germany, Italy and Bulgaria. In Greek Macedonia the KKE, communist-led Greek People's Liberation Army (ELAS) emerged as the most powerful resistance organisation.

In 1943, ELAS began disarming smaller non-communist guerrilla groups and incorporating them in its ranks or disbanding them. ELAS justified its action by accusing right-wing groups of collaboration with the German occupation authorities, a charge in which, according to SOE officer Chris Woodhouse, "there was some justice [...] because Greek nationalists, like Mihailović in Yugoslavia, regarded the Germans as a less serious enemy than the Bulgarians or the Communists". EAM-ELAS constantly viewed any group not belonging to itself with distrust and accused them as "collaborators" but in many cases this backfired and became a self-fulfilling prophecy, as the remnants of the right-wing groups joined the Germans against ELAS.

During the closing stages of the Axis occupation, Axis troops withdrew from northern Greece. Fearing reprisals from ELAS, members of the collaborationist Security Battalions, right wing resistance groups (EDES and National Greek Army (EES) and their civilian supporters congregated at Kilkis. The British supervised Caserta Agreement, between ELAS and the Greek government-in-exile, of September 1944 had characterised all units associated with the Security Battalions as enemy combatants and ordered them to surrender to the ΧΙ Division of ELAS. By October 1944, approximately 10,000 people had sought refuge in Kilkis.

Security Battalion commanders debated whether they should entrench themselves in Kilkis or move. The decision was taken to remain in Kilkis, despite the fact that the local population was sympathetic to ELAS. On 30 October, the defenders took positions around Ano Apostoloi, Mesoi Apostoloi and Kato Apostoloi. The following day those positions were harassed by small bands of ELAS fighters. Later on Konstantinos Papadopoulos, one of the most powerful Security Battalion commanders, voiced his disagreement with the way the defences were organised. His unit of 1,500 men left for the village of Mouries, promising to return in the case of an attack on the city.

== Battle ==
On the morning of 4 November, ELAS attacked Kilkis and captured the tactically important Agios Georgios hill. The communists emerged victorious after nine hours of bitter street fighting. ELAS casualties numbered 118 to 180 dead and 410 to 800 wounded and the defenders lost 1,500 killed and 2,190 captured. After the battle scores of prisoners were executed in acts of revenge by individual ELAS members; their number has not been accurately estimated. Other prisoners were held in dismal conditions in tobacco warehouses or were transferred to a concentration camp in Thessaloniki. Sources sympathetic to the nationalists put the total number of those killed in action or executed after it at 7,432 dead.

== Aftermath ==
The battle has been noted as the bloodiest clash between communist and nationalist bands in the prelude to the Greek Civil War. On 6 November 1967, just a few months after the establishment of junta, the minister of internal affairs Stylianos Pattakos and minister of northern Greece Dimitrios Patilis conducted the first memorial service in honour of the defenders of Kilkis. A year later the junta erected a memorial honouring victims of Slavo-Communism killed in the Kilkis region during the occupation and annual state sponsored memorial services were held there until the fall of the regime in 1974. In 1992, the city council constructed a second memorial next to the town hall, to members of all resistance organisations of Kilkis. In 2002, private individuals sympathetic to the communist cause erected a statue honouring members of communist resistance organisations that operated during World War II and the Greek Civil War. The battle remains a politically divisive issue in the city, as separate commemorative events are held on all three memorials.

== See also ==
- Meligalas
