= Pedino, Kilkis =

Pedino Πεδινό
- Community
- Location within Greece
- Coordinates: 40°59′N 22°52′E
- Country: Greece
- Administrative region: Central Macedonia
- Regional unit: Kilkis
- Municipality: Kilkis
- Municipal unit: Gallikos
- Elevation: 120 m (390 ft)

Population (2021)
  - Community: 679
- Time zone: UTC+2 (EET)
  - Summer (DST): UTC+3 (EEST)
- Postal code: 611 00
- Area code: 23410
- Vehicle registration: NI, ΚΙ*
- Website: https://www.pedino.gr

Pedino (Greek: Πεδινό) is a village in the Kilkis regional unit, Greece. The community Pedino (pop. 679 in 2021) consists of the villages Pedino and Perinthos. There were approx 1400 registered voters in the 2006 local elections. However, many voters reside in the big nearby cities of Kilkis and Thessaloniki and retain their voting rights to the village.

The village has a large population of Greek Thracians (Θρακιωτες) from the area of Eastern Thrace, or Eastern Romylia as it also known. A majority emigrated to Pedino from the villages Neo Gennikio, Aivali, Alepli & Koumbourlari, Eastern Thrace. The exact location of the villages in Turkey is not known but they are close to Saranta Ekklisies (Σαράντα Εκκλησίες, Kırklareli in Turkish). The new village was established by refugees, mostly as part of the Population Exchange between Greece and Turkey in 1923 Exchange of Greek Orthodox and Muslim Populations, in addition to any refugees fleeing Turkish persecution after the 1922 Greek military campaign in Asia Minor.

The village is part of the municipal unit Gallikos along with the villages of Nea Santa, Galliko, Kambani, Mandres and other smaller villages.

Pedino was built in the location of the old village of Hasanova or Hasan Obasi .

The Economy of the village until the 1970s was agricultural, mainly production of wheat and barley. In the last 20–30 years the village has seen growth in other less traditional industries.

There is a primary school serving approximately 80 children.
