= Fyska =

Village in Greece

Fyska Φύσκα
- Community
- Location within Greece
- Coordinates: 41°06′37″N 22°59′29″E
- Country: Greece
- Administrative region: Central Macedonia
- Regional unit: Kilkis
- Municipality: Kilkis
- Municipal unit: Kroussa

Population (2021)
  - Community: 167
- Time zone: UTC+2 (EET)
  - Summer (DST): UTC+3 (EEST)
- Postal code: 57 200
- Area code: +30 23410
- Vehicle registration: ΚΙ

Fyska (Greek: Φύσκα, before 1926: Πλανίτσα - Planitsa) is a village in the regional unit of Kilkis. It is part of the municipal unit of Kroussa. In the census of 2021 Fyska had 167 inhabitants.

== History ==
Most inhabitants moved from Fyska to cities like Kilkis or Thessaloniki during the mid 20th century. The village used to have some 1000 inhabitants. The village was created during the time of the Pontian genocide in Turkey (also known as the Ottoman Empire) during the 1920s when many Pontians fled Turkey to settle in Greece.

== Industry ==
Residents of Fyska are mainly engaged in agriculture and animal husbandry. The main crops are wheat farmers and tobacco.

== Football team ==
Fyska has a football team called Irakli Fyskas, Greek (Ηρακλή Φύσκας).
