= Techni Art Association =

Greek art association

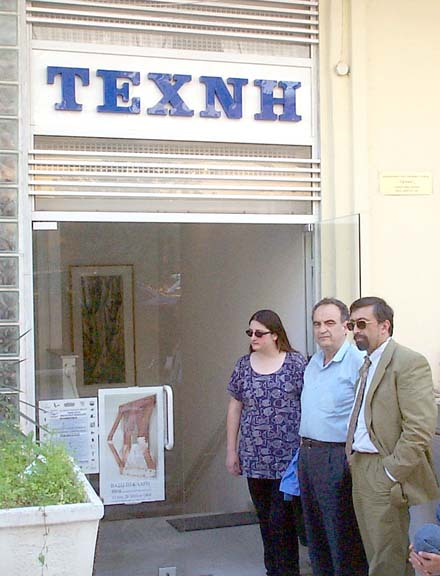
Outside view

The Techni Art Association was founded in the city of Kilkis in Central Macedonia, Greece in 1980 as a branch of the association of the same name in Thessaloniki. It runs classes in painting, ballet, piano, and guitar, a 3,000-volume library, exhibitions of rocks, the written word, and other themes, and a drama group supervised by the actor Dimitris Karellis.

The association owns an exhibition space with two rooms (named after the Kouros of Europos and Manolis Andronikos), as also a permanent collection of, mainly, paintings, which is made up of works donated by artists who have held solo exhibitions with Tehni. The permanent collection is in storage, the main rooms being used to exhibit works by both new and established artists.

The photographs are from Vasso Peklaris’s exhibition of copper-fibre tapestry constructions, which was held at the end of May 1999 in the Kouros of Europos Room.

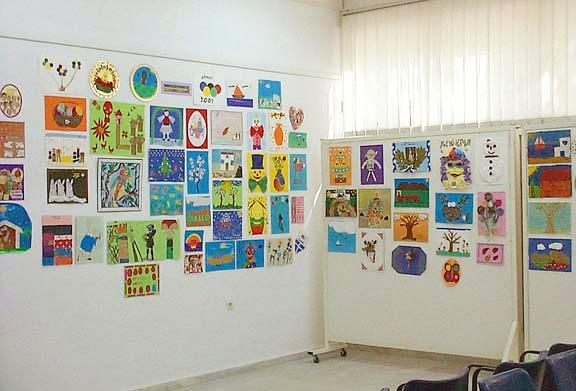
Students paintings

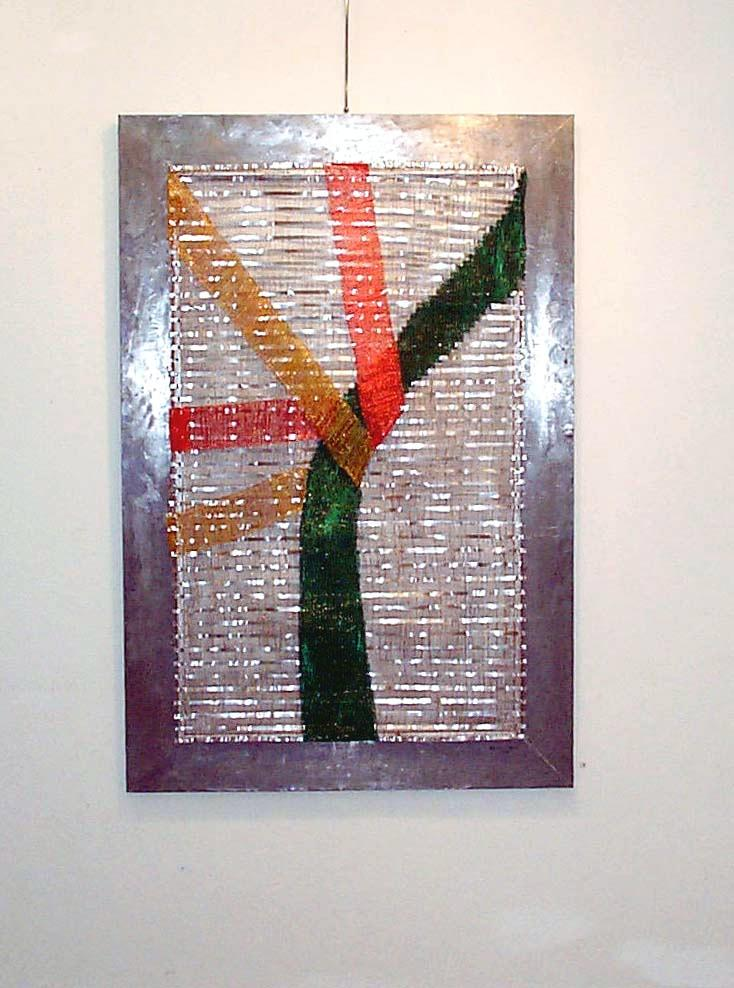
A construction of copper-fibre tapestry

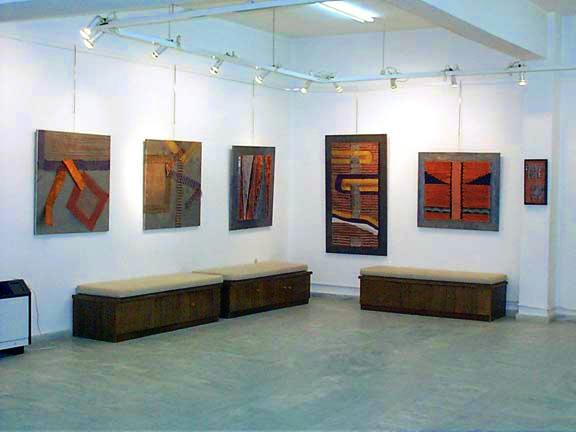
Vasso Peklariss exhibition of copper-fibre tapestry constructions

== Sources ==
- This article incorporates text from the corresponding article at the Museums of Macedonia website, commissioned by the Macedonian Heritage foundation, written by Vlasis Vlasidis, and published under a CC-BY-SA-3.0 license.
