= Chrysopetra =

Chrysopetra Χρυσόπετρα
- Community
- Location within Greece
- Coordinates: 40°59′N 22°52′E
- Country: Greece
- Administrative region: Central Macedonia
- Regional unit: Kilkis
- Municipality: Kilkis
- Municipal unit: Gallikos
- Elevation: 100 m (330 ft)

Population (2021)
  - Community: 467
- Time zone: UTC+2 (EET)
  - Summer (DST): UTC+3 (EEST)
- Postal code: 611 00
- Area code: 23410
- Vehicle registration: NI, ΚΙ*

Chrysopetra (Greek: Xρυσόπετρα, meaning "golden rock") is a village and a community south of the city of Kilkis in the Kilkis regional unit, Greece. Chrysopetra is part of the municipal unit Gallikos and has a population of 57 people (2021). The community Chrysopetra (pop. 467 in 2021) consists of the villages Chrysopetra, Fanari, Laodikino, Peristeri and Pyrgotos.
