= Perinthos, Kilkis =

Perinthos Πέρινθος
- Settlement
- Location within Greece
- Coordinates: 40°59′N 22°52′E
- Country: Greece
- Administrative region: Central Macedonia
- Regional unit: Kilkis
- Municipality: Kilkis
- Municipal unit: Gallikos
- Community: Pedino
- Elevation: 100 m (330 ft)

Population (2021)
  - Total: 24
- Time zone: UTC+2 (EET)
  - Summer (DST): UTC+3 (EEST)
- Postal code: 611 00
- Area code: 23410
- Vehicle registration: NI, ΚΙ*

Perinthos (Greek: Πέρινθος, old name: Greek: Καβακλή Kavakli) is a small village in the community Pedino, in the municipal unit Gallikos, Kilkis regional unit, Greece. The first residents moved there in 1923 from Asia Minor after the Asia Minor destruction in land plots that were allocated by EAP.

Most of the residents originate from the wider region of Raidestos in Eastern Thrace.

The village became the theatre of military conflict during the duration of the Greek civil war, while in the post-war season it accommodated a high of 70 families. The residents were mostly farmers and livestock dealers. The village had a small school (not working) and a church (Holly Cross church) that dates from 1939.

In the early 1950s the village depopulated rapidly due to rising unemployment and increased urbanism to Thessaloniki and other smaller cities. Eventually the village was abandoned.

However, after 15 years the first family moved back into the village and some old residents built holiday homes or took care of the older houses.

Today the village has 15-20 homes, however most residents do not live there permanently. It has a cultural association since 1991 and each year on the 13 September it celebrates its church name (Greek: πανηγύρι), as customary in Greece.
