= Koronouda =

Koronouda Κορωνούδα
- Community
- Location within Greece
- Coordinates: 40°59′N 23°00′E
- Country: Greece
- Geographic region: Macedonia
- Administrative region: Central Macedonia
- Regional unit: Kilkis
- Municipality: Kilkis
- Municipal unit: Kroussa

Population (2021)
  - Community: 83
- Time zone: UTC+2 (EET)
  - Summer (DST): UTC+3 (EEST)

Koronouda (Greek: Κορωνούδα, former name: Greek: Άρμπουρο, Arbor / Arbouro) is a small village in the Kilkis regional unit in Macedonia, Greece. Its population was 83 in 2021.
