= Alumil =

Greek aluminium company

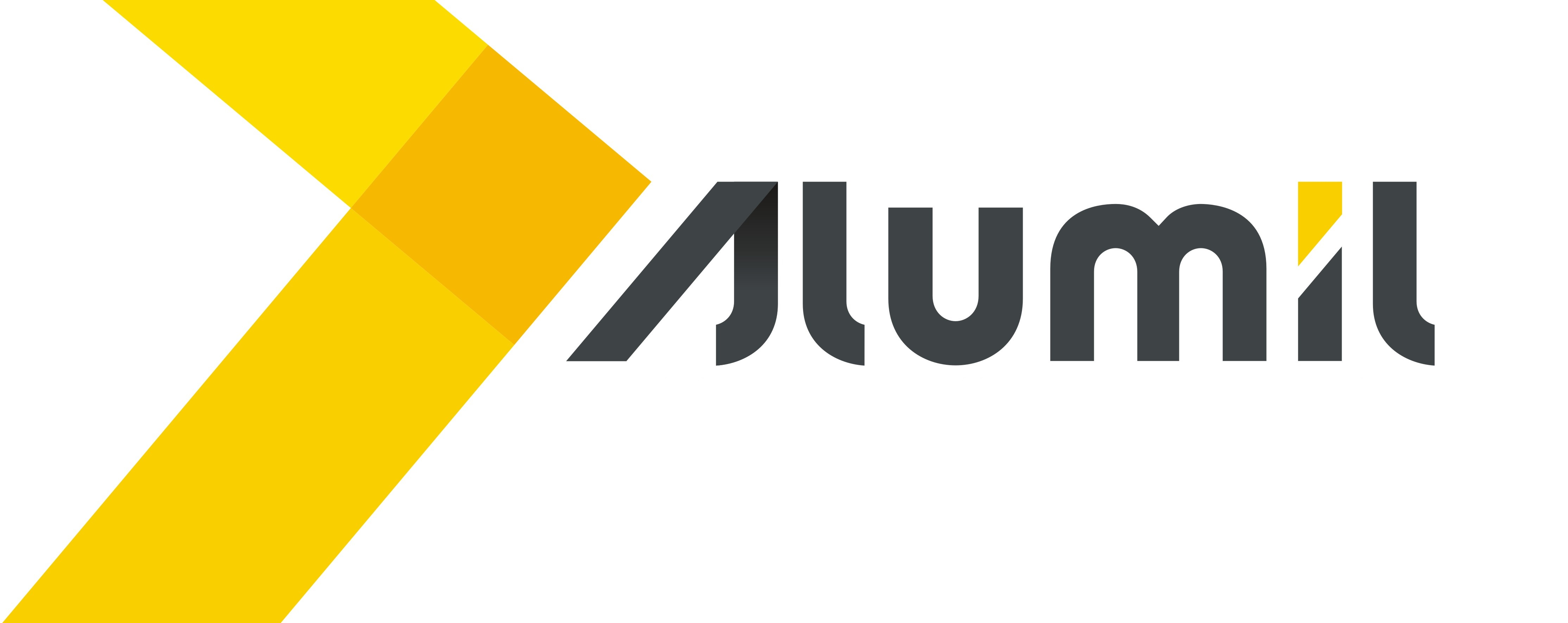
- Industry: Metals, manufacturing
- Founded: 1988
- Founder: Mylonas family
- Headquarters: Kilkis, Greece
- Products: Aluminium, Technology and R&D.
- Revenue: €402,5 million (2022)
- Operating income: €56,5 million (2022)
- Net income: €15,6 million (2022)
- Total assets: €361 million (2022)
- Website: www.alumil.com

Alumil S.A. specialized in the research, development and production of aluminium architectural systems. The company is headquartered in the Industrial Area of Stavrochori Kilkis, Greece. Alumil S.A. operates worldwide with over 30 subsidiaries.

== History ==
In 1988, the Milonas family created an industrial company for the design, production and commercialization of aluminium profiles, in the Industrial Area of Kilkis in Northern Greece. During the 90's the company presented its first systems which were produced in Italy. In the following years, it started its own vertically integrated production line, and in 1993 it founded its commercial subsidiary Alusys in Athens, as well as a Research and Development department at its facilities in Kilkis in order to design new products. Subsequently, the company expanded its operations abroad, establishing subsidiaries in Romania in 1997, Hungary, Albania and Bulgaria in 1998, Poland and Ukraine in 1999. The following years additional subsidiaries were founded, in Germany, North Macedonia and Cyprus during 2000, as well as in Serbia and Italy during 2001. Moreover, in 2001, the subsidiary Metron S.A. specialized in elevators was created through acquisition of a company which was specialized in the production of automatic doors.

In order to strengthen the Group's domestic market share, two exhibition venues in Athens and Thessaloniki have been set up and exclusive product representation with Phifer Inc., ASA and GU has been agreed. In 2004, it acquired Alpro, a Bosnian aluminum industry. In addition, the Group received significant distinctions such as Europe's GrowthPlus Top 500 award and the "Export Activity Award" of Athens Chamber of Commerce and Industry. In 2007, a subsidiary was established in the United Arab Emirates so as to enhance the company's presence at the Arabian peninsula.

In 2008 a subsidiary in the United States of America was established. During the same period, due to Greek financial crisis the Group set priority on international markets. In 2009, a Greek subsidiary, Alumil Solar was founded, a company which specialized in the design, production and commercialization of photovoltaic mounting systems. In 2010, it founded a subsidiary based in Russia. In 2014, a certification laboratory-testing centre was set up in collaboration with CFT and the ift Rosenheim Institute. Last but not least, in 2015 Alumil announced the establishment of three more subsidiaries in Australia, India and Egypt.

== Social and environmental action ==
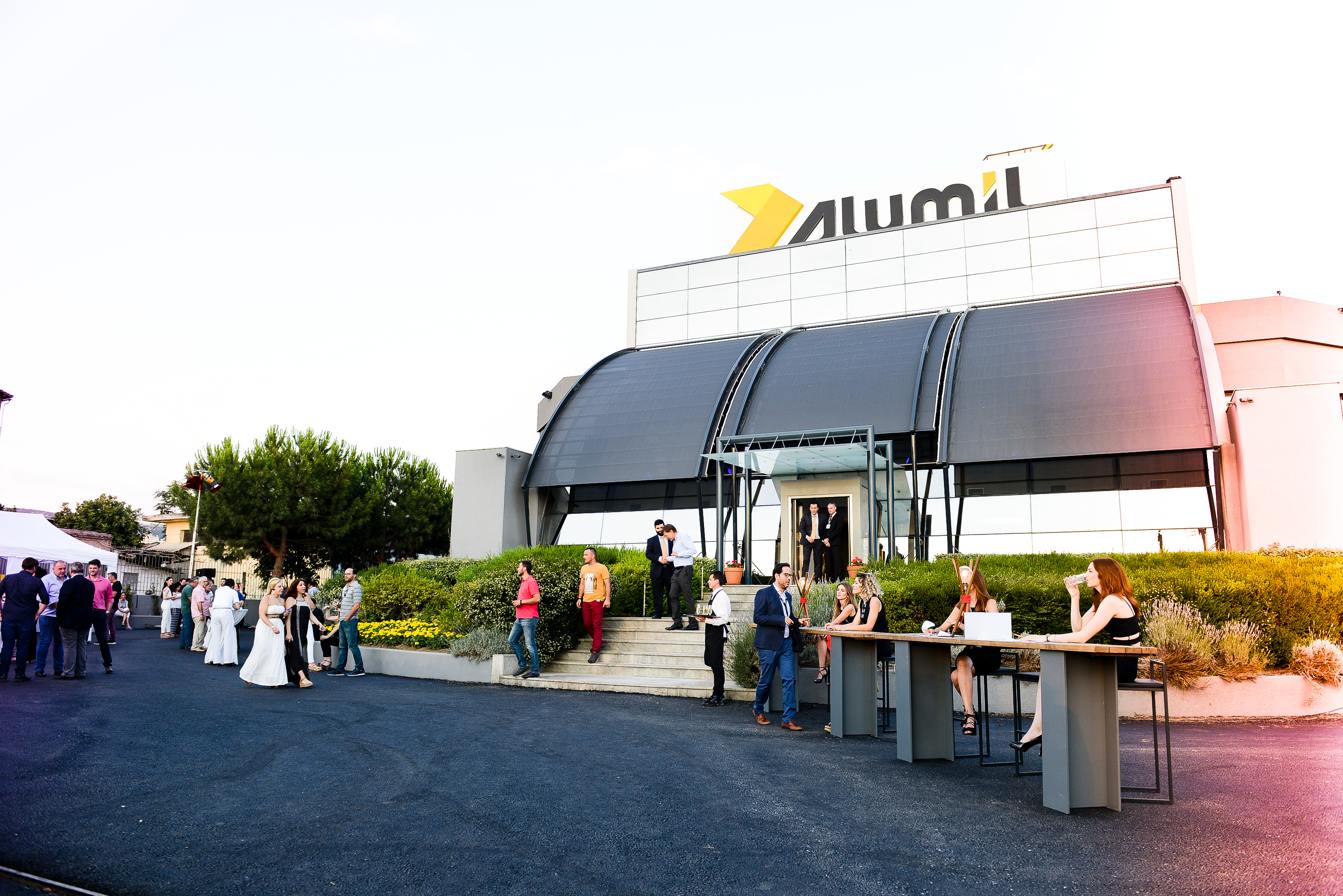
Offices in Thessaloniki

In accordance with Corporate Social Responsibility, from 2010 Alumil started implementing the environmental plan ‘'Green Alumil'’. More important was the distinction of the Group's Innovation and Contribution in Environmental Awareness, which awarded on the Eco-Business Innovation Competition during the 4th Business Forum of the 73rd Thessaloniki International Fair. Alumil is also a member of the Hellenic Network for Corporate Social Responsibility and a founding member of the United Nations Global Compact Network.

== Subsidiaries ==
In 2000 Alumil started its activity in Renewable Energy Resources by producing and placing photovoltaic mounting systems. Subsequently, Alumil Solar was established in 2009 as a subsidiary of the Alumil Group, operating as a business unit focused on solar energy solutions.

== Controversy ==
During the 2022 Russian invasion of Ukraine, Alumil refused to join the NATO community and withdraw from the Russian market. Research from Yale University published on August 10, 2022, identifying how companies were reacting to Russia's invasion identified Alumil in the worst category of "Digging in", meaning Defying Demands for Exit: companies defying demands for exit/reduction of activities.
