= Megali Vrysi, Kilkis =

Megali Vrysi Μεγάλη Βρύση
- Community
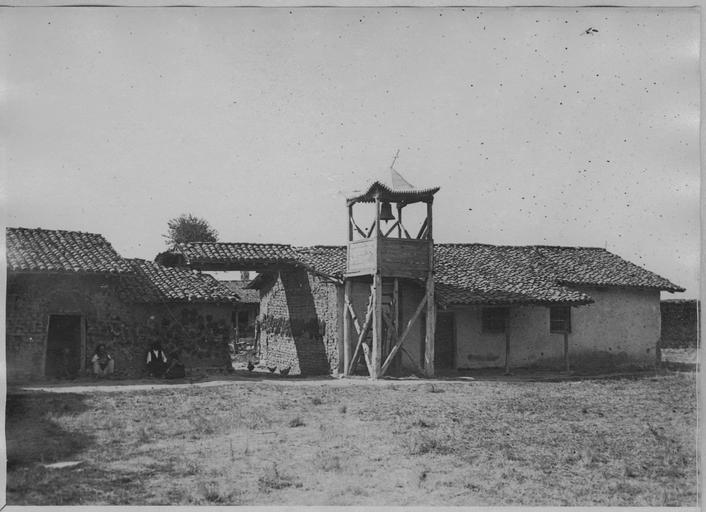
- The church photographed by the French Army in July 1916

- Location within Greece
- Coordinates: 41°00′26.67″N 22°47′41.36″E
- Country: Greece
- Administrative region: Central Macedonia
- Regional unit: Kilkis
- Municipality: Kilkis
- Municipal unit: Kilkis
- Elevation: 120 m (390 ft)

Population (2021)
  - Community: 412
- Time zone: UTC+2 (EET)
  - Summer (DST): UTC+3 (EEST)
- Postal code: 612 00
- Area code: 23430
- Vehicle registration: KI

Megali Vrysi or Megali Vrisi (Greek: Μεγάλη Βρύση, old name: Greek: Αρμουτσή Armutsi / Armoutsi) is a village in the Kilkis region of Greece. It is situated in the municipal unit of Kilkis, in the Kilkis municipality, within the Kilkis region of Central Macedonia.

== Geography ==
=== Physical Geography ===
The terrain around Megali Vrysi is mainly flat, but to the northeast it is hilly. (Note: Calculated from the variance in all elevation data (DEM 3 ") from Viewfinder Panoramas, within 10 km radius. sv:Lsjbot-algoritmnot) The highest point in the vicinity is 335 meters above sea level, 3.2 km east of Megali Vrysi. (Note: Calculated from height data (DEM 3 ") from Viewfinder Panoramas.) Around Megali Vrysi it is quite densely populated, with 58 inhabitants per square kilometre. The nearest major community is Kilkis, 6.8 km east of Megali Vrysi. The area around Megali Vrysi consists mostly of agricultural land.

The climate in the area is temperate. Average annual temperature in the neighbourhood is 16 °C. The warmest month is July, when the average temperature is 30 °C, and the coldest is December, with 2 °C. Average annual rainfall is 844 millimetres. The wettest month is February, with an average of 116 mm of precipitation, and the driest is August, with 21 mm of precipitation.

=== Administration ===
Until 1994, it was the seat of the community of Megali Vrysi, to which the neighbouring settlement of Metalliko also belonged. After the implementation of the Kapodistrias plan, it joined the municipality of Kilkis. According to the Kallikratis plan, it is the local community of Megali Vrysi that belongs to the municipal unit of Kilkis of the municipality of Kilkis and according to the 2021 census has a population of 412 permanent residents.

== History ==
=== In the Ottoman Empire ===
The " Ethnography vilayets of Adrianople, Monastir and Salonika ", published in Constantinople in 1878 and reflects the statistics of the male population by 1873, Armutliya ( Armoutlia ) is listed as a village in Hisar said Aurelia with 40 houses and 105 inhabitants Pomaks. According to Vasil Kanchov (" Macedonia. Ethnography and Statistics "), in 1900 Ali Hadjalar had 350 Bulgarian Christians and 20 Gypsies.

=== In Greece ===
After the Second Balkan War, Armutchi was under Greek sovereignty. This area of the Macedonian front was the scene of fighting between the Bulgarians and the Entente forces dominated by the Armée d'Orient (1915–1919). A number of photos from this time have survived. In 1927 the village was renamed Megali Vrisi. Its inhabitants emigrated and were replaced by Greek refugees. In 1928, Armutchi was presented as a purely refugee village with 121 refugee families and 451 people.

== Notes ==
Notes
