= Gallikos Kilkis =

Gallikos Γαλλικός
- Community
- Location within Greece
- Coordinates: 40°59′N 22°52′E
- Country: Greece
- Administrative region: Central Macedonia
- Regional unit: Kilkis
- Municipality: Kilkis
- Municipal unit: Gallikos
- Elevation: 100 m (330 ft)

Population (2021)
  - Community: 794
- Time zone: UTC+2 (EET)
  - Summer (DST): UTC+3 (EEST)
- Postal code: 611 00
- Area code: 23410
- Vehicle registration: NI, ΚΙ*

Gallikos (Greek: Γαλλικός Κιλκίς, Bulgarian: Саламаново) is a village south of the city of Kilkis in the Kilkis regional unit, Greece. It is part of the municipal unit Gallikos and has a population of 794 people (2021).
