= Vaptistis =

Village in Greece

Vaptistis Βαπτιστής
- Community
- Location within Greece
- Coordinates: 40°59′31″N 22°46′19″E
- Country: Greece
- Administrative region: Central Macedonia
- Regional unit: Kilkis
- Municipality: Kilkis
- Municipal unit: Kilkis

Population (2021)
  - Community: 318
- Time zone: UTC+2 (EET)
  - Summer (DST): UTC+3 (EEST)

Vaptistis (Greek: Βαπτιστής "Baptist") is a village and a community in the municipality of Kilkis, Kilkis regional unit of Greece. In 2021 its population was 318 for the community, which includes the village Kyriakaiika. It is situated 9 km west of Kilkis, 17 km east of Polykastro and 42 km north of Thessaloniki. The village has a primary school, a high school, a stadium and three churches. The protector saint is St. John the Baptist, and the village is named after him. There are an athletic club "A.C. Doxa Vaptisti" and a cultural one "Politistikos Syllogos Vaptisti".

== Name ==
During the Ottoman period, the village was known as Haydarlı (Greek: Χαϊνταρλί).

== Population ==
Before 1922, the village was inhabited by Turks and its name was Haydarlı (Aydarlı). Following the population exchange between Greece and Turkey, Greeks from Eastern Thrace moved into Haydarlı. Turks followed the same route but towards the opposite direction.
