= Eiriniko =

Eiriniko Ειρηνικό
- Community
- Location within Greece
- Coordinates: 41°8′13″N 22°40′7″E
- Country: Greece
- Administrative region: Central Macedonia
- Regional unit: Kilkis
- Municipality: Paionia
- Municipal unit: Polykastro
- Elevation: 216 m (709 ft)

Population (2021)
  - Community: 42
- Time zone: UTC+2 (EET)
  - Summer (DST): UTC+3 (EEST)
- Postal code: 612 00
- Area code: 23430
- Vehicle registration: KI

Eiriniko (Greek: Ειρηνικό) is a village in Kilkis regional unit of Central Macedonia, Greece. It is situated in the municipal unit of Polykastro, in the Paionia municipality, within the Kilkis region of Central Macedonia.

In the 19th century the village was part of the Gevgelija kaza, the first south of the Turkish villages in Tarnova. The name in Turkish given to the village was 'Kolibalar, (Greek: Καλύβια Γιαννελλαίων, Kalivia Giannelaion).

The current name, adopted in 1954, which translates from Greek as "peaceful" or "pacific", comes from the First World War, where fierce battles were fought between the allies (under French command) and the Central Powers. The name " Pacific" was given to embellish the horror of the military operations of that time.
