= Korona, Kilkis =

Korona Κορώνα
- Community
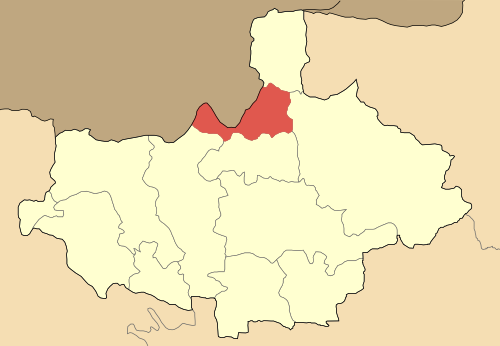
- Location within the regional unit

- Location within Greece
- Coordinates: 41°09′51″N 22°40′08″E
- Country: Greece
- Administrative region: Central Macedonia
- Regional unit: Kilkis
- Municipality: Paionia
- Municipal unit: Polykastro
- Elevation: 17 m (56 ft)

Population (2021)
  - Community: 38
- Time zone: UTC+2 (EET)
  - Summer (DST): UTC+3 (EEST)
- Postal code: 612 00
- Area code: 23430
- Vehicle registration: KI

Korona (Greek: Κορώνα) is a village in Kilkis regional unit of Central Macedonia, Greece. It is situated in the municipal unit of Polykastro, in the Paionia municipality, within the Kilkis region of Central Macedonia. According to the 2021 census it has a population of 38 permanent residents.

The old name of the village was Krastali (Greek: Κράσταλη), until it changed to its current name in 1926.

In the early twentieth century Krastali was a Turkish village in the Gevgelija said of the Ottoman Empire. After the Second Balkan War in 1913 the village was under Greek sovereignty. Its population emigrated to Turkey and was replaced by Greek refugees who resettled there. In 1928 the village was entirely refugee with 32 families and 91 refugees.

The village is situated at the foot of the ominous hill (altitude 665 m.), the top of which is the border between Greece and North Macedonia. The name of the hill is due to the First World War, when the French named the hill (French: Grand Couronne). This translates as - Greek: Μεγάλη κορώνα - hence the new name of the village.
