= Drosato, Kilkis =

Drosato Δροσάτο
- Community
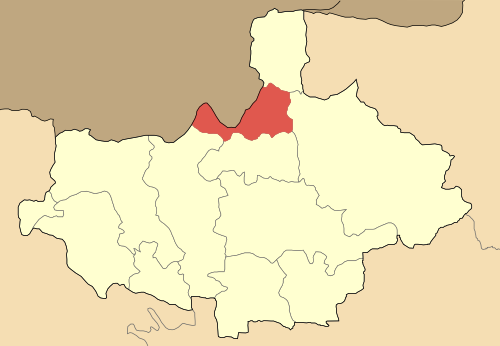
- Location within the regional unit

- Location within Greece
- Coordinates: 41°10′N 22°48′E
- Country: Greece
- Administrative region: Central Macedonia
- Regional unit: Kilkis
- Municipality: Kilkis
- Municipal unit: Doirani

Population (2021)
  - Community: 647
- Time zone: UTC+2 (EET)
  - Summer (DST): UTC+3 (EEST)
- Vehicle registration: ΚΙ

Drosato (Greek: Δροσάτο, Bulgarian: Патарос) is a village and a community in the Kilkis regional unit, northern Greece. Drosato was the seat of the former municipality of Doirani. The community Drosato consists of the villages Drosato, Doirani and Koryfi.

== Geography ==
Drosato is located 4 km southeast of Lake Doirani, 4 km from the border with the Republic of North Macedonia and 20 km north of Kilkis. The Greek National Road 65 (Kilkis–Sidirokastro) passes by the village. There are low hills to the east.

== Population ==
Year	Village population	Community population
1991	864	-
2001	1,068	1,392
2011	713	902
2021	523	647

== See also ==
- List of settlements in the Kilkis regional unit
