= Plagia, Paionia =

Plagia Πλαγιά
- Community
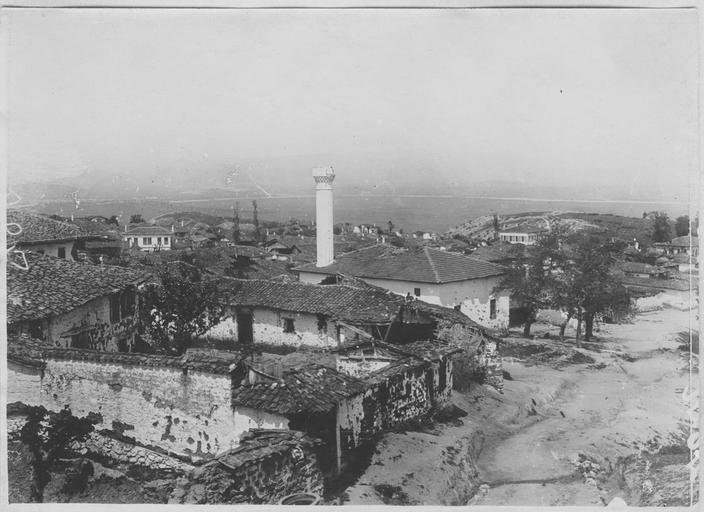
- Panorama from the village photographed by the French Army in May 1917

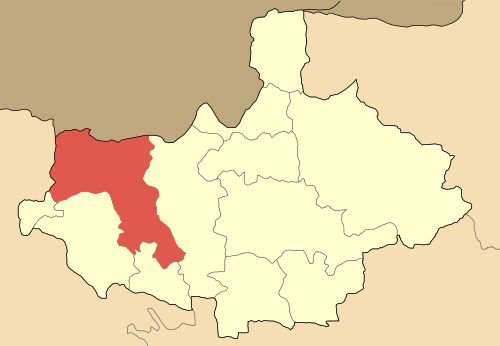
- Location within the regional unit

- Location within Greece
- Coordinates: 41°04′49.64″N 22°29′48.71″E
- Country: Greece
- Administrative region: Central Macedonia
- Regional unit: Kilkis
- Municipality: Paeonia
- Municipal unit: Axioupolis
- Elevation: 280 m (920 ft)

Population (2021)
  - Community: 179
- Time zone: UTC+2 (EET)
  - Summer (DST): UTC+3 (EEST)
- Postal code: 61 400
- Vehicle registration: KI

Plagia (Greek: Πλαγιά, before 1928: Greek: Καρασινάν Karasinan) is a village in the Kilkis regional unit of Greece. It is situated in the municipal unit of Axioupoli, in the Paionia municipality, within the Kilkis region of Central Macedonia.

The terrain around Plagia is hilly to the southwest, but to the northeast it is flat. (Note: Calculated from the variance in all elevation data (DEM 3 ") from Viewfinder Panoramas, within 10 km radius. sv:Lsjbot-algoritmnot) The highest point nearby is 1,627 metres above sea level, 14.5 km southwest of Plagia. (Note: Calculated from height data (DEM 3 ") from Viewfinder Panoramas.) Around Plagia it is quite sparsely populated, with 38 inhabitants per square kilometre. The nearest major community is Axioupoli, 11.2 km south of Plagia. In the surroundings around Plagia, mainly sparse and often low-growing subtropical forest grows. (Note: A somewhat free interpretation of the source indicating Woody Savannas)

The climate in the area is temperate. Average annual temperature in the neighbourhood is 15 °C . The warmest month is July, when the average temperature is 28 °C, and the coldest is January, with 3 °C. Average annual rainfall is 984 millimetres. The wettest month is February, with an average of 137 mm of precipitation, and the driest is August, with 32 mm of precipitation.

== Notes and citations ==
Notes

Citations
