= Terpyllus =

Terpyllus or Terpyllos (Ancient Greek: Τέρπνλλος) was a town of Mygdonia in ancient Macedonia. The name has also come down to us in the form of Trepillus.

The site of Terpyllus is unlocated, although a village in the former municipality of Kroussa has revived the name.
