= Neo Gynaikokastro =

Neo Gynaikokastro Νέο Γυναικόκαστρο
- Community
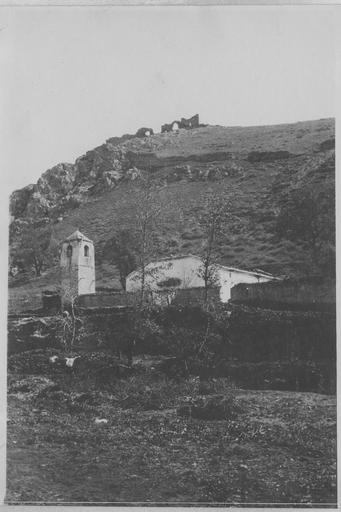
- The church photographed by the French Army in June 1916

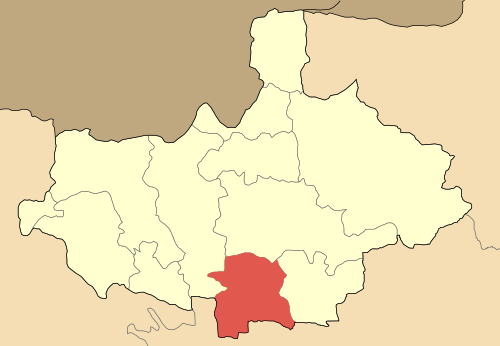
- Location within the regional unit

- Location within Greece
- Coordinates: 40°55′16.47″N 22°44′48.4″E
- Country: Greece
- Administrative region: Central Macedonia
- Regional unit: Kilkis
- Municipality: Kilkis (municipality)
- Municipal unit: Pikrolimni
- Elevation: 75 m (246 ft)

Population (2021)
  - Community: 751
- Time zone: UTC+2 (EET)
  - Summer (DST): UTC+3 (EEST)
- Postal code: 612 00
- Area code: 23430
- Vehicle registration: KI

Neo Gynaikokastro (Greek: Νέο Γυναικόκαστρο, old name: Avret Hisar) is a village in the Kilkis region of Greece. It is situated in the municipal unit of Pikrolimni, in the Kilkis municipality, within the Kilkis region of Central Macedonia.

== Geography ==
The terrain around Neo Gynaikokastro is a bit hilly. (Note: Calculated from the variance in all elevation data (DEM 3 ") from Viewfinder Panoramas, within 10 km radius. sv:Lsjbot-algoritmnot) The highest point in the vicinity is 188 metres above sea level, 1.6 km north of Neo Gynaikokastro. (Note: Calculated from height data (DEM 3 ") from Viewfinder Panoramas.) Around Neo Gynaikokastro it is quite sparsely populated, with 42 inhabitants per square kilometre. The nearest major community is Kilkis, 13.3 km northeast of Neo Gynaikokastro. The area around Neo Gynaikokastro consists mostly of agricultural land.

The climate in the area is humid and subtropical. The average annual temperature in the neighbourhood is 17 °C. The warmest month is August, when the average temperature is 30 °C, and the coldest is December, with 3 °C. Average annual rainfall is 844 millimetres. The wettest month is February, with an average of 116 mm of precipitation, and the driest is August, with 21 mm of precipitation.

== History ==
=== Byzantine Era ===
The wider area of Gynaikokastro was initially part of ancient Mygdonia and then, during the reign of Alcetas I of Macedon (658-540) and Amyntas I of Macedon (540-498). In 1334 a castle was built in the area by Andronikos III Palaiologos to protect, mainly from the Serbs, Thessaloniki and to protect the crop of the Macedonian plain.

=== Ottoman Rule ===
Around 1383, it was occupied by the Ottoman Turks under the leadership of Gazi Evrenos Bey, hence the old name of the village was Avret Hisar or Avret Isar. During the years of Ottoman rule there was the kaza of Avret Hisar that belonged to the Salonica Vilayet.

=== Greek Rule ===
The village was transferred to Greek sovereignty as a result of the Second Balkan War. This area of the Macedonian front was the scene of fighting between the Bulgarians and the Entente forces dominated by the Armée d'Orient (1915–1919). A number of photos from this time have survived.

Its current inhabitants are descended from Greek refugees who came from the "Tsataltza" province of Istanbul and the "Artohan" region of the Caucasus. In 1926, refugees from Eastern Thrace settled, namely from the villages of Oklali, Lazarkioi, Ambarli and Akala in the area of Metron (Tsataltzas), near Lake Derko and the village was renamed Nea Dimitra. In 1928 the name was corrected to Neo Gynaikokastro. In 1928 the village was entirely populated with resettled refugees, comprising 608 people in total within 178 families.

According to the Kallikratis plan, the village, along with Vakoufi, Kokartza and Kato Apostoloi, constitute the local community of Neo Gynaikokastro, which belongs to the municipal unit of Pikrolimni of the municipality of Kilkis. According to the 2021 census the community has a population of 751 inhabitants.

In 1994, the hill northwest of the village was declared a protected archaeological site.

== Notes ==
Notes
