= Kroussa =

Kroussa Κρούσσα
- Municipal unit
- Location within the regional unit

- Location within Greece
- Coordinates: 41°02′N 22°56′E
- Country: Greece
- Administrative region: Central Macedonia
- Regional unit: Kilkis
- Municipality: Kilkis

Area
  - Municipal unit: 588.9 km^{2} (227.4 sq mi)

Population (2021)
  - Municipal unit: 3,666
  - Municipal unit density: 6.225/km^{2} (16.12/sq mi)
- Time zone: UTC+2 (EET)
  - Summer (DST): UTC+3 (EEST)
- Vehicle registration: ΚΙ

Kroussa or Kroussia (Greek: Κρούσσα or Κρούσσια; Bulgarian and Macedonian Slavic: Круша Krusha, meaning "pear") is a former municipality in Kilkis regional unit, Greece. Since the 2011 local government reform it is part of the municipality Kilkis, of which it is a municipal unit. It is located in the northeastern corner of the regional unit, bordering western Serres and northern Thessaloniki. The municipal unit has an area of 588.877 km^{2}. Its population is 3,666 (2021 census). The seat of the municipality was in Terpyllos (pop. 613). Melissourgio is one of the most picturesque villages in the municipal unit. Agios Antonios is one of the villages nearby. The largest communities in the municipal unit are Térpyllos, Efkarpía (pop. 415), Eptálofos (324), Váthi (269) and Ísoma (258). The municipal unit is divided into 19 communities. In Palatiano, there is the most important archaeological site of Northern Greece. It was the ancient city of Ioron, flourished from 10th century BC to 3rd century AD, continuously.

In the Macedonian Struggle, people of Kroussa villages fought in order to free their lands from Turkish and Bulgarians. Some of the Macedonian Fighters are:

- Ioannis Villioglou "Kapetan Ramnalis", Issoma, (1885–1923)
- father Dimitrios Papadimitriou, Issoma
- Nikolaos Kapoulas, Koronouda
