= Pontoirakleia =

Village in Central Macedonia, Greece

Pontoirakleia Ποντοηράκλεια
- Community
- Location within Greece
- Coordinates: 41°6′15″N 22°37′22″E
- Country: Greece
- Administrative region: Central Macedonia
- Regional unit: Kilkis
- Municipality: Paionia
- Municipal unit: Polykastro

Population (2021)
  - Community: 527
- Time zone: UTC+2 (EET)
  - Summer (DST): UTC+3 (EEST)
- Postal code: 612 00
- Area code: 23430
- Vehicle registration: KI

Pontoirakleia (Greek: Ποντοηράκλεια, old name: Greek: Ερεσελή Ereseli / Reseli) is a village in Kilkis regional unit of Central Macedonia, Greece. Since the 2011 local government reform it is part of the municipality of Paionia. Its population consists almost entirely of Greeks of Pontian descent.
