= Nea Santa =

Town in Central Macedonia, Greece

Nea Santa Νέα Σάντα
- Community
- Location within Greece
- Coordinates: 40°50′N 22°55′E
- Country: Greece
- Administrative region: Central Macedonia
- Regional unit: Kilkis
- Municipality: Kilkis
- Municipal unit: Gallikos
- Elevation: 100 m (330 ft)
- Highest elevation: 534 m (1,752 ft)
- Lowest elevation: 23 m (75 ft)

Population (2021)
  - Community: 1,582
- Time zone: UTC+2 (EET)
  - Summer (DST): UTC+3 (EEST)
- Postal code: 611 00
- Area code: 23410
- Vehicle registration: NI, ΚΙ*
- Website: www.neasanta.gr

Nea Santa (Greek: Νέα Σάντα, old name Volovot until 1926), is a small town in Kilkis regional unit, in the Central Macedonia region of Greece. The community Nea Santa (pop. 1,582 in 2021) consists of the villages Nea Santa and Panteleimon. Nea Santa is south of the city of Kilkis in the Kilkis municipality.

The town was re-settled by Greek refugees from the Pontus in the 1920s, and was named after the Santa region of the Pontus (now Dumanlı).

Nea Santa is close to a small industrial area providing home to few companies in the areas of textiles, plastics, processed food and industrial machinery.

The 71st Airmobile Brigade "Pontos" is also located there.
