= Kilkis =

City in Macedonia, Greece

Kilkis Κιλκίς
- Municipality
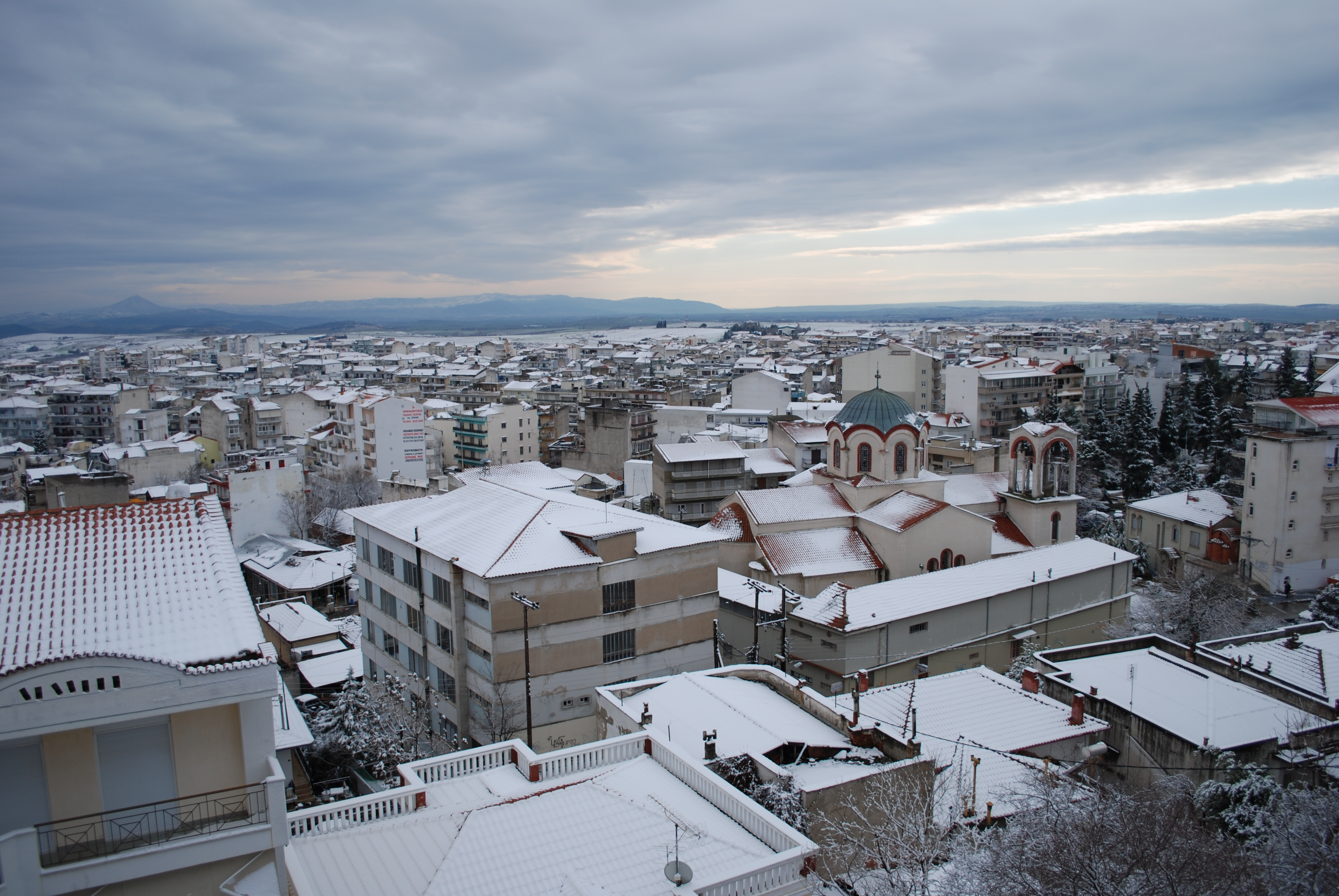
- The town in winter

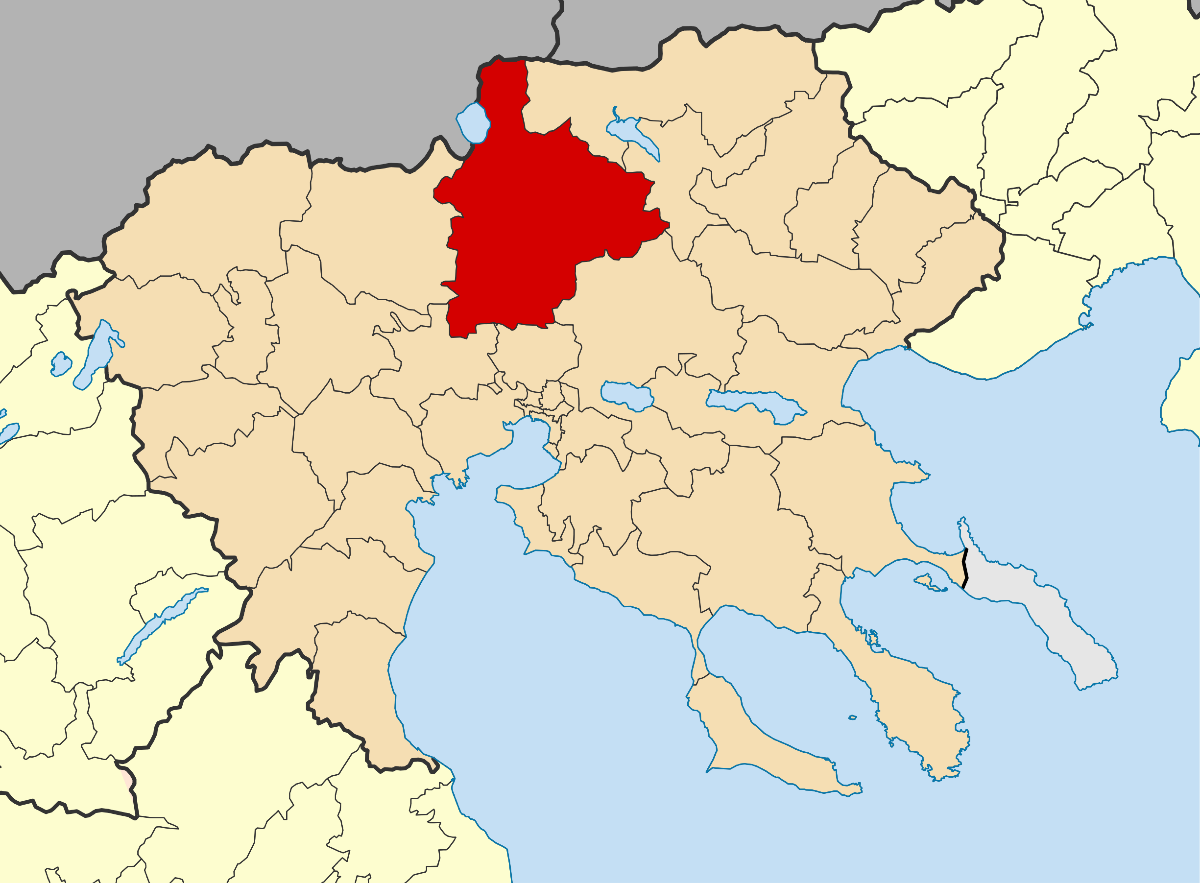

- Location within Greece
- Coordinates: 40°59′37″N 22°52′30″E
- Country: Greece
- Administrative region: Central Macedonia
- Regional unit: Kilkis

Government
  - Mayor: Dimitrios Kyriakidis (since 2019)

Area
  - Municipality: 1,599.6 km^{2} (617.6 sq mi)
  - Municipal unit: 319.8 km^{2} (123.5 sq mi)
- Elevation: 280 m (920 ft)

Population (2021)
  - Municipality: 45,308
  - Density: 28.325/km^{2} (73.360/sq mi)
  - Municipal unit: 27,493
  - Municipal unit density: 85.97/km^{2} (222.7/sq mi)
  - Community: 24,130
- Time zone: UTC+2 (EET)
  - Summer (DST): UTC+3 (EEST)
- Postal code: 611 00
- Area code: 23410
- Vehicle registration: NI, ΚΙ*
- Website: www.e-kilkis.gr

Kilkis is a city in Central Macedonia, Greece. As of 2021, there were 24,130 people living in the city proper, 27,493 people living in the municipal unit, and 45,308 in the municipality of Kilkis. It is also the capital city of the regional unit of Kilkis.

The area of Kilkis, during the 20th century, became several times a war theatre; during the Macedonian Struggle, the Balkan Wars, World War I, World War II, the Greek Resistance and the Greek Civil War.

== Name ==
Kilkis is located in a region that was multi-ethnic in the recent past and is known by several different names. The name of the city in Roman and early Byzantine times was Callicum or Callicus (Greek: Καλλικών, Καλλικώς), which is also the source of the name of the river Gallikos. Later it was known as Kalkis or Kilkis. In Bulgarian and Macedonian, it is known as Kukush (Кукуш). In a Greek church Codеx of 1732 it is mentioned as Kilkisi (Κηλκήση), while in a Slavic church Codеx from 1741 it is mentioned as Kukush (Кукуш, Кукоуш). The Ottomans called it Kılkış (written قلقيش in Ottoman Turkish).

== Administration ==
=== Municipality ===
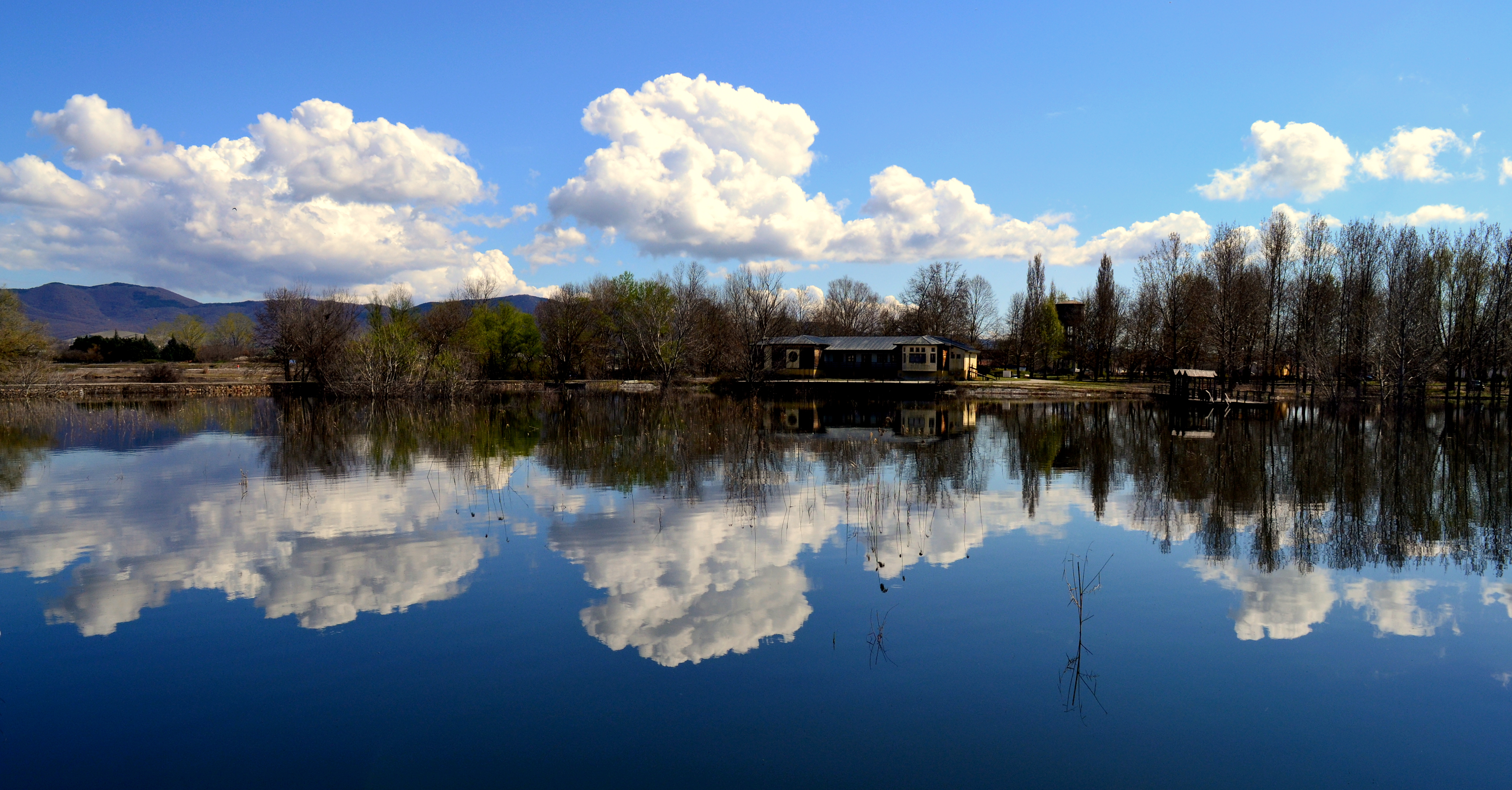
Lake Doirani near the town

The municipality Kilkis was formed at the 2011 local government reform by the merger of the following 7 former municipalities, that became municipal units:

- Cherso
- Doirani
- Gallikos
- Kilkis
- Kroussa
- Mouries
- Pikrolimni

The municipality has an area of 1,599.604 km^{2}, the municipal unit 319.834 km^{2}.

=== Communities ===
The municipal unit Kilkis consists of the following communities (settlements):

- Kilkis (Kilkis, Argyroupoli, Zacharato, Kolchida, Metalliko, Xirovrysi, Sevasto)
- Chorygi
- Efkarpia
- Kastanies
- Κρηστώνη
- Leipsydrio (Leipsydrio, Akropotamia, Ano Potamia, Kato Potamia)
- Megali Vrysi
- Melanthio
- Messiano (Mesiano, Dafnochori, Leventochori, Palaio Gynaikokastro)
- Stavrochori
- Vaptistis (Vaptistis, Kyriakaiika)

=== Province ===
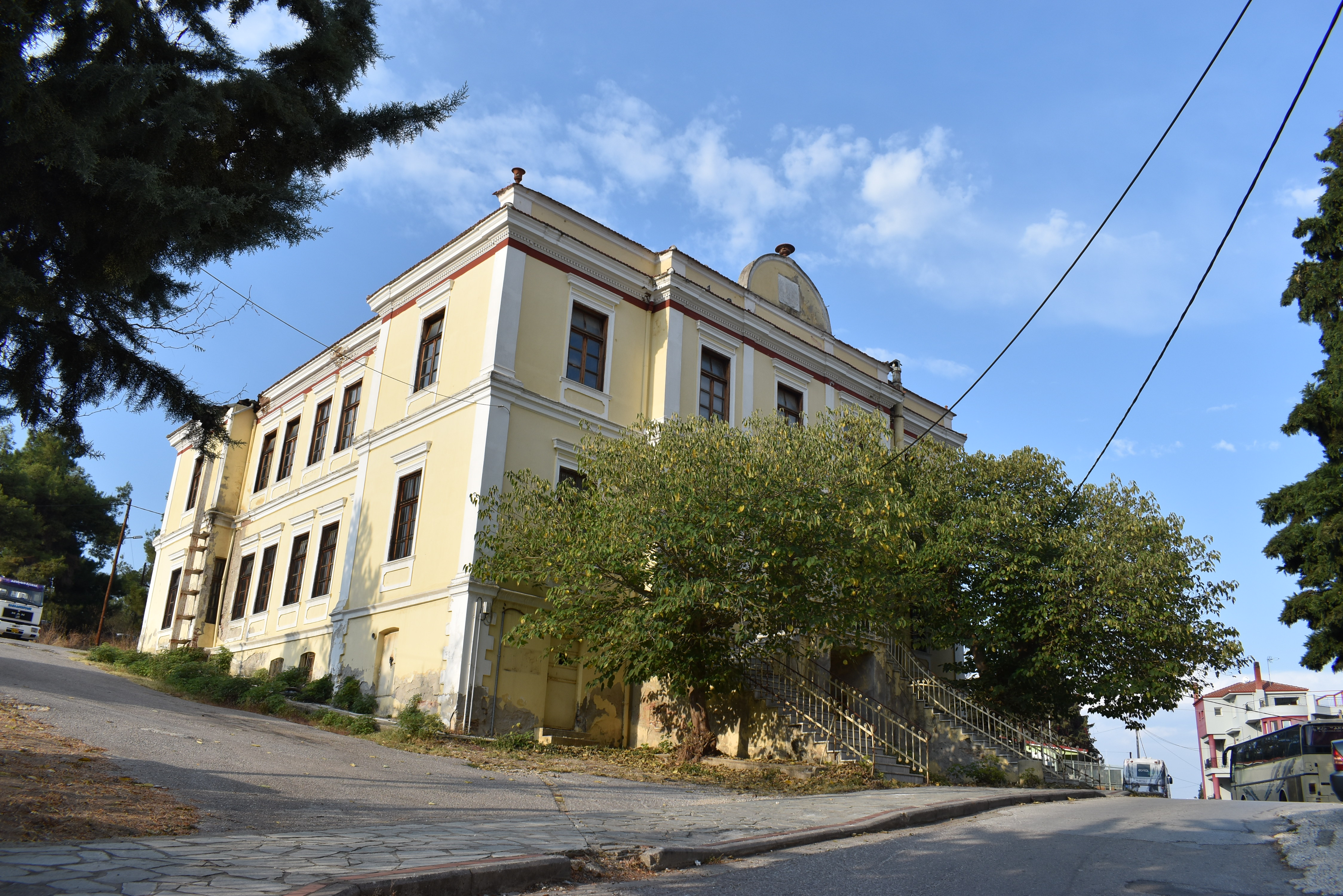
Building of the Old Prefecture of Kilkis

The province of Kilkis (Greek: Επαρχία Κιλκίς) was one of the provinces of the Kilkis Prefecture. Its territory corresponded with that of the current municipality Kilkis, and the municipal unit Polykastro. It was abolished in 2006.

== History ==
=== Ancient period ===
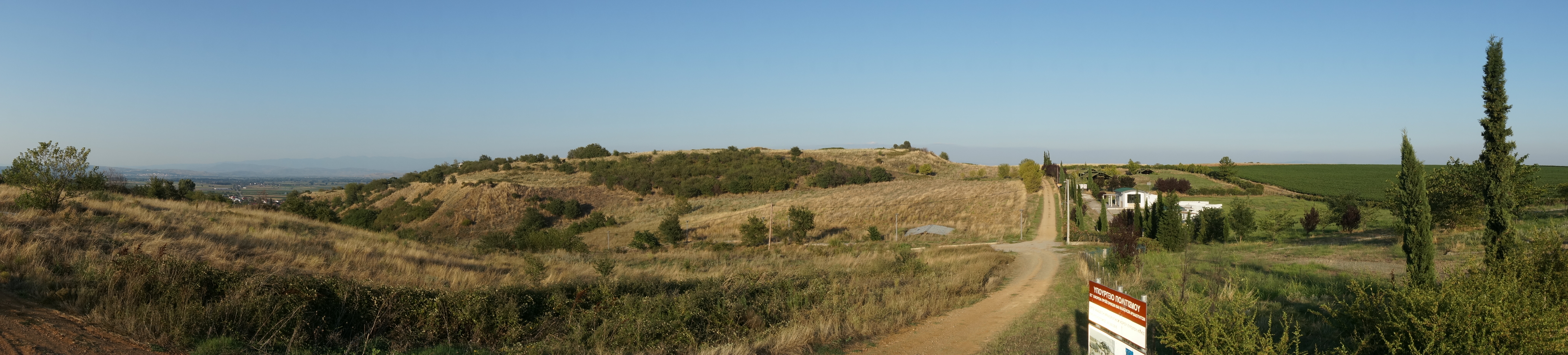
The archaeological site of Evropos

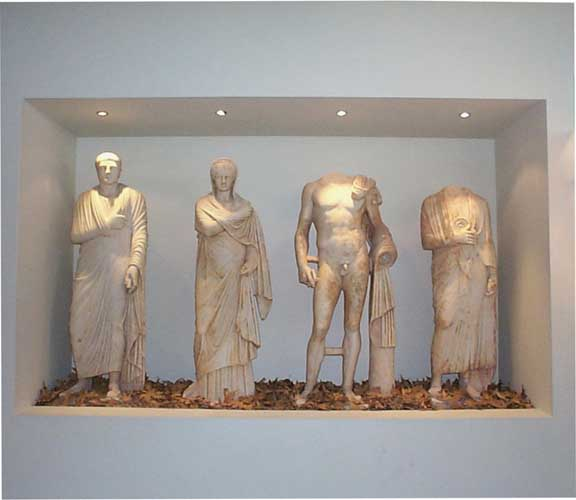
Exhibits at the Archaeological Museum of Kilkis

Findings dating back to as early as the Bronze and Iron Age have been excavated in the vicinity of Kilkis, including ancient tombs of the 2nd millennium BC. In classical antiquity, the wider region of Kilkis was ruled by the kingdom of Macedon. At the time, Kilkis was in the center of a region called Crestonia. When Philip II of Macedon visited Crestonia, the locals offered him olives from Crestonia valley, something that he had never eaten before. At that time, many towns flourished in the region, such as Idomene, Atalanta (modern Axioupoli), Gortynia (modern Gorgopi), Planitsa (modern Fyska), Terpillos, Clitae (modern Xylokeratia), Vragylos (modern Metalliko), Ioron (modern Palatiano), Chaetae (modern Tsaousitsa), Carabia (modern Limnotopos), Baerus (modern Kastro), Moryllus (modern Ano Apostoli), Domeros (modern Doirani), Europus (modern Evropos) and Kalindria.

=== Roman and Byzantine era ===
In 148 BC, the Romans took over the area. In late antiquity the area of Kilkis saw invasions of different tribes, such as the Goths, the Huns, the Avars and the Slavs, some of whom gradually settled in the Balkan Peninsula.

In the Middle Ages, Kilkis changed hands several times between the Byzantine and Bulgarian Empires. In the 10th century, it was sacked by the Bulgarians, and some of the inhabitants moved to Calabria, in southern Italy, where they founded the village of Gallicianò. During the reign of the Palaeologus dynasty, the region saw the completion of a number of important infrastructure works.

=== Ottoman rule ===
In 1430 the area came under Ottoman rule. In the first half of the 18th century, Kukush (or Kukosh) was known as a village. After 1850, there was one Greek church, "Panagia tou Kilkis" (Madonna of Kilkis), at the foot of Saint George hill and one Greek school.

By the mid-19th century Kılkış became one of the centres of the Bulgarian national activism. A group of citizens in the town signed in 1859 a letter to Pope, asking to join the Roman Catholic Church under the condition it would be able to continue their Orthodox ceremonies and the Church services would be in Bulgarian. During the 1860s and 1870s it was under the jurisdiction of the Bulgarian Uniate Church. During 1890s its population switched to Bulgarian Exarchate. In 1840–1872 the Bulgarian intellectuals Dimitar Miladinov, Andronik Yosifchev, Rayko Zhinzifov and Kuzman Shapkarev were teachers in the local school. The teacher in the local school Veniamin Machukovski, advocated сх 1872 for the publication of a special "Bulgarian grammar for Macedonian dialects". He had already been using such materials in his teaching and argued that standard Bulgarian grammar was perceived by his Macedonian pupils in Kilkis as "the hardest and most senseless subject".

An 1873 Ottoman study concluded that the population of Kilkis consisted of 1,170 households, of which there were 5,235 Bulgarian inhabitants, 155 Muslims and 40 Romani people. Reports and memoranda of Greek agents described Kilkis and the surrounding rural area, deemed of paramount importance for the control of Thessaloniki, as lacking Greek or pro-Greek population, the ethnological basis of Greek claims. A Vasil Kanchov study of 1900 counted 7,000 Bulgarian and 750 Turkish inhabitants in the town. Another survey in 1905 established the presence of 9,712 Exarchists, 40 Patriarchists, 592 Uniate Christians and 16 Protestants.

In the late 19th and early 20th century, Kilkis was part of the Salonica Vilayet of the Ottoman Empire.

In 1893–1908, the Bulgarian inhabitants of the town participated in activities of the Internal Macedonian Revolutionary Organization (IMRO). The leader of IMRO Gotse Delchev was born in Kilkis (Kukush in Bulgarian).

A catalogue of Slavophone Greeks who participated in the Macedonian Struggle ("Greek armed struggle for Macedonia") during 1904–1908 lists five persons originating from Kilkis: Georgios Samaras, Ioannis Doiranlis and Petros Koukidis, who were members of armed bands, and Evangelia Traianou-Tzoukou and Ekaterini Stampouli, as "agents of third order". Great support to the Greek efforts was given by the Chatziapostolou family. The Chatziapostolou family owned a great farm in Metalliko, the field crop of which was almost completely given to fund the Greek efforts. The farm also served a shelter for the Greek fighters.

=== Balkan Wars, WWI and later ===
Kilkis before the Second Balkan War.

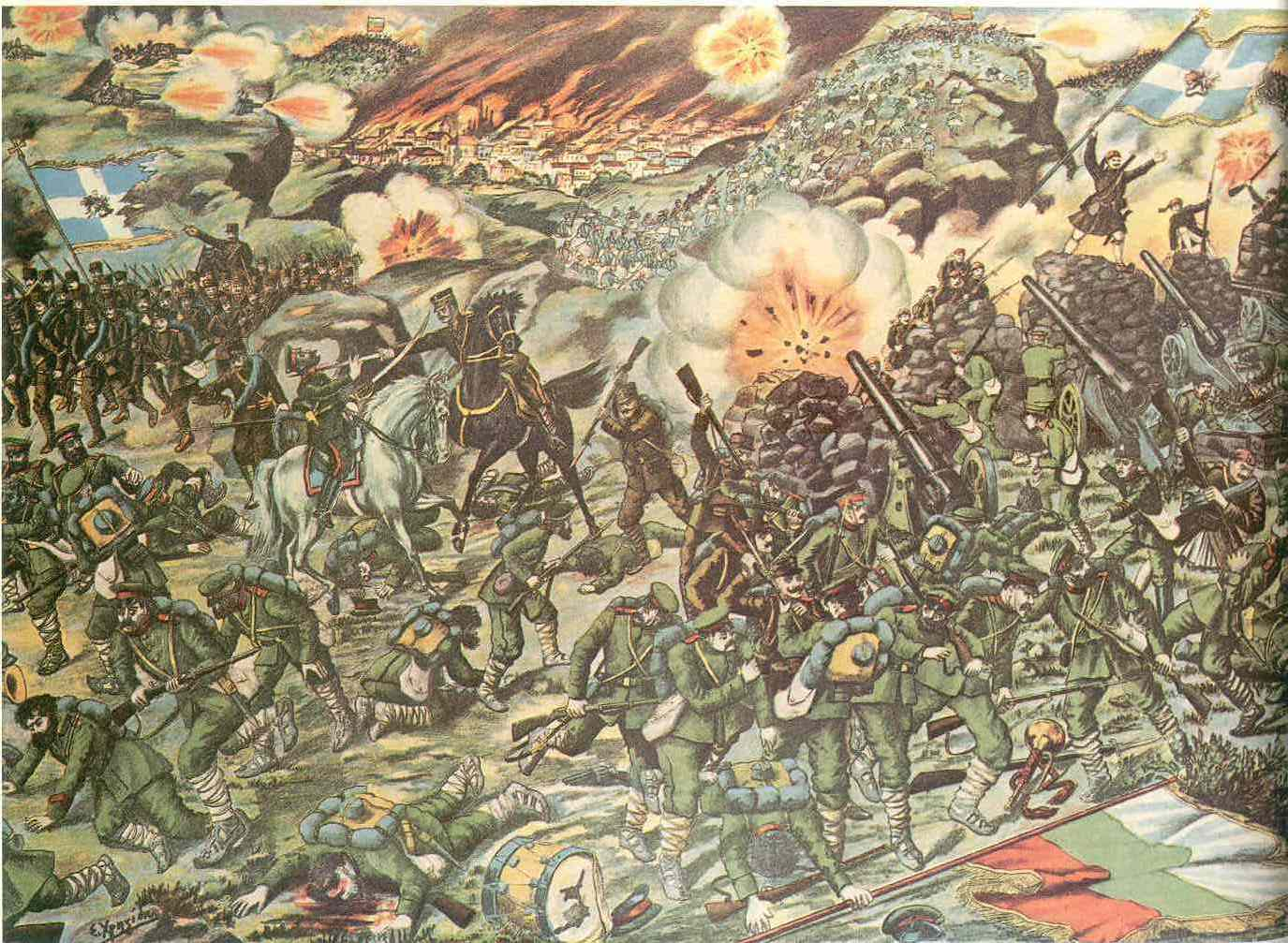
Lithography of the Battle of Kilkis (Second Balkan War), 1913.

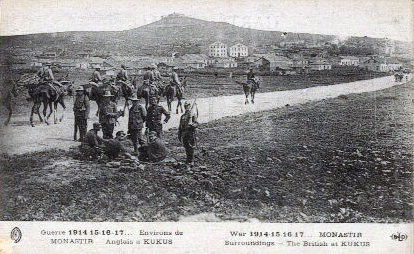
British soldiers in Kilkis, WWI

During the First Balkan War of 1912, the Ottoman Empire was defeated by the Balkan League and forced to concede almost all of its European territories, leaving Kilkis within the new boundaries of Bulgaria. In the Second Balkan War of 1913, the Greek army captured the city from the Bulgarians after the three-day Battle of Kilkis-Lahanas between 19 and 21 June. The battle was costly, with over 8,652 casualties on the Greek side and 7,000 on the Bulgarian side. The significance of the Battle of Kilkis-Lahanas can be appreciated by the fact that Greece named a battleship after the city, the Kilkís. Kilkis was set on fire and almost completely destroyed by the Greek Army after the battle and virtually all of its 13,000 pre-war Bulgarian inhabitants were expelled to Bulgaria. The new town was built closer to the railway tracks to Thessaloniki, around the Greek church of St. George, and was settled by Greeks who were expelled from the Ottoman Empire and Bulgaria, especially from Strumica; they built the Church of the Pentekaídeka Martýrōn ("15 Martyrs", named after the main Patriarchal church in Strumica). The resettled Greeks were so many (roughly 30000 refugees came from the Strumica area) that Kilkis was temporarily renamed Néa Stromnítsa (New Strumica).

During WWI, the area of Kilkis was again inside the war zone, as part of the Macedonian front.

In the mid-1920s, after the Asia Minor Catastrophe, waves of refugees came to Kilkis, thus giving a new boost to the region and contributing to the increase of its population. Likewise, the Turks (a generic term for all Muslims, whether of Turkish, Albanian, Greek, or Bulgarian origin) of the region had to leave for the new Turkish state in the exchange of populations. In the aftermath of the Balkan Wars, World War I and the Greco-Turkish War (1919-1922) most of the Turkish and Bulgarian population of Kilkis emigrated, and many Greeks from Bulgaria and Turkey settled in the area, as prescribed by the Treaty of Lausanne. In fact, a very large segment of the population of Kilkis regional unit are in origin Caucasus Greeks (that is, Eastern Pontic Greeks) from the former Russian Imperial province of Kars Oblast in the South Caucasus. They left their homeland in the South Caucasus for Kilkis and other parts of Greek Macedonia, as well as southern Russia and Georgia, between 1919 and 1921, that is, between the main Greece-Turkey population exchange and Russia's cession of the Kars region back to Turkey as part of the Treaty of Brest Litovsk. By 1928, 1,679 refugee families containing 6,433 individuals had been resettled in Kilkis. Barely two decades later, World War II broke out and the region was devastated once again.

=== World War II ===
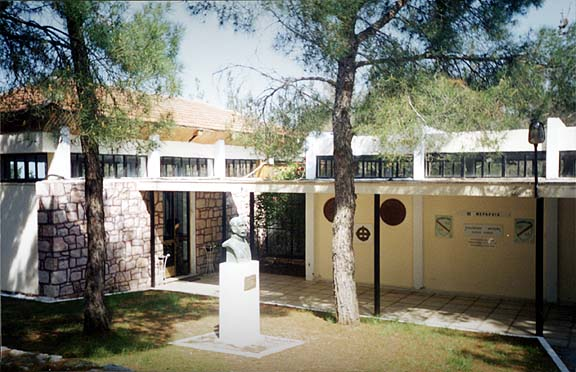
War museum

During the occupation of Greece by the Axis Powers in World War II, Kilkis was included in the German zone of occupation, but in 1943 it became part of Bulgarian zone, which was expanded to include the prefectures of Kilkis and Chalkidiki, after the Nazis allowed so. The most significant event during the occupation was the Battle of Kilkis which took place on 4 November 1944 between the communist-led EAM and a coalition of the collaborationist Security Battalions and nationalist resistance organizations.

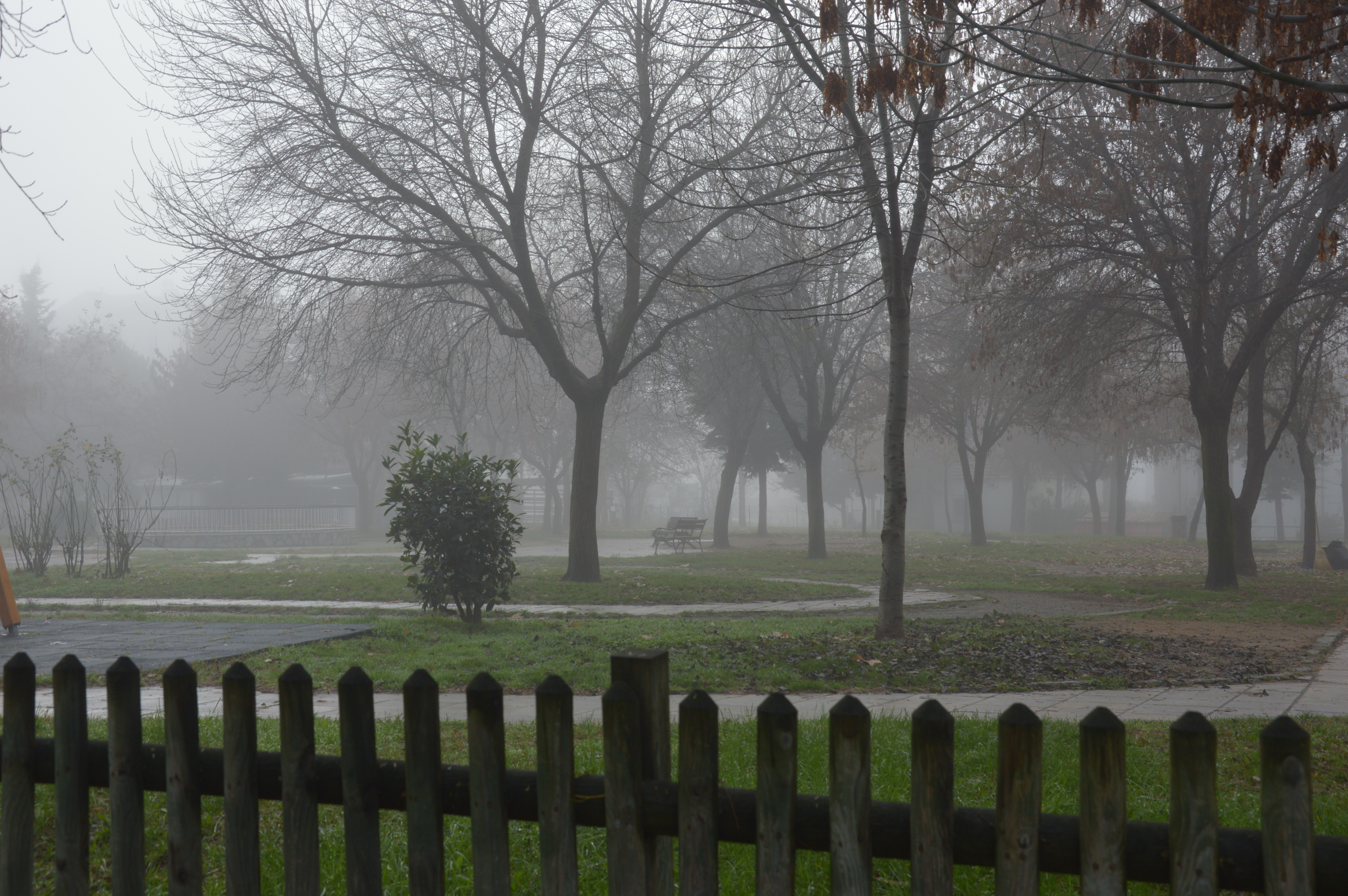
Park of the town

=== Post War Era ===
The town saw a construction boom in the 1970s and 80s that saw the replacement of most detached homes with multi storey apartment blocks. In 1974, 59% of the population of the municipality of Kilkis voted in favour of the republic in the referendum on the monarchy. A ring road was constructed in the 1980s.

== Culture ==
- Techni Art Association

== Economy ==
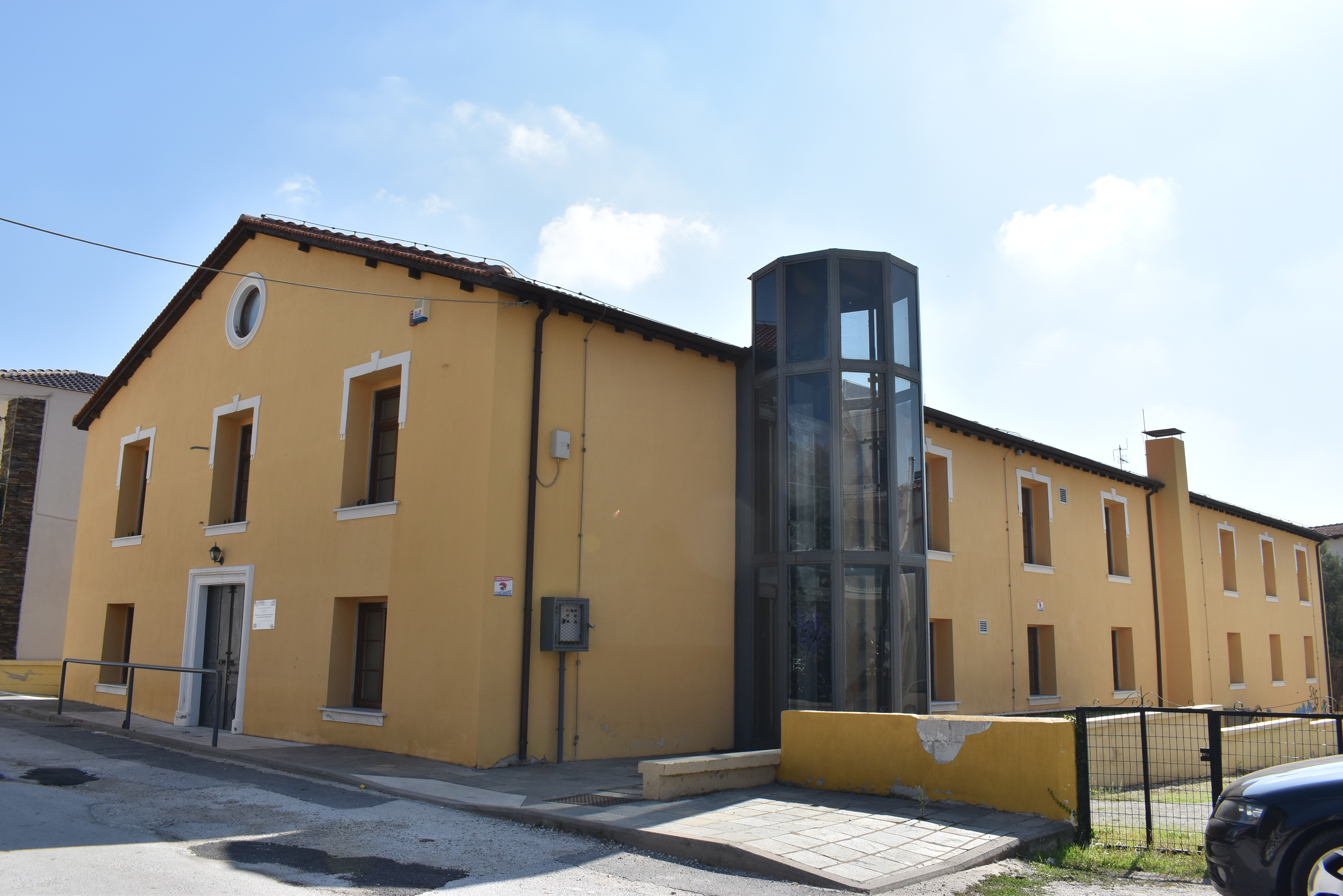
Warehouse of Austro-Greek Tobacco Company

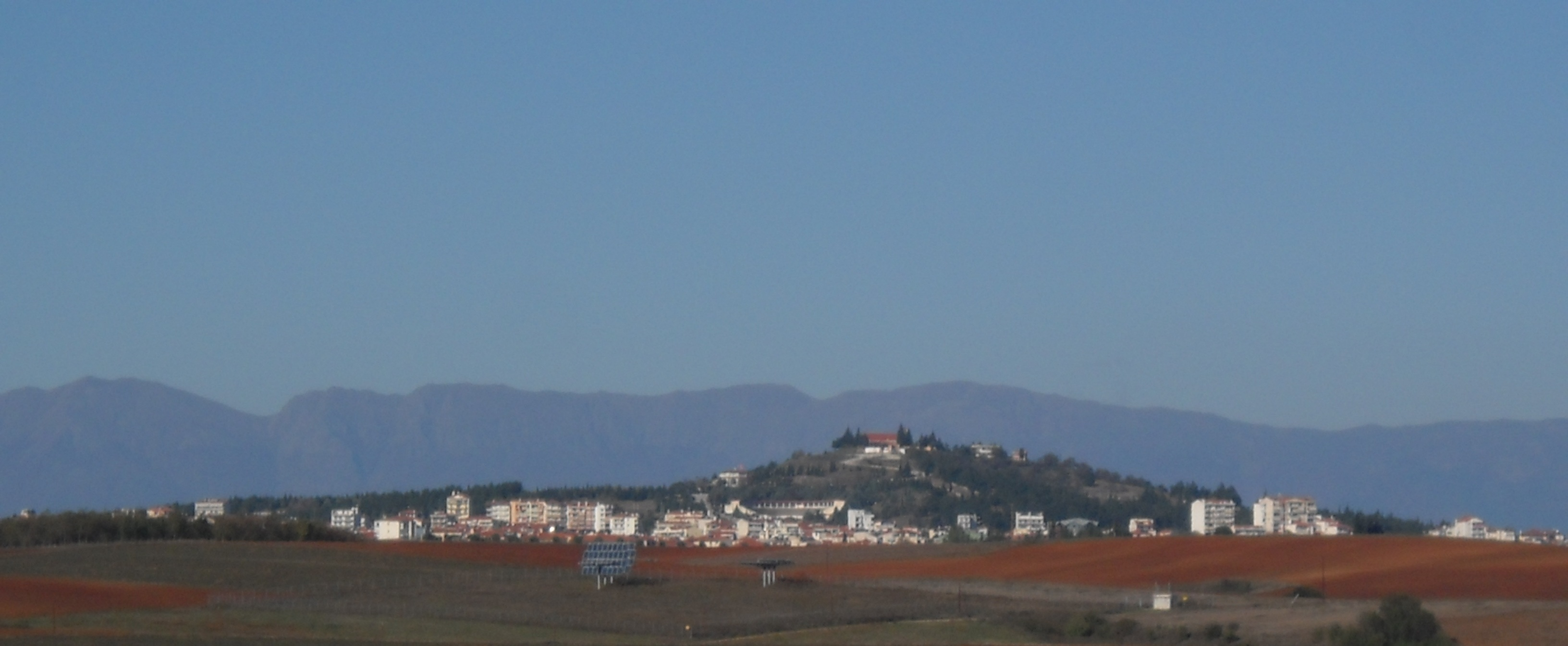
A part of the town and its surrounding farmfields

Kilkis is an industrialized town. ALUMIL, the largest non-ferrous metal industry in Greece, is based in Kilkis.

== Transport ==
=== Road Transport ===
The main road through the municipality is the EO65, whose northern end formerly ended in the city centre before the western bypass around the city was built: it was rerouted from the city and extended north to Rodopoli and the border with North Macedonia at Doirani in 1995, and then to the Strymonas bridge in 1998; it leads southbound to the A2 motorway (Egnatia Odos), northbound to the R1105 road in North Macedonia, and both ways to A25. Kilkis Provincial Road 9 connects Kilkis with Polykastro, and leads to the A1.

The Kilkis is served by KTEL Bus, which performs daily trips to/from Athens, Thessaloniki and other cities within Greece.

=== Rail transport ===
Kilkis has a train station on the Thessaloniki-Alexandroupoli line, with daily services to Thessaloniki and Alexandroupoli.

=== Air Transport ===
Kilkis currently does not have an airport; the nearest is Thessaloniki Airport, 66 km away.

== Sport teams ==
Kilkis hosts the football club Kilkisiakos F.C. with earlier presence in 2nd tier division of Greek championship and the handball club G.A.S. Kilkis which has won a Greek cup.

Sport clubs based in Kilkis
Club	Founded	Sports	Achievements
Kilkisiakos F.C.	1961	Football	Earlier presence in Beta Ethniki
G.A.S. Kilkis	1981	Handball	Panhellenic title in Greek handball

== People ==
- Sakis Boulas, actor
- Lika Chopova-Yurukova, publicist
- Viki Chadjivassiliou, journalist
- Petar Darvingov, officer and military historian
- Stefanos Dedas (born 1982), basketball head coach in the Israel Basketball Premier League
- Gotse Delchev (1872–1903), revolutionary
- Tuše Deliivanov, revolutionary
- Giorgos Floridis, politician
- Aristarchos Fountoukidis, footballer
- Valentini Grammatikopoulou, tennis player
- Dimitris Markos, footballer
- Loukas Mavrokefalidis, professional basketball player (1984)
- Ekaterina Panitsa (1884–1967), schoolteacher
- Hristo Smirnenski (1898–1923), poet
- Milan Stoilov (1881–1903), writer and revolutionary
- Savvas Tsitouridis, politician, ex-minister
- Konstantinos Vasileiadis, professional basketball player (1984)
- Nikos Vergos, footballer
- Dimitar Vlahov (1878–1953), politician

== See also ==
- Gallikos (river)
