= List of Commonwealth War Graves Commission World War I memorials to the missing =

The Commonwealth War Graves Commission (CWGC) aims to commemorate the UK and Commonwealth dead of the World Wars, either by maintaining a war grave in a cemetery, or where there is no known grave, by listing the dead on a memorial to the missing.

The majority of the memorials commissioned by the CWGC to commemorate the missing dead of World War I were erected in Belgium and France along or near to the Western Front. The following list is of the CWGC memorials to the missing of the First World War erected elsewhere, both in the UK and other regions of the worlds, limited to those that list more than 1000 names each.

The total from the 'numbers' column below of those listed on these memorials is 138,062.

== List of memorials ==
Commonwealth War Graves Commission (CWGC) World War I memorials
| Article and reference | Picture | Country | Location | Co-ordinates | Number listed | Description of those listed | Dates covered | Major battles | Date unveiled | Memorial designer | Memorial unveiled by |
|---|---|---|---|---|---|---|---|---|---|---|---|
| Basra Memorial CWGC | | Iraq | Basra | 30.4116°N 47.5458°E | 40,625 | UK and British Empire forces | Autumn 1914 to end of August 1921 | Mesopotamia Campaign | 27 March 1929 | Edward Warren | Gilbert Clayton |
| Helles Memorial CWGC | | Turkey | Cape Helles | 40.0458°N 26.1792°E | 20,884 | British, Indian and Australian forces | April 1915 to January 1916 | Gallipoli Campaign | 1924 | John James Burnet | not specified |
| India Gate CWGC | | India | New Delhi | 28.6129°N 77.2293°E | 13,216 | British Empire and Indian forces | entire war and to 1921 | North-West Frontier and Third Afghan War | 12 February 1931 | Edwin Lutyens | Lord Irwin |
| Tower Hill Memorial CWGC | | United Kingdom | London | 51.5097°N 0.0778°W | 12,210 | Mercantile Marine | entire war | naval transport and convoys | 12 December 1928 | Edwin Lutyens | Queen Mary |
| Portsmouth Naval Memorial CWGC | | United Kingdom | Portsmouth | 50.7824°N 1.0958°W | 9,667 | Royal Navy | entire war | naval campaigns | 15 October 1924 | Robert Lorimer | Duke of York |
| Chatham Naval Memorial CWGC | | United Kingdom | Chatham | 51.3836°N 0.5322°E | 8,517 | Royal Navy | entire war | naval campaigns | 26 April 1924 | Robert Lorimer | Prince of Wales |
| Plymouth Naval Memorial CWGC | | United Kingdom | Plymouth | 50.3644°N 4.1422°W | 7,251 | Royal Navy | entire war | naval campaigns | 29 July 1924 | Robert Lorimer | Prince George |
| Lone Pine Memorial CWGC | | Turkey | Gallipoli Peninsula | 40.2307°N 26.2871°E | 4,932 | Australian and New Zealand servicemen | mostly May to August 1915 | Battle of Lone Pine | 1925 | John James Burnet | no official unveiling |
| Port Tewfik Memorial CWGC | | Egypt | Port Suez | 29.9620°N 32.5582°E | 3,727 | British Indian Army | 1915 to 1918 | Sinai and Palestine Campaign | May 1926 | John James Burnet | Lord Lloyd |
| Tehran MemorialCWGC | | Iran | Tehran | 35.7765°N 51.4387°E | 3,580 | UK, Indian and New Zealand forces | December 1914 to October 1918 | Persian Campaign | not specified | not specified | not specified |
| Jerusalem Memorial CWGC | | Israel | Jerusalem | 31.7983°N 35.2397°E | 3,308 | Egyptian Expeditionary Force | 1915 to 1918 | Sinai and Palestine Campaign | 7 May 1927 | John James Burnet | Lord Allenby and James Parr |
| Bombay 1914-1918 Memorial CWGC | picture | India | Mumbai | 18.9549°N 72.8400°E | 2,206 | Indian, Adenese and East African sailors and Royal Indian Marine | entire war | naval campaigns and transport | not specified | not specified | not specified |
| Doiran Memorial CWGC | | Greece | Doirani | 41.1685°N 22.7623°E | 2,171 | British Salonika Force | October 1915 to November 1918 | Salonika Campaign | 25 September 1926 | Robert Lorimer | George Macdonogh |
| Hollybrook Memorial CWGC | picture | United Kingdom | Southampton | 50.9338°N 1.4311°W | 1,897 | Land and air forces lost at sea | entire war | SS Mendi and other ships | 10 December 1930 | T. Newham | William Robertson |
| Dar es Salaam British and Indian Memorial CWGC | picture | Tanzania | Dar es Salaam | 6.7743°S 39.2447°E | 1,528 | British Empire and Indian forces | during and after January 1917 | East African Campaign | not specified | not specified | not specified |
| Nairobi British and Indian Memorial CWGC | picture | Kenya | Nairobi | 1.2991°S 36.8237°E | 1,234 | British Empire and Indian forces | before January 1917 | East African Campaign | not specified | not specified | not specified |
| Freetown Memorial CWGC | picture | Sierra Leone | Freetown | 8.4889°N 13.2355°W | 1,109 | West African Frontier Force | entire war | Campaigns in West Africa | not specified | not specified | not specified |
| East African Memorials CWGC CWGC CWGC | | Kenya and Tanzania | Mombasa, Nairobi and Dar es Salaam | 4.0598°S 39.6934°E 1.2842°S 36.8222°E 6.8166°S 39.2895°E | none | King's African Rifles and Carrier Corps | entire war | East African Campaign | not specified | not specified | not specified |

== See also ==
- List of war cemeteries and memorials on the Gallipoli Peninsula
- List of Commonwealth War Graves Commission World War II memorials to the missing
