= La Ferté-sous-Jouarre memorial =

La Ferté-sous-Jouarre
- Commonwealth War Graves Commission
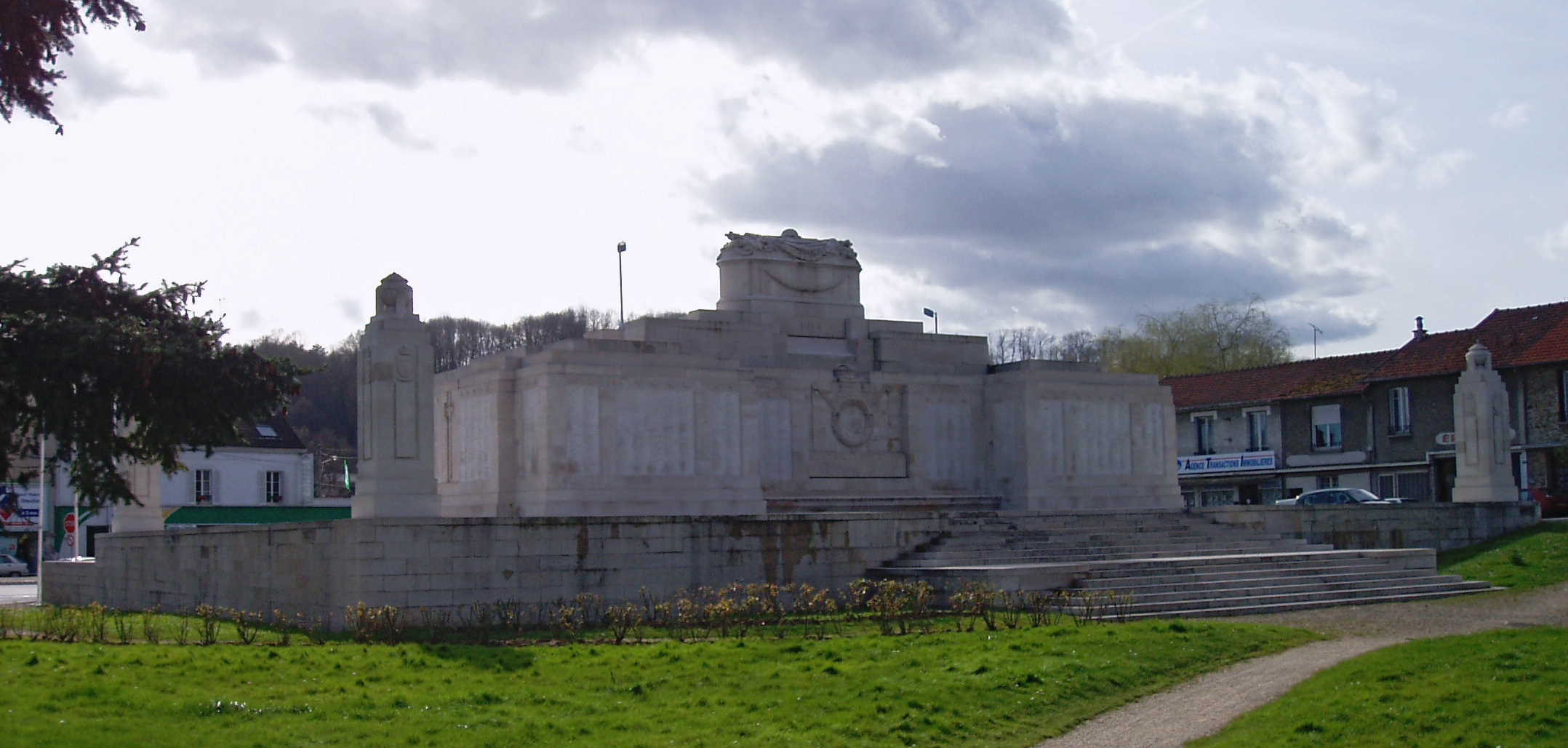
- The memorial viewed from the north-east, approaching from along the south bank of the river
- For British Expeditionary Force
- Unveiled: 1928
- Location: 48°56′36″N 3°7′25″E
- Designed by: George H. Goldsmith
- Commemorated: 3739
- To the glory of God and the lasting memory of 3888 British officers and men whose graves are not known who landed in France in the month of August 1914 and between then and October fought at Mons and Le Cateau and on the Marne and the Aisne

The La Ferté-sous-Jouarre memorial is a World War I memorial in France, located on the south bank of the river Marne, on the outskirts of the commune of La Ferté-sous-Jouarre, 66 kilometres east of Paris, in the department of Seine-et-Marne. Also known as the Memorial to the Missing of the Marne, it commemorates over 3,700 British and Irish soldiers with no known grave, who fell in battle in this area in August, September and early October 1914. The soldiers were part of the British Expeditionary Force, and are listed on the memorial by regiment, rank and then alphabetically.

== Memorial ==
The memorial itself is a rectangular block of white stone, 62 feet by 30 feet and 24 feet high, surmounted by a large stone sarcophagus. On top of the sarcophagus are carved representations of trophies of war, including a flag, bayonets, and a helmet. The year 1914 is carved below the sarcophagus, while the names of the dead are carved in panels on all four sides of the memorial. The two shorter sides of the memorial are decorated with a carved, downwards pointing sword, while the front and back of the memorial are carved with inscription panels surmounted by a carved wreath and a carved stone crown. The inscription on the river-facing side is in French, while the inscription on the other side is in English. The memorial is mounted on a stepped stone pavement, at the four corners of which are stone pillars, carved with the coats of arms of the British Empire (the coats of arms are labelled England, Scotland, Wales and Ireland), and topped by stone urns. One of the stone pillars was designed to hold a memorial register, which is now kept at the local town hall. At the front of the memorial's pavement is a stone of remembrance inscribed with the words: "Their name liveth for evermore."

== Inscriptions ==
The memorial's French inscription says:

A la gloire de Dieu et en souvenir durable des 3888 officiers et soldats dont les tombes ne sont pas connues appartenant au Corps Expéditionnaire Britannique qui, mobilisé le 5 Août 1914, débarqua en France en Août 1914 et combattit à Mons, au Cateau, sur la Marne, sur l'Aisne, jusqu'en Octobre 1914.

The memorial's English inscription says:

To the glory of God and the lasting memory of 3888 British officers and men whose graves are not known who landed in France in the month of August 1914 and between then and October fought at Mons and Le Cateau and on the Marne and the Aisne.

== History ==
The memorial was built on land given by Adrien Fizeau, former mayor of Jouarre, in memory of his father Hippolyte Fizeau (1819–1896), a member of both the Institut de France and of the Royal Society. The Fizeau connection is commemorated by bilingual inscriptions either side of the steps leading up to the river-facing side of the memorial. This memorial was one of only four free-standing (outside proposed permanent war cemeteries) British World War I memorials to the missing eventually built on French soil. There had originally been proposals by the Imperial War Graves Commission to build 13 free-standing memorials to the missing in France, but this was eventually reduced to four: the Thiepval Memorial to the Missing of the Somme, the Neuve-Chapelle Indian Memorial to the Missing of the Army of India, the Soissons Memorial to the Missing that fell in the German offensives in 1918, and this memorial at La Ferté-sous-Jouarre to the Missing of the Marne. This memorial was the only one of the four where the design was opened to competition. The winning design was by the minor war cemetery architect Major George Hartley Goldsmith MC, who had studied under Sir Edwin Lutyens.

The La Ferté-sous-Jouarre memorial was unveiled on 4 November 1928. The British and French military officers present at the dedication ceremony included Ferdinand Foch, Maxime Weygand, George Milne and William Pulteney Pulteney. The ceremony also commemorated the contributions of Joseph Joffre, John French, and Michel-Joseph Maunoury, the commanders of the armies who had fought in the area. French in particular was the first commander of the British Expeditionary Force in World War I. Maunoury and French had died in 1923 and 1925, while Foch would die in 1929 and Joffre in 1931. The memorial is maintained by the Commonwealth War Graves Commission (as the Imperial War Graves Commission was renamed), and the site includes flower beds and a small park with an avenue of trees. On 27 July 2004, the memorial was rededicated during the 90th anniversary commemorations of the battles, in a ceremony attended by Sir John Holmes, the British ambassador to France.

== Royal Engineers memorials ==
Near the main memorial, on each bank of the river, either side of the nearby bridge, are two identical memorials commemorating the Royal Engineers who built, under fire, a floating bridge at this location in 1914. They were the 7th Field Company and 9th Field Company RE. The English inscription says:

At this point was built under fire by the Royal Engineers of the 4th Division a floating bridge for the passage of the left wing of the British Expeditionary Force after the Battle of the Marne. Portions of the division had already crossed by boat at the weir near Luzancy and below the destroyed bridges.

== Communal Cemetery burials ==
The nearby La Ferté-sous-Jouarre Communal Cemetery contains the graves of five British Empire soldiers (including one unidentified) who died in September 1914.

== Battles ==
Troop movements in this area during World War I include the 1st Division crossing the river Marne here on 3 September on their way south to Rozoy during the Retreat from Mons. The 4th Division crossed here a week later on 9 September on their advance northwards to the river Aisne, during the Battle of the Marne. One of those commemorated on the memorial is the Royal Artillery driver Cobey, who is featured in a painting by Terence Cuneo.

== Photo gallery ==
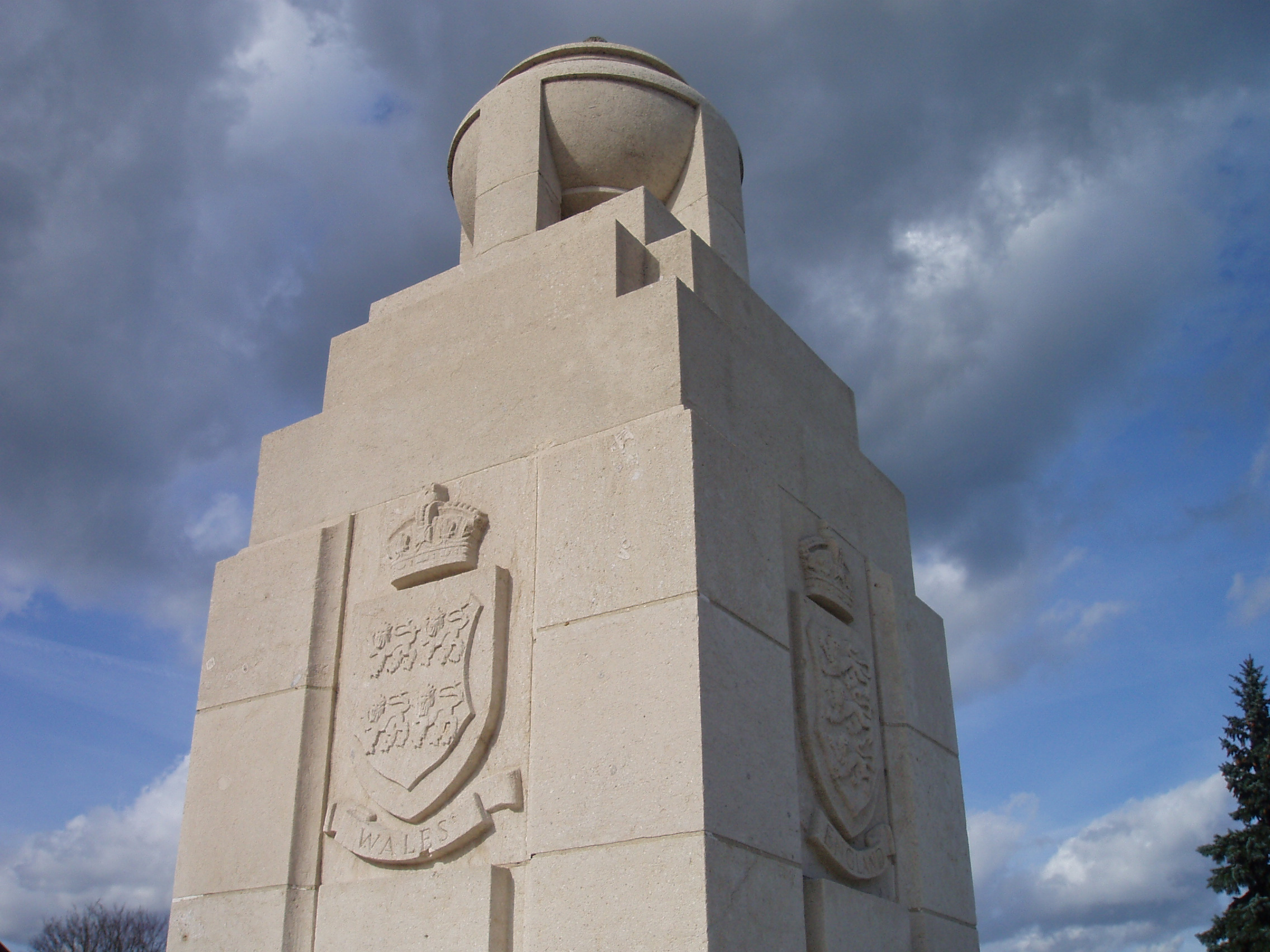
One of the memorial's four corner pillars, with coats of arms for Wales and England.

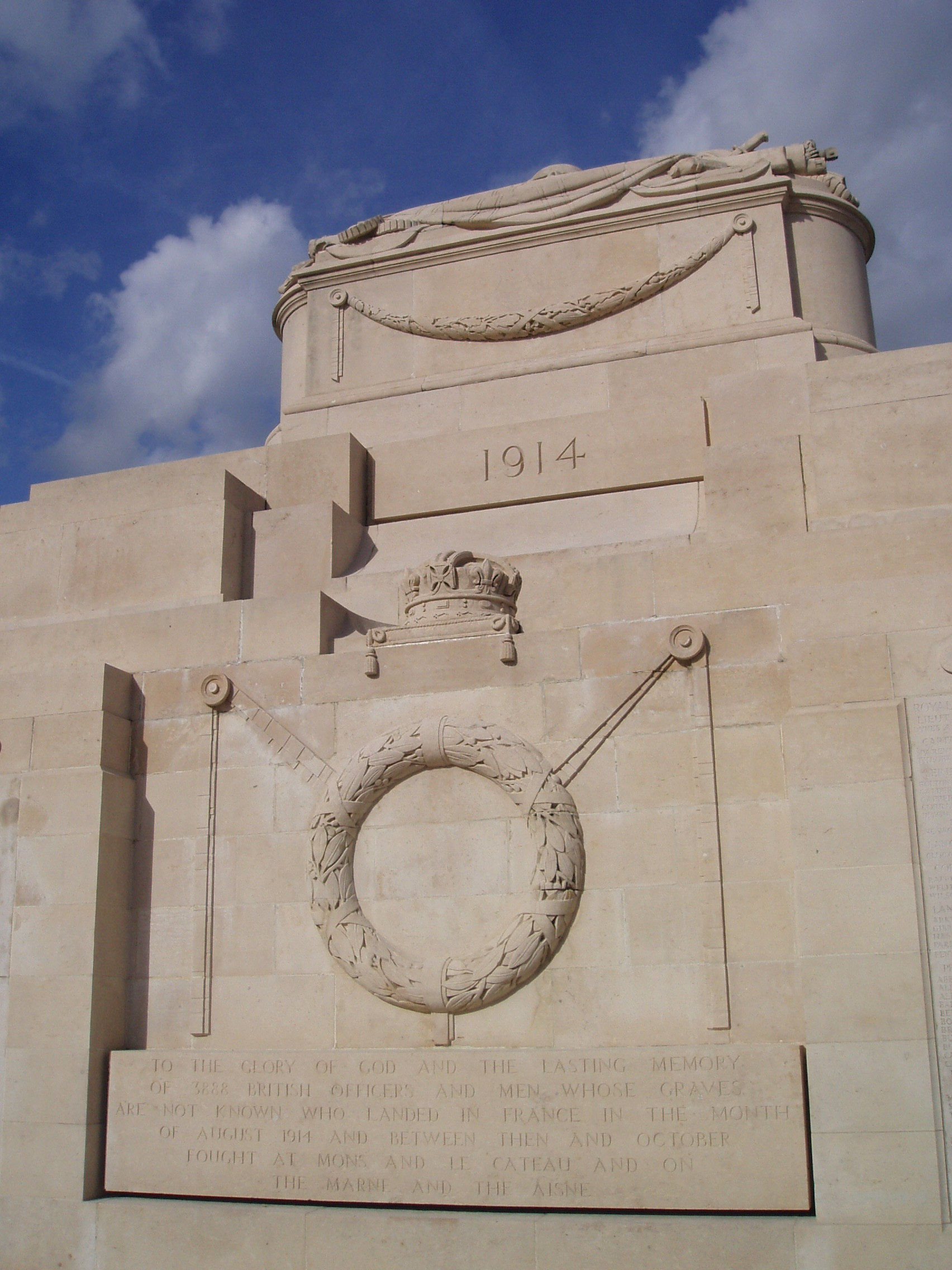
The memorial's sarcophagus, crown and wreath carvings, and the English inscription.

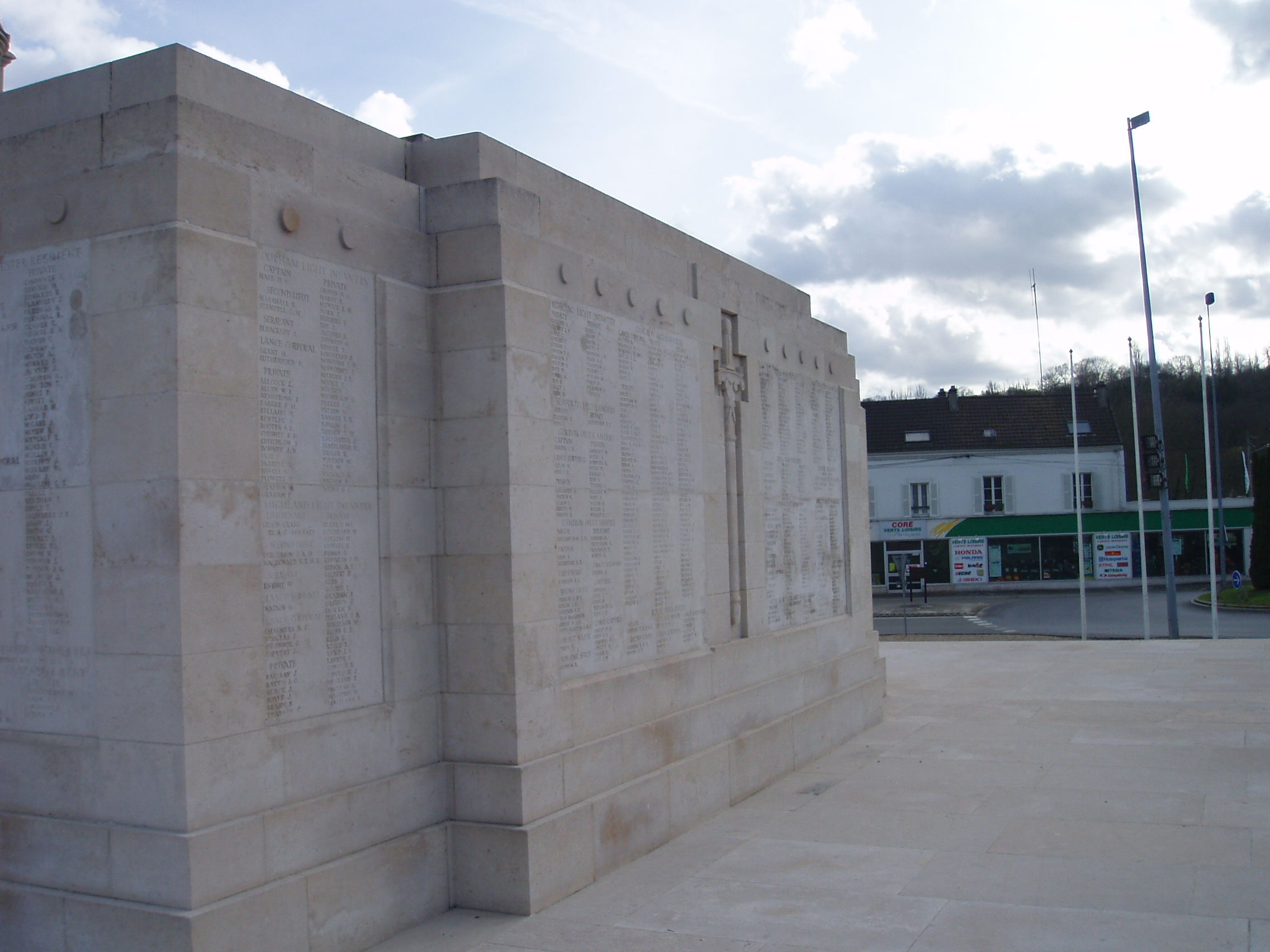
Panels of names on one side of the memorial, with one of the two sword carvings.

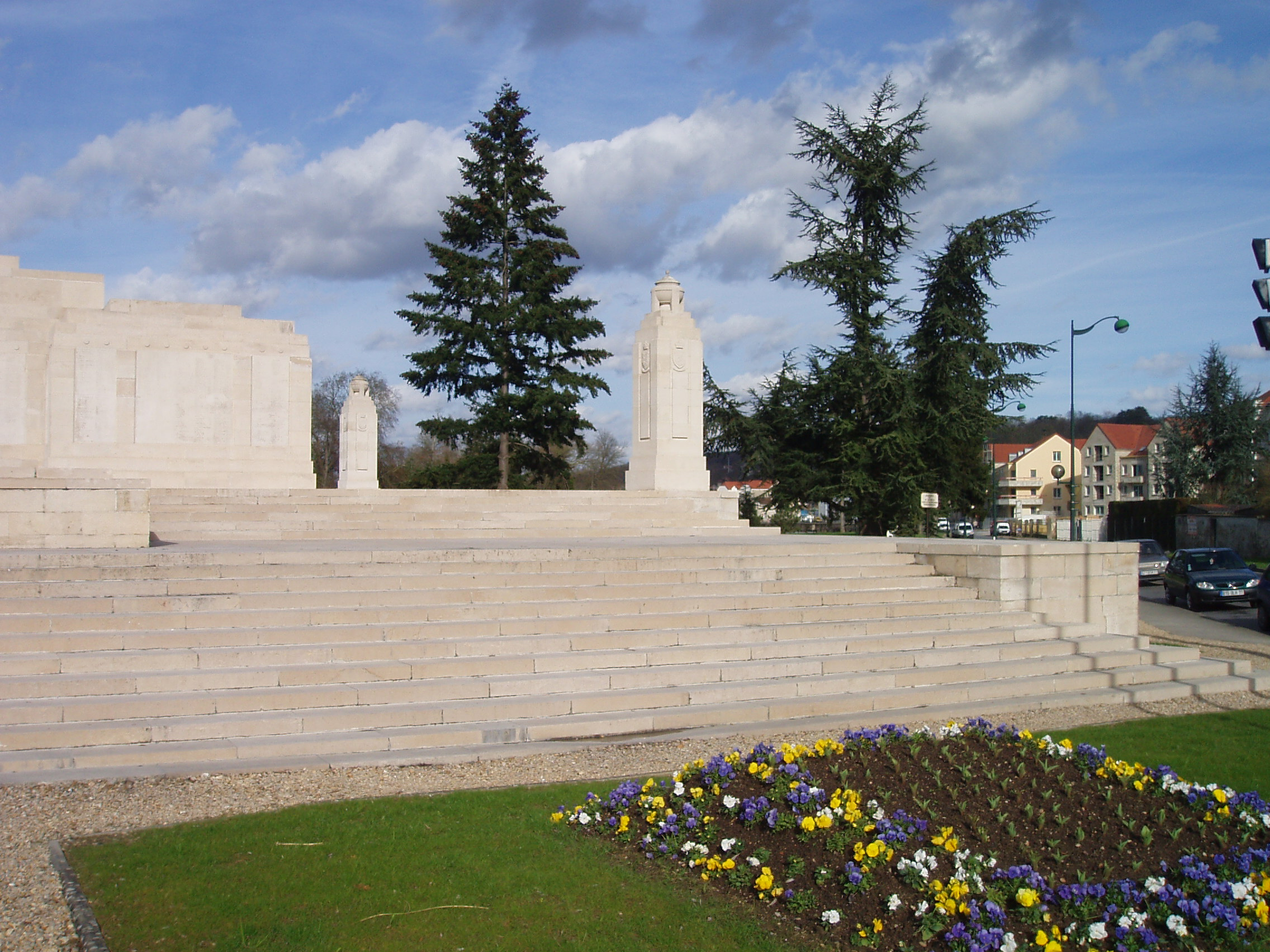
Flower bed and steps in front of the memorial, with two of the four pillars.

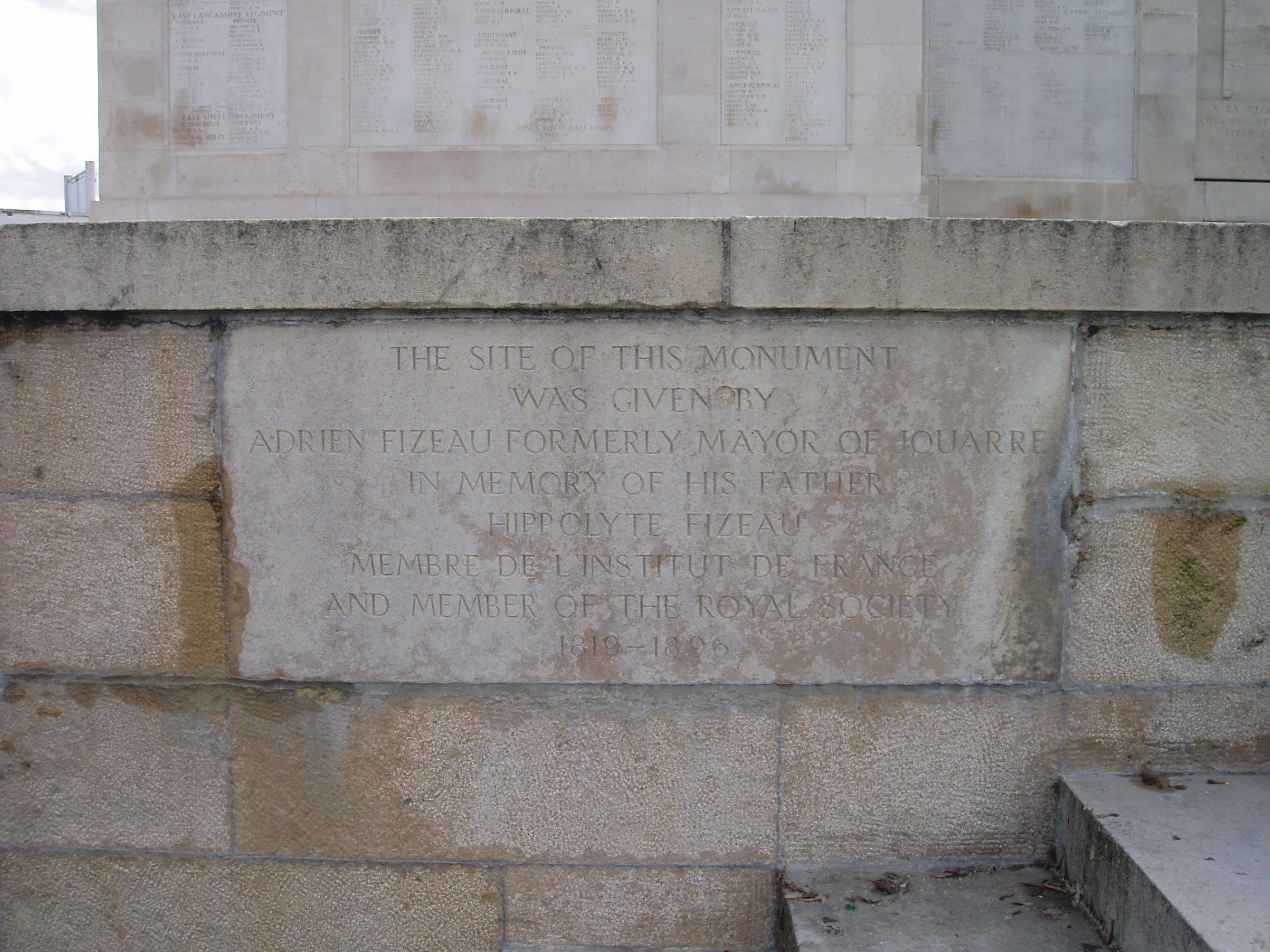
Inscription explaining the Fizeau donation of the land for the memorial.

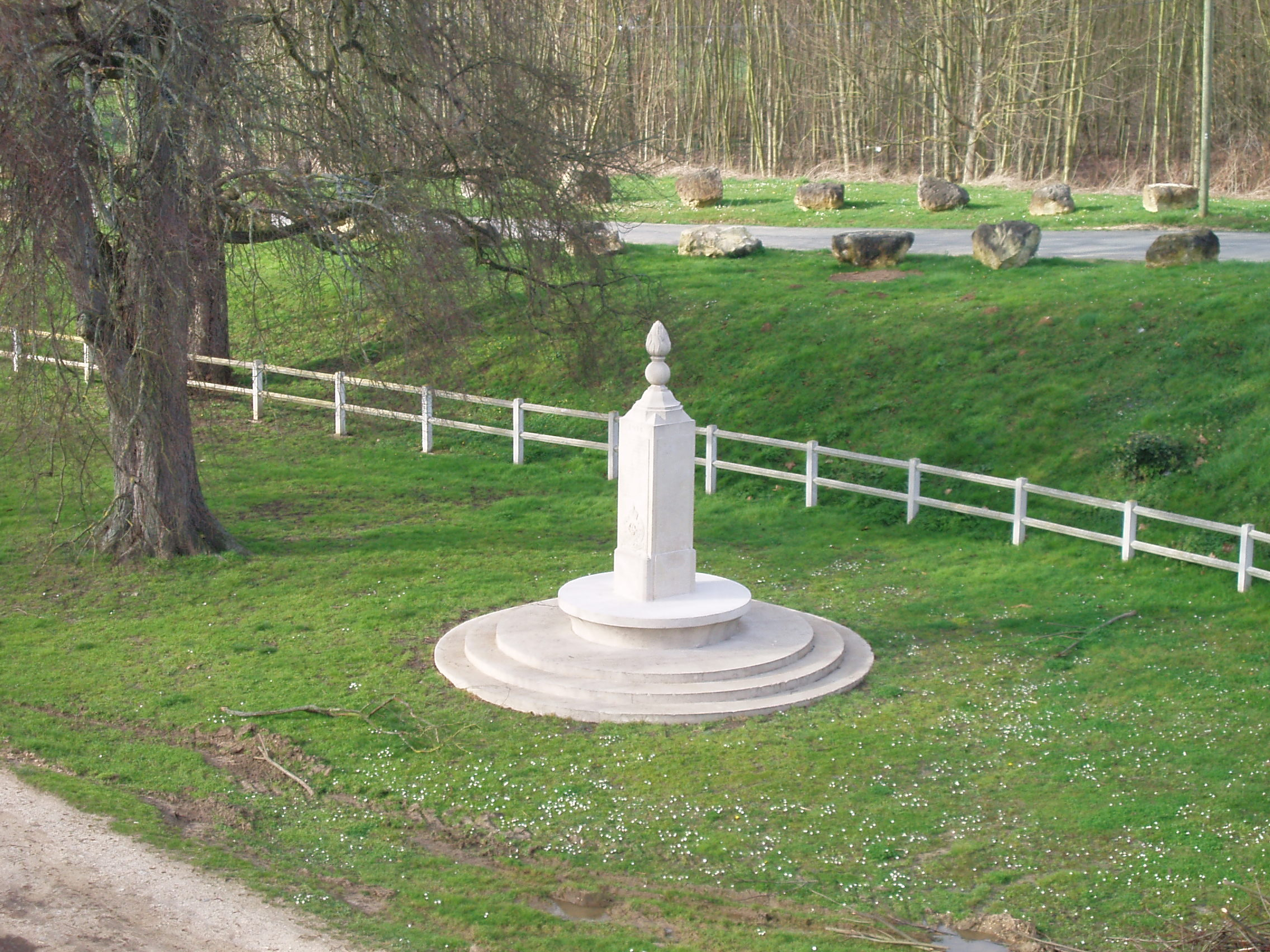
The Royal Engineers memorial on the north bank of the river Marne.

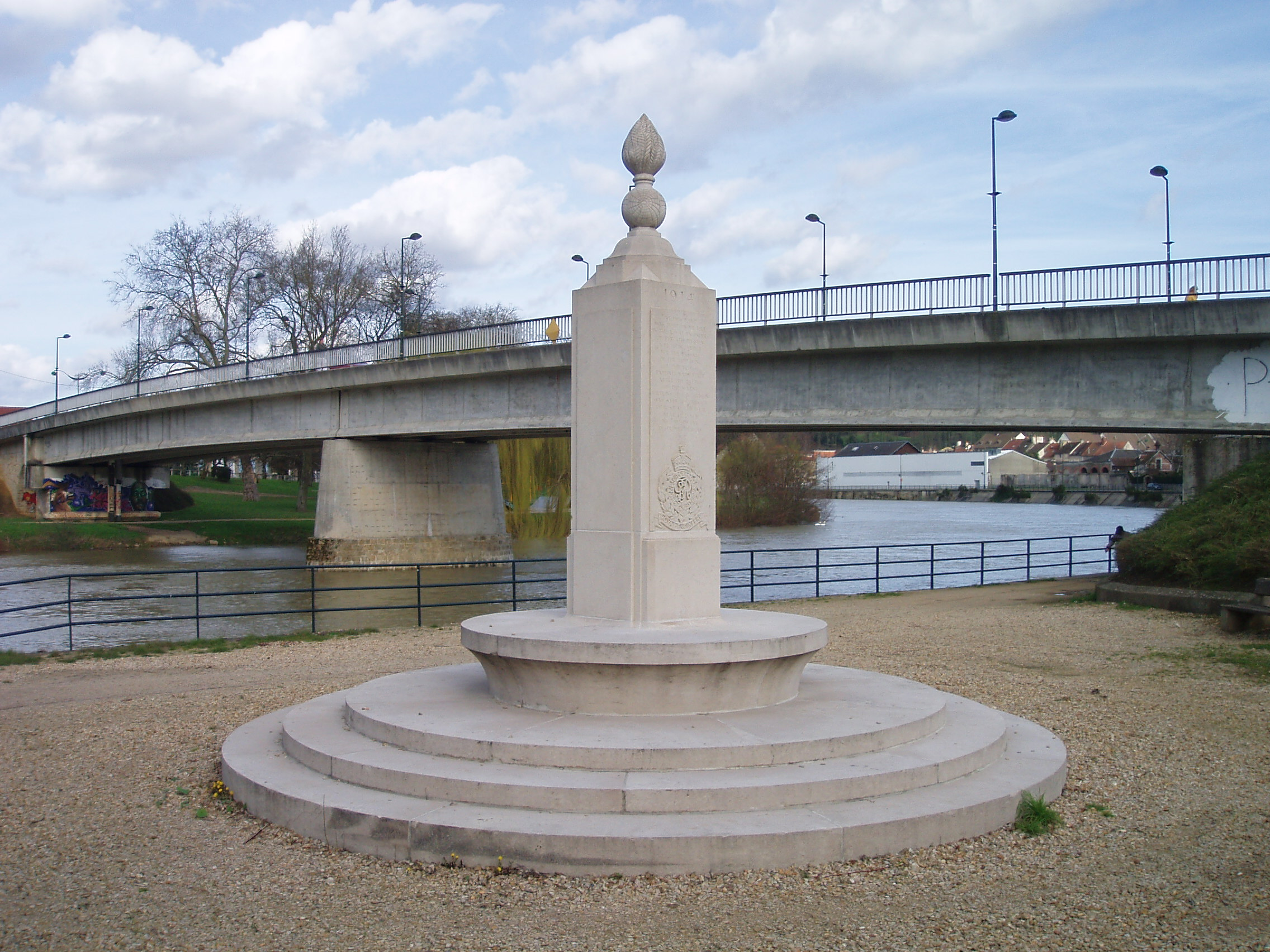
The Royal Engineers memorial on the south bank, with the bridge in the background.

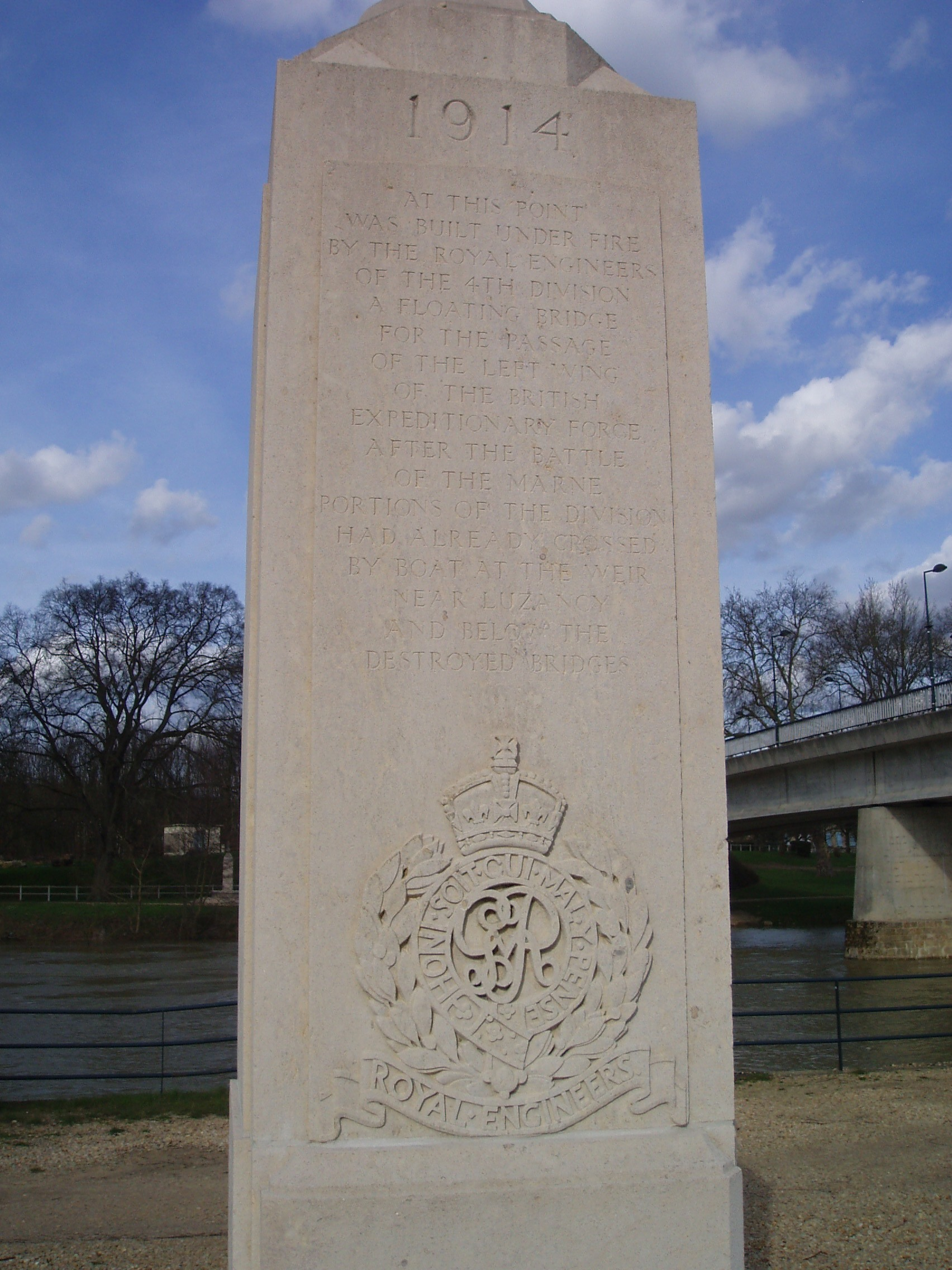
The inscription on one of the Royal Engineers memorials.

== See also ==
- Battle of Mons (23 August 1914)
- Retreat from Mons (24 August - 5 September 1914)
- Battle of Le Cateau (26–27 August 1914)
- First Battle of the Marne (5–12 September 1914)
- First Battle of the Aisne (13–28 September 1914)
