= Taukkyan Roadblock =

World War II engagement in Burma (1942)

Coordinates: 17°02′29″N 96°08′02″E

- Part of the Japanese invasion of Burma of World War II
Date	7 March 1942 – 8 March 1942
Location	Taukkyan, Burma
Result	Allied victory Japanese withdrawal

Belligerents
British Empire: British Raj	Empire of Japan

Commanders and leaders
(United Kingdom) Harold Alexander	(Empire of Japan) Shōzō Sakurai

The Taukkyan Roadblock was an engagement in the Burma campaign in World War II. It was an attempt to clear a roadblock held by elements of the Japanese 33rd Division, which was preventing the evacuation of the main force of the Burma Army from Rangoon. After heavy fighting throughout 7 March 1942, and a counterattack that night, the roadblock was taken on the early morning of 8 March, with little resistance. As a result, the Burma Army was able to withdraw northwards unimpeded, and avoid being captured in Rangoon by the Japanese forces.

== Background ==
Taukkyan is a village north of Rangoon, at a junction where the road from Rangoon north towards Prome met the road eastwards to Pegu. Pegu is strategically located to cover Rangoon from an attack from the east, and so in early 1942 it had been garrisoned by a force of Indian troops from the 48th Indian Infantry Brigade. However, this force had been outflanked by a Japanese attack, and was now surrounded. On the 6th of March, a force from 1st Battalion 11th Sikh Regiment was sent north from Rangoon to relieve Pegu, but stopped partway to take up a defensive position on the Taukkyan-Pegu road, after reports of extensive Japanese infiltration. The battalion held this position overnight, and early on the 7th, following the Battle of Pegu, the survivors of the garrison pulled out of Pegu and fell back through their lines. That evening, the battalion then withdrew towards Taukkyan.

Meanwhile, on the 6th, the decision had been made to evacuate Rangoon and march north towards Prome. However, the Japanese army had moved around the garrisons on the Pegu road, and had established a strong roadblock at Taukkyan. As a result, the whole of Burma Army, including the Army HQ for Burma, the bulk of 17th Indian Division, and 7th Armoured Brigade were caught in Rangoon, unable to retreat northwards.

== Fight for Taukkyan ==
It became apparent that the roadblock needed to be cleared, as otherwise the bulk of the Burma Army would be surrounded. The first attack, on the 7th, was made by a troop of M3 Stuart light tanks, from the 7th Hussars, with infantry support; however, they withdrew with the loss of one tank and heavy infantry casualties. A second attack was made by a squadron of 2nd Royal Tank Regiment with artillery support, and by the 1st Battalion Gloucestershire Regiment, but this was unsuccessful. The final attack that day was made by two companies of the 2nd/13th Frontier Force Rifles, which again failed, and the surviving forces withdrew to establish a defensive perimeter for the night. The Japanese launched a heavy counter-attack during the night, but despite being pushed into hand-to-hand combat, the battalion was still holding its place the next morning.

The only fresh troops available were the 1st/11th Sikhs, withdrawing from Pegu, and the 1st/10th Gurkha Rifles. A plan was prepared for them to attack the roadblock at 8.45 on the morning of the 8th, with artillery support. A squadron from the 7th Hussars would support the attack; other units involved included a detachment of the Burma Military Police, attached to the Gloucestershire Regiment. Whilst moving into position, the Sikhs were attacked by a force of Japanese aircraft, taking severe casualties; the Gurkhas, meanwhile, lost their way to the forming-up area and did not arrive in time.

The artillery barrage failed to materialise, and the 11th Sikhs and 7th Hussars moved toward the roadblock, with the Sikhs breaking into an unexpected bayonet charge. The small garrison present immediately abandoned the roadblock and fled, leaving the British forces in control without any significant resistance.

== Aftermath ==
Japanese forces launched a small counter-attack in approximately platoon strength, with air support, shortly after the Sikhs had occupied the roadblock, but were quickly repelled. This was the limit of the Japanese response. It later transpired that General Iida, the Japanese commander, had anticipated that the British would stand and fight in Rangoon, and so had ordered the 33rd Division, the force moving against the city, to push forwards with speed rather than to try and surround the city. As a result, a strong roadblock had been laid at Taukkyan, but only with the intention of protecting the division's flanks; once it had passed through and was marching on Rangoon, the garrison was withdrawn.

The first of the rear-area units passed through the roadblock shortly after it was secured, and the convoys continued until around noon, at which point the bulk of Burma Army had been fully evacuated. The combat units withdrew through Taukkyan at around 4.30pm, and the Sikh rearguard moved northwards at 6pm.

The battle honour of Taukyan was awarded to one British regiment, the Gloucestershire Regiment, for their role in the engagement. It was not claimed by the 7th Hussars or the Royal Tank Regiment, nor by the 11th Sikhs.
