= List of Commonwealth War Graves Commission World War II memorials to the missing =

The Commonwealth War Graves Commission (CWGC) aims to commemorate the UK and Commonwealth dead of the World Wars, either by maintaining a war grave in a cemetery, or where there is no known grave, by listing the dead on a memorial to the missing. This is a listing of those memorials maintained solely or jointly by the CWGC that commemorate by name the British and Commonwealth dead from World War II whose bodies were not recovered, or whose remains could not be identified. Also included here are memorials to those who were cremated, and the Rolls of Honour that commemorate land and naval losses of undivided India during the Second World War. This listing is of the CWGC memorials with over 4000 names commemorated. The total number of names inscribed on the memorials or rolls of honour listed here, according to the CWGC figures given in the table below, is 188,971.

== List of memorials ==
Commonwealth War Graves Commission (CWGC) World War II memorials
Article and reference	Picture	Country	Location	Co-ordinates	Number listed	Description of those listed	Dates covered	Major battles	Date unveiled	Memorial designer	Memorial unveiled by
Rangoon Memorial CWGC		Myanmar	Taukkyan	17.0356°N 96.1317°E	26,851	Commonwealth nations	January 1942 to July 1945	Burma Campaign	9 February 1958	Henry J. Brown	Francis Festing
Delhi/Karachi 1939-1945 War Memorial CWGC	picture	India and Pakistan	Delhi and Karachi	28.6162°N 77.1452°E 24.8949°N 67.0909°E	25,866	Servicemen of British India	entire war	non-operational zones	n/a	n/a	n/a
Singapore Memorial CWGC		Singapore	Kranji	1.4185°N 103.7580°E	24,303	Commonwealth nations	mostly December 1941 and January 1942	Malayan and Indonesian campaigns	2 March 1957	Colin St Clair Oakes	Robert Black
Tower Hill Memorial (extension) CWGC		United Kingdom	London	51.5097°N 0.0778°W	23,831	Mercantile Marine	entire war	naval transport and convoys	5 November 1955	Edward Maufe (extension)	Queen Elizabeth II
Runnymede Memorial CWGC		United Kingdom	Runnymede	51.4378°N 0.5650°W	20,291	Royal Air Force	entire war	aerial missions	17 October 1953	Edward Maufe	Queen Elizabeth II
Plymouth Naval Memorial (extension) CWGC		United Kingdom	Plymouth	50.3644°N 4.1422°W	15,933	Royal Navy	entire war	naval campaigns	20 May 1954	Edward Maufe (extension)	Princess Margaret
Portsmouth Naval Memorial (extension) CWGC		United Kingdom	Portsmouth	50.7824°N 1.0958°W	14,918	Royal Navy	entire war	naval campaigns	29 April 1953	Edward Maufe (extension)	Queen Elizabeth The Queen Mother
Alamein Memorial CWGC	picture	Egypt	El Alamein	30.8372°N 28.9469°E	11,864	Commonwealth nations	up to 19 February 1943	Battles of El Alamein (First; Second)	24 October 1954	Hubert Worthington	Bernard Montgomery
Chatham Naval Memorial (extension) CWGC		United Kingdom	Chatham	51.3836°N 0.5322°E	10,098	Royal Navy	entire war	naval campaigns	15 October 1952	Edward Maufe (extension)	Prince Philip
Bombay/Chittagong 1939-1945 War Memorial CWGC	picture	India and Bangladesh	Mumbai and Chittagong	18.9549°N 72.8400°E 22.3574°N 91.8282°E	6,467	Sailors and merchant seamen of British India	entire war	naval campaigns and transport	n/a	n/a	n/a
Dunkirk Memorial CWGC		France	Dunkirk	51.029741°N 2.388475°E	4,505	British Expeditionary Force	mostly 1939 and 1940	Battle of Dunkirk	29 June 1957	Philip Hepworth	Queen Elizabeth The Queen Mother
Cassino Memorial CWGC	picture	Italy	Cassino	41.4776°N 13.8271°E	4,044	Commonwealth nations	10 July 1943 to 2 May 1945	Italian Campaign	30 September 1956	Louis de Soissons	Harold Alexander

== See also ==
- List of Commonwealth War Graves Commission World War I memorials to the missing
- List of Commonwealth War Graves Commission World War I memorials to the missing in Belgium and France
