= Chersos railway station =

Railway station in Greece

Χέρσο Cherso

General information
- Location: Cherso 610 02, Kilkis; Greece
- Coordinates: 41°05′25″N 22°46′59″E
- Owner: GAIAOSE
- Line: Thessaloniki–Alexandroupolis railway
- Platforms: 1
- Tracks: 1
- Train operators: Hellenic Train
- Connections: Proastiakos

Construction
- Structure type: at-grade
- Platform levels: 1
- Parking: No
- Cycle facilities: No

Other information
- Status: unstaffed
- Website: http://www.ose.gr/en/

History
- Opened: 1900
- Rebuilt: unknown
- Electrified: No

Services
Preceding station	Regional Rail	Following station
Metalliko towards Thessaloniki	Line T3	Κalindia towards Drama
Suspended services
Preceding station	Hellenic Train	Following station
Kilkis towards Thessaloniki	InterCity Thessaloniki–Alexandroupoli Fast train	Mouries towards Alexandroupoli
Metalliko towards Thessaloniki	InterCity Thessaloniki–Alexandroupoli	Doirani towards Alexandroupoli
Metalliko towards Thessaloniki	InterCity Thessaloniki–Serres	Doirani towards Serres
Location
- Location within Greece

Chersos railway station (Greek: Σιδηροδρομικός Σταθμός Χέρσο, romanized: Sidirodromikós stathmós Hersos) is a railway station that serves the town of Cherso, in Kilkis in Central Macedonia, Greece. The station is located close to the centre of the settlement. An interesting feature of this station is that the platform juts out into the now-disused second line, with no buffers.

== History ==
The station opened in 1900 as part of the Salonica Monastir railway, built by the Enotikos Thessalonica-Istanbul Company The station, along with the line west, was annexed by Greece on 18 October 1912 during the First Balkan War. In the summer (July–August) of 1913, during the final phase of the Second Balkan War the station was looted by retreating Bulgarian troops. This was recorded for posterity by postcards printed depicting the events.

On 17 October 1925, The Greek government purchased the Greek sections of the former Salonica Monastir railway, and the railway became part of the Hellenic State Railways, with the remaining section north of Florina seeded to Yugoslavia. In 1970, OSE became the legal successor to the SEK, taking over responsibilities for most of Greece's rail infrastructure. On 1 January 1971, the station and most of the Greek rail infrastructure were transferred to the Hellenic Railways Organisation S.A., a state-owned corporation. Freight traffic declined sharply when the state-imposed monopoly of OSE for the transport of agricultural products and fertilisers ended in the early 1990s. Many small stations of the network with little passenger traffic were closed down. In 2001 the infrastructure element of OSE was created, known as GAIAOSE; it would henceforth be responsible for the maintenance of stations, bridges and other elements of the network, as well as the leasing and the sale of railway assists. In 2003, OSE launched "Proastiakos SA", as a subsidiary to serve the operation of the suburban network in the urban complex of Athens during the 2004 Olympic Games. In 2005, TrainOSE was created as a brand within OSE to concentrate on rail services and passenger interface.

In 2008, all Proastiakos services were transferred from OSE to TrainOSE. In 2009, with the Greek debt crisis unfolding OSE's Management was forced to reduce services across the network. Timetables were cut back, and routes closed as the government-run entity attempted to reduce overheads. Services from Thessaloniki and Alexandroupolis were reduced from six to just two trains a day, reducing the reliability of services and passenger numbers. In 2017 OSE's passenger transport sector was privatised as TrainOSE, currently a wholly owned subsidiary of Ferrovie dello Stato Italiane infrastructure, including stations, remained under the control of OSE. Since 2020, the station has been served by the Thessaloniki Regional Railway (formerly the Suburban Railway).

In early 2022 Minister of Infrastructure and Transport Costas Karamanlis, announced from 4 February, an additional route will be operated every day, calling at Mouries, Doirani, Hersos, Kristoni, Pedinou and Galliko Kilkis. The move was welcomed by the mayor of Serres, Alexandros Chrysafis. In July 2022, the station began being served by Hellenic Train, the rebranded TranOSE

In August 2025, the Greek Ministry of Infrastructure and Transport confirmed the creation of a new body, Greek Railways (Greek: Σιδηρόδρομοι Ελλάδος, romanized: Ellinikí Sidiródromi Monoprósopi) to assume responsibility for rail infrastructure, planning, modernisation projects, and rolling stock across Greece. Previously, these functions were divided among several state-owned entities: OSE, which managed infrastructure; ERGOSÉ, responsible for modernisation projects; and GAIAOSÉ, which owned stations, buildings, and rolling stock. OSE had overseen both infrastructure and operations until its vertical separation in 2005. Rail safety has been identified as a key priority. The merger follows the July approval of a Parliamentary Bill to restructure the national railway system, a direct response to the Tempi accident of February 2023, in which 43 people died after a head-on collision.

== Facilities ==
The old station building has since been demolished, replaced with a smaller simpler brick shelter. The single platform razed; as of (2021) the station is unstaffed, with no staffed booking office and just a simple waiting room. Access to the platforms is via ramps and level-crossing. The platforms have no outside seating, Dot-matrix display departure and arrival screens or timetable poster boards for passenger information. The station remains little more than an unstaffed halt, with no onsite parking.

== Services ==
As of 12 May 2025, Line 3 of the Thessaloniki Regional Railway calls at this station: service is currently limited, with two trains per day to Thessaloniki (trains 1635 and 3633), one train per day to Serres (3632), and one train per day to Drama (1634, via Serres).

It was also served by two long-distance trains between Thessaloniki and Alexandroupolis, but the service is currently suspended.

== Station layout ==
Ground level		Exit
Level; Ε1	Side platform, doors will open on the right/left
Level; Ε1	Platform 1A	T3 towards Thessaloniki (Metalliko) →
Level; Ε1	Platform 1B	T3 towards Alexandroupoli (Doirani) ←
