= 1937 Library (Swansea University) =

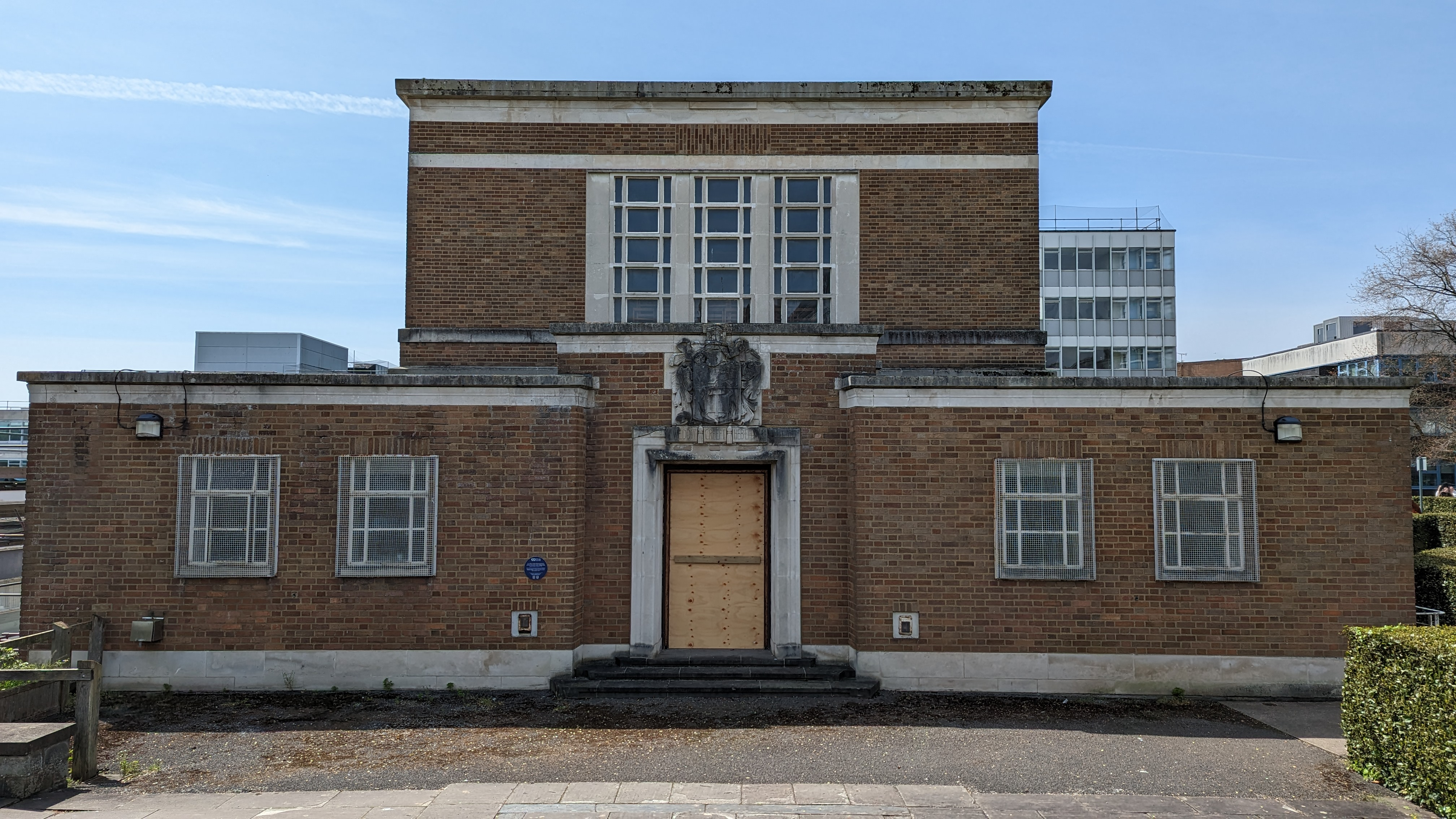
- 1937 Library

General information
- Type: Library
- Architectural style: Modern Movement
- Location: Swansea University
- Town or city: Swansea
- Country: Wales
- Coordinates: 51.610422°N 3.978090°W
- Opened: 19 October 1937

Design and construction
- Architect(s): Verner O. Rees

Website
- https://www.swansea.ac.uk/library/

The 1937 Library is a Grade II-listed Modern Movement library at Swansea University, Wales. It was built in the 1930s.

== History ==
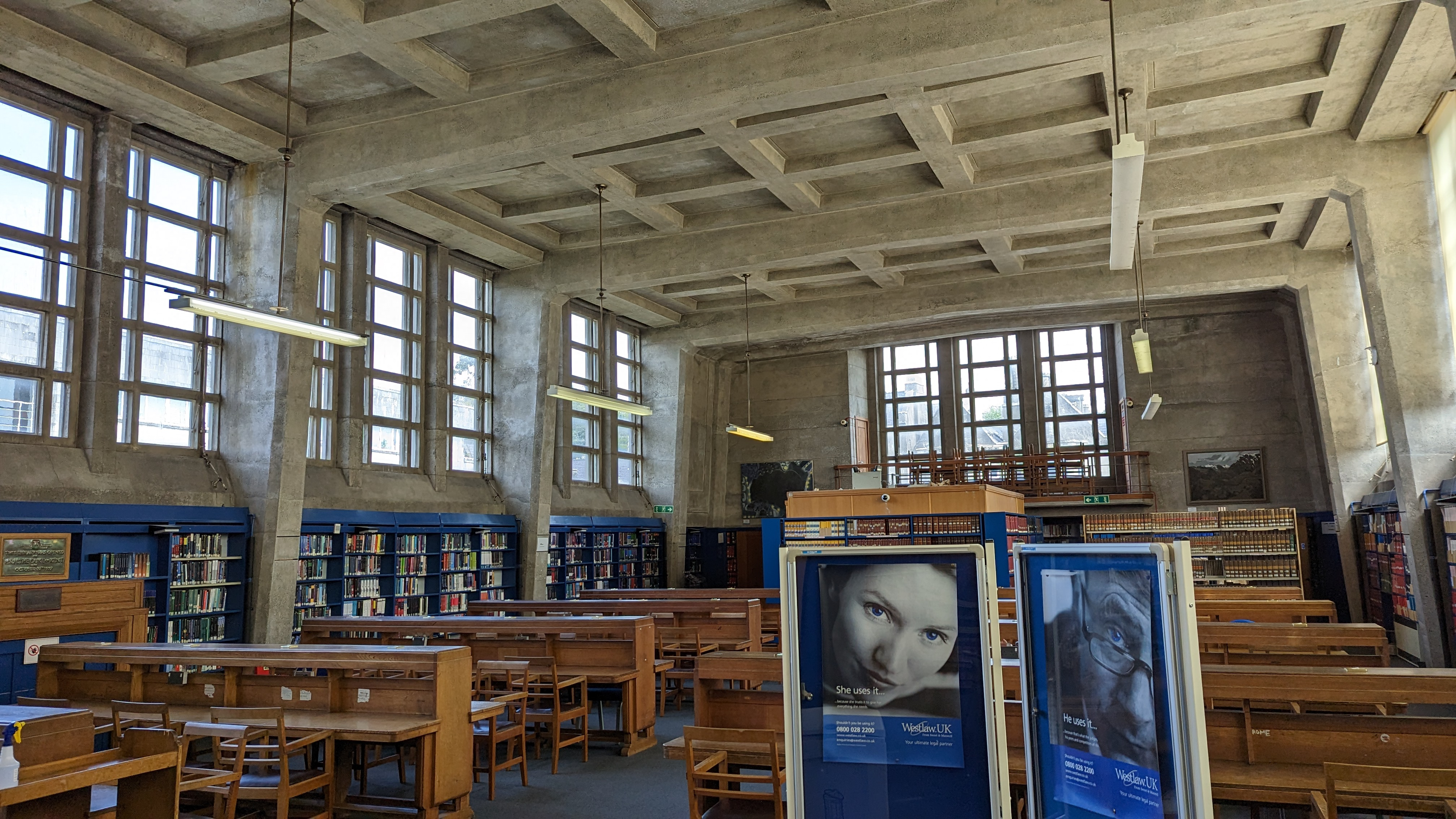
The 1937 Library Reading Room

With the growth of the University College of Swansea in the 1920s the old library based in Singleton Abbey was no longer suitable. A competition was held in 1934 and was won by the London architect Verner O. Rees who designed other university libraries including the now-demolished University of Birmingham Library which was constructed in 1959. The library was officially opened by the Duke of Kent on 19 October 1937. The university's foundation stone, which was put into storage after King George V laid it in 1920, was placed into the bricks of this new library.

The 1937 Library now forms the East wing of the much enlarged Library and Information Building complex which was designed by architects Sir Percy Thomas & Son in 1963. The library reading room has exposed concrete roof beams that now house the law library opened by Hon. Mr Justice John Thomas on 27 September 2001.

A public lecture by Andrew Green and an exhibition were held in 2017 to celebrate the 80th anniversary of the building's opening.

== Location ==
The 1937 Library is located on the Mall in Singleton Park, Swansea.

== Gallery ==
Swansea University Foundation Stone	Plaque Opening of 1937 Library at Swansea University	Plaque opening of Law Library at 1937 Library Swansea University
