= Doiran Memorial =

Commonwealth War Graves Commission war memorial

- Commonwealth War Graves Commission
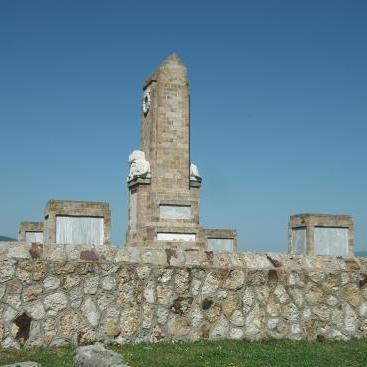
- Doiran Memorial
- For the British Salonika Army and their missing dead
- Unveiled: 25 September 1926
- Location: 41.1685°N 22.7623°E near Doirani, Greece
- Designed by: Robert Lorimer (architect); Walter Gilbert (sculptor)
- Commemorated: 2,171
- In glorious memory of 418 officers and 10,282 other ranks of the British Salonika Force who died in Macedonia and Serbia 1915–1918 and to commemorate 1,979 of all ranks who have no known grave but whose names are on the panels. They did their duty.

The Doiran Memorial is a Commonwealth War Graves Commission war memorial that is both a battlefield memorial and a memorial to the missing. It honours the dead of the British Salonika Force as well as commemorating by name the 2171 missing dead of that force who fell in fighting on the Macedonian front during the First World War in the period 1915–1918.

Located near the village of Doirani in Greece on the south-eastern shores of Lake Doiran, the memorial was placed near the border that then existed between Greece and Serbia, and which is now the border between Greece and North Macedonia. The memorial is near a CWGC cemetery called Doiran Military Cemetery and stands on a mound that was called Colonial Hill (the cemetery was originally called Colonial Hill Cemetery No.2). The location of the memorial is where fierce fighting took place in 1917 and 1918, see Battle of Doiran (1917) and Battle of Doiran (1918).

The memorial design by Commission architect Robert Lorimer features four square piers, each bearing name panels, placed to form a square around a central pylon that is some 40 feet (12 m) high, bearing the dedicatory inscriptions and two carved lions and stone wreaths. The sculptures are by Walter Gilbert. The cost of the memorial was largely paid for by subscriptions raised from the officers and men who served in the campaign.

The memorial, with the main inscriptions draped with British and Greek flags, was unveiled on 25 September 1926 by General Sir George Macdonogh, who represented the British Army. Guards of honour were provided by the Royal Navy (from the ship HMS Resolution) and the Greek Army. Representing the Commission was Sir Frederic Kenyon.

In his speech at the unveiling, Macdonogh conveyed the thoughts of Sir George Milne (commander of the British Salonika Force during the war) who had been unable to attend the unveiling. Macdonogh further stated that:

It was pleasant [...] to recall the many friendships formed in the days of the war and the esteem and affection in which [British troops] held the people and the Army of the fair land of Greece in which they fought and where so many were sleeping their last sleep.

— Sir George Macdonogh, 25 September 1926

The unveiling was followed by a British Marine band playing the hymn Abide with Me, buglers playing the Last Post, and a two-minute silence followed by the laying of wreaths by many representatives including Evzones soldiers laying a wreath on behalf of the President of Greece.

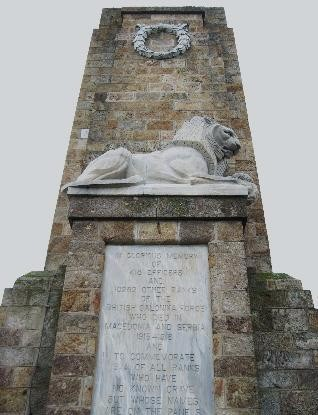
Carved wreath and lion, with the English inscription on the memorial's central pylon

The main inscription (which is given in both English and Greek) states:

In glorious memory of 418 officers and 10,282 other ranks of the British Salonika Force who died in Macedonia and Serbia 1915–1918 and to commemorate 1,979 of all ranks who have no known grave but whose names are on the panels. They did their duty.

— Doiran Memorial inscription

A large proportion of the non-missing dead referred to in the inscription died from diseases such as malaria and dysentry. An additional inscription (again in English and Greek) states: "The land on which this memorial stands, is the free gift of the Greek people for the perpetual commemoration of those of the British Salonika Force who fell in the war 1915–1918 and are honoured here."

In the years that followed, the memorial was visited by several pilgrimages, such as those tours (arranged by the St Barnabas Society) to the Salonika and Gallipoli battlefields. One such visit to the Doiran Memorial was reported in The Times in 1928.

The names of those commemorated on the Doiran Memorial were published by the Imperial War Graves Commission in 1929 in two volumes, forming number 37 in their memorial register series.

The Doiran Memorial underwent a full structural renovation in 2014, with the work including cleaning of the memorial and replacing and repairing stonework. The 97th anniversary of the end of the Salonika Campaign was marked on 27 September 2015 in a service "attended by members of the Greek Army, the Bulgarian Ministry of Defence and British military attachés".

== See also ==
- List of Commonwealth War Graves Commission World War I memorials to the missing
