= Verner Owen Rees =

British architect (1886–1966)

- Born: 1886
- Died: 7 November 1966 (aged 79–80); Parthenay, France
- Occupation: Architect
- Practice: Rees & Harvey
- Buildings: County Offices, Kendal; Soissons Memorial

Verner Owen Rees FRIBA (1886–1966) was a British Architect. He was an architectural partner with Frederick Milton Harvey at Rees & Harvey in London, UK.

Verner trained with Caroe & Passmore. Assistant to Lutyens 1910–12, then to New York. During the First World War he served in the Artist's Rifles. From 1921 to 1925 Verner taught at the Architectural Association School of Architecture in London and became Principal in 1929. He died in Parthenay, France on 7 November 1966.

== Work ==
He was responsible for the design of many buildings in the 1930s including County Offices, Kendal in 1939, the 1937 Library at Swansea University, the new London School of Hygiene & Tropical Medicine building with the entrance on Keppel Street opened in1929, the library wing to the north-east and garden wing of Aberdare Hall at Cardiff University, the 1950s library building at the University of Birmingham which has since been demolished, and worked on commissions for Soissons Memorial on behalf of the Commonwealth War Graves Commission. Verner also won the competition to design the new offices for Harrow Council but it was never completed and was the runner up in the competition to design the new RIBA building in 1932.

=== Written works ===
He authored the book The Plan Requirements of Modern Buildings and journal articles including Informal Architectural Notes on the Planning of University Libraries.

County Offices, Kendal	Soissons Memorial	1937 Library
Aberdare Hall, Cardiff University	London School of Hygiene & Tropical Medicine, Keppel Street	
