= Doirani railway station =

Station in Central Macedonia, Greece

Δοϊράνη Doirani
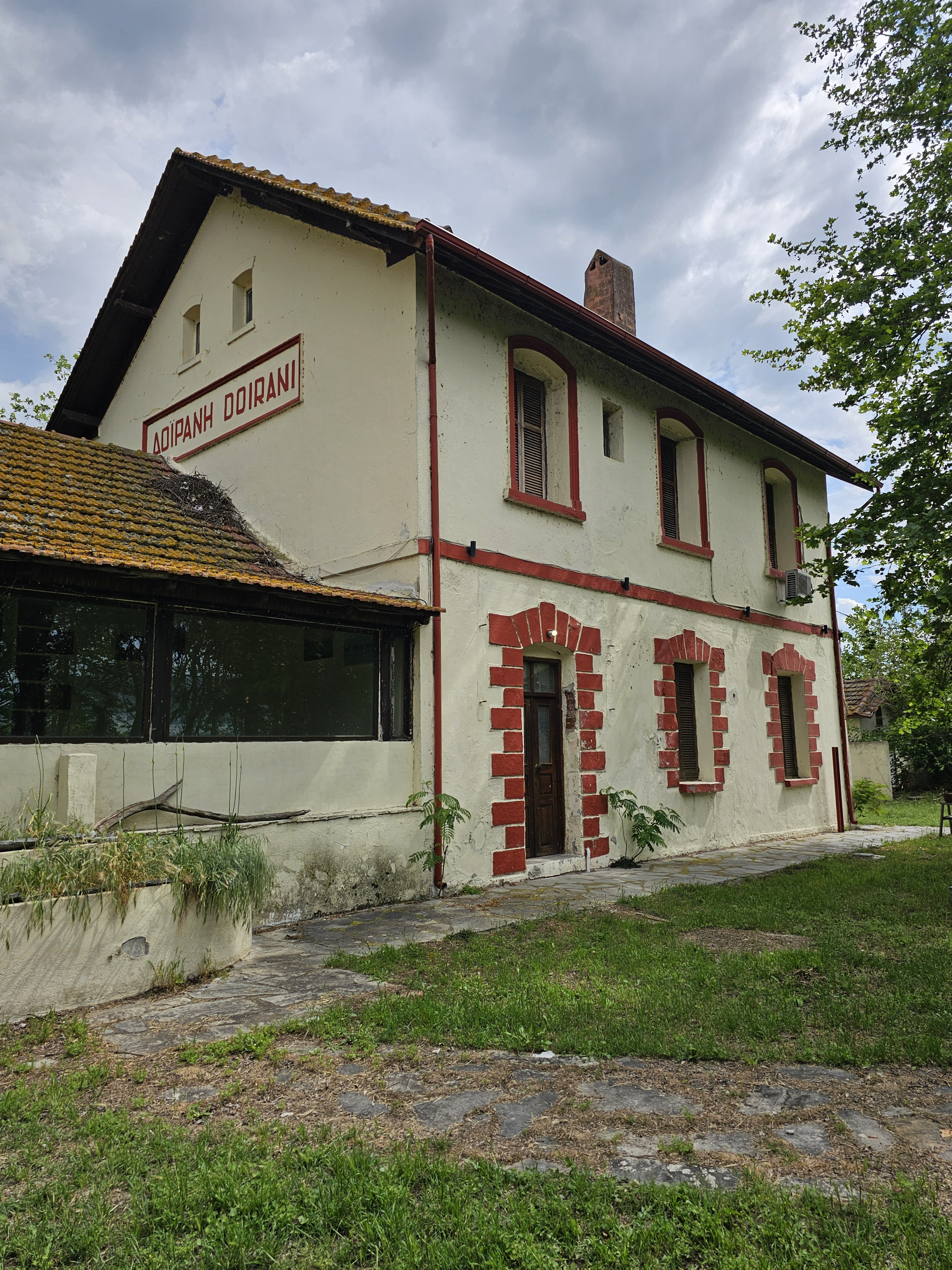
- The old Doirani railway station building, May 2024

General information
- Location: Kilkis 610 03, Kilkis; Greece
- Coordinates: 41°10′22″N 22°46′20″E
- Owner: GAIAOSE
- Line: Thessaloniki–Alexandroupolis railway
- Platforms: 1
- Tracks: 1
- Train operators: Hellenic Train
- Connections: Proastiakos

Construction
- Structure type: at-grade
- Platform levels: 1
- Parking: No
- Cycle facilities: No

Other information
- Status: unstaffed
- Website: http://www.ose.gr/en/

History
- Opened: 1896
- Closed: 1987
- Rebuilt: after 1987
- Electrified: No

Services
Preceding station	Regional Rail	Following station
Κalindia towards Thessaloniki	Line T3	Akrolimnio towards Drama
Suspended services
Preceding station	Hellenic Train	Following station
Chersos towards Thessaloniki	InterCity Thessaloniki–Alexandroupoli	Mouries towards Alexandroupoli
Chersos towards Thessaloniki	InterCity Thessaloniki–Serres	Mouries towards Serres
Location
- Location within Greece

Doirani railway station (Greek: Σιδηροδρομικός Σταθμός Δοϊράνης, romanized: Sidirodromikós stathmós Doïrani) is a railway station that serves the nearby town of Doirani, in Kilkis in Central Macedonia, Greece. The station is located 1.3 kilometres (0.81 mi) (15 Min walk) southeast of the settlement but still within the settlement limits. The station is located close to the Greek Military Cemetery of Doirani.

== History ==
The station opened in 1896 as part of the Salonica Monastir railway, built by the Enotikos Thessalonica-Istanbul Company Built in the French architectural style when the line was opened. The station, along with the vital railhead, was annexed by Greece on 18 October 1912 during the First Balkan War. In the summer (July–August) of 1913, during the final phase of the Second Balkan War, the station was looted by retreating Bulgarian troops.

On 17 October 1925, The Greek government purchased the Greek sections of the former Salonica Monastir railway, and the railway became part of the Hellenic State Railways, with the remaining section north of Florina seeded to Yugoslavia. On 20 August 1944, during the German Occupation, a German guard was attacked by ELAS forces. In 1970, OSE became the legal successor to the SEK, taking over responsibilities for most of Greece's rail infrastructure. On 1 January 1971, the station and most of the Greek rail infrastructure were transferred to the Hellenic Railways Organisation S.A., a state-owned corporation. The station closed in 1987 as it was not included in the design of the new Thessaloniki-Istanbul railway line. Freight traffic declined sharply when the state-imposed monopoly of OSE for the transport of agricultural products and fertilisers ended in the early 1990s. Many small stations of the network with little passenger traffic were closed down.

In 2001 the infrastructure element of OSE was created, known as GAIAOSE; it would henceforth be responsible for the maintenance of stations, bridges and other elements of the network, as well as the leasing and the sale of railway assists. In 2003, OSE launched "Proastiakos SA", as a subsidiary to serve the operation of the suburban network in the urban complex of Athens during the 2004 Olympic Games. In 2005, TrainOSE was created as a brand within OSE to concentrate on rail services and passenger interface.

On 9 September 2007, the station reopened. In 2008, all Proastiakos services were transferred from OSE to TrainOSE. In 2009, with the Greek debt crisis unfolding OSE's Management was forced to reduce services across the network. Timetables were cut back, and routes closed as the government-run entity attempted to reduce overheads. Services from Thessaloniki and Alexandroupolis were reduced from six to just two trains a day, reducing the reliability of services and passenger numbers. In 2017 OSE's passenger transport sector was privatised as TrainOSE, currently a wholly owned subsidiary of Ferrovie dello Stato Italiane infrastructure, including stations, remained under the control of OSE. Since 2020, the station has been served by the Thessaloniki Regional Railway (formerly the Suburban Railway).

In Early 2022 Minister of Infrastructure and Transport Costas Karamanlis, announced from 4 February, an additional route will be operated every day, calling at Mouries, Doirani, Hersos, Kristoni, Pedinou and Galliko Kilkis. In July 2022, the station began being served by Hellenic Train, the rebranded TranOSE The move was welcomed by the mayor of Serres, Alexandros Chrysafis.

In August 2025, the Greek Ministry of Infrastructure and Transport confirmed the creation of a new body, Greek Railways (Greek: Σιδηρόδρομοι Ελλάδος, romanized: Ellinikí Sidiródromi Monoprósopi) to assume responsibility for rail infrastructure, planning, modernisation projects, and rolling stock across Greece. Previously, these functions were divided among several state-owned entities: OSE, which managed infrastructure; ERGOSÉ, responsible for modernisation projects; and GAIAOSÉ, which owned stations, buildings, and rolling stock. OSE had overseen both infrastructure and operations until its vertical separation in 2005. Rail safety has been identified as a key priority. The merger follows the July approval of a Parliamentary Bill to restructure the national railway system, a direct response to the Tempi accident of February 2023, in which 43 people died after a head-on collision.

== Facilities ==
The old station building is a village landmark but is no longer used. It now houses a cafeteria and refreshment bar, however it is still owned by GEOSE A. E. The newer station building has recently been repaired and upgraded; however, it is closed. The single platform is unpaved; as of (2021) the station is unstaffed, with no staffed booking office and just simple waiting rooms. Access to the platforms is via crossing the lines. The platforms have no outside seating, Dot-matrix display departure and arrival screens or timetable poster boards for passenger information. The station remains little more than an unstaffed halt, subject to vandalism and neglect.

== Services ==
As of 12 May 2025, Line 3 of the Thessaloniki Regional Railway calls at this station: service is currently limited, with two trains per day to Thessaloniki (trains 1635 and 3633), one train per day to Serres (3632), and one train per day to Drama (1634, via Serres).

It was also served by two long-distance trains between Thessaloniki and Alexandroupolis, but the service is currently suspended.

== Station layout ==
Ground level		Exit
Level; Ε1	Side platform, doors will open on the right/left
Level; Ε1	Platform 1A	T3 towards Thessaloniki (Hersos) →
Level; Ε1	Platform 1B	T3 towards Alexandroupoli (Mouries) ←
