= List of Commonwealth War Graves Commission World War I memorials to the missing in Belgium and France =

The Commonwealth War Graves Commission (CWGC) aims to commemorate the UK and Commonwealth dead of the World Wars, either by maintaining a war grave in a cemetery, or where there is no known grave, by listing the dead on a memorial to the missing. This is a listing of those memorials maintained solely or jointly by the CWGC that commemorate by name the British and Commonwealth dead from the Western Front during World War I whose bodies were not recovered, or whose remains could not be identified. In addition to those listed here, there are numerous CWGC memorials to the missing from other battlefields around the world during the war, which are not listed here, most notably the memorials at Gallipoli, and the memorials to those lost at sea and in the air. There are also memorials to the missing from other combatant nations on the Western Front, especially those of Germany and France, but only the CWGC-maintained memorials are listed here.

Although listing the names of dead soldiers on memorials had started with the Boer Wars, this practice was only systematically adopted after World War I, with the establishment of the Imperial War Graves Commission, which was later renamed the Commonwealth War Graves Commission. Due to the rapid movement of forces in the early stages of the war, many of the casualties of the initial World War I battles had no known grave, and were instead commemorated after the war on 'memorials to the missing'. In later battles, the intensity of the fighting sometimes meant that bodies could not be recovered or identified until much later. The highest number of casualties occurred on the Western Front in France and Belgium. In total, over 20 separate CWGC or national memorials to the missing of the Western Front were designed and built. They were commissioned and unveiled over a period of around 15 years from the early 1920s to 1938, when the last of the planned memorials was unveiled. The numbers listed on the memorials reduces over time as remains are discovered, identified, and buried in a war grave, with the name removed from the memorial where it was listed, but over 300,000 war dead are still commemorated by these memorials to the missing.

== List of memorials ==
Commonwealth War Graves Commission (CWGC) World War I memorials in Belgium and France
Article and reference	Picture	Country	Location	Co-ordinates	Number listed	Description of those listed	Dates covered	Major battles	Date unveiled	Memorial designer	Memorial unveiled by
Thiepval Memorial CWGC		France	Thiepval	50°03′03.58″N 02°41′07.51″E	72,151	United Kingdom and South Africa	July 1916 to March 1918	Somme Offensive	1 August 1932	Edwin Lutyens	Edward, Prince of Wales
Menin Gate Memorial CWGC		Belgium	Ypres	50°51′07.27″N 02°53′27.80″E	54,343	Commonwealth nations, except New Zealand	October 1914 to 16 August 1917	Ypres Salient	24 July 1927	Reginald Blomfield	Lord Plumer
Tyne Cot Memorial CWGC		Belgium	Ypres	50°53′14.23″N 02°59′59.28″E	34,919	Commonwealth nations	16 August 1917 to September 1918	Ypres Salient	20 June 1927	Herbert Baker	Sir Gilbert Dyett
Arras Memorial CWGC		France	Arras	50°17′14.58″N 02°45′35.32″E	34,744	United Kingdom, South Africa and New Zealand	Spring of 1916 to 7 August 1918	Battle of Arras	31 July 1932	Edwin Lutyens	Lord Trenchard
Loos Memorial CWGC		France	Loos-en-Gohelle	50°27′37.98″N 02°46′17.05″E	20,585	Commonwealth nations except India and Canada	25 September 1915 to 11 November 1918	casualties in the area during and after the Battle of Loos	4 August 1930	Herbert Baker	Sir Nevil Macready
Pozières Memorial CWGC		France	Pozières	50°02′02.61″N 02°42′54.65″E	14,698	United Kingdom and South Africa	21 March 1918 to 7 August 1918	German spring offensive	4 August 1930	William Harrison Cowlishaw	Sir Horace Smith-Dorrien
Le Touret Memorial CWGC		France	Richebourg-l'Avoué	50°33′36.16″N 02°43′22.01″E	13,415	Commonwealth nations except India and Canada	1914 to 25 September 1915	casualties in the area prior to the Battle of Loos	22 March 1930	John Reginald Truelove	Lord Tyrrell
Ploegsteert Memorial CWGC		Belgium	Messines	50°44′16.41″N 02°52′56.35″E	11,347	United Kingdom and South Africa	October 1914 to September 1918	casualties in and around the Ypres Salient, not major offensives	7 June 1931	Harold Chalton Bradshaw	Leopold, Prince of Belgium
Vimy Memorial CWGC		France	Vimy	50°22′47.15″N 02°46′27.55″E	11,145	Canada	entire war, especially April 1917	several battles, especially the Battle of Vimy Ridge	26 July 1936	Walter Seymour Allward	Edward VIII
Villers-Bretonneux Memorial CWGC		France	Villers-Bretonneux	49°53′12.76″N 02°30′45.97″E	10,696	Australia	entire war, especially April 1918	several battles, especially the Second Battle of Villers-Bretonneux	22 July 1938	Edwin Lutyens	King George VI
Vis-en-Artois Memorial CWGC		France	Vis-en-Artois	50°14′46.56″N 02°57′00.47″E	9,815	United Kingdom and South Africa	8 August 1918 to 11 November 1918	Advance to Victory	4 August 1930	John Reginald Truelove	Rt. Hon. Thomas Shaw
Cambrai Memorial CWGC		France	Cambrai	50°08′13.12″N 03°00′55.04″E	7,115	United Kingdom and South Africa	November and December 1917	Battle of Cambrai	4 August 1930	Harold Chalton Bradshaw	Lieutenant-General Sir Louis Vaughan
Neuve-Chapelle Memorial CWGC		France	Neuve-Chapelle	50°34′31.31″N 02°46′29.21″E	4,653	India	entire war	several battles	7 October 1927	Herbert Baker	Earl of Birkenhead
Soissons Memorial CWGC		France	Soissons	49°22′52.32″N 03°19′44.18″E	3,910	United Kingdom	May 1918 to August 1918	Third Battle of the Aisne and Second Battle of the Marne	22 July 1928	Gordon H. Holt and Verner Owen Rees	Sir Alexander Hamilton-Gordon
La Ferté-sous-Jouarre memorial CWGC		France	La Ferté-sous-Jouarre	48°56′37.43″N 03°07′26.72″E	3,740	United Kingdom	August 1914 to October 1914	Battle of Mons, First Battle of the Marne and the aftermaths	4 November 1928	George Hartley Goldsmith	Sir William Pulteney Pulteney
Fromelles Memorial CWGC		France	Fromelles	50°37′10.50″N 02°50′01.32″E	1,167	Australia	July 1916	Battle of Fromelles	not specified	Herbert Baker	not specified
Longueval Memorial CWGC		France	Longueval	50°01′32.44″N 02°47′29.98″E	1,205	New Zealand	July 1916 to November 1916	Battle of the Somme	not specified	Herbert Baker	not specified
Arras Flying Services Memorial CWGC		France	Arras	50°17′14.58″N 02°45′35.32″E	978	Airmen of the RNAS, the RFC, and the RAF	entire war	aerial missions	31 July 1932	Edwin Lutyens	Lord Trenchard
Messines Ridge Memorial CWGC		Belgium	Messines	50°45′54.31″N 02°53′26.59″E	828	New Zealand	1917 and 1918	Battle of Messines	not specified	Charles Holden	not specified
Beaumont-Hamel Memorial CWGC		France	Beaumont-Hamel	50°04′26.00″N 02°38′53.75″E	808	Dominion of Newfoundland	entire war, especially 1 July 1916	entire war, especially Battle of the Somme	7 June 1925	Basil Gotto	Earl Haig
Nieuport Memorial CWGC		Belgium	Nieuport	51°08′13.64″N 02°45′20.20″E	552	United Kingdom	1914 and July 1917	Siege of Antwerp and gas attacks at Nieuport	1 July 1928	William Bryce Binnie	Sir George Macdonogh
Grevillers Memorial CWGC		France	Grévillers	50°06′32.75″N 02°49′10.69″E	446	New Zealand	21 March 1918 to 11 November 1918	German spring offensive and the Advance to Victory	not specified	Edwin Lutyens	not specified
Polygon Wood Memorial CWGC		Belgium	Zonnebeke	50°51′20.16″N 02°59′29.07″E	378	New Zealand	September 1917 to May 1918	trench deaths in the Ypres Salient and the Battle of Polygon Wood	not specified	Charles Holden	not specified
Cite Bonjean Memorial CWGC		France	Armentières	50°41′09.71″N 02°51′48.46″E	47	New Zealand	mostly 1918	battles around Armentières, including the German spring offensive	not specified	Herbert Baker	not specified
Noyelles-sur-Mer Memorial CWGC		France	Noyelles-sur-Mer	50°11′11.04″N 01°43′21.51″E	39	Chinese Labour Corps	1917 and 1918	Labour support behind the frontline	not specified	Edwin Lutyens	not specified
Marfaux Memorial CWGC		France	Marfaux	49°09′52.70″N 03°54′13.00″E	10	New Zealand Cyclist Battalion	July 1918	town lost and retaken during the German spring offensive	not specified	N/A	not specified
Zeebrugge Memorial CWGC		Belgium	Zeebrugge	51°19′56.09″N 03°12′26.57″E	4	three officers and one mechanic of the Royal Navy	23 April 1918	Zeebrugge Raid	not specified	N/A	not specified
Delville Wood Memorial CWGC		France	Longueval	50°01′30.50″N 02°48′45.36″E	none	South Africa	entire war	Battle of Delville Wood	10 October 1926	Herbert Baker	widow of Louis Botha

The total number of names inscribed on the memorials listed here, according to the CWGC figures given above (12 March 2026), is 313,738.

== National memorials ==
Some memorials were organised by nation, rather than by battlefield. United Kingdom and South African forces are named on the memorials designated for the areas where they fell. The South African national memorial at Delville Wood has no names inscribed on it, as the names are listed on the battlefield memorials instead. The other Commonwealth nations have national memorials dedicated to their missing who fell on the Western Front: the Neuve-Chapelle Memorial to the forces of India; the Vimy Memorial to the forces of Canada and the Beaumont-Hamel Memorial to the forces of Newfoundland; the Villers-Brettonneux Memorial to the forces of Australia; and the Messines Ridge Memorial to the forces of New Zealand (the latter is one of seven memorials on the Western Front dedicated to New Zealanders). The missing war dead of Ireland, at the time of the war still part of the United Kingdom, are numbered among the UK forces (as were English, Scottish and Welsh troops) and listed with them on the memorials. The main memorials to the Irish war dead, one in France and one in Belgium, are the Ulster Tower and the Island of Ireland Peace Park, unveiled in 1921 and 1998 respectively.

- Delville Wood Memorial (South Africa)
- Vimy Memorial (Canada)
- Villers-Bretonneux Memorial (Australia)
- Neuve-Chapelle Memorial (India)
- Beaumont-Hamel Memorial (Newfoundland)
- Messines Ridge Memorial (New Zealand)

== See also ==
- List of Commonwealth War Graves Commission World War II memorials to the missing
- Canadian First World War Memorials In Europe (template listing)
