= Dunkirk Memorial =

Commonwealth War Graves Commission memorial

- Commonwealth War Graves Commission
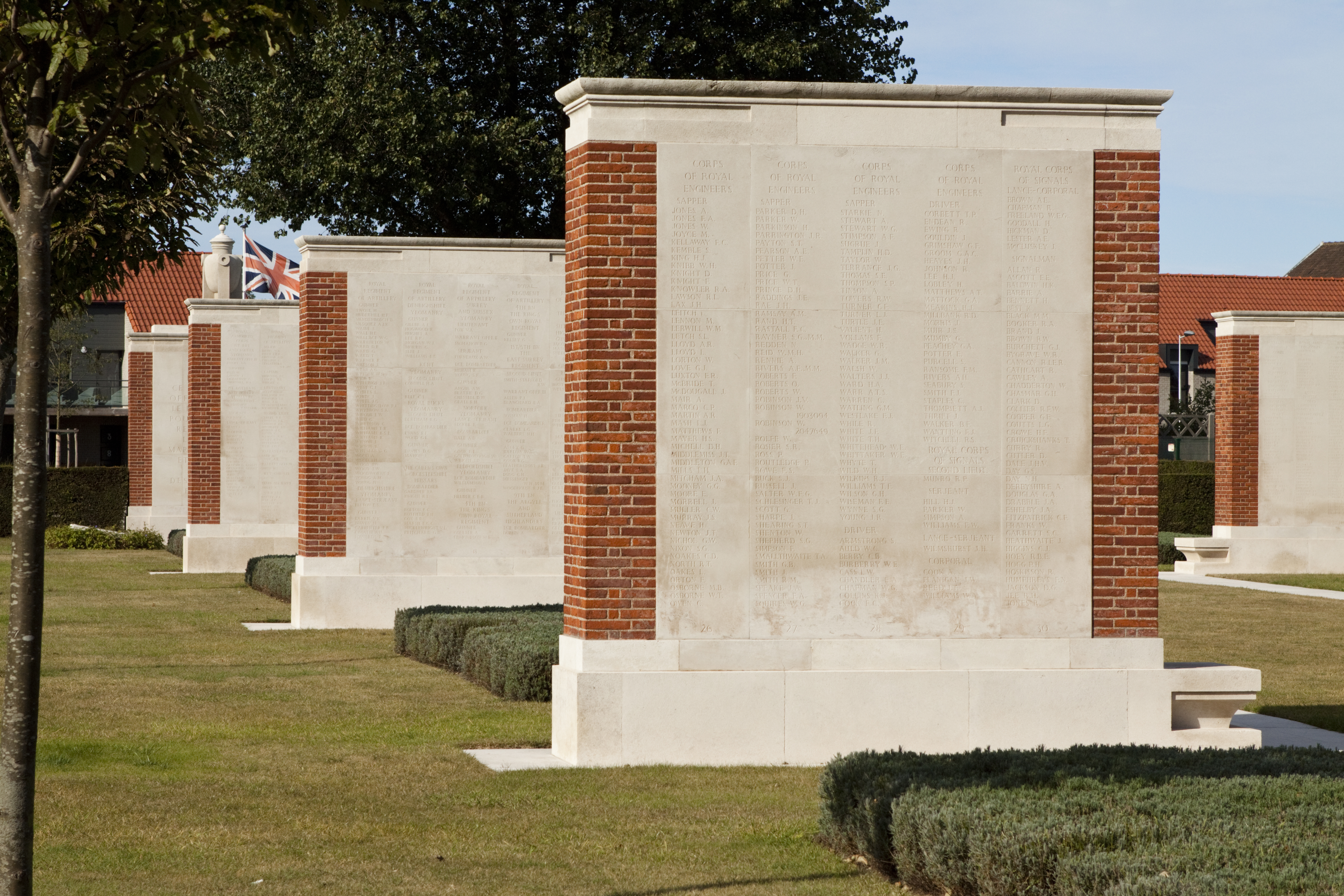
- One of the rows of screen walls making up the memorial
- For the missing of the British Expeditionary Force
- Unveiled: 29 June 1957
- Location: 51.0303°N 2.3897°E; Dunkirk, France
- Designed by: Philip Hepworth (architect); John Hutton (glass engraver)
- Commemorated: 4,505
- English: Here beside the graves of their comrades are commemorated the soldiers of the British Expeditionary Force who fell in the campaign of 1939–1940 and have no known grave. French: Ici à côté des tombes de leurs camarades sont commémorés les soldats du corps expéditionnaire britannique morts au cours de la campagne 1939–1940 et qui n'ont pas de tombe connue.

The Dunkirk Memorial is a Commonwealth War Graves Commission memorial to the missing that commemorates 4,505 missing dead of the British Expeditionary Force (BEF), most of whom fell prior to and during the Battle of Dunkirk in 1939 and 1940, in the fall of France during the Second World War.

Located in the town cemetery of Dunkirk, France, the design by Commission architect Philip Hepworth features memorial panels, a shrine in the form of a shelter, and an engraved glass pane by John Hutton. Those commemorated include soldiers lost on ships sunk during the evacuation, as well as a recipient of the Victoria Cross.

The memorial was completed some 17 years after the events it marks. It was unveiled by Queen Elizabeth The Queen Mother in 1957, in front of visiting dignitaries, and hundreds of veterans and relatives of those who died. Later commemorations held here include the 75th anniversary in 2015.

== Background ==
The Battle of Dunkirk consisted of the defence of and evacuation of Allied forces from Dunkirk, resisting and evading capture by the invading German forces. The battle was part of the larger Battle of France campaign during the Second World War, with the British Army forces consisting of the British Expeditionary Force (BEF). The BEF dead are commemorated by the Commonwealth War Graves Commission (CWGC), with those whose died with no known grave being commemorated on the Dunkirk Memorial. The period covered is that prior to and during the Battle of Dunkirk, from September 1939 to June 1940. The memorial also commemorates those from that battle who died later in captivity and who have no known grave.

== Location and design ==
The memorial forms the entrance to one of the CWGC sections of Dunkirk Town Cemetery in Dunkirk, France. Either side of the entrance gates are the inscription panels in English and French, surmounted by stone urns. There are 4,505 names listed on the memorial, which takes the form of free-standing Portland stone screen walls in two rows either side of an avenue leading to a shrine which includes a glass pane (18 ft × 9 ft (5.5 m × 2.7 m)) engraved with scenes from the evacuation. Further screen walls are attached to the shrine, at the centre of which is a circular wooden seating area integrated with the cabinet containing the CWGC cemetery and memorial register.

The design for the memorial was produced by Philip Hepworth, the Principal Architect for France for the Imperial War Graves Commission (later the Commonwealth War Graves Commission), while the glass engraving was by New Zealand-born engraver John Hutton. The horticultural design included a holly hedge, and English herbaceous and flowering border plants such as stocks, thymes, primroses, phlox, heathers, and violas.

== Unveiling and dedication ==
The memorial was unveiled on 29 June 1957 by Queen Elizabeth The Queen Mother. The Queen Mother travelled to France on HMS Chieftain. Also attending the ceremony were the Duke of Gloucester (President of the Imperial War Graves Commission), Sir Gladwyn Jebb (the British Ambassador to France), General Jean Ganeval (representing René Coty the President of France), Mayor Paul Asseman (the Mayor of Dunkirk), Field-Marshal Sir Gerald Templer (the Chief of the Imperial General Staff), and representatives of Empire (later Commonwealth) nations. Some 1600 veterans and relatives of those commemorated were at the unveiling, part of a pilgrimage to the memorial unveiling that had been organised by the Royal British Legion.

In her address to the crowd, the Queen Mother declared:

To-day we pay our tribute to the undying memory of all those brave men, soldiers, sailors, and airmen, who died in the hour of seeming defeat in order that in the fullness of time it could be turned to victory. Many of them rest in honoured graves, tended by skilled and reverent hands, others in the swaying fortunes of swift battle lay where they fell, and have no known resting place. They are commemorated in this beautiful setting amid the scent of English flowers in a comradeship of 4,700 gallant soldiers.

— Queen Elizabeth The Queen Mother, 29 June 1957

The memorial panels were veiled with Union Flags, with a roll of drums accompanying the unveiling of each panel. The "Last Post" was played, as well as "Lochaber No More" (played on bagpipes). The religious service included a dedication of the memorial by the Chaplain-General to the Forces Victor Pike, prayers by the Principal Roman Catholic Chaplain, Monsignor Bernard Navin, and the singing of "Land of Hope and Glory". The guards of honour were provided by the Grenadier Guards and the French 33rd Infantry Regiment. Naval tribute was paid with a gun salute from the ships offshore, and the Royal Air Force salute was given by a flypast from a Hawker Hurricane fighter aircraft.

Wreaths were laid at the memorial by the Queen Mother and other dignitaries, with a wreath also laid on behalf of Sir Winston Churchill. Hundreds of wreaths were then laid by the pilgrims, including one laid by Sir Ian Fraser, President of the Royal British Legion. On the return voyage by HMS Chieftain, the Queen Mother cast a wreath into the sea off the Dunkirk beaches.

== Casualties commemorated ==
Those named on the memorial include BEF servicemen who died on SS Abukir, a British steamship that was torpedoed and sunk in the North Sea while evacuating Ostend on the last day of the Battle of Belgium. The missing military personnel lost when the RMS Lancastria was sunk are also commemorated on this memorial. Among the individuals named on the memorial are Victoria Cross-recipient Lieutenant Christopher Furness, and army chaplain Leslie Philip Riches.

== Later history ==
The 75th anniversary of the Dunkirk evacuation was marked at the Dunkirk Memorial on 22 May 2015, in a commemorative event organised by Dunkirk Town and attended by HRH Prince Michael of Kent. Primary school children from the local area sang the French and British national anthems while dressed in the colours of the French tricolour flag. The service at the memorial was led by Royal Navy chaplain Gordon Warren who said:

Whilst we thank God this weekend for those wartime miracles during the evacuation, let us never forget the precious souls who are commemorated here and who never came back. We will remember them.

— Royal Navy chaplain Gordon Warren, 23 May 2015

== Architectural features ==
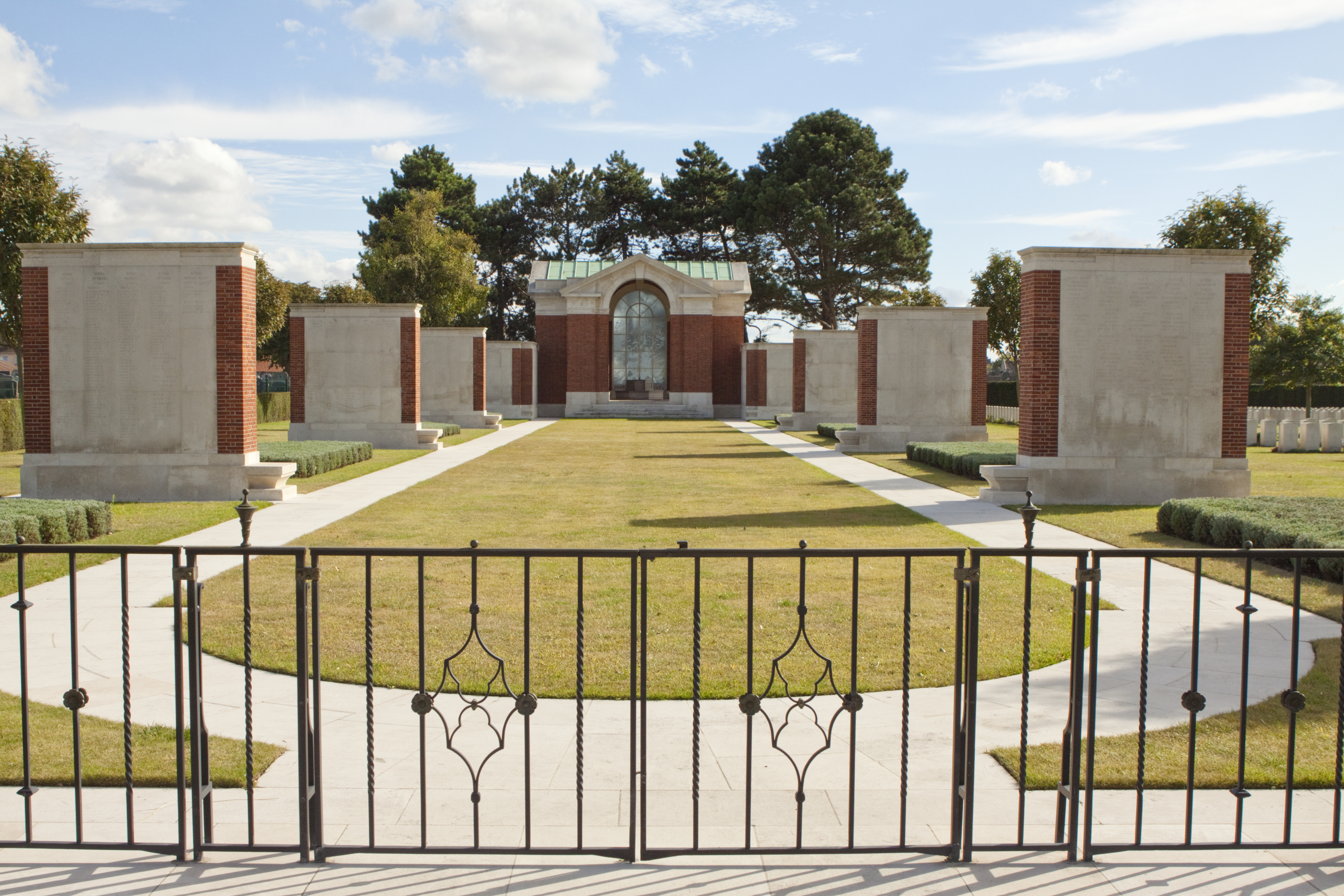
Entrance gates, memorial avenue and shrine

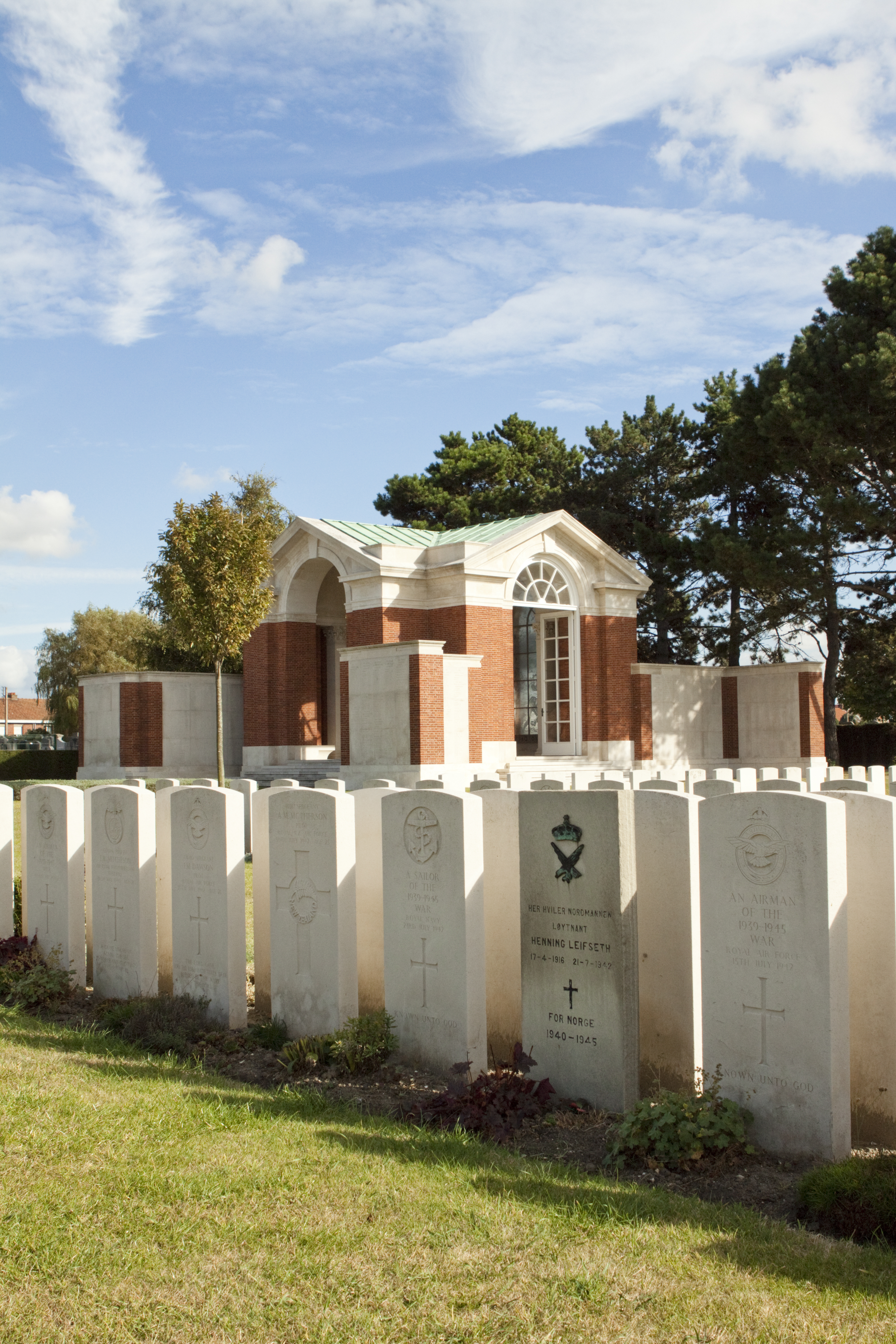
War graves adjacent to the memorial

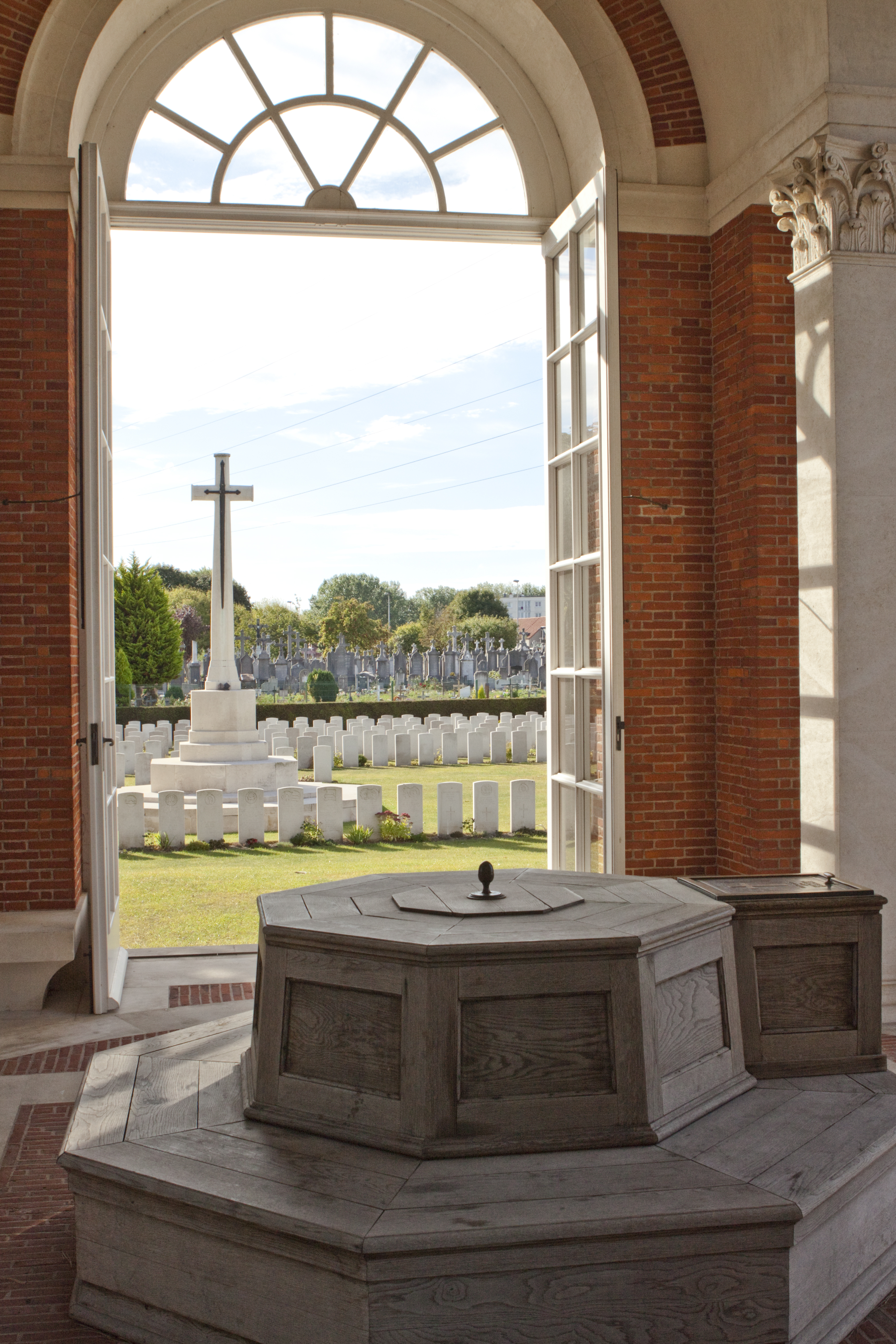
Shrine seating and Cross of Sacrifice

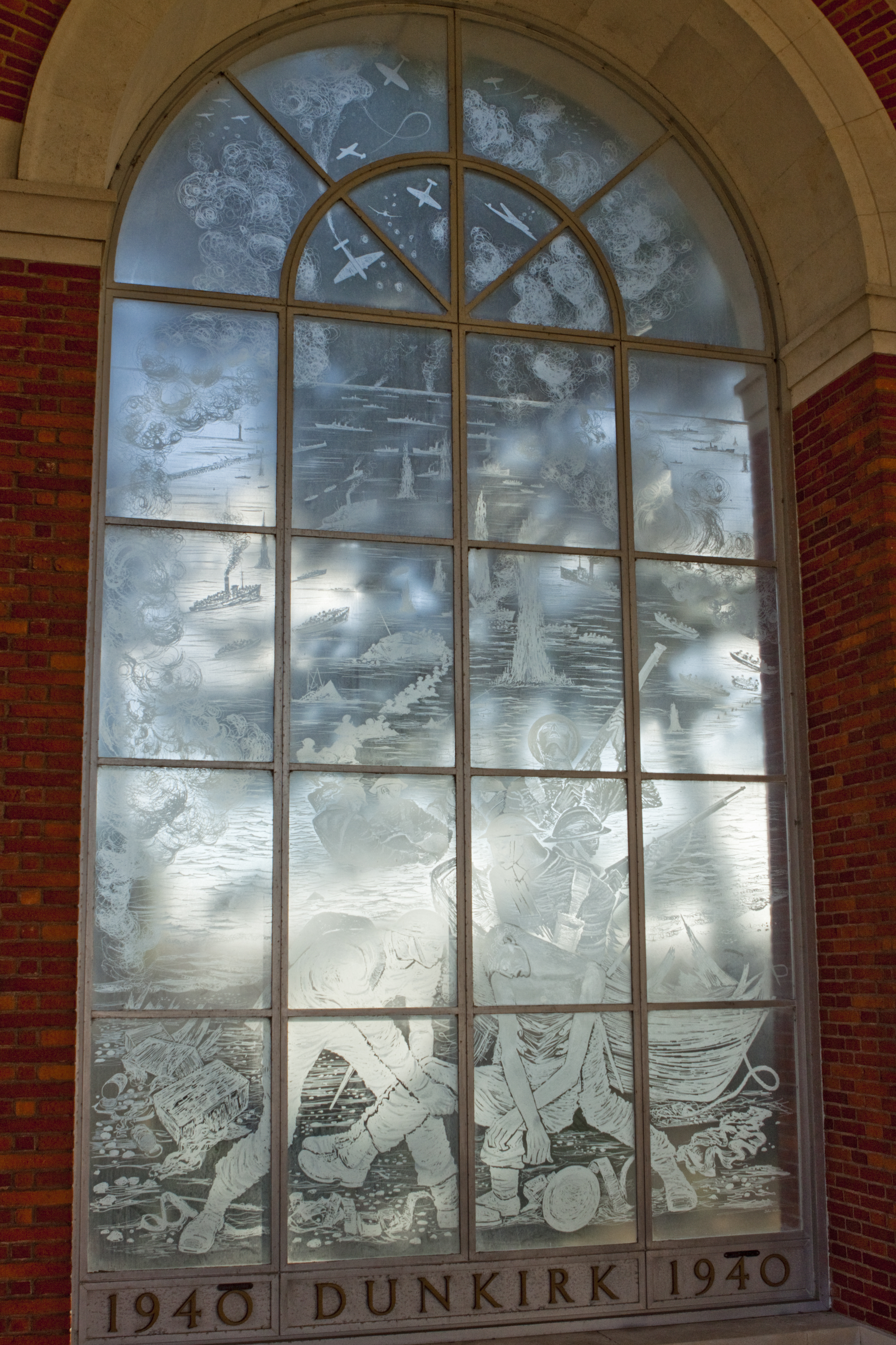
Engraved glass memorial pane of the evacuation

== See also ==
- List of Commonwealth War Graves Commission World War II memorials to the missing
