= Soissons Memorial =

World War I memorial in France

- British Memorial, France
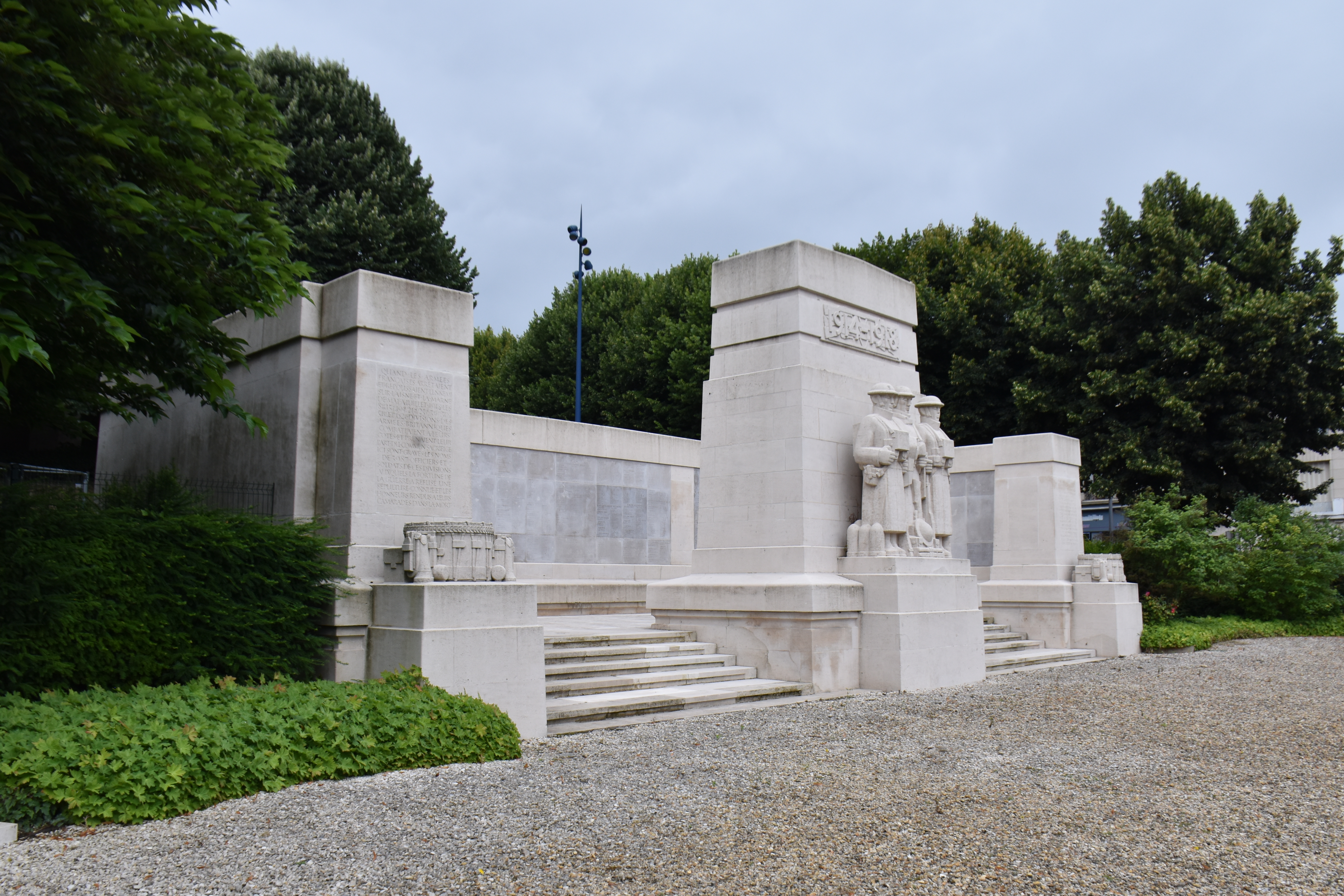
- For forces of the United Kingdom
- Unveiled: 22 July 1928
- Location: 49°22′52.32″N 03°19′44.18″E
- Designed by: G. H. Holt and V. O. Rees (design); Eric Kennington (sculptor)

The Soissons Memorial is a World War I memorial located in the town of Soissons, in the Aisne département of France. The memorial lists 3,987 names of British soldiers with no known grave who were killed in the area from May to August 1918 during the German spring offensive. The battles fought by those commemorated here include the Third Battle of the Aisne and the Second Battle of the Marne.

In August 1914, the British Expeditionary Force crossed the Aisne River two kilometres west of Soissons, and re-crossed it in September. For the next three and a half years, this part of the front was held by French forces and the city remained within the range of German artillery. In April 1918, five divisions of Commonwealth forces (IX Corps) were posted to the French 6th Army here. At the end of May, they faced an overwhelming German attack which pushed the Allies back across the Aisne to the Marne. Having suffered 15,000 fatal casualties, IX Corps was withdrawn in July, and was replaced by XXII Corps, which took part in the Allied counter-attack that, by August, drove back the Germans and recovered the lost ground.

The memorial's inscription reads: "When the French Armies held and drove back the enemy from the Aisne and the Marne between May and July 1918 the 8th, 15th, 19th, 21st, 25th, 34th, 50th, 51st and 62nd divisions of the British Armies served in the line with them and shared the common sacrifice. Here are recorded the names of 3,987 officers and men of those divisions to whom the fortune of war denied the known and honoured burial given to their comrades in death."

This is a free-standing memorial (one without an associated cemetery) constructed in Portland stone. It was designed by G. H. Holt and V. O. Rees with sculpture by Eric Kennington. The memorial was unveiled on 22 July 1928 by Sir Alexander Hamilton-Gordon. Hamilton-Gordon was a general in World War I, commanding IX Corps from 1916 onwards, and was commander of this corps during the Third Battle of the Aisne, which is commemorated here. For security reasons, the gates of this memorial are permanently locked.

== See also ==
- List of Commonwealth War Graves Commission World War I memorials to the missing in Belgium and France
