= Rozoy =

Rozoy is part of the name of several communes in France:

- Rozoy-le-Vieil in Loiret
- Chéry-lès-Rozoy in Aisne
- Grand-Rozoy in Aisne
- Rozoy-Bellevalle in Aisne
- Rozoy-sur-Serre in Aisne
