= Doirani =

Town in Central Macedonia, Greece

Doirani Δοϊράνη
- Municipal unit
- Location within the regional unit

- Location within Greece
- Coordinates: 41°10′40″N 22°45′40″E
- Country: Greece
- Administrative region: Central Macedonia
- Regional unit: Kilkis
- Municipality: Kilkis

Area
  - Municipal unit: 81.2 km^{2} (31.4 sq mi)
- Elevation: 160 m (520 ft)

Population (2021)
  - Municipal unit: 1,022
  - Municipal unit density: 12.6/km^{2} (32.6/sq mi)
- Time zone: UTC+2 (EET)
  - Summer (DST): UTC+3 (EEST)
- Postal code: 61003
- Vehicle registration: ΚΙ

Doirani (Greek: Δοϊράνη) is a town and former municipality in the Kilkis regional unit, Greece. Since the 2011 local government reform it is part of the municipality Kilkis, of which it is a municipal unit. It is situated on the shores of Doiran Lake, which marks the border between Greece and North Macedonia. The municipal unit has an area of 81.213 km^{2} (31.4 sq mi). It had a population of 1,022 according to the 2021 census. It is the Greek part of the former municipality of Doyuran, which was divided in 1913 by the new borders created between Greece and what was then Serbia. The part on the other side of the border is called Dojran. The name comes from the ancient name Doviros.

== Geography ==
Doirani is located on the southwestern shores of Lake Doirani, on the border between Greece and North Macedonia. Its name is due to the lake of the same name, which may be the same as the ancient "Lake of Prasia" mentioned by Herodotus. It is 23 kilometres (14.3 mi) from Kilkis and 69 kilometres (42.9 mi) north of Thessaloniki, on an Elevation of 160m (520 ft). On the beach of the lake, there are refreshment stands, picturesque fish taverns, playgrounds and other sports facilities for visitors. The village has a customs office, an EOT office and a currency exchange.

== History ==
In ancient times, the area was inhabited by the Dovires Paiones, from where the name of the lake comes, as the lake of the Dobirs, the Dobirani lake, and finally from a corruption "Doirani". The village is mentioned in 1919, in Official Gazette 167A-30/07/1919 under the name Doirani Railway Station to be annexed to the then community of Sourlovou (Amaranton) which belonged to the prefecture of Thessaloniki. In the area and during the Second Balkan War on 23 June 1913, the battle of the same name was fought between Greeks and Bulgarians. The day after the battle of Kilkis, Greek troops attacked the Bulgarians and captured the railway station and the then-town, which was a substantial supply base for them.

Doirani was the site of much Greek-Bulgarian inter-ethnic fighting during the Macedonian Struggle in the early 20th century. Konstantinos Papagiannakis from Doirani was the most prominent Greek Macedonian fighter in the area. The lake also formed the southernmost line of the Macedonian front of World War I and its southern shore was the scene of yet another battle, this time between the allied Greek and British troops, attacking from the south, and the Bulgarian troops who were to the east of the lake.

In 1934 it was annexed to the newly founded prefecture of Kilkis, and in 1940 its name was corrected to Doirani. In 1997 it was designated the seat of the municipality of the same name. According to the Kallikratis program, together with Drasato and Korifi they form the local community of Drosato, which belongs to the Doirani municipal unit of the municipality of Kilkis and according to the 2011 census, it has a population of 83 inhabitants. Today, on a hill a few hundred meters south of the lake, there is a monument to the battle and two cemeteries for the Greek and British soldiers.

== Economy ==
=== Tourism ===
In the village, there is a Museum of Natural History which was created in collaboration with the Municipality of Doirani, the Goulandris Museum of Natural History and the Greek Center for Wetland Habitats with the aim of informing and raising awareness about the lake's wetland ecosystems. It is housed in a newly built building with traditional architecture on the outside, but on the inside, it has modern exhibitions with screens, photos of birds and plants, maps related to the existing wetlands in Greece, as well as thematic sections on the flora, fauna and the life of fishermen in the wider area.

North-east of the village and next to the shores of the lake, in the Thousand Trees location, there is a lakeside forest of oaks, plane trees and firs, which since 2009 has been designated a Preserved Natural Monument. The entire Doirani lake is a very important wetland that has been designated a Natura habitat and is included in the Special Protection Zones, as it provides temporary shelter to 36 rare species of birds. On the borderline in the military outpost of Doirani is the church of Saints Cyril and Methodius, which is under the care of the Metropolis of Polyani and Kilkisi.

== Transport ==
=== Rail transport ===
The settlement is served by Doirani railway station on the Thessaloniki-Alexandroupoli line, with daily services to Thessaloniki and Alexandroupolis.

== Notable people ==
Yannis Grosis, Greek Singer.

== Gallery ==
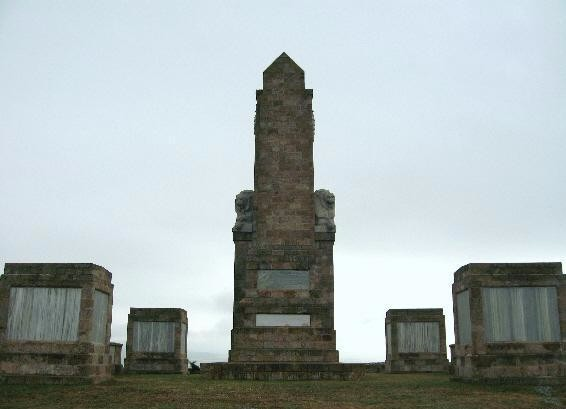
A view of WWI Doiran Memorial

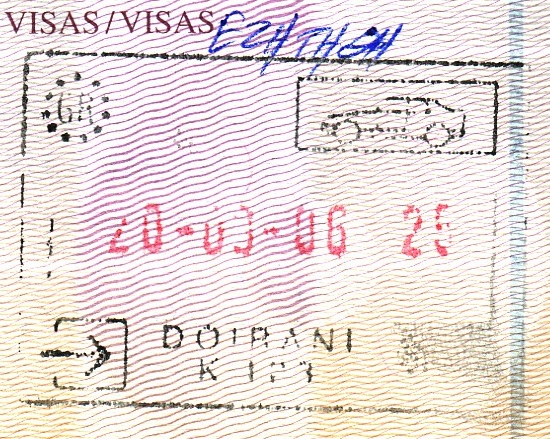
Schengen entry stamp into Greece from Doirani

== See also ==
- Old Doirani, the Byzantine Polyani, a historic town with a dynamic Greek element until the beginning of the 20th century, and today lies in Macedonia.
