= Freetown Memorial =

War memorial in Sierra Leone

- Commonwealth War Graves Commission
- For Soldiers from Sierra Leone who died whilst serving with the Royal West African Frontier Force in West Africa and whose graves are not known
- Location: near Freetown, Sierra Leone
- Commemorated: 1356

The Freetown Memorial is a Commonwealth War Graves Commission war memorial located outside the Secretariate Building in Freetown, Sierra Leone. The memorial generally commemorates Soldiers from Sierra Leone who died whilst serving with the Royal West African Frontier Force in West Africa and whose graves are not known. The Freetown Memorial commemorates 1,109 First World War casualties and 247 from the Second World War.

West Africans who died whilst serving with the Royal West African Frontier Force in West Africa are commemorated by name on memorials in the countries of their enlistment. The Secretariat Building in Freetown was at one time the hub of colonial government in Sierra Leone.
