= Taukkyan =

Village in Yangon Region, Myanmar

Htauk Kyant ထောက်ကြန့်
- Town
- Location in Burma
- Coordinates: 17°02′29″N 96°08′02″E
- Country: Burma
- Region: Yangon Region
- District: Northern District of Yangon
- Township: Mingaladon Township
- Time zone: UTC+6.30 (MST)

Htauk Kyant (Burmese: ထောက်ကြန့်, MLCTS: htaukkran. IPA: /tʰauʔt͡ʃa̰N/) is a village in Mingaladon Township, Northern District of Yangon, in the Yangon Region of Myanmar.

Htauk Kyant War Cemetery is in the Town located beside Yangon - Pyay road.
