= Timeline of ancient Greece =

This is a timeline of ancient Greece from its emergence around 800 BC to its subjection to the Roman Empire in 146 BC.

For earlier times, see Greek Dark Ages, Aegean civilizations and Mycenaean Greece. For later times see Roman Greece, Byzantine Empire and Ottoman Greece.

For modern Greece after 1820, see Timeline of modern Greek history.

== Archaic Period (785–481 BC) ==
- 777: Cumae is founded by Chalcis
- 776: Traditional date for the first historic Olympic games.
- 757: The First Messenian War starts. (Date disputed by Jerome, Pausanias and Diodorus; this estimate is based on a reading of Diodorus' Spartan king lists and Pausanias' description of the war).
- 756: Kyzikus is settled by Ionians
- 754: Polydorus becomes king of Sparta.
- 753: Athens: Office of Archon reduced to 10 years. Members of the ruling family to possess the office starting with Charops. (Dating based on Pausanias).
- 743: Rhegion is founded by Euboeans
- 740: Zancle is founded by Euboeans
- 738: Alternative date for the end of the First Messenian War.
- 737: Rhegion and Zancle join in union under Zancle
- 735: Perdiccas I of Macedon flees from Argos to Macedonia and conquers the land.
- 734:
  - Polydorus sends colonists to Italy
  - Syracuse is founded by Korinthians and Teneans
  - Kerkyra is founded by Korinthians
- 733:
  - Naxos (Sicily) is founded by Euboeans
  - Troliton is founded by Megarans
- 732: Euboea splits between Chalcis and Eretria due to disputes
- 731:
  - Sigeion is founded by Mytilene
  - Catania is founded by Chalcidians
- 730:
  - Leontini is founded by Naxos and controlled by the tyrant Euarchus
  - Troliton is abandoned and settlers settled in Leontini
- 728: Troliton settlers are ostracized from Leontini and settle Thapsos
- 727–717: Hippomenes, archon of Athens, kills his daughter's adulterer by yoking him to his chariot and then locks his daughter Leimone in with a horse until she dies. (Pausanias and Aristotle).
- c. 725: Lelantine War between Chalcis and Eretria. Many Greek cities are allied with one or the other. Dates before this time uncertain.
- 725: Thapsos abandoned and Megara Hyblaea is settled by the Thapsos settlers
- 720s/710s Droughts on Euboea
- 720:
  - Korinth removes the Liburnians from Kerkyra
  - Sybaris is founded by Achaeans from Helice
- 719: Polydorus, King of Sparta, is murdered by Polymarchus.
- 716:
  - Mylae is founded and annexed by Zancle
  - According to legend: The reign of the Heraklids over Lydia is ended when Candaules, known as Myrsilus to the Greeks, is murdered by Gyges because of his wife's anger.
- 715: Lydia annexes Colophon and Magnesia and sieges Smyrna
- 712:
  - Lydia abandons the siege of Smyrna and annexes parts of Troad and Sipylus
  - 712: Korinth annexes Perachora peninsula from Megara
- 710s Eretrian abandonment of Andros
- 709: Kroton is founded by Achaeans
- 707: Taras is founded by Dorians
- 705: Hybla Minor is annexed by Megara Hyblaea
- 704: Korinth gives Samos 4 ships
- 700:
  - The town of Phaselis is founded by the Rhodians
  - Erythra is annexed by Rhegion
- 699: Metapontion is founded by Kroton and Sybaris
- 698: Euarchus is overthrown by Leontini
- 696: Lefkandi is occupied by Chalcis
- 695: Polieum is founded by Ionians
- 691: Antandrus is founded and annexed by Mytilene
- 690: Pheidon becomes tyrant of Argos.
- 689: Gela is founded by Cretans and Rodians
- 688: Arisba is annexed by Methymna and Mytilene declares war on Methymna
- 687: Annual office of Archon established in Athens. Any Athenian citizen can be elected to the office if they have the qualifications. Creon elected first annual archon. (Dating based on Pausanias).
- 686:
  - Methymna is annexed by Mytilene
  - Megara gains independence from Korinth
- 685:
  - The second Messenian war begins.
  - Chalcedon is founded by Megarans
- 680: Epizephyrian Lokros is founded by Opus
- 676: Pergamon is founded by Ionians
- 674: Karystus is occupied by Korinth
- 672: Abydos is settled by Miletus
- 671: Melia is destroyed by Samos and Priene, Samos builds Fort Carium to replace it and Samos and Priene split Melia
- 670: Miletus is sieged by Lydia, Priene is annexed by Lydia, Samos annexes former Melian territory
- 669 or 668: Battle of Hysiae
- 668: Lydia abandons siege of Mietus
- 667: Byzantium is founded by Korinthians
- 665: The second Messenian war ends.
- 664:
  - Corcyran Revolt and First Sea Battle in ancient Greece between Corcyra and Korinthos
  - Akrai is founded and annexed by Syracuse
- 657:
  - Cypselus subjects Corinth to tyranny.
  - Founding of Lekas by Corinth
- 655: Akanthus and Stageira are founded by Androsi
- 654: Abdera is founded by Klazomenaites
- 652: Ephesus and Priene are sacked by Cimmerians
- 651: Levantine War ends, Chalcis wins and annexes Levantine Plain
- 650:
  - The Pontic Pentapolis: Apollonia, Callatis, Mesembria (Nessebar), Odessos (Varna), and Tomis (Constanța), all on the Euxeinos Pontos.
  - Andros, Kea and Tenos gain independence from Eretria, Cypselus leaves Karystus
  - Syracuse annexes Pantalica
- 648: Himera is founded by Zancleans
- 645–560: Spartan wars with Tegea all unsuccessful
- 643: Kasmenai is founded and annexed by Syracuse
- 637–630: Drought on Thera
- 633: Ambrakia founded by Tyrant Gorgus and Korinthians
- 632: Cylon, Athenian noble, seizes Acropolis and tries unsuccessfully to make himself king
- 631: Battus establishes a Greek colony in Cyrene in Libya.
- 630:
  - Helorus is founded and annexed by Syracuse
  - Histria is established by Milesian settlers in order to facilitate trade with the native Getae.
  - Founding of Tripolis by Samos
  - Formal pederasty is introduced, first in Crete, as a means of population control and an educational modality.
- 628: Selinus is founded by Hyblaea Megarans
- 627:
  - Epidamos is founded by Kerkyreans
  - Cypselus is succeeded by Periander
- 625: Establishment of Naucratis
- 621:
  - Draco, Athenian lawgiver, issues code of laws, with many crimes punishable by death.
  - Epidaurus is annexed by Korinth
- 619: Herbessus is annexed by Syracuse
- 616: Miletus is sieged by Lydia
- 615: Leontini is overthrown by Panaetius
- 612: Miletus is overthrown by Thrasybulos
- 610: Panticapaeum (modern city Kerch) is founded by Milesians
- 609: Panaetius is oust by Leontini
- 606: Gorgus is succeeded by Periander
- 604: Lydia abandons the Siege of Miletus
- 603: Athenai annexes Sigeion
- 601: Miletus and Korinth become allies
- 600:
  - Massalia founded by Phocaean Greeks (approximate date).
  - Segesta is Hellenized by Ionians
- 598:
  - Akrillai is founded and annexed by Syracuse
  - Kamarina is founded and annexed by Syracuse
- 597: Delphi gains independence from Kirrha
- 596: Paleopoli is founded by Samosi
- 595:
  - Salamis is annexed by Athens
  - Start of the First Sacred War
- 594:
  - Kirrha is sieged by Amphictyonic League
  - Solon, Athenian statesman, becomes Archon pre-582 BC (cf. ML6 and Plutarch Sol. 14)—later, when member of the Areopagus is appointed to effect social reforms in order to preserve order in Athens, which include the abolition of the security of debts on a debtor's person (Aristotle Ath. Pol. 6), returning exiled Athenian slaves (Solon fr. 4 in Ath. Pol. 12), changing the value of weights and measures to the Korinthian standard, prohibiting the export of grain from Attica and encouraging the planting of olives (Plut. Sol. 22–4), established the property classes (Ar. Ath. Pol. 7) and the council of 400 (Ar. Ath. Pol. 8).
- 592: Ephesus is sieged by Persia
- 590:
  - Siege of Ephesus is abandoned, Lydia annexes Smyrna and Median-Lydian war starts
  - Muorica (Renamed Modica) is annexed by Syracuse
  - Sappho, Greek poet, flourishes on island of Lesbos.
- 589: Klazomenai is sieged by Lydia
- 588: Poseidonia is founded by Sybaris
- 587: Siege of Klazomenai is abandoned by Lydia
- 586:
  - Death of Lycophron tyrant of Corcyra
  - Plataea gains independence from Thebai
- 585:
  - Kirrha is destroyed
  - Lydian-Median border set at Halys River
  - The philosopher Thales of Miletus predicts a solar eclipse that occurs during the Battle of Halys.
  - Periander is overthrown by Psammetichus
  - End of the First Sacred War
- 583: Psammetichus is overthrown by Korinth
- 582:
  - Akragas is founded by Gelans
  - First recorded Pythian Games
- 581:
  - Selinus attacks Motya
  - Korinth join the Peloponnesian League
- 580:
  - Foundation of Parthenope
  - Selinus is defeated by Carthage and withdraws from Motya
  - Periander is overthrown by democrats in Ambrakia
  - Elis joins the Peloponnesian League
  - Lipari is founded by Knidosi
- 578: Thrasybulos dies
- 575: Empúries, also known as Ampurias (Greek: Ἐμπόριον, Catalan: Empúries [əmˈpuɾiəs], Spanish: Ampurias [amˈpuɾjas]), a town on the Mediterranean coast of the Catalan comarca of Alt Empordà in Catalonia, Spain is founded by Greek colonists from Phocaea with the name of Ἐμπόριον (Emporion, meaning "trading place", cf. emporion).
- 572: Pisa and Olympia are annexed by Elis
- 570:
  - Akragas is overthrown by Phalaris
  - Phocaeans from Massalia (modern day Marseille) founded the colony of Monoikos (Monaco).
- 569: Pythagoras is born.
- 565: Peisistratos, Athenian general, organizes Diakrioi, party of poor people.
- 561: Peisistratos takes power in Athens for first time.
- 560:
  - Ephesus is besieged by Lydia
  - Phalaris annexes Himera
- 559:
  - Ephesus is annexed by Lydia
  - Achilleion is founded and annexed by Mytilene
- 559-550: Lydia annexes Aeolis and Ionia
- 557: Argos is overthrown by Perilaus
- 556: Phlius is overthrown by Leo
- 555:
  - Helike (Elche) is established by Greeks from the Achaian city of Helice
  - Peisistratos driven out by Lycurgus who is commander of nobles.
  - Miltiades I unites Thracian Chernessos under his rule
- 554: Phalaris is overthrown by Akragas and Himera gains independence
- 553: Kamarina declares independence from Syracuse
- 552: Kamarina is annexed by Syracuse
- 551: Telemachus overthrows Akragas
- 550:
  - Minoa is founded by Selinus
  - Odessa is established by the Greek city of Histria.
  - Miltiades II is born
- 549:
  - Peisistratos restored by help of Megacles.
  - Boeotian League is founded
- 548: Lesbos sieges Sigeion
- 547: Athens repulses the Lesbans and Sigeion (Now ruled by Hegesistratos) becomes an Athenian vassal
- 546:
  - Sparta annexes Kynouria, Thyrea and Kythera from Argos
  - Croesus, rich king of Lydia, captured at Sardis by Persians.
- 545:
  - Miletus is overthrown by Molpagoras
  - Lygdamis becomes Tyrant of Naxos
  - The ancient Greek colony of Hermonassa (Krasnodar Krai, Russia) is founded by Ionians and Cretans.
- 544: Abdera starts its Golden Age
- 543: Phanagoria, (Krasnodar Krai, Russia), is founded by Teian colonists who had to flee Asia Minor in consequence of their conflict with Cyrus the Great.
- 542:
  - Peisistratos expelled, makes fortune from Thracian mines.
  - The colony of Gorgippia (Krasnodar Krai, Russia) was built by Pontic Greeks.
- 541: Telemachus is overthrown by Alcamenes
- 540:
  - Naxan vassalization of Paros
  - Selinus is overthrown by Theron
- 538:
  - Sybaris conquers Siris
  - Samos is overthrown by Polycrates
- 536: Samos annexes South Mycale from Miletus
- 535: Perilaus dies
- 534: Athens starts extracting tribute from Ios
- 532: Peisistratos restored by Thessaly and Lygdamis of Naxos.
- 531: Ikaria is annexed by Samos
- 530:
  - Emporion becomes a Carthaginian vassal
  - Maktorion is founded by exiled Gelans
  - Tegea joins the Peloponnesian League
- 529: Leo dies
- 528: Maktorion is abandoned and the settlers move to Gela
- 527:
  - Peisistratos dies, succeeded by sons Hippias and Hipparchus.
  - Rineia and Delos are annexed by Samos
- 525:
  - Netum is annexed by Syracuse
  - The ancient Greek city of Euesperides, (modern day Benghazi) is founded by people from Cyrene
  - Persian Cambyses II, son of Cyrus the Great takes Egypt.
- 524:
  - Samos annexes Donousa
  - Lgydamis of Naxos is overthrown
- 523: Chalcedon is annexed by Persian Empire
- 522: Death of Polycrates of Samos and succession of Maiandrios
- 521: Overthrow of Maiandros by Persian backed Syloson
- 520: Peithagoras overthrows Theron
- 519:
  - Plataea leaves the Boeotian League and is sieged by the latter
  - Miltiades is overthrown by Stesagoras
  - Abydos declares independence from Stesagoras and is led by the Persian Tyrant Daphnis
- 518: Athens repulses the Boeotians from Plataea
- 517: Sybaris is overthrown by Telys
- 516:
  - Miltiades II an Athenian Tyrant succeeds Stesagoras and reincorporates Abydos
  - Cassaibile is annexed by Syracuse
- 515:
  - Molpagoras is succeeded by Histiaeos
  - Hippias becomes sole ruler after the death of Hipparchus.
- 514: Tenedos, Lesbos and Abydos is annexed by Persian Empire
- 513:
  - Miltiades II defects from Athens to Persia
  - Myrcinos is founded by Ionians
  - Persia annexes Thrace (Region)
  - Cinyps, Libya, a failed Greek attempt to build a city under the leadership of Dorieus.
- 512:
  - Antandrus is annexed by Persian Empire
  - Persian vassalization of Naxos
- 511:
  - Piraeus is founded and annexed by Athens
  - Thracian Chernessos is annexed by Persian Empire
- 510:
  - Kroton annexes Sybaris and overthrows Telys
  - Pythagoras establishes his own school.
  - Peithagoras is overthrown by Euryleon
  - Minoa is renamed Heraclea Minoa
  - Cinyps is annexed by Carthage
- 508:
  - Andros and Naxos are annexed by Persian Empire
  - Hippias is forced to leave Athens.
- 507:
  - Plataea is sieged by Boeotian League
  - Cleisthenes, Greek reformer, takes power, increases democracy.
- 506:
  - Boeotian League is repulsed from Plataea by Athens
  - Cumae is overthrown by Aristodemus
  - Alcamenes is overthrown by Alcandros
  - The Levantine Plain is conquered by Athens and becomes a cleruchy
- 505:
  - Hegesistratos of Sigeion dies
  - Cleander overthrows Gela
- 504:
  - Cleinias overthrows Croton
  - Taras defeats the Iapygians
- 503: Naxos declares independence from the Persian Empire
- 502: Euryleon is overthrown by Selinus
- 500:
  - Pythagoras dies in Croton, Italy
  - Heraclea Minoa is sacked by Carthage
  - Morgantina and Centuripe are hellenized and Licodia is founded by Leontini
- 499:
  - Miletus Siege of Naxos (Naxan Victory)
  - Independence of Paros
  - Alcandros is overthrown by Akragas
  - Ionian Revolt starts
  - Éphesos, Klazomenai, Mílētos, Samos, Myus, Chios, Samos, Mytilene, Mylasa, Termera, Kyme and Priene declare independence from Persian Empire
- 498:
  - Cyprus (Except Amathos), Caria, Paesos, Abydos, Cios, Percote, Lampsakos, Myrcinos, Tenedos, Dardanos, and Byzantium declare independence from Persian Empire
  - Amathos is sieged by Cyprus
  - Cleander is overthrown by Hippocrates
  - Hippocrates vassalized Leontini and puts Aenesidemus as tyrant
  - Licodia is annexed by Syracuse
- 497:
  - Eion is sieged by Athens
  - Dardanos, Myrcinos, Abydos, Kyme, Klazomenai, Percote, Lampsakos, Cyprus, Cios and Paesos are reannexed by Persian Empire
  - Catania is vassalized by Hippocrates and Deinmenes is put in charge as tyrant
  - Persian Empire occupies all Carian land north of Pedasos (Carian)
- 496:
  - Byzantium is overthrown by Histiaeos
  - Myrcinos is reannexed by the Persian Empire
  - Athenian Tyrant Miltiades II annexes Thracian Chernessos
  - Naxos is vassalized by Hippocrates
- 495: Cleinias dies
- 494:
  - Rhegium is overthrown by Anaxilas
  - Zancle is vassalized by Hippocrates and Scythes put in charge
  - Priene, Samos and Miletus are annexed by Persian Empire
- 493:
  - Byzantium sieges Thasus
  - Ionian revolt crushed
  - Zancle is settled by Samian refugees and renamed Messene
  - Zancle is conquered by Rhegion
- 492:
  - Kamarina (now rebuilt) and Ergezio are vassalized by Hippocrates
  - Abdera and Thracian Chernessos are annexed by the Persian Empire
- 491:
  - Hippocrates is overthrown by Gelon
  - Fort Scyllaeum is founded by Rhegion
- 490:
  - Aristodemus dies
  - Persian conquest of Rhodes
  - Persian Siege of Naxos (Naxan Victory)
  - Persian conquest of Paros
  - Persian sacking of Eretria
  - Themistocles and Miltiades, Athenians, defeat Darius at Marathon, Phidippides runs with news.
  - Taras defeats the Iapygians in battle
- 488: Akragas is overthrown by Theron
- 486: Himera is overthrown by Terillus
- 485: Gelon annexes Syracuse (Except Kamarina and Licodia), Gela is given to Hieron
- 484:
  - Kamarina is destroyed by Gelon
  - Aeschylus, Athenian playwright wins his first victory at the City Dionysia.
- 483:
  - Megara Hyblaea and Licodia are destroyed by Gelon
  - Theron puts his son Thrasydaeus in charge of Himera as his vassal
- 481:
  - Andros, Aegina and Akanthus among many other Greek Poleis declare allegiance to Persia
  - The Naxos, Milos, Sparta, Athens, Korinth, Kythnos and many other Greek Poleis form the Hellenic League to fight against the Persian Empire

== Classical Greece (480–323 BC) ==
- 480:
  - Aegina and Andros are impressed into the Hellenic League
  - Emporion ousts Carthaginian influences
  - Leonidas, Spartan, sacrifices 300 Spartan soldiers at the Battle of Thermopylae so main force can escape; Xerxes son of Darius is commanding the Persians.
  - Croton, Leucas and Corcyra joins the Hellenic League
  - Simultaneous with Thermopylae, the Greeks and Persians fight to a draw in the naval Battle of Artemisium.
  - Boeotia, Attica and Phocis are occupied by Persia
  - Battle of Salamis: Themistocles, Athenian general, lures Persians into Bay of Salamis, Xerxes loses and goes home, leaves behind Mardonius.
  - Possibly simultaneous with the Battle of Salamis, Battle of Himera between Carthage and Akragas (Theron)-Syracuse (Gelon)-Himera (Thrasydaeus)
- 479:
  - Pausanias, Greek general routs Mardonius at the Battle of Plataea.
  - Battle of Mycale
  - Rhodes, Samos, Kos and many Greek cities in Persia begin to declare independence
  - Paros is vassalized by Athens
  - Athens annexes Tenedos
  - Sestos is besieged by Athens
  - Boeotian League is dissolved by Hellenic League
  - Sicel Ducetius overthrows Miniu
- 478:
  - Byzantium is besieged by Athens
  - Delian League is founded by Athens and is soon joined by Ionia, Delos, Kos, Euboea, Tilos, Rhodes, Karpathos, Athenai, Paros, Troezen, Sifnos, Doris, Aeolis, Andros, Aenea, Akanthos, Samos, Chalcis, Eretria, Chios, Methymna, Chalkidiki, Mutilḗnē, Sigeion, Éphesos and many others
  - Gelon dies and is succeeded by Hieron, Polyzelos is put in control of Gela
- 477:
  - The Persian Empire abandons Europe except Doriskus and Eion
  - Chalcedon, Byzantium, Carystus, Ainos, Perinthos and others join the Delian League
  - Andros is turned into an Athenian cleruchy
- 476:
  - Micythus becomes Tyrant of Rhegion after Anaxilas' death
  - Catania is split between Hieron and Ducetius, Catania is renamed Aetna, settled by Dorians and ruled by the Tyrant Deinmenes II
  - Taras allies with Rhegion to protect themselves from the Iapygians, but later lose to them in battle
  - Himera is settled by Doric colonists
  - Sybaris declares independence from Kroton
- 476–462: Cimon elected general each year
- 475:
  - Sybaris is annexed by Kroton
  - Abdera and Eion join the Delian League
  - Skyros is annexed by Athens
- 474:
  - Battle of Cumae
  - Naxos joins the Delian League
  - Hieron occupies the Parthenopean Islands
  - Pindar, Greek poet relocates to Thebes (in Greece) from court at Syracuse.
- 473: Taras is defeated by the Iapygians
- 472: Thrasydaeus annexes Akragas after death of Theron
- 471:
  - Naxos leaves the Delian League and is subsequently sieged by Athens
  - Themistocles ostracized.
- 470:
  - Dénia, Hēmeroskopeion (Ancient Greek: Ἡμεροσκοπεῖον) is founded by Massaliot Greeks. The town was situated on the cape then called Artemisium (Ancient Greek: Ἀρτεμίσιον) or Dianium (Ancient Greek: Διάνιον), named from a temple of Ephesia Artemis built upon it (goddess Artemis was called Diana in Latin).
  - Naxos is impressed into the Delian League
  - Ducetius annexes Ergezio
  - The new urban zone of Neápolis (Νεάπολις) was founded by citizens of the nearby Greek city of Cumae on the plain of Parthenope after the victorious Battle of Cumae
- 469:
  - Illios is annexed by Mytilene
  - Klazomenai, Phaselis, Aspendos, Doris and Priene join the Delian League
- 468:
  - Thrasydaeus is overthrown by Akragas
  - Sophocles, Greek playwright, defeats Aeschylus for Athenian Prize for drama.
- 467: Micythus steps down to Leophron
- 466:
  - Taras is defeated by the Iapygians
  - Taras' monarchy is overthrown by democrats
  - Thrasybulos succeeds Hieron
- 465:
  - Thasus leaves the Delian League and is sieged by Athens
  - Abydos and Troad join the Delian League
  - Thracian Chernessos is annexed by Athens
  - Deinmenes II, Aenesidemus, Thrasybulos and Polyzelos are overthrown by their respective cities
- 464: earthquake in Sparta starting a helot revolt
- 463: Thasus is impressed into the Delian League
- 462: Megara leaves the Peloponnesian League
- 461:
  - Catania, Naxos and Catania declare independence from Syracuse, Dorian settlers are removed from Catania
  - Kamarina is refounded under the Tyranny of Psaumis
  - Cimon ostracized.
  - Thera joins the Peloponnesian League
  - Messene and Rhegion separate and oust Leophron
- 460:
  - Taras defeats the Iapygians
  - Aetna is founded
  - First Peloponnesian War Starts
- 459:
  - Aegina is besieged by Athens
  - Morgantina is annexed by Ducetius
- 459-455: Siege of Memphis, destruction of the Athenian fleet by Megabyzus
- 458: Imbros is annexed by Athens
- 457:
  - Aegina is impressed into the Delian League
  - Delphi is annexed by Phocis
  - Pericles, Athenian statesman begins Golden Age, he was taught by Anaxagoras, who believed in dualistic Universe and atoms.
  - Boeotia (Except Thebes), Phocis and Locris join the Delian League
- 456:
  - Gythium is raided by Athens
  - Zakynthos joins the Delian League
  - Castrugiuvanni (Enna) join Ducetius
  - Aeschylus dies.
- 455: Nafpaktos is impressed into the Delian League and settled with Messenian Helots
- 454:
  - Abacaenum is annexed by Ducetius
  - Movement of Delian treasury to Athens and start of the First Athenian Empire
  - Athenian annexation of Delos
- 453: Palike is founded by Ducetius
- 452:
  - Akragas and Aetna are annexed by Ducetius, Ducetius sieges Motyon
  - Nea Sybaris is founded by Sybarites
- 451:
  - Athens besieges Kition
  - Motyon is occupied by Ducetius
- 450:
  - Naxos becomes a cleruchy
  - Akragas and Motyon are liberated from Ducetius starting a decades long conflict between Syracuse+friends and the Sicels
- 449:
  - Delphi declares independence from Phocis
  - Ducetius abandons the Sicel Federation he created and is forced to go into exile at Korinth
  - Morgantina is annexed Syracuse
  - Herodotus, Greek Historian, writes History of Greco-Persian War from 490 to 479.
- 448: Delphi is annexed by Phocis
- 447:
  - Ictinus and Callicrates, Greek architects, begin construction of the Parthenon.
  - Nea Sybaris is annexed by Kroton
  - Chalcis leaves the Delian League and is besieged by Athens
- 446:
  - Phocis, Locris and Boeotia leave the Delian League, Boeotia unites into the Boeotian League and joins the Peloponnesian League
  - Megara joins the Peloponnesian League
  - Kale Akte is founded by Ducetius
  - Achaea and Trozen leave the Peloponnesian League and join the Delian League
- 446-445: Euboean Revolt
- 445:
  - Euboea is impressed into the Delian League
  - Histiaea becomes an Athenian cleruchy
  - First Peloponnesian War Ends
  - Troezen is impressed into the Peloponnesian League
- 443: Thurii is founded by Sybarites and Various Hellenes
- 441:
  - Euripides, Greek playwright, wins Athenian prize.
  - Sybaris on the Traeis is founded by Sybarites exiled from Thurii
- 440:
  - Samos leaves the Delian League and is besieged by Athens
  - Palike is destroyed, ending the Sicel Federation
  - Ducetius dies
- 439: Samos is impressed into the Delian League
- 438: Founding of the Bosporan Kingdom
- 437:
  - Newly founded Amphipolis annexes Eion
  - Athens allies with Messapia
- 436: Taulantii-Epidamos War
- 435: Phidias, Greek sculptor, completes statue of Zeus at Elis, 1 of 7 wonders of the world.
- 434:
  - Epidamos becomes a democracy
  - Epidamos is annexed by Korinth
  - Kerkyra allies with Taulantii and besiege Epidamos
  - Kerkyra seizes Outer Epidamos (City)
  - Battle of Leukimme
  - Kerkyra raids Kyllene
  - Kerkyra joins Delian League
- 433:
  - Battle of Sybota
  - Anactorium is annexed by Korinth
- 432:
  - Psaumis dies
  - Potidaea leaves the Delian League and is sieged by Athens
  - Pydna is besieged by Athens
  - End of "Golden Age" of Athens
- 431:
  - Sparta commanded by King Archidamus II prepares to destroy Athens thus starting the Peloponnesian War.
  - Plataea is besieged by Thebes
  - Pagae and Atalanta is occupied by Athens
  - Aegina is annexed by Athens
  - Empedocles, Greek doctor, believes body has Four Temperaments.
- 430:
  - Athens abandons the Siege of Pydna
  - Herakleion is impressed into the Delian League
  - Spartan Siege of Zakynthos (Local Victory)
  - Failed peace mission by Athens, bubonic plague year, Sparta takes no prisoners.
  - Leucippus, Greek philosopher, believes every natural event has natural cause. Athenian Plague begins in Athens.
- 429:
  - Herakleion is annexed by Macedonia
  - Potidaea is impressed into the Delian League
  - All Chalkidiki cities (Except Mende, Acanthus, Scione, Stagirus and Aphytis) leave the Delian League
  - Athens Siege of Kydonia (Local Victory)
  - Phormio, Athenian admiral, wins the Battle of Chalcis/Rhium.
  - Pericles dies of Athenian Plague, possibly typhus or bubonic plague.
  - Hippocrates, Greek doctor, believes diseases have physical cause.
  - First Battle of Naupaktos (Athenian Victory)
- 428:
  - Plato born.
  - Mytilene and Antissa leave the Delian league and Mytilene is sieged by Athens, Antissa is sieged by Methymna
  - Illios joins the Delian League
- 427:
  - Suppression of Mytilene, Antissa is annexed by Methymna, Mytilene becomes an Athenian cleruchy, Mytilene Troad joins the Delian League as independent cities
  - Archidamus II dies, Alcidas, Greek admiral sent to help Lesbos, raids Ionia and flees after seeing Athenian might. Athenian Plague returns.
  - Plataea is impressed into the Boeotian League and by extension, the Peloponnesian League
  - Aristophanes, Greek playwright, wins Athenian Prize.
  - Corcyran Civil War (Democratic Victory)
  - First Athenian Intervention in Sicily begins
- 426:
  - Megara occupies Pegae
  - Athens sieges Lecus
  - Pylos, Messene, Mylae, Aegitium and Tichium are occupied by Athens, Pylos is founded by escaped Helots
  - Battle of Tanagra
  - Amfissa joins the Peloponnesian League
  - Ozolian Locris join the Delian League
  - Demosthenes, Athenian general, and Cleon, Athenian demagogue, revitalizes Athenian forces, makes bold plans opposed by Nicias, his first military campaign barely succeeds.
  - Ambrakia occupies Olpae and Argos
  - Acarnanian League and Amphilochian League are founded and join the Delian League
- 425:
  - Acarnania occupies Olpae and Argos
  - Athenian fleet bottles up Spartan navy at Navarino Bay, Nicias resigns.
  - Herakleion is impressed into the Delian League
  - Athens occupies Sphacteria
  - Morgantina is annexed by Kamarina
  - Ozolian Locris joins the Peloponnesian League
  - Athens withdraws from Lecas and Acarnania
  - Athens withdraws from Messene and Mylae is impressed into the Delian League
- 424:
  - Herakleion is annexed by Makedonia
  - Eion, Akanthus and Amphipolis are besieged by Sparta
  - Stagira joins the Peloponnesian League
  - Nisaia, and Siphae are occupied by Athenai
  - Thyrea is occupied by Athens
  - First Athenian Intervention in Sicily ends
  - Pagondas of Thebes (in Greece) crushes Athenian army at the Battle of Delium, Brasidas a Spartan general, has a successful campaign in the Chalcidice, Cleon exiles Thucydides for 20 years for arriving late.
- 423:
  - Sparta occupied Amphipolis and Scione
  - Torone is occupied by Makedonia
  - Akanthus joins the Peloponnesian League
  - Truce of Laches supposed to stop Brasidas but does not, Nicias commands Athenian forces in retaking Mende.
  - Olynthus form the Chalcidian League independent of the Delian League
- 422:
  - Stagira is besieged by Athens
  - Neapolis is annexed by Rome
  - Torone and Scione are impressed into the Delian League
  - Cleon meets Brasidas outside of Amphipolis, both are killed (Battle of Amphipolis).
  - Syracuse annexes the now weak Leontini
- 421:
  - Peace of Nicias brings temporary end to war, but Alcibiades, a nephew of Pericles, makes anti-Sparta alliance.
  - Herakleion is impressed into the Delian League
  - Cumae is annexed by Oscans
  - Athens abandons the Siege of Stagira
  - Delphi declares independence from Phocis
  - Argulus, Apollonia, Potidaea, Akanthus, Stageira and others join the Chalcidian League
- 420: Mantineia, Argos, Elis, Sicyon and Achaea betray Sparta and switch to the Delian League
- 419:
  - Athens occupies Epidauros
  - King Agis II of Sparta attacks Argos, makes treaty.
- 418:
  - Battle of Mantinea, greatest land battle of war, gives Sparta victory over Argos, which violated treaty, Alcibiades thrown out, alliance ended.
  - Orchmenos is occupied by Argos
- 417:
  - Orchmenos is given to Boeotia
  - Sicyon joins the Peloponnesian League
  - Epidauros is occupied by Sparta
- 416:
  - Melos is besieged by Athens
  - Alcibiades makes plans, is restored to power.
  - Selinus annexes Segesta's frontier provinces
  - Massacre of the Melians.
- 415:
  - Hermai statues are mutilated in Athens, Alcibiades accused, asks for inquiry, told to set sail for battle (Sicilian Expedition), is condemned to death in absentia, he defects to Sparta.
  - Many Syracusan cities rebel
- 415–413: Siege of Syracuse
- 414-413: Metapontion allies with Athens
- 414: Lamachus, Athenian commander killed at Syracuse.
- 413:
  - Nicias and Demosthenes killed at Syracuse
  - Leontini and Kamarina are vassalized by Syracuse
  - Herakleion is annexed by Makedonia
  - Miletus and Khios betray Athens and join the Peloponnesian League
- 412:
  - Alcibiades is expelled from Sparta, conspires to come back to Athens.
  - Methymna is occupied by Sparta
  - Klazomenai and Kyzikus betray Athens and join the Peloponnesian League
  - Chios is sieged by Athens
  - Aygrion dies and is succeeded by Aygris
- 411:
  - Sparta allies with Persia
  - Aspendos is annexed by Persia
  - Kyzikus and Klazomenai are impressed into the Delian League
  - Oropos is occupied by Boeotia
  - Illios is annexes by Lampsacus
  - Athens abandons the Siege of Chios
  - Sparta leaves Methymna
  - Euboea, Byzantium, Abydos, Andros, Antandrus, Lampsacus, Chalcedon and Rodos betray Athens and join the Peloponnesian League
  - Abydos is overthrown by Dercylidas
  - Selinus attacks Segesta once again and aggravates Carthage
  - Athens is overthrown by the Four Hundred
- 410:
  - After several successes, Athenian demagogue Cleophon rejects Spartan peace offers.
  - Segesta is annexed by Carthage
  - Four Hundred are overthrown by Athens
- 409:
  - Antandrus is annexed by Persia
  - Abydos is besieged by Athens
  - Sparta sieges Klazomenai
  - Selinus and Himera are sacked by Carthage
  - Byzantium recaptured by Alcibiades for Athens.
- 408:
  - The 3: poleis of Rodos unite and build a new capital called Rodos
  - Athens besieges Paleopoli
  - Athens abandons Siege of Abydos
  - Sparta abandons the Siege of Klazomenai
  - Alcibiades reenters Athens in triumph, Lysander, a Spartan commander, has fleet built at Ephesus.
- 407:
  - Thermae is founded by Carthage
  - Athens abandons the Siege of Paleopoli
  - Lysander begins destruction of Athenian fleet, Alcibiades stripped of power.
- 406:
  - Sparta sieges Methymna
  - Akragas is sacked by Carthage
  - Callicratides, Spartan naval commander, loses Battle of Arginusae over blockade of Mitylene harbor, Sparta sues for peace, rejected by Cleophon.
- 405:
  - Methymna is impressed into the Peloponnesian League
  - Syracuse is overthrown by Dionysius the Elder
  - Melos is annexed by Sparta
  - Gela, Kamarina and Akrillai is sacked by Carthage
  - Carthage allow the people of the sacked cities to return as Carthaginian subjects and rebuild their cities
  - Leontini and Morgantina declare independence from Syracuse
  - Carthage annexes Elymi, Sicel and Sican territory
  - The naval Battle of Aegospotami in which Lysander captures the Athenian fleet, Spartan king Pausanias besieges Athens, Cleophon executed, Corinth and Thebes demand destruction of Athens.
  - Klazomenai and Ephesus betray Athens and join the Peloponnesian League. All Carthaginian subjects (Except Ziz, their islands, Motya, Solus, Elymi, Segesta, and Entella) gain independence
- 404:
  - Athens capitulates April 25. Theramenes secures terms, prevents total destruction of Athens, Theramenes and Alcibiades are killed.
  - Delian League is dissolved
  - Korinth leaves the Peloponnesian League
  - Entella is overthrown by mercenaries loyal to Carthage
  - Aygris becomes a Syracusan Subject
  - Nafpaktos is annexed by Ozolian Locris
  - Athens is overthrown by the Thirty
  - Athens joins the Peloponnesian League
- 403:
  - Aeimnestus, who is loyal to Dionysius, overthrows Castrugiuvanni
  - Aetna is overthrown by mercenaries loyal to Dionysius
  - Dionysius destroys Naxos and Catania and Sicels split Naxos with Syracuse, Catania is ruled by Campanian mercenaries loyal to Dionysius
  - Athens overthrows the Thirty
  - Athens leaves the Peloponnesian League and refounds the Delian League
- 402: Elis leaves the Peloponnesian League and is subsequently sieged by Sparta
- 401:
  - Euboea joins the Delian League
  - Elis is sacked and impressed into the Peloponnesian League
  - Dionysius free Castrugiuvanni from Aeimnestus
  - Poseidonia is annexed by Lucanians
  - Thucydides, Greek historian, leaves account of "Golden Age of Pericles" and Peloponnesian War at his death (History of the Peloponnesian War).
- 400:
  - Adranon is founded by Dionysius
  - Aygris annexes Centuripe
  - Democritus, Greek philosopher, develops Atomic theory, believes cause and necessity, nothing comes out of nothing
- 399:
  - Illios declares independence from Lampsacus
  - Sparta sways Persian Controlled Greek cities near Pergamon to their side and march on Egyptian Larissa and siege it
  - Socrates, Greek philosopher, condemned to death for corrupting youth.
- 398:
  - Ionia joins the Peloponnesian League
  - All Carthaginian subjects (Except Ziz, their islands, Motya, Solus, Elymi, Segesta, and Entella) gain independence from Carthage
  - Dionysius sieges Segesta and Entella
  - Mainland territory of Motya is occupied by Dionysius
- 397:
  - Motya is destroyed by Dionysius and the Carthaginians build Lilybaion to replace it
  - Dionysius abandons the Sieges of Entella and Segesta
  - Eryx, Segesta, Lipari, Messene and Entella are annexed by Carthage
  - Carthage allies with the Sicel cities except Assorus
  - Tauormenion is founded by Carthage to be a supply base, settled by Sicels
  - Carthaginian forces have to go the long way around Mount Etna due to an eruption
  - Catania is occupied by Carthage
  - Battle of Catania
  - Syracuse is besieged by Carthage
- 396:
  - Carthage lifts the Siege of Syracuse and abandons Eastern Sicily except Messene and Lipari
  - Himera and Selinus are annexed by Carthage
  - Gela, Ergezio, Catania, Adranon, Kamarina and Leontini are annexed by Dionysius
  - Tyndaris is founded by Dionysius to combat piracy and a base of operations
  - Persia annexes Rodos
  - Sparta campaigns in Phrygia
- 395:
  - Sparta campaigns in Ionia, Caria and march up to Sardis
  - Orchmenus leaves the Boeotian League
  - Cephaloedium is annexed by Dionysius
  - Mylae is annexed by Rhegion
  - Argos, Korinthos and Boeotian League leave the Peloponnesian League
- 394:
  - Sparta withdraws from Anatolia
  - All Thracian and Anatolian Greek cities leave the Peloponnesian League (Except Sestos and Abydos)
  - Virtually all Greek Anatolian cities are annexed by Persia
  - Klazomenaites relocate to an island off shore
  - Mylae is annexed by Syracuse
- 393:
  - Lipari is annexed by Syracuse
  - Italiote League is formed by Sybaris on the Traeis, Croton, Caulonia, Thurii, Rhegium and Velia
  - Imbros, Lemnos and Skyros are annexed by Athens
  - Makedonia starts paying tribute to the newly formed Kingdom of Dardania
  - Chalcidian League annexes some Makedonian land
- 392:
  - Sparta occupies Lechaeum
  - Heraclea Minoa, Akragas and Sicani territory are annexed by Carthage
  - Sicel territory is annexed by Dionysius
  - Makedonia stops paying tribute to Dardania
  - Makedonia reannexes the land taken by the Chalcidian League
  - Damastion is annexed by Dardania
- 391:
  - Korinth occupies Phlius
  - Tauromenion is overthrown by mercenaries loyal to Dionysius
  - Makedonia starts pays tribute to Dardania
- 390:
  - The Acarnanian League joins the Peloponnesian League
  - Dercylidas is succeeded by Anaxibios
  - Himera is merged into Thermae
  - Dionysius transfers control of Mylae to Messene
  - Kroton is annexed by Syracuse
  - Argos and Korinth unite into Argos-Korinth
  - Castrugiuvani is annexed by Syracuse
- 389:
  - Metapontion is annexed by Syracuse
  - Anaxibios is overthrown by Abydos
- 387:
  - Rhegion is annexed by Syracuse and renamed it to Phoebea
  - Peace of Antalcidas concluded between the Greeks and the Persians that leads to virtually all Greek cities in Asia Minor being annexed by Persia
  - Ancona is founded by Greek settlers from Syracuse, who gave it its name: Ancona stems from the Greek word Ἀγκών (Ankòn), meaning "elbow"
  - Argos and Korinth split
  - All cities gain independence and all league except the Peloponnesian League are disbanded
- 386: Phlius becomes a democracy
- 385:
  - Dardania attacks Molossia
  - The Greeks colonized the island of Pharos (Hvar, Croatia).
- 384:
  - Dionysius occupies Pyrgi and Caere
  - Chalcidian League annexes Makedonia land including Pella
- 383:
  - Gela gains independence from Syracuse
  - Dionysius leaves Eturia
  - Liburnia besieges Pharos
  - Potidaea leaves the Chalcidian League
- 382:
  - Thebes is overthrown by Leontiades and Archias
  - Thebes is impressed into the Peloponnesian League
- 380:
  - Sparta besieges Phlius
  - Makedonia recaptures their former territory
- 379:
  - Kroton is annexed by Dionysius
  - Phlius is impressed into the Peloponnesian League
  - The Chalcidian League is disbanded and its former members are impressed into the Peloponnesian League and Potidaea and Korinth also join the league
  - Leontiades and Archias are overthrown and Thebes leaves the Peloponnesian League
  - Sparta occupies Thespiae
- 378: Themison overthrows Eretria
- 377: The Boeotian League is refounded by Thebes
- 376:
  - Abdera is sacked by the Triballi and Maroneia
  - Thespiae and the rest of Boeotia are liberated and join the Boeotian League
- 375:
  - The Acarnanian League defects from the Peloponnesian League and joins the Delian League
  - Chalcidian League is reestablished by Olynthus and joins the Delian League
- 373: Kerkyra is besieged by Sparta
- 371: Sparta leaves Kerkyra
- 370:
  - Gythium is occupied by Thebes
  - Heraclea Sintica is founded by Makedonia
- 369: Korinth is overthrown by Timophanes
- 368: Aetolian League is founded
- 367:
  - Daparria is annexed by Dardania
  - Kroton is annexed by Bruttian League
- 366: Opus declares independence from Athens with the help of Themison
- 365: Opus requests Thebes to protect them from Athens and sends a garrison. Opus is impressed into the Boeotian League
- 364:
  - Timophanes is assassinated
  - Orchmenus leaves the Boeotian League and is subsequently sieged by Thebes
- 363:
  - Orchmenus is impressed into the Boeotian League
  - Pydna is impressed into the Delian League
- 362: Themison dies and is succeeded by Plutarch
- 361: Potidaea and Torone are impressed into the Delian League and become Athenian Cluerchies
- 360:
  - Tauromenion overthrows the mercenaries and falls under the tyranny of Andromache
  - Illios is overthrown by Charidemos
  - Abydos is overthrown by Iphiades
- 359:
  - Charidemos is overthrown by Illios
  - Dardania annexes Lake Ohrid and Upper Macedonia
  - Archelaus annexes Methone, Aegae and Pydna
- 358:
  - Archelaus is annexed by Makedonia
  - Macedonia reannexes Lake Ohrid, Lynkestis and Upper Macedonia from Dardania
  - Makedonia annexes Paeonia
- 357:
  - Social War Starts
  - Kos, Khios, Rodos and Byzantium leave the Delian League
  - Makedonia annexes Pydna and Amphipolis
  - Dionysius II is overthrown by Dion
- 356:
  - Phocis annexes Delphi
  - Locris is annexed by Dionysius II
  - Lemnos, Samos and Imbros is occupied by Chios and leave the Delian League
  - Makedonia annexes Crenides, renames it Philippi and settles it with Makedonians
  - Makedonian border set on Nestus river
  - Potidaea and Anthemus are annexed by Chalcidian League
  - Makedonia besieges Methone
  - Lokros is overthrown by Dionysius II
- 355:
  - Social War Ends
  - Argolas is besieged by Phocis
  - Dion is overthrown by Callipus
- 354:
  - Methone and Abdera are annexed by Makedonia
  - Phocis abandons the Siege of Argolas
  - Thessaly is vassalized by Phocis
- 353:
  - Catania is annexed by Callipus
  - Makedonia occupied Pagasae
  - Thessaly is vassalized by Makedonia
- 352:
  - Callipus is overthrown by Hipparinos (Callipus keeps Catania)
  - Nicodemus overthrows Centuripe
  - Orchmenus and Chaeronea are occupied by Phocis
- 351: Rhegion is annexed by Callipus
- 350:
  - Akanthos is annexed by Makedonia
  - Nice (Nicaea) is founded by the Greeks of Massalia (Marseille), and was given the name of Nikaia (Νίκαια) in honour of a victory over the neighbouring Ligurians; Nike (Νίκη) was the Greek goddess of victory.
  - Hipparinos is overthrown by Aretaeus
  - Mamercus ousts Callippus from Catania
- 349:
  - Plutarch is expelled from Eretria
  - Aretaeus is overthrown by Nysaios
- 348:
  - Stagira is annexed by Makedonia
  - Callipus is overthrown by Leptines
- 347:
  - Leontini is overthrown by Hicetas
  - Plato, Greek philosopher, founder of Academy, dies.
  - Methymna is overthrown by Kleommis
- 346:
  - Phocis withdraws from Boeotia
  - Dionysius II leaves Locris and overthrows Nysaios
  - Lyttos is besieged by Knossos
  - Makedonia occupies Thermopylae and Antikyra, Nicaea is occupied by Thessaly
- 345:
  - Makedonia withdraws from Thermopylae and Antikyra
  - Grabaei becomes a vassal of Macedonia
  - Hicetas sieges Syracuse and seizes Syracuse's territory
  - The Pro-Makedonian Tyrant Hipparchus overthrows Eretria
  - Mainland Syracuse (City) is occupied by Hicetas leaving only the citadel in Dionysius' control
- 344:
  - Macedonia occupies Illios and annexes Tenedos
  - Siege of Lyttos lifted by Knossos
  - Knossos besieges Kydonia
  - Hicetas is repulsed by Timoleon from Syracuse
  - Timoleon takes control of all Syracusan forces outside the citadel
- 343:
  - Messene is rebuilt by Timoelon, Adranon is freed from mercenary control, Nicodemus is overthrown by Centuripe with help of Timoleon
  - Timoleon annexes the citadel
  - Siege of Kydonia is lifted by Knossos
- 342: Rhegion is freed by Timoleon
- 342: Aristotle, Greek philosopher, begins teaching Alexander, son of Philip of Macedon.
- 341:
  - Hipparchus is overthrown by Athenian forces and impressed into the Delian league
  - Samothrace is annexed by Makedonia
- 340:
  - Antipolis (modern day Antibes) is founded by Phocaean Greeks from Massilia.
  - Skyros is annexed by Makedonia
  - Entella is freed by Timoleon
- 339:
  - Elateia is occupied by Makedonia
  - Agyris and Aetna are freed by Timoleon
  - Nicaea is occupied by Boeotia
- 338:
  - Amphissa is annexed by Delphi
  - Thyrea is annexed by Argos
  - Mamercus dies
  - Cumae is annexed by Rome
  - Leontini is freed by Timoleon
  - Nafpaktos joins the Aetolian League
- 338: King Philip II of Macedon defeats Athens and Thebes at Battle of Chaeronea August 2 and establishes League of Corinth during winter of 338 BC/337 BC.
- 337: Amfissa declares independence from Delphi
- 336:
  - Timoleon dies
  - Lesbos is annexed by Makedonia
  - Alexander succeeds father Philip II, who was assassinated by Pausanias of Orestis.
- 334:
  - Andromache dies and his city is annexed by Syracuse
  - Battle of the Granicus
- 333:
  - Saminum is occupied by Epirus
  - Alexander defeats Persians at Battle of Issus, but Darius III escapes.
- 332:
  - Epirus occupies Heraclea, Metapontium, Southern Lucania, Daunia, Paestum, Terina and Sipontum
  - Siege of Tyre
  - Siege of Gaza
  - Alexander conquers Egypt.
  - Alexandria is founded by Alexander the Great
- 331:
  - Epirus occupies Cosentia
  - Battle of Pandosia
  - Gerasa (Jordan) is founded by Makedonian veterans
  - At the Battle of Gaugamela October 1, Alexander ends Achaemenid Dynasty and conquers Persian Empire.
  - Alexander the Great enters in Babylon
  - Tauromenion is freed by Carthage
  - Battle of the Uxian Defile (East of Susa, Iran)
- 330:
  - Sparta joins the League of Corinth
  - Battle of the Persian Gate, destruction of Persepolis (modern Iran)
- 330-325: Pytheas makes the earliest Greek voyage to Great Britain and the Arctic Circle for which there is a record.
- 329:
  - Siege of Cyropolis
  - Battle of Jaxartes
  - Alexander conquers Samarkand, Uzbekistan
  - Alexander the Great founds Alexandria Eschate in modern Tajikistan
- 329-160: Dayuan Kingdom.
- 328: Sybaris on the Traeis is annexed by Bruttian League
- 327:
  - Oenidae is impressed into the Aetolian League
  - Under the command of Alexander the Great the forces of the Hellenic League captures the fortress of the Sogdian Rock. Sogdiana and the Kabul region came under Hellenic control
  - Alexander invades northern India, but his army is despondent and refuses to march further eastwards.
- 326:
  - Battle of the Hydaspes
  - Samos joins the Delian League
  - Alexandria Bucephalous (located on the Hydaspes river, Pakistan) is founded by Alexander the Great in memory of his beloved horse Bucephalus
- 325: Nearchus serving under Alexander the Great discovers Tylos (the name used by the Greeks to refer to Bahrain).
- 324:
  - Kroton is overthrown by Menedemus
  - Charax Spasinu, one of Alexander's last cities before his death, is established at the head of the Persian Gulf (modern Iran) replacing a small Persian settlement, Durine.

== Hellenistic Greece (323–30 BC) ==
- 323: King Alexander dies, his generals vie for power in Wars of the Diadochi
- 322–320: First War of the Diadochi.
- 320: Partition of Triparadisus
- 320–311: Second War of the Diadochi
- 316: Menander, Greek playwright, wins Athenian prize.
- 312–63: Seleucid Empire
- 310:
  - Zeno of Citium founds his stoic school in Athens.
  - Battle of White Tunis (near modern Tunis, Tunisia)
- 307: Epicurus founds his philosophic school in Athens.
- 305–30: Ptolemaic Kingdom
- 305: Seleucia, also known as Seleucia-on-Tigris or Seleucia on the Tigris (modern Iraq) is founded by Seleucus I Nicator
- 301: Battle of Ipsus
- 300:
  - Antioch, is founded by Seleucus I Nicator in honor of his father Antiochus
  - Euclid, Greek mathematician, publishes Elements, treating both geometry and number theory (see also Euclidean algorithm).
- 295: Athens falls to Demetrius, Lachares killed.
- 282–133: Kingdom of Pergamon
- 281: Creation of the Achaean League
- 280: The Greek colony of Aspálathos (Aσπάλαθος) is founded (modern day Split).
- 280–275: Pyrrhic War
- 279: Gallic invasion of the Balkans
- 274–271: First Syrian War
- 267–262: Chremonidean War
- 265: Archimedes, Greek mathematician, develops Archimedes' screw, specific gravity, center of gravity; anticipates discoveries of integral calculus.
- 260–253: Second Syrian War
- 256–125: Greco-Bactrian Kingdom
- 246–241: Third Syrian War
- 235: Tanais (Rostov-on-Don, Russia) is founded by merchant adventurers from Miletus
- 220: Euthydemus I of the Greco-Bactrians led expeditions as far as Kashgar and Ürümqi in Xinjiang, leading to the first known contacts between China and the West.
- 219–217: Fourth Syrian War
- 214–205: First Macedonian War
- 203–200: Fifth Syrian War
- 200–196: Second Macedonian War
- 192–188: Roman–Syrian War
- 180–10 AD Indo-Greek Kingdom
- 172–167: Third Macedonian War
- 170–168: Sixth Syrian War
- 155 BC: Attack of the Indo-Greeks on Pataliputra, a magnificent fortified city with 570 towers and 64 gates according to Megasthenes, who describes the ultimate destruction of the city's walls.
- 150 BC King Attalus II of Pergamon founds the city of Attaleia or Antalya in his honour.
- 150–148: Fourth Macedonian War
- 146: Battle of Corinth
- 30: Death of Ptolemaic Queen Cleopatra

== See also ==
- Timeline of Athens
