= 6th century BC =

One hundred years, from 600 BC to 501 BC

The 6th century BC started on the first day of 600 BC and ended on the last day of 501 BC.

In Western Asia, the first half of this century was dominated by the Neo-Babylonian Empire, which had risen to power late in the previous century after successfully rebelling against Assyrian rule. The Kingdom of Judah came to an end in 586 BC when Babylonian forces under Nebuchadnezzar II captured Jerusalem, and removed most of its population to their own lands. Babylonian rule was ended in the 540s by Cyrus, who founded the Persian Empire in its stead. The Persian Empire continued to expand and grew into the greatest empire the world had known at the time.

In Iron Age Europe, the Celtic expansion was in progress. China was in the Spring and Autumn period.

- Mediterranean: Beginning of Greek philosophy, flourishes during the 5th century BC
- The late Hallstatt culture period in Eastern and Central Europe, the late Bronze Age in Northern Europe
- East Asia: the Spring and Autumn period. Confucianism, Legalism and Moism flourish. Laozi founds Taoism
- West Asia: Fall of the Neo-Babylonian and Median empires; rise of the Achaemenid Empire. This was also the time of the Babylonian captivity of the ancient Jews.
- Ancient India: the Buddha and Mahavira founded Buddhism and Jainism respectively
- The decline of the Olmec civilization in Central America

== The world in the 6th century BC ==
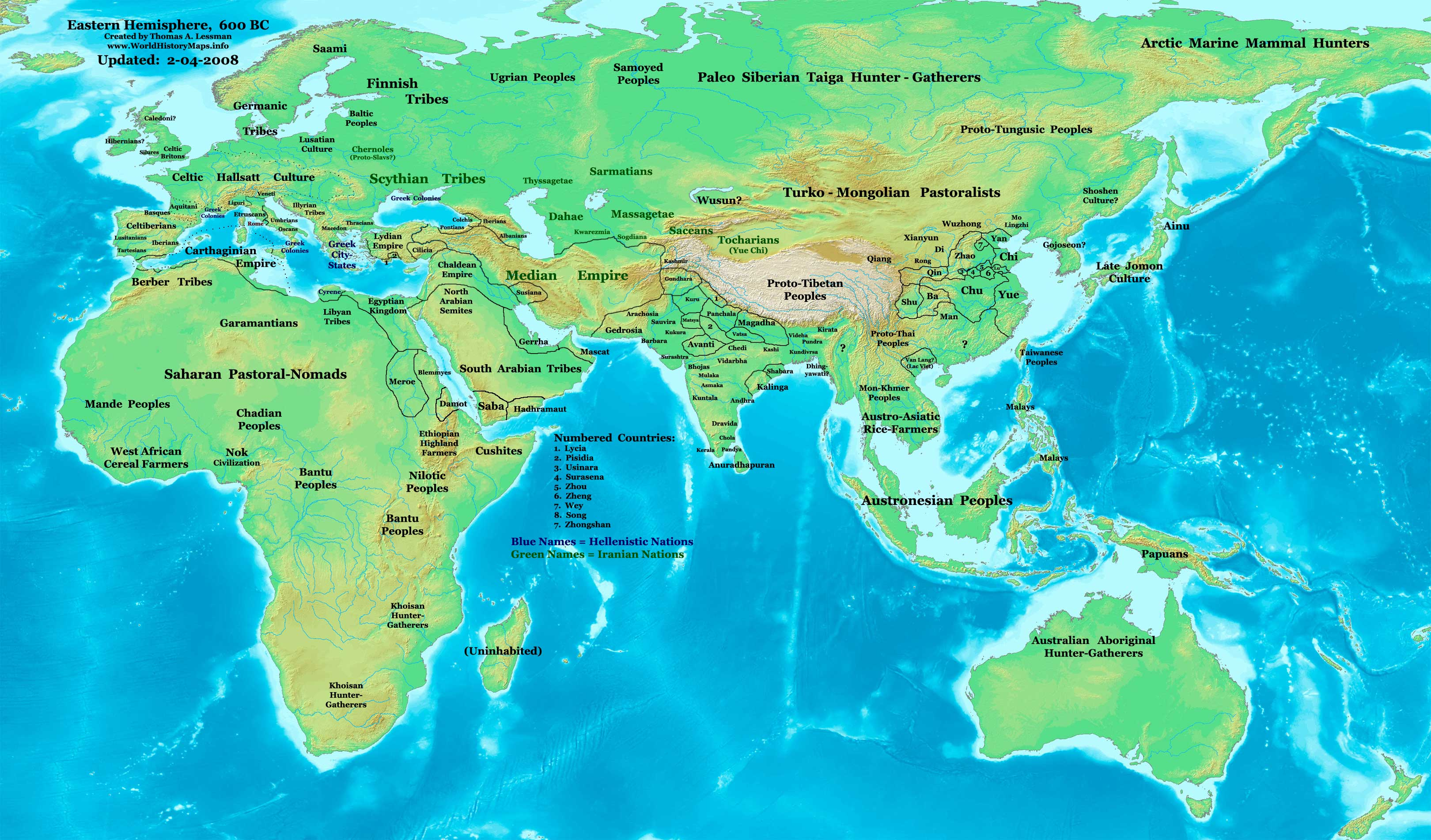
Map of the Eastern Hemisphere in 600 BC, the beginning of the sixth century BC.

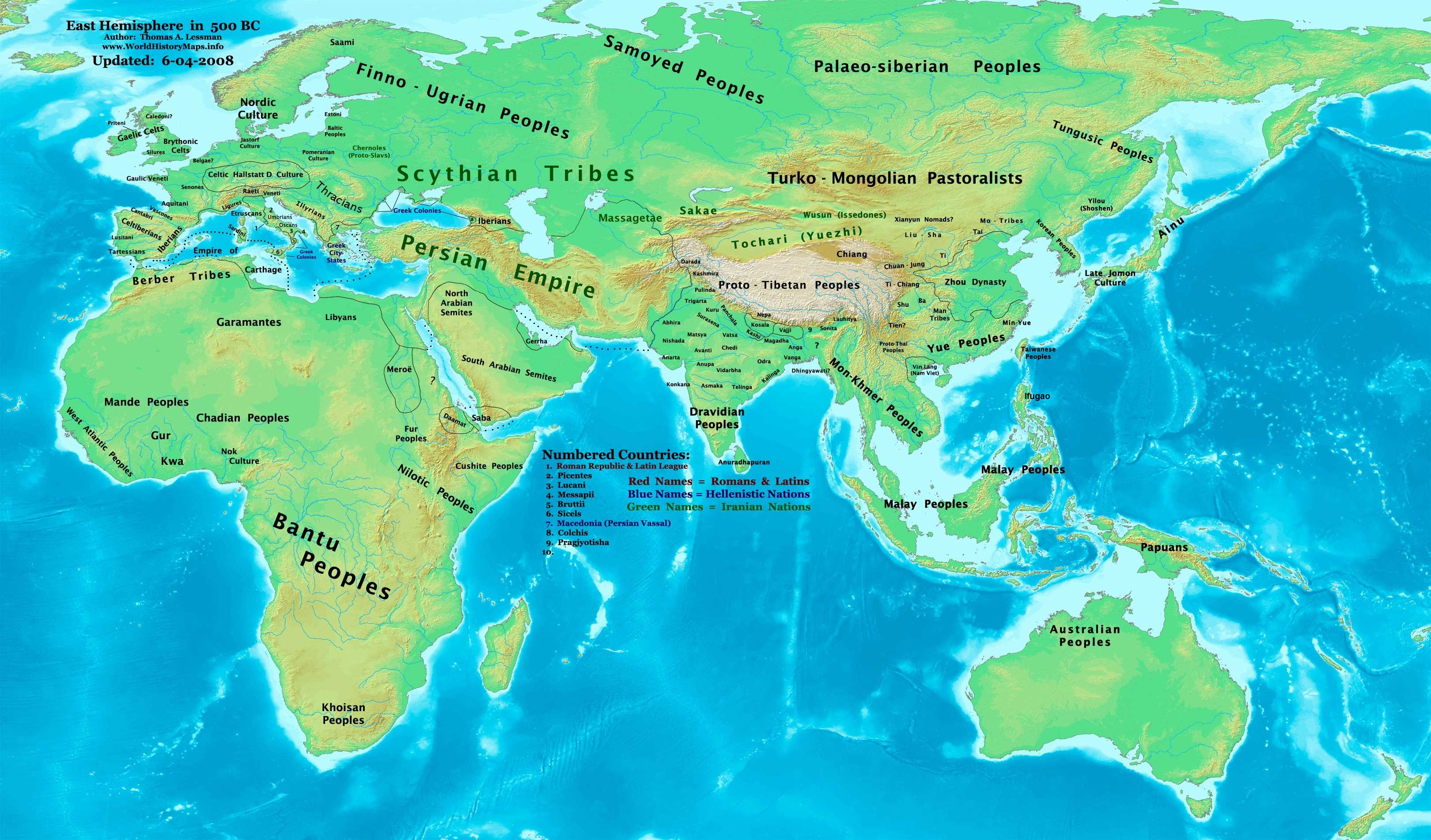
Map of the Eastern Hemisphere in 500 BC, the end of the sixth century BC.

== Events ==
=== 590s BC ===
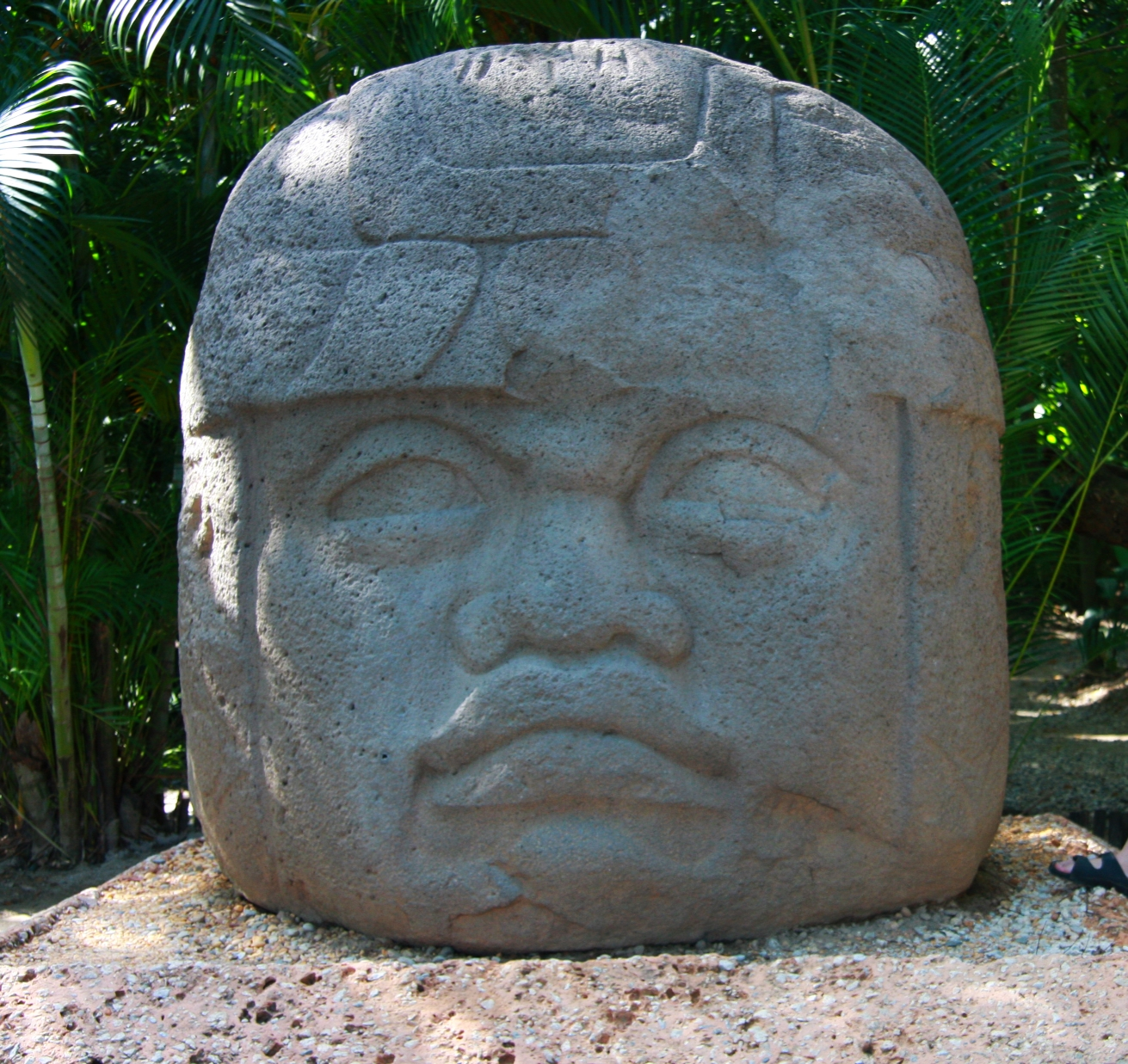
Monument 1, an Olmec colossal head at La Venta

- 598 BC: Jehoiachin succeeds Jehoiakim as King of Judah.
- 16 March 597 BC: Babylonians capture Jerusalem, replace Jehoiachin with Zedekiah as king.
- 595 BC: Psammetichus II succeeds Necho II as King of Egypt.
- 594 BC: Solon appointed Archon of Athens; institutes democratic reforms.
- 590 BC: Egyptian army sacks Napata, compelling the Cushite court to move to a more secure location at Meroe near the sixth Cataract.

=== 580s BC ===
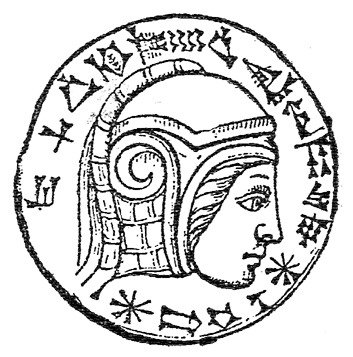
An engraving on an eye stone of onyx with an inscription of Nebuchadnezzar II

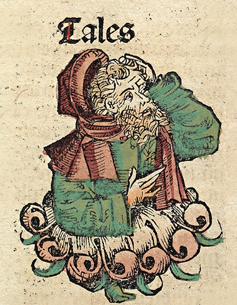
Medieval image of Thales

- 589 BC: Apries succeeds Psammetichus II as King of Egypt.
- 588 BC: Nebuchadrezzar II of Babylon begins siege of Jerusalem; some sources set the date at 587 BC.
- 587 BC/586 BC: Jerusalem falls to the Babylonians, ending the Kingdom of Judah. The conquerors destroy Solomon's Temple and exile the land's remaining inhabitants. Babylonian Captivity for the Jews begins.
- 586 BC: death of King Ding of Zhou, king of the Zhou dynasty of China
- 28 May 585 BC: A solar eclipse occurs as predicted by Thales, while Alyattes is battling Cyaxares. This leads to a truce. This is one of the cardinal dates from which other dates can be calculated.
- 585 BC/584 BC: Astyages succeeds Cyaxares as King of the Medes.
- 585 BC: King Jian of Zhou becomes king of the Zhou dynasty.
- 583 BC: The Babylonians begin a siege against Tyre.
- 582 BC: Pythian Games founded at Delphi (traditional date).
- 580 BC: Cambyses I succeeds Cyrus I as King of Anshan and head of the Achaemenid dynasty (approximate date).
- 580 BC: Isthmian Games founded at Corinth (traditional date)

=== 570s BC ===
- 579 BC: Servius Tullius succeeds the assassinated Lucius Tarquinius Priscus as King of Rome (traditional date).
- 573 BC: Nemean Games founded at Nemea (traditional date).
- 572 BC: Death of King Jian of Zhou, king of the Zhou dynasty of China.
- 571 BC: King Ling of Zhou becomes king of the Zhou dynasty of China.
- 570 BC: Amasis II succeeds Apries as King of Egypt.
- 570 BC: Pythagoras of Samos is born (approximate date).
- 570 BC: End of the Babylonian siege against the city of Tyre with a partial victory by the Babylonians. It was the longest siege of the city in history, lasting 13 years.

=== 560s BC ===
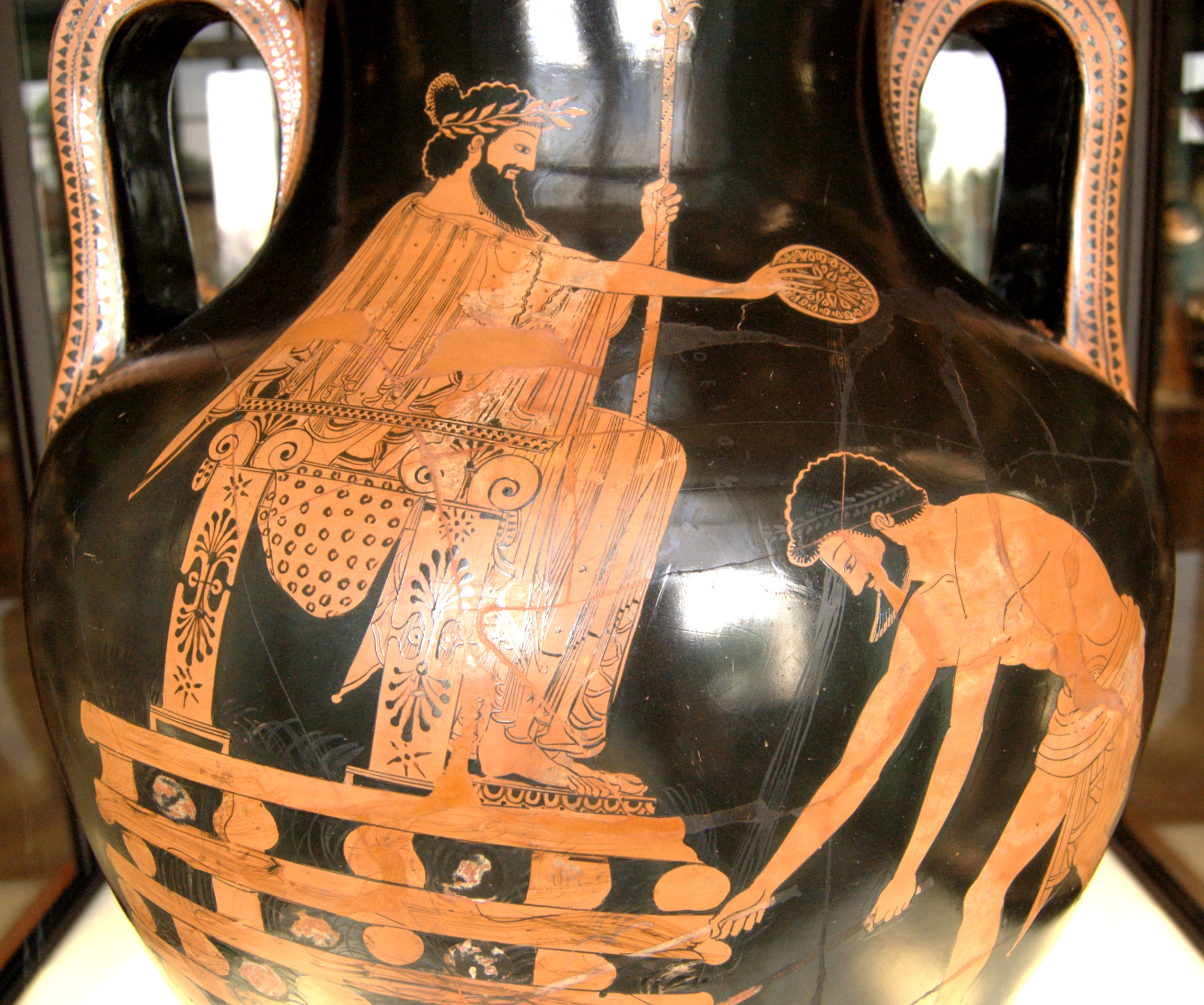
Croesus on the pyre, Attic red-figure amphora

Faravahar, a symbol of Zoroastrianism in Persepolis

- 568 BC: Amtalqa succeeds his brother Aspelta as King of Kush.
- 562 BC: Amel-Marduk succeeds Nebuchadnezzar as King of Babylon.
- 560 BC: Neriglissar succeeds Amel-Marduk as King of Babylon.
- 561 BC/560 BC: Croesus becomes King of Lydia.
- 560 BC: Pisistratus seizes the Acropolis of Athens and declares himself tyrant. He is deposed in the same year.

=== 550s BC ===
- 550s BC: Carthage conquers Sicily, Sardinia and Corsica.
- 559 BC: King Cambyses I of Anshan dies and is succeeded by his son Cyrus II the Great.
- 558 BC: Hegesias removed as Archon of Athens.
- 558 BC: The Chinese state of Jin defeats its rival Qin in battle.
- 556 BC: Pisistratus is exiled from Athens to Euboea.
- 556 BC: Labashi-Marduk succeeds Neriglissar as King of Babylon.
- 556 BC/555 BC: Nabonidus succeeds Labashi-Marduk as King of Babylon.
- 551 BC: Confucius was born.
- 550 BC: Abdera is destroyed by the Thracians.
- 553–550 BC: Medo-Persian conflict; Cyrus II overthrows the Median king Astyages, establishing the Persian Empire.
- 550 BC: The Late Mumun Period begins in the Korean Peninsula.

=== 540s BC ===
- 547 BC: Croesus, Lydian King, is defeated by Cyrus of Persia near the River Halys.
- 546 BC: Cyrus of Persia completes his conquest of Lydia, and makes Pasargadae his capital.
- Mid-6th century BC: Foundation of Temple of Olympian Zeus (Athens) by Pisistratus.
- 544 BC: Bimbisara establishes Haryanka dynasty of Magadha in India.
- 544 BC: People of Teos migrate to Abdera, Thrace to escape the yoke of Persia.
- 544 BC: King Jing of Zhou becomes king of the Zhou dynasty of China.
- 543 BC: Prince Vijaya establishes a Sinhalese dynasty of Sri Lanka.
- 543 BC: Pisistratus, tyrant of Athens, purifies the island of Delos (approximate date).
- 540 BC: Greek city of Elea of southern Italy founded (approximate date).
- 540 BC: Persians conquer Lycian city of Xanthos, now in southern Turkey (approximate date).

=== 530s BC ===
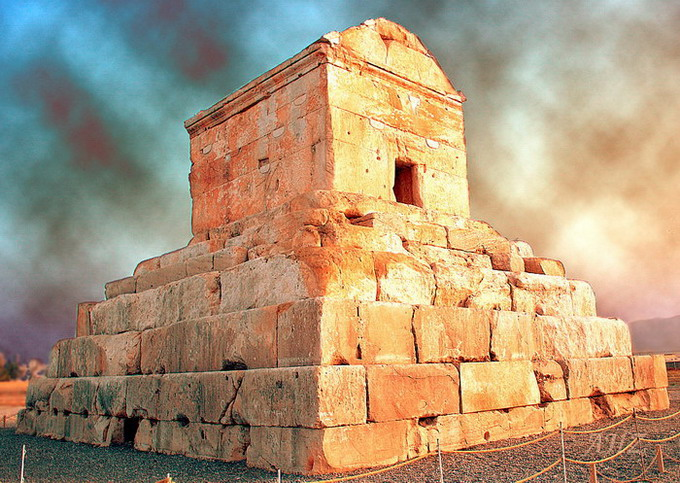
Tomb of Cyrus in Pasargadae

- 539 BC: Babylon is conquered by Cyrus the Great, defeating Nabonidus.
- 538 BC: Return of some Jews from Babylonian exile who build the Second Temple about fifty years after the destruction of the First Temple, from 520 BC–516 BC.
- 537 BC: Jews transported to Babylon are allowed to return to Jerusalem, bringing to a close the Babylonian captivity.
- 536 BC: According to tradition, the Biblical prophet Daniel receives an angelic visit from the archangel Gabriel.
- 534 BC: Lucius Tarquinius Superbus becomes King of Rome.
- 534 BC: Competitions for tragedy are instituted at the City Dionysia festival in Athens.
- 530 BC: Cambyses II succeeds Cyrus as King of Persia.

=== 520s BC ===
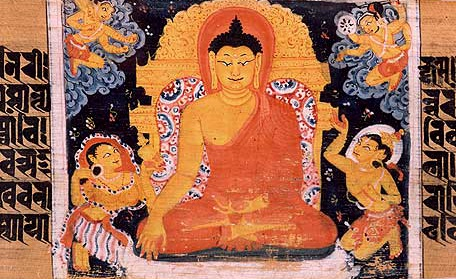
Gautama Buddha

- 528 BC: Gautama Buddha attains Enlightenment, and begins his ministry. He founds Buddhism in India. It becomes a major world religion.
- 526 BC: Psammetichus III succeeds Amasis II as King of Egypt.
- 525 BC: Cambyses II, ruler of Persia, conquers Egypt, defeating Psammetichus III. This is considered the end of the Twenty-sixth Dynasty, and the start of the Twenty-seventh Dynasty.
- 522 BC: Smerdis succeeds Cambyses II as ruler of Persia.
- 522 BC: Babylon rebels against Persian rule.
- 521 BC: Darius I succeeds Smerdis as ruler of Persia.
- 521 BC: The Babylonian rebellion against Persian rule is suppressed
- 520 BC: King Dao of Zhou becomes king of the Zhou dynasty of China but dies before the end of the year
- 520 BC: Start of construction of a colossal new Temple of Olympian Zeus (Athens) by Pisistratus's sons, Hippias and Hipparchos (approximate date).
- 520 BC: Cleomenes I succeeds Anaxandridas II as King of Sparta (approximate date)

=== 510s BC ===
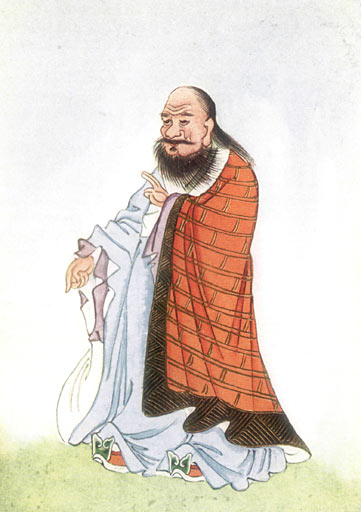
Image of Laozi

- 519 BC: King Jing of Zhou becomes king of the Zhou dynasty of China.
- 516 BC: Indian subcontinent—Occupation of Punjab is completed by the Achaemenid King Darius I.
- 12 March 515 BC: Construction is completed on the Temple in Jerusalem.
- 514 BC: King Helü of Wu establishes the "Great City of Helü", the ancient name for Wuxi, as his capital in China.
- 513 BC: Darius the Great subdues the Getae and east Thrace in his war against the Scythians.
- 512 BC: The Kingdom of Macedonia, under King Amyntas I, becomes a vassal state to the Achaemenid Empire.
- 510 BC: Hippias, son of Pisistratus and tyrant of Athens, is expelled by a popular revolt supported by Cleomenes I, King of Sparta and his forces.
- 510 BC: End of reign of Lucius Tarquinius Superbus, last King of the traditional seven Kings of Rome.
- 510 BC: Establishment of the Roman Republic.
- 510 BC: Demaratus succeeds Ariston as King of Sparta (approximate date).

=== 500s BC ===
- 13 September 509 BC: The Temple of Jupiter on Rome's Capitoline Hill is dedicated on the Ides of September.
- 508 BC: Office of pontifex maximus created in Rome.
- 507 BC: Cleisthenes, Greek reformer, takes power and increases democracy.
- 506 BC: Battle of Boju: Forces of the Kingdom of Wu under Sun Tzu defeat the forces of Chu.
- 505 BC: First pair of Roman consuls elected.
- 4 December 502 BC: Solar eclipse darkens Egypt (computed, no clear historical record of observation).
- 502 BC: The Latin League defeats the Etruscans under Lars Porsena at Aricia.
- 502 BC: Naxos rebels against Persian domination sparking the Ionian Revolt.
- 501 BC: Cleisthenes reforms democracy in Athens.
- 501 BC: Naxos is attacked by the Persian Empire.
- 501 BC: In response to threats by the Sabines, Rome creates the office of dictator.
- 501 BC: Confucius is appointed governor of Chung tu.
- 501 BC: Gadir (present-day Cádiz) is captured by Carthage (approximate date).
- 500 BC: Bantu-speaking people migrate into south-west Uganda from the west (approximate date).
- 500 BC: Refugees from Teos resettle Abdera.
- 500 BC: Darius I of Persia proclaims that Aramaic be the official language of the western half of his empire.
- 500 BC: Signifies the end of the Nordic Bronze Age civilization in Oscar Montelius periodization system and begins the Pre-Roman Iron Age.
- 500 BC: Foundation of first republic in Vaishali Bihar India.
- 500 BC: Sa Huynh-Kalanay Interaction Sphere extensive trade network started between the Sa Huynh and the Philippines and later expanded to Taiwan, Southern Thailand, and northeastern Borneo.

== Inventions, discoveries, introductions ==
- The earliest operation for treating Lithiasis treatment is given in Sushruta Samhita (India).
- First archaeological surveys of the Arabian peninsula by Babylonian King Nabonidus
- Cataract surgery was known to Indian Physician Sushruta.
- Sunshu Ao (孫叔敖), China's first hydraulic engineer, creates an enormous artificial reservoir by damming a river for a massive irrigation project while employed in the service of King Zhuang of Chu (died 591 BC)
- Lost-wax casting is spread to Ancient Greece
- The oldest surviving map of the world, the Imago Mundi, is made in Babylon.
