= 550s BC =

Decade

This article concerns the period 559 BC–550 BC.

== Events and trends ==
- Carthage conquers Sicily, Sardinia, and Corsica.
- 559 BC—King Cambyses I of Anshan dies and is succeeded by his son Cyrus II the Great.
- 558 BC—Hegesias is removed as Archon of Athens.
- 558 BC—The Chinese state of Jin defeats its rival state of Qin in battle.
- 557 BC—The Persians besiege Larissa (Calah) but fail to capture it until a solar eclipse occurs.
- 556 BC—Pisistratus is exiled from Athens to Euboea.
- 556 BC—Labashi-Marduk succeeds Neriglissar as king of Babylon.
- 556 BC—Nabonidus succeeds Labashi-Marduk as king of Babylon.
- c. 550 BC—Colonisation of Greeks ends.
- 550 BC—Abdera is destroyed by the Thracians.
- 550 BC—Mago I begins his rule of Carthage.
- 550 BC—The Temple of Artemis is completed in Ephesus.
- 553-550 BC—Medo-Persian conflict, the Persian king Cyrus II overthrows the Median king Astyages, establishing the First Persian Empire.
- c. 550 BC—The Temple of Hera I is built in what is now Paestum, Italy.
- 550 BC—Siddhartha Gautama founds Buddhism in Northern India after achieving enlightenment after six years of practicing penance and meditation.

== Significant people ==
- 556 BC—Rule of Labashi-Marduk as king of Babylon
- 556 BC—Rule of Nabonidus as king of Babylon
- 558 BC—Death of Solon, Athenian statesman, poet.
- c. 556 BC—Birth of Simonides of Ceos.
- 555 BC—Death of Stesichorus, Greek lyric poet.
- 554 BC—Death of Duke Ling of Qi, ruler of the State of Qi
- September 28, 551 BC—Birth of Confucius, Chinese philosopher (traditional date).
- c. 551 BC—Commonly accepted date of death of Zoroaster, founder of Zoroastrianism.
- 550 BC—Birth of Epicharmus, Greek poet (d. 460 BC).
