= 510s BC =

Decade

This article concerns the period 519 BC – 510 BC.

== Events and trends ==
- 519 BC—Zhou Jing Wang becomes king of the Zhou dynasty of China.
- c. 518 BC—Darius I began construction of Parsa (Persepolis).
- 518 BC—Construction of Apadana of Darius and Xerxes, ceremonial complex, at Persepolis, Iran started.
- 516 BC—Indian subcontinent—The occupation of Punjab is completed by the Persian King Darius I.
- 516 BC—Construction is completed on the Second Temple in Jerusalem.
- c. 515 BC—Euphronios completes Death of Sarpedon, a red-figure decoration on a calyx krater. Euxitheos is a potter. It is now at The Metropolitan Museum of Art, New York.
- 514 BC—King Helü of Wu ascends to the throne of Wu in China during the Zhou dynasty. He established the "Great City of Helu", the ancient name for Suzhou, as his capital.
- 514 BC—Darius I led his Persian army over the Bosphorus and campaigned unsuccessfully against the Scythians on the Danube.
- 513 BC—Darius I subdues the Getae and east Thrace in his war against the Scythians.
- c. 513 BC—Western India becomes the Achaemenid satrapy of Hindush, which included the valley of the Indus River.
- c. 512 BC—Sun Tzu, author of The Art of War, begins serving Helü of Wu as general and military strategist in the Wu army.
- 510 BC—Hippias, second son of Pisistratus and tyrant of Athens, is expelled by a popular revolt supported by Cleomenes I, King of Sparta and his forces.
- 510 BC—End of reign of Lucius Tarquinius Superbus, last king of the traditional seven Kings of Rome.
- 510 BC—Fall of the Roman Kingdom and establishment of the Roman Republic.
- 510 BC—Demaratus succeeds Ariston as king of Sparta. (approximate date)
- 510 BC—Defeat and destruction of Sybaris.
- c. 510 BC–430 BC—Stelae were banned in Athenian cemeteries.

== Births ==
- c. 519 BC—Xerxes I of Persia

== Deaths ==
- King Liao of Wu, China
- Zhuan Zhu, assassin, China (executed)
