= Kymnissa =

Town of ancient Caria

Coordinates: 37°00′31″N 27°16′25″E

Kymnissa was a town of ancient Caria, near Termera. The name does not occur in ancient authors but is derived from epigraphic evidence.

Its site is located near Akçe Köy, Asiatic Turkey.
