= 521st =

521st may refer to:

- 521st Air Defense Group, disbanded United States Air Force organization
- 521st Air Mobility Operations Wing (521 AMOW), part of Air Mobility Command, stationed at Ramstein Air Base, Germany
- 521st Fighter-Bomber Squadron, inactive United States Air Force unit

== See also ==
- 521 (number)
- 521, the year 521 (DXXI) of the Julian calendar
- 521 BC
