= 556 (disambiguation) =

556 is the year 556 AD.

556 may also refer to:

- 556 (number)
- 556 BC
- German submarine U-556
- 5.56mm or 5.56×45mm NATO, a common rifle cartridge
- Sig 556, a commercial variant of the Sig SG 551 rifle designed for the American civilian market
- 5-56, a popular brand of penetrating oil
- 556 dual timer, an integrated circuit
- 556, a fictional character in the Sgt. Frog series
