= 513th =

513th may refer to:

- 513th Air Control Group, United States Air Force Reserve unit assigned to Tinker AFB, Oklahoma
- 513th Electronic Warfare Squadron, United States Air Force unit assigned to the 53d Electronic Warfare Group at Eglin Air Force Base, Florida
- 513th Fighter-Interceptor Squadron, inactive United States Air Force unit
- 513th Parachute Infantry Regiment (United States) (513th PIR), regiment of the 17th Airborne Division of the United States Army
- 513th Troop Carrier Group, wing of the United States Air Force assigned to Wright-Patterson Air Force Base, Ohio

== See also ==
- 513 (number)
- 513, the year 513 (DXIII) of the Julian calendar
- 513 BC
