= 501 BC =

501 BC in various calendars
- Gregorian calendar: 501 BC; DI BC
- Ab urbe condita: 253
- Ancient Egypt era: XXVII dynasty, 25
- Pharaoh: Darius I of Persia, 21
- Ancient Greek Olympiad (summer): 69th Olympiad, year 4
- Assyrian calendar: 4250
- Balinese saka calendar: N/A
- Bengali calendar: −1094 – −1093
- Berber calendar: 450
- Buddhist calendar: 44
- Burmese calendar: −1138
- Byzantine calendar: 5008–5009
- Chinese calendar: 己亥年 (Earth Pig); 2197 or 1990 — to — 庚子年 (Metal Rat); 2198 or 1991
- Coptic calendar: −784 – −783
- Discordian calendar: 666
- Ethiopian calendar: −508 – −507
- Hebrew calendar: 3260–3261
- Hindu calendars
- Vikram Samvat: −444 – −443
- Shaka Samvat: N/A
- Kali Yuga: 2600–2601
- Holocene calendar: 9500
- Iranian calendar: 1122 BP – 1121 BP
- Islamic calendar: 1156 BH – 1155 BH
- Javanese calendar: N/A
- Julian calendar: N/A
- Korean calendar: 1833
- Minguo calendar: 2412 before ROC 民前2412年
- Nanakshahi calendar: −1968
- Thai solar calendar: 42–43
- Tibetan calendar: ས་མོ་ཕག་ལོ་ (female Earth-Boar) −374 or −755 or −1527 — to — ལྕགས་ཕོ་བྱི་བ་ལོ་ (male Iron-Rat) −373 or −754 or −1526

The year 501 BC was a year of the pre-Julian Roman calendar. In the Roman Empire it was known as the Year of the Consulship of Auruncus and Lartius (or, less frequently, year 253 Ab urbe condita). The denomination 501 BC for this year has been used since the early medieval period, when the Anno Domini calendar era became the prevalent method in Europe for naming years.

== Events ==
=== By place ===
==== Mediterranean ====
- Cleisthenes reforms the democracy in Athens.
- In response to threats by the Sabines, Rome creates the office of dictator.
- Gadir (present-day Cádiz) is captured by Carthage. (approximate date)

==== Asia ====
- Confucius is appointed governor of Chung-tu.

== Deaths ==
- Duke Ai of Qin, ruler of the State of Qin from 537 to 501 BC
- Deng Xi, Chinese philosopher
