= 450 BC =

450 BC in various calendars
- Gregorian calendar: 450 BC; CDL BC
- Ab urbe condita: 304
- Ancient Egypt era: XXVII dynasty, 76
- Pharaoh: Artaxerxes I of Persia, 16
- Ancient Greek Olympiad (summer): 82nd Olympiad, year 3
- Assyrian calendar: 4301
- Balinese saka calendar: N/A
- Bengali calendar: −1043 – −1042
- Berber calendar: 501
- Buddhist calendar: 95
- Burmese calendar: −1087
- Byzantine calendar: 5059–5060
- Chinese calendar: 庚寅年 (Metal Tiger); 2248 or 2041 — to — 辛卯年 (Metal Rabbit); 2249 or 2042
- Coptic calendar: −733 – −732
- Discordian calendar: 717
- Ethiopian calendar: −457 – −456
- Hebrew calendar: 3311–3312
- Hindu calendars
- Vikram Samvat: −393 – −392
- Shaka Samvat: N/A
- Kali Yuga: 2651–2652
- Holocene calendar: 9551
- Iranian calendar: 1071 BP – 1070 BP
- Islamic calendar: 1104 BH – 1103 BH
- Javanese calendar: N/A
- Julian calendar: N/A
- Korean calendar: 1884
- Minguo calendar: 2361 before ROC 民前2361年
- Nanakshahi calendar: −1917
- Thai solar calendar: 93–94
- Tibetan calendar: ལྕགས་ཕོ་སྟག་ལོ་ (male Iron-Tiger) −323 or −704 or −1476 — to — ལྕགས་མོ་ཡོས་ལོ་ (female Iron-Hare) −322 or −703 or −1475

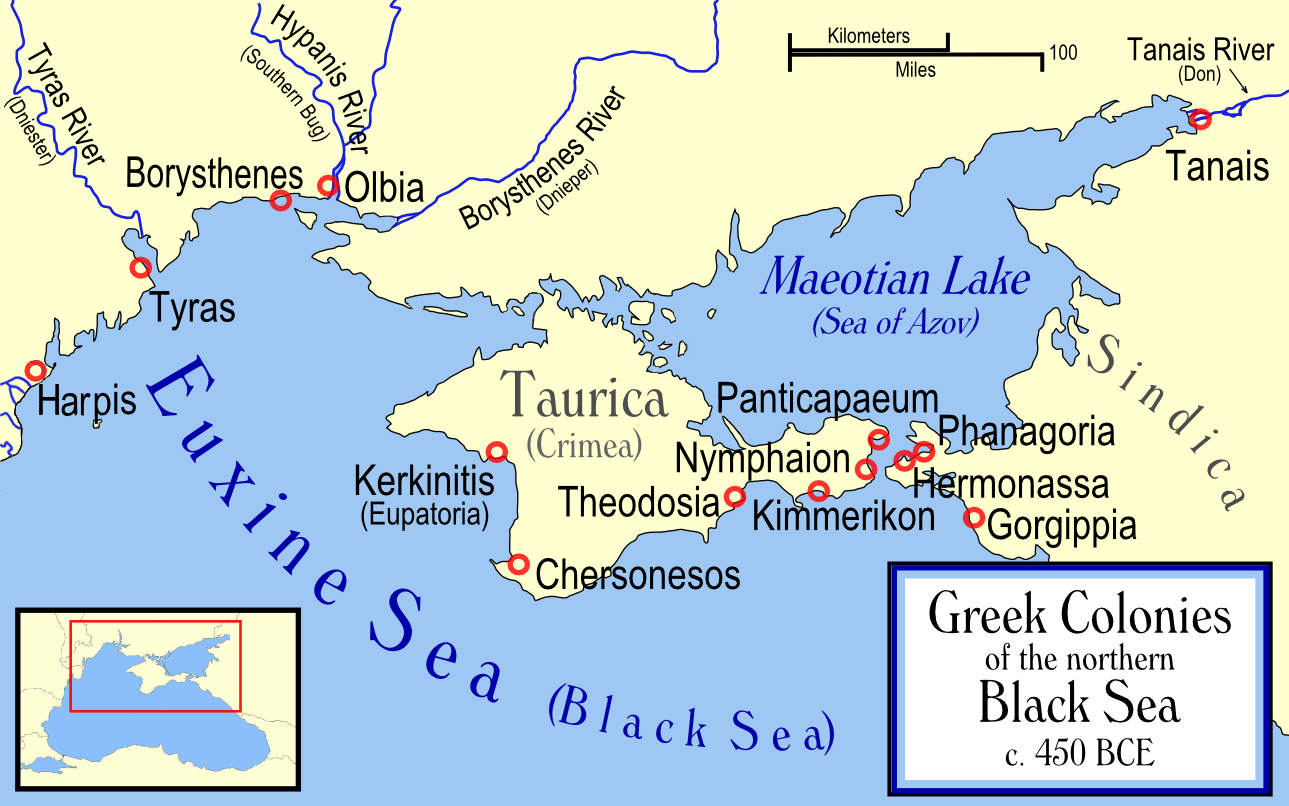
Greek colonies in the northern part of the Black Sea in 450 BC.

Year 450 BC was a year of the pre-Julian Roman calendar. At the time, it was known as the Second year of the decemviri (or, less frequently, year 304 Ab urbe condita). The denomination 450 BC for this year has been used since the early medieval period, when the Anno Domini calendar era became the prevalent method in Europe for naming years.

== Events ==
=== By place ===
==== Greece ====
- Athenian general Cimon sails to Cyprus with two hundred triremes of the Delian League. From there, he sends sixty ships to Egypt to help the Egyptians under Amyrtaeus, who are fighting the Persians in the Nile Delta. Cimon uses the remaining ships to aid an uprising of the Cypriot Greek city-states against Persian control of the island. He lays siege to the Persian stronghold of Citium on the southern west coast of Cyprus. However, the siege fails and Cyprus remains under Phoenician (and Persian) control.
- During the siege Cimon dies and command of the fleet is given to Anaxicrates, who leaves Citium to engage the Phoenician fleet in the Battle of Salamis in Cyprus. The Greek fleet is victorious against the Persians and their allies and then returns to Athens.
- The Athenians reduce the tribute due from their subject city-states (i.e. members of the Delian League), and each city is allowed to issue its own coinage.
- 5,000 talents are transferred to the treasury of the Delian League in Athens.

==== Macedonia ====
- Perdiccas II succeeds Alexander I as king of Macedonia (approximate date).

==== Roman Republic ====
- The success of the first Decemvirate prompts the appointment of a second Decemvirate which also includes plebeians amongst its members. This second decemviri adds two more headings to their predecessor's ten, completing the Law of the Twelve Tables (Lex Duodecim Tabularum), which will form the centrepiece of Roman law for the next several centuries. Nevertheless, this Decemvirate's rule becomes increasingly violent and tyrannical.

==== Sicily ====
- After minor preliminary successes (including the capture of Inessa from its Greek colonists), Ducetius, a Hellenised leader of the Siculi, an ancient people of Sicily, is decisively defeated by the combined forces of Syracuse and Acragas. Ducetius flees to exile in Corinth.

=== By topic ===
==== Arts ====
- The Severe (Early Classical) period of sculpture ends in Ancient Greece and is succeeded by the Mature Classical period (approximate date).
- Polykleitos of Argos develops a set of rules (The Canon) for constructing the ideal human figure (approximate date).
- Polygnotos of Thasos ceases his work (approximate date).
- The old bouleuterion, the west side of the agora in Athens, is built (approximate date).
- Polykleitos starts making the bronze statue Achilles (also known as The Spear Bearer or Doryphoros), which he finishes about ten years later. A Roman copy of the original bronze is now kept in the Museo Archeologico Nazionale in Naples, Italy (approximate date).
- The grave stela from Paros, Little girl with a bird, is made. It is now kept at The Metropolitan Museum of Art in New York (approximate date).
- The statue Woman and maid in the style of Achilles Painter, white-ground and black-figure decoration on a lekythos, with additional painting in tempera, starts being made (finished about ten years later). It is now kept at the Museum of Fine Arts in Boston (approximate date).
- Myron makes a bronze statue called The Discus Thrower (Discobolus). A Roman copy is now kept at Museo Nazionale Romano, Rome (approximate date).
- The Corinthian order makes its first appearance in Greek architecture (approximate date).
- The red-figure decorations A Painter, Assistants Crowned by Athena and Victories are made on a hydria in Athens. They are now kept in a private collection (approximate date).

== Births ==
- Alcibiades, Athenian general and politician (d. 404 BC)
- Aristophanes, Greek playwright (approximate year)

== Deaths ==
- Cimon, Athenian statesman and general (b. c. 510 BC)
- Alexander I, king of Macedonia (approximate date)
