= 535 BC =

535 BC in various calendars
- Gregorian calendar: 535 BC; DXXXV BC
- Ab urbe condita: 219
- Ancient Egypt era: XXVI dynasty, 130
- Pharaoh: Amasis II, 36
- Ancient Greek Olympiad (summer): 61st Olympiad, year 2
- Assyrian calendar: 4216
- Balinese saka calendar: N/A
- Bengali calendar: −1128 – −1127
- Berber calendar: 416
- Buddhist calendar: 10
- Burmese calendar: −1172
- Byzantine calendar: 4974–4975
- Chinese calendar: 乙丑年 (Wood Ox); 2163 or 1956 — to — 丙寅年 (Fire Tiger); 2164 or 1957
- Coptic calendar: −818 – −817
- Discordian calendar: 632
- Ethiopian calendar: −542 – −541
- Hebrew calendar: 3226–3227
- Hindu calendars
- Vikram Samvat: −478 – −477
- Shaka Samvat: N/A
- Kali Yuga: 2566–2567
- Holocene calendar: 9466
- Iranian calendar: 1156 BP – 1155 BP
- Islamic calendar: 1192 BH – 1190 BH
- Javanese calendar: N/A
- Julian calendar: N/A
- Korean calendar: 1799
- Minguo calendar: 2446 before ROC 民前2446年
- Nanakshahi calendar: −2002
- Thai solar calendar: 8–9
- Tibetan calendar: ཤིང་མོ་གླང་ལོ་ (female Wood-Ox) −408 or −789 or −1561 — to — མེ་ཕོ་སྟག་ལོ་ (male Fire-Tiger) −407 or −788 or −1560

The year 535 BC was a year of the pre-Julian Roman calendar. In the Roman Empire, it was known as year 219 Ab urbe condita. The denomination 535 BC for this year has been used since the early medieval period, when the Anno Domini calendar era became the prevalent method in Europe for naming years.

== Events ==
=== By place ===
==== Europe ====
- Phocaean Greek colonists clash with Carthaginian and Etruscan ships in the Battle of Alalia (near Corsica).

==== Asia ====
- The Sungai Batu Civilization in Malaysia begins.

== Births ==
- Heraclitus, Greek philosopher (approximate date) (d. c. 475 BC)
