= 554 BC =

554 BC in various calendars
- Gregorian calendar: 554 BC; DLIV BC
- Ab urbe condita: 200
- Ancient Egypt era: XXVI dynasty, 111
- Pharaoh: Amasis II, 17
- Ancient Greek Olympiad (summer): 56th Olympiad, year 3
- Assyrian calendar: 4197
- Balinese saka calendar: N/A
- Bengali calendar: −1147 – −1146
- Berber calendar: 397
- Buddhist calendar: −9
- Burmese calendar: −1191
- Byzantine calendar: 4955–4956
- Chinese calendar: 丙午年 (Fire Horse); 2144 or 1937 — to — 丁未年 (Fire Goat); 2145 or 1938
- Coptic calendar: −837 – −836
- Discordian calendar: 613
- Ethiopian calendar: −561 – −560
- Hebrew calendar: 3207–3208
- Hindu calendars
- Vikram Samvat: −497 – −496
- Shaka Samvat: N/A
- Kali Yuga: 2547–2548
- Holocene calendar: 9447
- Iranian calendar: 1175 BP – 1174 BP
- Islamic calendar: 1211 BH – 1210 BH
- Javanese calendar: N/A
- Julian calendar: N/A
- Korean calendar: 1780
- Minguo calendar: 2465 before ROC 民前2465年
- Nanakshahi calendar: −2021
- Thai solar calendar: −11 – −10
- Tibetan calendar: མེ་ཕོ་རྟ་ལོ་ (male Fire-Horse) −427 or −808 or −1580 — to — མེ་མོ་ལུག་ལོ་ (female Fire-Sheep) −426 or −807 or −1579

The year 554 BC was a year of the pre-Julian Roman calendar. In the Roman Empire, it was known as year 200 Ab urbe condita. The denomination 554 BC for this year has been used since the early medieval period, when the Anno Domini calendar era became the prevalent method in Europe for naming years.

== Deaths ==
- Duke Ling of Qi, ruler of the State of Qi
