= 580s BC =

Decade

This article concerns the period 589 BC – 580 BC.

== Events and trends ==
- February 589 BC—Apries succeeds Psamtik II as king of Egypt.
- 589 BC—Nebuchadnezzar II begins his second siege of Jerusalem.
- 589 BC—Battle of An: Jin defeats Qi; these two Chinese states later agree to an alliance.
- 15 January 588 BC—The last phase of Siege of Jerusalem began.
- 587/586 BC—Jerusalem falls to the Babylonians, ending the Kingdom of Judah. The conquerors destroy the Jewish Temple of Jerusalem and exile some of the land's inhabitants.
- 586 BC—Death of King Ding of the Zhou dynasty of China.
- 28 May 585 BC—A solar eclipse occurs while Alyattes of Lydia fights Cyaxares of Media at a battle on the Halys river, leading to a truce. This is a cardinal date from which other dates can be calculated.
- 585 BC—Kirrha is destroyed, ending the First Sacred War.
- 585 BC—Lucius Tarquinius Priscus, king of Rome, defeats the Sabines in war, takes the town of Collatia, and celebrates a triumph for his victories on 13 September.
- 585 BC—King Jian of Zhou succeeds King Ding of Zhou as the emperor of the Zhou dynasty.
- 585 BC—Fall of the Kingdom of Urartu following a Median invasion. (The Scythians ruined the Kingdom of Urartu.)
- 585 BC—Croesus succeeds Alyattes as King of Lydia.
- 585 BC—Astyages succeeds Cyaxares as King of the Medes.
- 582 BC—Military clash between Egypt and Babylon.
- 582 BC—Akragas is founded on Sicily.
- 582 BC—Nebuchadnezzar II forces a third deportation of Jews from Judah into Babylonian captivity.
- 582 BC—The Pythian Games are reorganised at Delphi (traditional date).
- 581 BC—The Isthmian Games are founded at Corinth.
- 581 BC—Suizei becomes the second Emperor of Japan.
- 580 BC—Cambyses I succeeds Cyrus I as king of Anshan and head of the Achaemenid dynasty.
- c. 580 BC—The Temple of Artemis, Corfu, is built.
- c. 580 BC—The Hecatompedon, a temple dedicated to Athena in Athens, was built at the site later used for the Parthenon.

== Births ==
- 586 BC—Duke Dao of Jin, ruler of the State of Jin (d. 558 BC)
- 586/585 BC—Anaximenes of Miletus, Greek philosopher (died 526/525 BC)

== Deaths ==
- 589 BC—Psamtik II
- 586 BC—King Ding of Zhou, king of the Zhou dynasty of China
- April 9, 585 BC—Emperor Jimmu of Japan (according to legend)
- 585 BC—King Cyaxares of Media
- 585 BC—King Alyattes of Lydia
- 585 BC—Rusa IV of Urartu
- 585 BC—Nitocris I, Egyptian priestess
- 582 BC—Duke Qing of Qi
- 581 BC—Duke Jing of Jin
- 580 BC—Cyrus I of Anshan
