= 553 BC =

553 BC in various calendars
- Gregorian calendar: 553 BC; DLIII BC
- Ab urbe condita: 201
- Ancient Egypt era: XXVI dynasty, 112
- Pharaoh: Amasis II, 18
- Ancient Greek Olympiad (summer): 56th Olympiad, year 4
- Assyrian calendar: 4198
- Balinese saka calendar: N/A
- Bengali calendar: −1146 – −1145
- Berber calendar: 398
- Buddhist calendar: −8
- Burmese calendar: −1190
- Byzantine calendar: 4956–4957
- Chinese calendar: 丁未年 (Fire Goat); 2145 or 1938 — to — 戊申年 (Earth Monkey); 2146 or 1939
- Coptic calendar: −836 – −835
- Discordian calendar: 614
- Ethiopian calendar: −560 – −559
- Hebrew calendar: 3208–3209
- Hindu calendars
- Vikram Samvat: −496 – −495
- Shaka Samvat: N/A
- Kali Yuga: 2548–2549
- Holocene calendar: 9448
- Iranian calendar: 1174 BP – 1173 BP
- Islamic calendar: 1210 BH – 1209 BH
- Javanese calendar: N/A
- Julian calendar: N/A
- Korean calendar: 1781
- Minguo calendar: 2464 before ROC 民前2464年
- Nanakshahi calendar: −2020
- Thai solar calendar: −10 – −9
- Tibetan calendar: མེ་མོ་ལུག་ལོ་ (female Fire-Sheep) −426 or −807 or −1579 — to — ས་ཕོ་སྤྲེ་ལོ་ (male Earth-Monkey) −425 or −806 or −1578

The year 553 BC was a year of the pre-Julian Roman calendar. In the Roman Empire, it was known as year 201 Ab urbe condita. The denomination 553 BC for this year has been used since the early medieval period, when the Anno Domini calendar era became the prevalent method in Europe for naming years.

== Events ==
- Cyrus II of Persia revolts against Astyages of the Medes.

== Births ==
- Itoku, emperor of Japan (d. 477 BC)
