= 557 BC =

557 BC in various calendars
- Gregorian calendar: 557 BC; DLVII BC
- Ab urbe condita: 197
- Ancient Egypt era: XXVI dynasty, 108
- Pharaoh: Amasis II, 14
- Ancient Greek Olympiad (summer): 55th Olympiad, year 4
- Assyrian calendar: 4194
- Balinese saka calendar: N/A
- Bengali calendar: −1150 – −1149
- Berber calendar: 394
- Buddhist calendar: −12
- Burmese calendar: −1194
- Byzantine calendar: 4952–4953
- Chinese calendar: 癸卯年 (Water Rabbit); 2141 or 1934 — to — 甲辰年 (Wood Dragon); 2142 or 1935
- Coptic calendar: −840 – −839
- Discordian calendar: 610
- Ethiopian calendar: −564 – −563
- Hebrew calendar: 3204–3205
- Hindu calendars
- Vikram Samvat: −500 – −499
- Shaka Samvat: N/A
- Kali Yuga: 2544–2545
- Holocene calendar: 9444
- Iranian calendar: 1178 BP – 1177 BP
- Islamic calendar: 1214 BH – 1213 BH
- Javanese calendar: N/A
- Julian calendar: N/A
- Korean calendar: 1777
- Minguo calendar: 2468 before ROC 民前2468年
- Nanakshahi calendar: −2024
- Thai solar calendar: −14 – −13
- Tibetan calendar: ཆུ་མོ་ཡོས་ལོ་ (female Water-Hare) −430 or −811 or −1583 — to — ཤིང་ཕོ་འབྲུག་ལོ་ (male Wood-Dragon) −429 or −810 or −1582

The year 557 BC was a year of the pre-Julian Roman calendar. In the Roman Empire, it was known as year 197 Ab urbe condita. The denomination 557 BC for this year has been used since the early medieval period, when the Anno Domini calendar era became the prevalent method in Europe for naming years.

== Events ==
- May 19: The Persians besiege Larissa (Calah) but fail to capture it. However, when a solar eclipse occurs, the inhabitants leave their city and it is taken.
- Labashi-Marduk is king of Babylon during this year, succeeding Neriglissar, who reigned three years, and is followed by Nabonidus, who reigns 17 years.
- Santorini, Greece suffers from a volcanic eruption.

== Births ==
- Siddharta Gautama, also known as the Buddha (year of birth not precisely known)
