= 534 BC =

534 BC in various calendars
Gregorian calendar	534 BC; DXXXIV BC
Ab urbe condita	220
Ancient Egypt era	XXVI dynasty, 131
Pharaoh	Amasis II, 37
Ancient Greek Olympiad (summer)	61st Olympiad, year 3
Assyrian calendar	4217
Balinese saka calendar	N/A
Bengali calendar	−1127 – −1126
Berber calendar	417
Buddhist calendar	11
Burmese calendar	−1171
Byzantine calendar	4975–4976
Chinese calendar	丙寅年 (Fire Tiger); 2164 or 1957 — to — 丁卯年 (Fire Rabbit); 2165 or 1958
Coptic calendar	−817 – −816
Discordian calendar	633
Ethiopian calendar	−541 – −540
Hebrew calendar	3227–3228
- Hindu calendars
Vikram Samvat	−477 – −476
Shaka Samvat	N/A
Kali Yuga	2567–2568
Holocene calendar	9467
Iranian calendar	1155 BP – 1154 BP
Islamic calendar	1190 BH – 1189 BH
Javanese calendar	N/A
Julian calendar	N/A
Korean calendar	1800
Minguo calendar	2445 before ROC 民前2445年
Nanakshahi calendar	−2001
Thai solar calendar	9–10
Tibetan calendar	མེ་ཕོ་སྟག་ལོ་ (male Fire-Tiger) −407 or −788 or −1560 — to — མེ་མོ་ཡོས་ལོ་ (female Fire-Hare) −406 or −787 or −1559

The year 534 BC was a year of the pre-Julian Roman calendar. In the Roman Empire, it was known as year 220 Ab urbe condita. The denomination 534 BC for this year has been used since the early medieval period, when the Anno Domini calendar era became the prevalent method in Europe for naming years.

== Events ==
=== By place ===
==== Europe ====
- Lucius Tarquinius Superbus becomes the seventh king of Rome, after murdering his predecessor Servius Tullius.
- Competitions for tragedy are instituted at the City Dionysia festival in Athens.
- The Etruscan founded the city of Felsina, that later will become the modern city of Bologna.

== Deaths ==
- Servius Tullius, sixth king of Rome
