= 502 BC =

502 BC in various calendars
Gregorian calendar	502 BC; DII BC
Ab urbe condita	252
Ancient Egypt era	XXVII dynasty, 24
Pharaoh	Darius I of Persia, 20
Ancient Greek Olympiad (summer)	69th Olympiad, year 3
Assyrian calendar	4249
Balinese saka calendar	N/A
Bengali calendar	−1095 – −1094
Berber calendar	449
Buddhist calendar	43
Burmese calendar	−1139
Byzantine calendar	5007–5008
Chinese calendar	戊戌年 (Earth Dog); 2196 or 1989 — to — 己亥年 (Earth Pig); 2197 or 1990
Coptic calendar	−785 – −784
Discordian calendar	665
Ethiopian calendar	−509 – −508
Hebrew calendar	3259–3260
- Hindu calendars
Vikram Samvat	−445 – −444
Shaka Samvat	N/A
Kali Yuga	2599–2600
Holocene calendar	9499
Iranian calendar	1123 BP – 1122 BP
Islamic calendar	1158 BH – 1156 BH
Javanese calendar	N/A
Julian calendar	N/A
Korean calendar	1832
Minguo calendar	2413 before ROC 民前2413年
Nanakshahi calendar	−1969
Thai solar calendar	41–42
Tibetan calendar	ས་ཕོ་ཁྱི་ལོ་ (male Earth-Dog) −375 or −756 or −1528 — to — ས་མོ་ཕག་ལོ་ (female Earth-Boar) −374 or −755 or −1527

The year 502 BC was a year of the pre-Julian Roman calendar. In the Roman Empire it was known as the Year of the Consulship of Tricostus and Viscellinus (or, less frequently, year 252 Ab urbe condita). The denomination 502 BC for this year has been used since the early medieval period, when the Anno Domini calendar era became the prevalent method in Europe for naming years.

== Events ==
=== By place ===
==== Mediterranean ====
- The island of Naxos rebels against the Persian Empire.
- Rome suppresses the Pometian revolt.
- December 4—A solar eclipse darkens Egypt (computed, no clear historical record of observation).

== Deaths ==
- Milo of Croton, ancient Greek wrestler
