= 561 BC =

561 BC in various calendars
- Gregorian calendar: 561 BC; DLXI BC
- Ab urbe condita: 193
- Ancient Egypt era: XXVI dynasty, 104
- Pharaoh: Amasis II, 10
- Ancient Greek Olympiad (summer): 54th Olympiad, year 4
- Assyrian calendar: 4190
- Balinese saka calendar: N/A
- Bengali calendar: −1154 – −1153
- Berber calendar: 390
- Buddhist calendar: −16
- Burmese calendar: −1198
- Byzantine calendar: 4948–4949
- Chinese calendar: 己亥年 (Earth Pig); 2137 or 1930 — to — 庚子年 (Metal Rat); 2138 or 1931
- Coptic calendar: −844 – −843
- Discordian calendar: 606
- Ethiopian calendar: −568 – −567
- Hebrew calendar: 3200–3201
- Hindu calendars
- Vikram Samvat: −504 – −503
- Shaka Samvat: N/A
- Kali Yuga: 2540–2541
- Holocene calendar: 9440
- Iranian calendar: 1182 BP – 1181 BP
- Islamic calendar: 1218 BH – 1217 BH
- Javanese calendar: N/A
- Julian calendar: N/A
- Korean calendar: 1773
- Minguo calendar: 2472 before ROC 民前2472年
- Nanakshahi calendar: −2028
- Thai solar calendar: −18 – −17
- Tibetan calendar: ས་མོ་ཕག་ལོ་ (female Earth-Boar) −434 or −815 or −1587 — to — ལྕགས་ཕོ་བྱི་བ་ལོ་ (male Iron-Rat) −433 or −814 or −1586

The year 561 BC was a year of the pre-Julian Roman calendar. In the Roman Empire, it was known as year 193 Ab urbe condita. The denomination 561 BC for this year has been used since the early medieval period, when the Anno Domini calendar era became the prevalent method in Europe for naming years.

== Events ==
- Croesus becomes king of Lydia (or 560 BC).
- All eight solar system planets, including the now redefined dwarf planet Pluto, fall into planetary alignment.

== Deaths ==
- Alyattes, king of Lydia (or 560 BC)
- Zedekiah, king of Judah
