= 505 BC =

505 BC in various calendars
- Gregorian calendar: 505 BC; DV BC
- Ab urbe condita: 249
- Ancient Egypt era: XXVII dynasty, 21
- Pharaoh: Darius I of Persia, 17
- Ancient Greek Olympiad (summer): 68th Olympiad, year 4
- Assyrian calendar: 4246
- Balinese saka calendar: N/A
- Bengali calendar: −1098 – −1097
- Berber calendar: 446
- Buddhist calendar: 40
- Burmese calendar: −1142
- Byzantine calendar: 5004–5005
- Chinese calendar: 乙未年 (Wood Goat); 2193 or 1986 — to — 丙申年 (Fire Monkey); 2194 or 1987
- Coptic calendar: −788 – −787
- Discordian calendar: 662
- Ethiopian calendar: −512 – −511
- Hebrew calendar: 3256–3257
- Hindu calendars
- Vikram Samvat: −448 – −447
- Shaka Samvat: N/A
- Kali Yuga: 2596–2597
- Holocene calendar: 9496
- Iranian calendar: 1126 BP – 1125 BP
- Islamic calendar: 1161 BH – 1160 BH
- Javanese calendar: N/A
- Julian calendar: N/A
- Korean calendar: 1829
- Minguo calendar: 2416 before ROC 民前2416年
- Nanakshahi calendar: −1972
- Thai solar calendar: 38–39
- Tibetan calendar: ཤིང་མོ་ལུག་ལོ་ (female Wood-Sheep) −378 or −759 or −1531 — to — མེ་ཕོ་སྤྲེ་ལོ་ (male Fire-Monkey) −377 or −758 or −1530

The year 505 BC was a year of the pre-Julian Roman calendar. In the Roman Empire it was known as the Year of the Consulship of Volusus and Tubertus (or, less frequently, year 249 Ab urbe condita). The denomination 505 BC for this year has been used since the early medieval period, when the Anno Domini calendar era became the prevalent method in Europe for naming years.

== Events ==
=== By place ===
==== Roman Republic ====
- A war between Rome and the Sabines begins, concluding in 504 BC.
