= 537 BC =

537 BC in various calendars
- Gregorian calendar: 537 BC; DXXXVII BC
- Ab urbe condita: 217
- Ancient Egypt era: XXVI dynasty, 128
- Pharaoh: Amasis II, 34
- Ancient Greek Olympiad (summer): 60th Olympiad, year 4
- Assyrian calendar: 4214
- Balinese saka calendar: N/A
- Bengali calendar: −1130 – −1129
- Berber calendar: 414
- Buddhist calendar: 8
- Burmese calendar: −1174
- Byzantine calendar: 4972–4973
- Chinese calendar: 癸亥年 (Water Pig); 2161 or 1954 — to — 甲子年 (Wood Rat); 2162 or 1955
- Coptic calendar: −820 – −819
- Discordian calendar: 630
- Ethiopian calendar: −544 – −543
- Hebrew calendar: 3224–3225
- Hindu calendars
- Vikram Samvat: −480 – −479
- Shaka Samvat: N/A
- Kali Yuga: 2564–2565
- Holocene calendar: 9464
- Iranian calendar: 1158 BP – 1157 BP
- Islamic calendar: 1194 BH – 1193 BH
- Javanese calendar: N/A
- Julian calendar: N/A
- Korean calendar: 1797
- Minguo calendar: 2448 before ROC 民前2448年
- Nanakshahi calendar: −2004
- Thai solar calendar: 6–7
- Tibetan calendar: ཆུ་མོ་ཕག་ལོ་ (female Water-Boar) −410 or −791 or −1563 — to — ཤིང་ཕོ་བྱི་བ་ལོ་ (male Wood-Rat) −409 or −790 or −1562

The year 537 BC was a year of the pre-Julian Roman calendar. In the Roman Empire, it was known as year 217 Ab urbe condita. The denomination 537 BC for this year has been used since the early medieval period, when the Anno Domini calendar era became the prevalent method in Europe for naming years.

== Events ==
=== By place ===
==== Judea ====
- The Jews lay the foundations for the Second Temple.

== Deaths ==
- Duke Jing of Qin, ruler of the Chinese state of Qin from 576 to 537 BC
