= Termera =

Ancient city in Turkey

Coordinates: 36°59′45″N 27°17′54″E

Termera (Ancient Greek: τὰ Τέρμερα), also known as Termerum or Termeron (Τέρμερον), was a maritime town of ancient Caria on the south coast of the peninsula of Halicarnassus, near Cape Termerium. Stephanus of Byzantium erroneously assigns the town to Lycia. It was a polis (city-state) and a member of the Delian League. Under the Romans this Dorian town was a free city. According to the Suda the place gave rise to the proverbial expression Τερμέρια κακά, it being used as a prison by the rulers of Caria. In Greek mythology, it was founded by Termerus, after whom it was named.

Its site is located near Asarlık, Asiatic Turkey.
