= 559 BC =

559 BC in various calendars
- Gregorian calendar: 559 BC; DLIX BC
- Ab urbe condita: 195
- Ancient Egypt era: XXVI dynasty, 106
- Pharaoh: Amasis II, 12
- Ancient Greek Olympiad (summer): 55th Olympiad, year 2
- Assyrian calendar: 4192
- Balinese saka calendar: N/A
- Bengali calendar: −1152 – −1151
- Berber calendar: 392
- Buddhist calendar: −14
- Burmese calendar: −1196
- Byzantine calendar: 4950–4951
- Chinese calendar: 辛丑年 (Metal Ox); 2139 or 1932 — to — 壬寅年 (Water Tiger); 2140 or 1933
- Coptic calendar: −842 – −841
- Discordian calendar: 608
- Ethiopian calendar: −566 – −565
- Hebrew calendar: 3202–3203
- Hindu calendars
- Vikram Samvat: −502 – −501
- Shaka Samvat: N/A
- Kali Yuga: 2542–2543
- Holocene calendar: 9442
- Iranian calendar: 1180 BP – 1179 BP
- Islamic calendar: 1216 BH – 1215 BH
- Javanese calendar: N/A
- Julian calendar: N/A
- Korean calendar: 1775
- Minguo calendar: 2470 before ROC 民前2470年
- Nanakshahi calendar: −2026
- Thai solar calendar: −16 – −15
- Tibetan calendar: ལྕགས་མོ་གླང་ལོ་ (female Iron-Ox) −432 or −813 or −1585 — to — ཆུ་ཕོ་སྟག་ལོ་ (male Water-Tiger) −431 or −812 or −1584

The year 559 BC was a year of the pre-Julian Roman calendar. In the Roman Empire, it was known as year 195 Ab urbe condita. The denomination 559 BC for this year has been used since the early medieval period, when the Anno Domini calendar era became the prevalent method in Europe for naming years.

== Events ==
- Cyrus the Great succeeds his father Cambyses I of Anshan.
- In the year of his accession (560–559 BC), the Babylonian king Neriglissar commands the declaration of an intercalendary month, so that his first year of kingship begins on Nisan 1 of 559 BC.

== Births ==
- Amitis Shahbanu, Achaemenid queen

== Deaths ==
- Cambyses I, father of Cyrus the Great and king of Anshan
