= 507 BC =

507 BC in various calendars
- Gregorian calendar: 507 BC; DVII BC
- Ab urbe condita: 247
- Ancient Egypt era: XXVII dynasty, 19
- Pharaoh: Darius I of Persia, 15
- Ancient Greek Olympiad (summer): 68th Olympiad, year 2
- Assyrian calendar: 4244
- Balinese saka calendar: N/A
- Bengali calendar: −1100 – −1099
- Berber calendar: 444
- Buddhist calendar: 38
- Burmese calendar: −1144
- Byzantine calendar: 5002–5003
- Chinese calendar: 癸巳年 (Water Snake); 2191 or 1984 — to — 甲午年 (Wood Horse); 2192 or 1985
- Coptic calendar: −790 – −789
- Discordian calendar: 660
- Ethiopian calendar: −514 – −513
- Hebrew calendar: 3254–3255
- Hindu calendars
- Vikram Samvat: −450 – −449
- Shaka Samvat: N/A
- Kali Yuga: 2594–2595
- Holocene calendar: 9494
- Iranian calendar: 1128 BP – 1127 BP
- Islamic calendar: 1163 BH – 1162 BH
- Javanese calendar: N/A
- Julian calendar: N/A
- Korean calendar: 1827
- Minguo calendar: 2418 before ROC 民前2418年
- Nanakshahi calendar: −1974
- Thai solar calendar: 36–37
- Tibetan calendar: ཆུ་མོ་སྦྲུལ་ལོ་ (female Water-Snake) −380 or −761 or −1533 — to — ཤིང་ཕོ་རྟ་ལོ་ (male Wood-Horse) −379 or −760 or −1532

The year 507 BC was a year of the pre-Julian Roman calendar. In the Roman Empire it was known as the Year of the Consulship of Poplicola and Pulvillus (or, less frequently, year 247 Ab urbe condita). The denomination 507 BC for this year has been used since the early medieval period, when the Anno Domini calendar era became the prevalent method in Europe for naming years.

== Events ==
=== By place ===
==== Greece ====
- Cleisthenes takes power in the city-state of Athens and institutes reforms that lead historians to consider him the father of democracy.
- Athenians send an embassy to the Achaemenid satrap of Asia Minor - in the capital city of Sardis - for help in defending against Spartan threats, but refuse to accept Persian terms, which demanded the return of Hippias' tyranny.

== Births ==
- Lu Ban, Chinese inventor and philosopher (d. 440 BC)

== Deaths ==
- Sudharmaswami, Indian religious leader (b. 607 BC)
