= 514 BC =

514 BC in various calendars
- Gregorian calendar: 514 BC; DXIV BC
- Ab urbe condita: 240
- Ancient Egypt era: XXVII dynasty, 12
- Pharaoh: Darius I of Persia, 8
- Ancient Greek Olympiad (summer): 66th Olympiad, year 3
- Assyrian calendar: 4237
- Balinese saka calendar: N/A
- Bengali calendar: −1107 – −1106
- Berber calendar: 437
- Buddhist calendar: 31
- Burmese calendar: −1151
- Byzantine calendar: 4995–4996
- Chinese calendar: 丙戌年 (Fire Dog); 2184 or 1977 — to — 丁亥年 (Fire Pig); 2185 or 1978
- Coptic calendar: −797 – −796
- Discordian calendar: 653
- Ethiopian calendar: −521 – −520
- Hebrew calendar: 3247–3248
- Hindu calendars
- Vikram Samvat: −457 – −456
- Shaka Samvat: N/A
- Kali Yuga: 2587–2588
- Holocene calendar: 9487
- Iranian calendar: 1135 BP – 1134 BP
- Islamic calendar: 1170 BH – 1169 BH
- Javanese calendar: N/A
- Julian calendar: N/A
- Korean calendar: 1820
- Minguo calendar: 2425 before ROC 民前2425年
- Nanakshahi calendar: −1981
- Thai solar calendar: 29–30
- Tibetan calendar: མེ་ཕོ་ཁྱི་ལོ་ (male Fire-Dog) −387 or −768 or −1540 — to — མེ་མོ་ཕག་ལོ་ (female Fire-Boar) −386 or −767 or −1539

The year 514 BC was a year of the pre-Julian Roman calendar. In the Roman Empire, it was known as year 240 Ab urbe condita . The denomination 514 BC for this year has been used since the early medieval period, when the Anno Domini calendar era became the prevalent method in Europe for naming years.

== Events ==
=== By place ===
==== Asia ====
- Suzhou City in China was founded by Wu Zixu
- King Helu of Wu ascends to the throne of Wu in Zhou Dynasty China. He establishes Suzhou as his capital.
- Darius I leads his Persian army across the Bosphorus and campaigns unsuccessfully against the Scythians on the Danube.

== Deaths ==
- Harmodius and Aristogeiton, two men from ancient Athens who became known as the tyrannicides (τυραννοκτόνοι) after killing the Peisistratid ruler Hipparchus, and were the preeminent symbol of democracy to ancient Athenians.
- Hipparchus, a member of the ruling class of Athens. He was one of the sons of Peisistratus.
