= 558 BC =

558 BC in various calendars
- Gregorian calendar: 558 BC; DLVIII BC
- Ab urbe condita: 196
- Ancient Egypt era: XXVI dynasty, 107
- Pharaoh: Amasis II, 13
- Ancient Greek Olympiad (summer): 55th Olympiad, year 3
- Assyrian calendar: 4193
- Balinese saka calendar: N/A
- Bengali calendar: −1151 – −1150
- Berber calendar: 393
- Buddhist calendar: −13
- Burmese calendar: −1195
- Byzantine calendar: 4951–4952
- Chinese calendar: 壬寅年 (Water Tiger); 2140 or 1933 — to — 癸卯年 (Water Rabbit); 2141 or 1934
- Coptic calendar: −841 – −840
- Discordian calendar: 609
- Ethiopian calendar: −565 – −564
- Hebrew calendar: 3203–3204
- Hindu calendars
- Vikram Samvat: −501 – −500
- Shaka Samvat: N/A
- Kali Yuga: 2543–2544
- Holocene calendar: 9443
- Iranian calendar: 1179 BP – 1178 BP
- Islamic calendar: 1215 BH – 1214 BH
- Javanese calendar: N/A
- Julian calendar: N/A
- Korean calendar: 1776
- Minguo calendar: 2469 before ROC 民前2469年
- Nanakshahi calendar: −2025
- Thai solar calendar: −15 – −14
- Tibetan calendar: ཆུ་ཕོ་སྟག་ལོ་ (male Water-Tiger) −431 or −812 or −1584 — to — ཆུ་མོ་ཡོས་ལོ་ (female Water-Hare) −430 or −811 or −1583

The year 558 BC was a year of the pre-Julian Roman calendar. In the Roman Empire, it was known as year 196 Ab urbe condita. The denomination 558 BC for this year has been used since the early medieval period, when the Anno Domini calendar era became the prevalent method in Europe for naming years.

== Events ==
- The Chinese state of Jin defeats its rival state of Qin in battle.

== Deaths ==
- Solon, Athenian statesman and poet
- Duke Dao of Jin, ruler of the State of Jin
