= 538 BC =

538 BC in various calendars
Gregorian calendar	538 BC; DXXXVIII BC
Ab urbe condita	216
Ancient Egypt era	XXVI dynasty, 127
Pharaoh	Amasis II, 33
Ancient Greek Olympiad (summer)	60th Olympiad, year 3
Assyrian calendar	4213
Balinese saka calendar	N/A
Bengali calendar	−1131 – −1130
Berber calendar	413
Buddhist calendar	7
Burmese calendar	−1175
Byzantine calendar	4971–4972
Chinese calendar	壬戌年 (Water Dog); 2160 or 1953 — to — 癸亥年 (Water Pig); 2161 or 1954
Coptic calendar	−821 – −820
Discordian calendar	629
Ethiopian calendar	−545 – −544
Hebrew calendar	3223–3224
- Hindu calendars
Vikram Samvat	−481 – −480
Shaka Samvat	N/A
Kali Yuga	2563–2564
Holocene calendar	9463
Iranian calendar	1159 BP – 1158 BP
Islamic calendar	1195 BH – 1194 BH
Javanese calendar	N/A
Julian calendar	N/A
Korean calendar	1796
Minguo calendar	2449 before ROC 民前2449年
Nanakshahi calendar	−2005
Thai solar calendar	5–6
Tibetan calendar	阳水狗年 (male Water-Dog) −411 or −792 or −1564 — to — 阴水猪年 (female Water-Pig) −410 or −791 or −1563

The year 538 BC was a year of the pre-Julian Roman calendar. In the Roman Empire, it was known as year 216 Ab urbe condita. The denomination 538 BC for this year has been used since the early medieval period, when the Anno Domini calendar era became the prevalent method in Europe for naming years.

== Events ==
=== By place ===
==== Near East ====
- The Babylonian captivity of the Jews in Babylon ends when Cyrus the Great, king of Persia, allows them to return to Jerusalem under the leadership of Zerubbabel and Joshua the High Priest; possible start of construction of the Second Temple.

== Deaths ==
- Death of Cassandane, wife of Cyrus the Great
