= 452 BC =

452 BC in various calendars
- Gregorian calendar: 452 BC; CDLII BC
- Ab urbe condita: 302
- Ancient Egypt era: XXVII dynasty, 74
- Pharaoh: Artaxerxes I of Persia, 14
- Ancient Greek Olympiad (summer): 82nd Olympiad (victor)¹
- Assyrian calendar: 4299
- Balinese saka calendar: N/A
- Bengali calendar: −1045 – −1044
- Berber calendar: 499
- Buddhist calendar: 93
- Burmese calendar: −1089
- Byzantine calendar: 5057–5058
- Chinese calendar: 戊子年 (Earth Rat); 2246 or 2039 — to — 己丑年 (Earth Ox); 2247 or 2040
- Coptic calendar: −735 – −734
- Discordian calendar: 715
- Ethiopian calendar: −459 – −458
- Hebrew calendar: 3309–3310
- Hindu calendars
- Vikram Samvat: −395 – −394
- Shaka Samvat: N/A
- Kali Yuga: 2649–2650
- Holocene calendar: 9549
- Iranian calendar: 1073 BP – 1072 BP
- Islamic calendar: 1106 BH – 1105 BH
- Javanese calendar: N/A
- Julian calendar: N/A
- Korean calendar: 1882
- Minguo calendar: 2363 before ROC 民前2363年
- Nanakshahi calendar: −1919
- Thai solar calendar: 91–92
- Tibetan calendar: ས་ཕོ་བྱི་བ་ལོ་ (male Earth-Rat) −325 or −706 or −1478 — to — ས་མོ་གླང་ལོ་ (female Earth-Ox) −324 or −705 or −1477

Year 452 BC was a year of the pre-Julian Roman calendar. At the time, it was known as the Year of the Consulship of Lanatus and Vaticanus (or, less frequently, year 302 Ab urbe condita). The denomination 452 BC for this year has been used since the early medieval period, when the Anno Domini calendar era became the prevalent method in Europe for naming years.

== Events ==
- An outbreak of plague spreads throughout Italy.

== Deaths ==
- Sextus Quinctilius, consul of the Roman Republic, 453–452 BC, plague.
