= 521 BC =

521 BC in various calendars
- Gregorian calendar: 521 BC; DXXI BC
- Ab urbe condita: 233
- Ancient Egypt era: XXVII dynasty, 5
- Pharaoh: Darius I of Persia, 1
- Ancient Greek Olympiad (summer): 64th Olympiad, year 4
- Assyrian calendar: 4230
- Balinese saka calendar: N/A
- Bengali calendar: −1114 – −1113
- Berber calendar: 430
- Buddhist calendar: 24
- Burmese calendar: −1158
- Byzantine calendar: 4988–4989
- Chinese calendar: 己卯年 (Earth Rabbit); 2177 or 1970 — to — 庚辰年 (Metal Dragon); 2178 or 1971
- Coptic calendar: −804 – −803
- Discordian calendar: 646
- Ethiopian calendar: −528 – −527
- Hebrew calendar: 3240–3241
- Hindu calendars
- Vikram Samvat: −464 – −463
- Shaka Samvat: N/A
- Kali Yuga: 2580–2581
- Holocene calendar: 9480
- Iranian calendar: 1142 BP – 1141 BP
- Islamic calendar: 1177 BH – 1176 BH
- Javanese calendar: N/A
- Julian calendar: N/A
- Korean calendar: 1813
- Minguo calendar: 2432 before ROC 民前2432年
- Nanakshahi calendar: −1988
- Thai solar calendar: 22–23
- Tibetan calendar: ས་མོ་ཡོས་ལོ་ (female Earth-Hare) −394 or −775 or −1547 — to — ལྕགས་ཕོ་འབྲུག་ལོ་ (male Iron-Dragon) −393 or −774 or −1546

The year 521 BC was a year of the pre-Julian Roman calendar. In the Roman Empire, it was known as year 233 Ab urbe condita. The denomination 521 BC for this year has been used since the early medieval period, when the Anno Domini calendar era became the prevalent method in Europe for naming years.

== Births ==
- Fu Buqi, disciple of Confucius.
- Gao Chai, disciple of Confucius.
