= 504 BC =

504 BC in various calendars
- Gregorian calendar: 504 BC; DIV BC
- Ab urbe condita: 250
- Ancient Egypt era: XXVII dynasty, 22
- Pharaoh: Darius I of Persia, 18
- Ancient Greek Olympiad (summer): 69th Olympiad (victor)¹
- Assyrian calendar: 4247
- Balinese saka calendar: N/A
- Bengali calendar: −1097 – −1096
- Berber calendar: 447
- Buddhist calendar: 41
- Burmese calendar: −1141
- Byzantine calendar: 5005–5006
- Chinese calendar: 丙申年 (Fire Monkey); 2194 or 1987 — to — 丁酉年 (Fire Rooster); 2195 or 1988
- Coptic calendar: −787 – −786
- Discordian calendar: 663
- Ethiopian calendar: −511 – −510
- Hebrew calendar: 3257–3258
- Hindu calendars
- Vikram Samvat: −447 – −446
- Shaka Samvat: N/A
- Kali Yuga: 2597–2598
- Holocene calendar: 9497
- Iranian calendar: 1125 BP – 1124 BP
- Islamic calendar: 1160 BH – 1159 BH
- Javanese calendar: N/A
- Julian calendar: N/A
- Korean calendar: 1830
- Minguo calendar: 2415 before ROC 民前2415年
- Nanakshahi calendar: −1971
- Thai solar calendar: 39–40
- Tibetan calendar: མེ་ཕོ་སྤྲེ་ལོ་ (male Fire-Monkey) −377 or −758 or −1530 — to — མེ་མོ་བྱ་ལོ་ (female Fire-Bird) −376 or −757 or −1529

The year 504 BC was a year of the pre-Julian Roman calendar. In the Roman Empire it was known as the Year of the Consulship of Poplicola and Tricipitinus (or, less frequently, year 250 Ab urbe condita). The denomination 504 BC for this year has been used since the early medieval period, when the Anno Domini calendar era became the prevalent method in Europe for naming years.

== Events ==
=== By place ===
==== Roman Republic ====
- A war between Rome and the Sabines ends, having begun in 505 BC.
