= 551 BC =

551 BC in various calendars
- Gregorian calendar: 551 BC; DLI BC
- Ab urbe condita: 203
- Ancient Egypt era: XXVI dynasty, 114
- Pharaoh: Amasis II, 20
- Ancient Greek Olympiad (summer): 57th Olympiad, year 2
- Assyrian calendar: 4200
- Balinese saka calendar: N/A
- Bengali calendar: −1144 – −1143
- Berber calendar: 400
- Buddhist calendar: −6
- Burmese calendar: −1188
- Byzantine calendar: 4958–4959
- Chinese calendar: 己酉年 (Earth Rooster); 2147 or 1940 — to — 庚戌年 (Metal Dog); 2148 or 1941
- Coptic calendar: −834 – −833
- Discordian calendar: 616
- Ethiopian calendar: −558 – −557
- Hebrew calendar: 3210–3211
- Hindu calendars
- Vikram Samvat: −494 – −493
- Shaka Samvat: N/A
- Kali Yuga: 2550–2551
- Holocene calendar: 9450
- Iranian calendar: 1172 BP – 1171 BP
- Islamic calendar: 1208 BH – 1207 BH
- Javanese calendar: N/A
- Julian calendar: N/A
- Korean calendar: 1783
- Minguo calendar: 2462 before ROC 民前2462年
- Nanakshahi calendar: −2018
- Thai solar calendar: −8 – −7
- Tibetan calendar: ས་མོ་བྱ་ལོ་ (female Earth-Bird) −424 or −805 or −1577 — to — ལྕགས་ཕོ་ཁྱི་ལོ་ (male Iron-Dog) −423 or −804 or −1576

The year 551 BC was a year of the pre-Julian Roman calendar. In the Roman Empire, it was known as year 203 Ab urbe condita. The denomination 551 BC for this year has been used since the early medieval period, when the Anno Domini calendar era became the prevalent method in Europe for naming years.

== Births ==
- September 28 – Confucius, Chinese philosopher (d. 479 BC)

== Deaths ==
- Zoroaster, Persian religious prophet (approximate date)
