= 513 BC =

513 BC in various calendars
- Gregorian calendar: 513 BC; DXIII BC
- Ab urbe condita: 241
- Ancient Egypt era: XXVII dynasty, 13
- Pharaoh: Darius I of Persia, 9
- Ancient Greek Olympiad (summer): 66th Olympiad, year 4
- Assyrian calendar: 4238
- Balinese saka calendar: N/A
- Bengali calendar: −1106 – −1105
- Berber calendar: 438
- Buddhist calendar: 32
- Burmese calendar: −1150
- Byzantine calendar: 4996–4997
- Chinese calendar: 丁亥年 (Fire Pig); 2185 or 1978 — to — 戊子年 (Earth Rat); 2186 or 1979
- Coptic calendar: −796 – −795
- Discordian calendar: 654
- Ethiopian calendar: −520 – −519
- Hebrew calendar: 3248–3249
- Hindu calendars
- Vikram Samvat: −456 – −455
- Shaka Samvat: N/A
- Kali Yuga: 2588–2589
- Holocene calendar: 9488
- Iranian calendar: 1134 BP – 1133 BP
- Islamic calendar: 1169 BH – 1168 BH
- Javanese calendar: N/A
- Julian calendar: N/A
- Korean calendar: 1821
- Minguo calendar: 2424 before ROC 民前2424年
- Nanakshahi calendar: −1980
- Thai solar calendar: 30–31
- Tibetan calendar: མེ་མོ་ཕག་ལོ་ (female Fire-Boar) −386 or −767 or −1539 — to — ས་ཕོ་བྱི་བ་ལོ་ (male Earth-Rat) −385 or −766 or −1538

The year 513 BC was a year of the pre-Julian Roman calendar. In the Roman Empire, it was known as year 241 Ab urbe condita. The denomination 513 BC for this year has been used since the early medieval period, when the Anno Domini calendar era became the prevalent method in Europe for naming years.

== Events ==
=== By place ===
==== Asia ====
- Darius the Great subdues the Getae and east Thrace in his war against the Scythians. To accomplish this, he builds a massive pontoon bridge across the Bosphorus Strait.
- Western India, which includes the Indus Valley, becomes the Persian satrapy Hindush.

==== Europe ====
- Amyntas I of Macedon submits to Darius and offers women as concubines to a Persian embassy. His son, Alexander I, objects to this and tricks them by substituting the women with clean-shaven men (or 512 BC).
- European Scythian campaign of Darius I
