= 510 BC =

510 BC in various calendars
- Gregorian calendar: 510 BC; DX BC
- Ab urbe condita: 244
- Ancient Egypt era: XXVII dynasty, 16
- Pharaoh: Darius I of Persia, 12
- Ancient Greek Olympiad (summer): 67th Olympiad, year 3
- Assyrian calendar: 4241
- Balinese saka calendar: N/A
- Bengali calendar: −1103 – −1102
- Berber calendar: 441
- Buddhist calendar: 35
- Burmese calendar: −1147
- Byzantine calendar: 4999–5000
- Chinese calendar: 庚寅年 (Metal Tiger); 2188 or 1981 — to — 辛卯年 (Metal Rabbit); 2189 or 1982
- Coptic calendar: −793 – −792
- Discordian calendar: 657
- Ethiopian calendar: −517 – −516
- Hebrew calendar: 3251–3252
- Hindu calendars
- Vikram Samvat: −453 – −452
- Shaka Samvat: N/A
- Kali Yuga: 2591–2592
- Holocene calendar: 9491
- Iranian calendar: 1131 BP – 1130 BP
- Islamic calendar: 1166 BH – 1165 BH
- Javanese calendar: N/A
- Julian calendar: N/A
- Korean calendar: 1824
- Minguo calendar: 2421 before ROC 民前2421年
- Nanakshahi calendar: −1977
- Thai solar calendar: 33–34
- Tibetan calendar: ལྕགས་ཕོ་སྟག་ལོ་ (male Iron-Tiger) −383 or −764 or −1536 — to — ལྕགས་མོ་ཡོས་ལོ་ (female Iron-Hare) −382 or −763 or −1535

The year 510 BC was a year of the pre-Julian Roman calendar. In the Roman Empire, it was known as year 244 Ab urbe condita. The denomination 510 BC for this year has been used since the early medieval period, when the Anno Domini calendar era became the prevalent method in Europe for naming years.

== Events ==
=== By place ===
==== Europe ====
- Hippias, tyrant of Athens, is expelled by his people with the assistance of Cleomenes, King of Sparta
- The reign of Lucius Tarquinius Superbus, last king of the traditional seven Kings of Rome, concludes. The Kingdom of Rome falls and is replaced by the Roman Republic. (or 509 BC)
- Ariston is succeeded as King of Sparta by Demaratus.
- Stelae begin to be banned in Athenian cemeteries (approximate date; ends c. 430 BC).
- Scylax of Caryanda becomes the first mariner to have passed the Indian Ocean.

== Births ==
- Cimon, Athenian statesman and strategos (d. 450 BC)

== Deaths ==
- Aryandes, Persian satrap of Egypt (executed by the Persian king Darius I)
- Annei, emperor of Japan (b. 577 BC)
