= 536 BC =

536 BC in various calendars
- Gregorian calendar: 536 BC; DXXXVI BC
- Ab urbe condita: 218
- Ancient Egypt era: XXVI dynasty, 129
- Pharaoh: Amasis II, 35
- Ancient Greek Olympiad (summer): 61st Olympiad (victor)¹
- Assyrian calendar: 4215
- Balinese saka calendar: N/A
- Bengali calendar: −1129 – −1128
- Berber calendar: 415
- Buddhist calendar: 9
- Burmese calendar: −1173
- Byzantine calendar: 4973–4974
- Chinese calendar: 甲子年 (Wood Rat); 2162 or 1955 — to — 乙丑年 (Wood Ox); 2163 or 1956
- Coptic calendar: −819 – −818
- Discordian calendar: 631
- Ethiopian calendar: −543 – −542
- Hebrew calendar: 3225–3226
- Hindu calendars
- Vikram Samvat: −479 – −478
- Shaka Samvat: N/A
- Kali Yuga: 2565–2566
- Holocene calendar: 9465
- Iranian calendar: 1157 BP – 1156 BP
- Islamic calendar: 1193 BH – 1192 BH
- Javanese calendar: N/A
- Julian calendar: N/A
- Korean calendar: 1798
- Minguo calendar: 2447 before ROC 民前2447年
- Nanakshahi calendar: −2003
- Thai solar calendar: 7–8
- Tibetan calendar: ཤིང་ཕོ་བྱི་བ་ལོ་ (male Wood-Rat) −409 or −790 or −1562 — to — ཤིང་མོ་གླང་ལོ་ (female Wood-Ox) −408 or −789 or −1561

The year 536 BC was a year of the pre-Julian Roman calendar. In the Roman Empire, it was known as year 218 Ab urbe condita. The denomination 536 BC for this year has been used since the early medieval period, when the Anno Domini calendar era became the prevalent method in Europe for naming years.

== Events ==
- Phrynaeus is appointed archon of Athens.

== Births ==
- Min Sun, disciple of Confucius
