= 516 BC =

516 BC in various calendars
- Gregorian calendar: 516 BC; DXVI BC
- Ab urbe condita: 238
- Ancient Egypt era: XXVII dynasty, 10
- Pharaoh: Darius I of Persia, 6
- Ancient Greek Olympiad (summer): 66th Olympiad (victor)¹
- Assyrian calendar: 4235
- Balinese saka calendar: N/A
- Bengali calendar: −1109 – −1108
- Berber calendar: 435
- Buddhist calendar: 29
- Burmese calendar: −1153
- Byzantine calendar: 4993–4994
- Chinese calendar: 甲申年 (Wood Monkey); 2182 or 1975 — to — 乙酉年 (Wood Rooster); 2183 or 1976
- Coptic calendar: −799 – −798
- Discordian calendar: 651
- Ethiopian calendar: −523 – −522
- Hebrew calendar: 3245–3246
- Hindu calendars
- Vikram Samvat: −459 – −458
- Shaka Samvat: N/A
- Kali Yuga: 2585–2586
- Holocene calendar: 9485
- Iranian calendar: 1137 BP – 1136 BP
- Islamic calendar: 1172 BH – 1171 BH
- Javanese calendar: N/A
- Julian calendar: N/A
- Korean calendar: 1818
- Minguo calendar: 2427 before ROC 民前2427年
- Nanakshahi calendar: −1983
- Thai solar calendar: 27–28
- Tibetan calendar: ཤིང་ཕོ་སྤྲེ་ལོ་ (male Wood-Monkey) −389 or −770 or −1542 — to — ཤིང་མོ་བྱ་ལོ་ (female Wood-Bird) −388 or −769 or −1541

The year 516 BC was a year of the pre-Julian Roman calendar. In the Roman Empire, it was known as year 238 Ab urbe condita . The denomination 516 BC for this year has been used since the early medieval period, when the Anno Domini calendar era became the prevalent method in Europe for naming years.

== Events ==
=== By place ===
==== Greece ====
- Cleomenes received an embassy from Maeandrius of Samos asking him for help to expel the tyrant Syloson, a puppet of the Persian Empire, which was at the time subjugating the city-states of the eastern Aegean sea.

==== India ====
- The Persian king Darius I occupies Punjab, as part of his Achaemenid conquest of the Indus Valley.

== Deaths ==
- King Ping of Chu - King of the State of Chu from 528 to 516 BC
