= 556 BC =

556 BC in various calendars
- Gregorian calendar: 556 BC; DLVI BC
- Ab urbe condita: 198
- Ancient Egypt era: XXVI dynasty, 109
- Pharaoh: Amasis II, 15
- Ancient Greek Olympiad (summer): 56th Olympiad (victor)¹
- Assyrian calendar: 4195
- Balinese saka calendar: N/A
- Bengali calendar: −1149 – −1148
- Berber calendar: 395
- Buddhist calendar: −11
- Burmese calendar: −1193
- Byzantine calendar: 4953–4954
- Chinese calendar: 甲辰年 (Wood Dragon); 2142 or 1935 — to — 乙巳年 (Wood Snake); 2143 or 1936
- Coptic calendar: −839 – −838
- Discordian calendar: 611
- Ethiopian calendar: −563 – −562
- Hebrew calendar: 3205–3206
- Hindu calendars
- Vikram Samvat: −499 – −498
- Shaka Samvat: N/A
- Kali Yuga: 2545–2546
- Holocene calendar: 9445
- Iranian calendar: 1177 BP – 1176 BP
- Islamic calendar: 1213 BH – 1212 BH
- Javanese calendar: N/A
- Julian calendar: N/A
- Korean calendar: 1778
- Minguo calendar: 2467 before ROC 民前2467年
- Nanakshahi calendar: −2023
- Thai solar calendar: −13 – −12
- Tibetan calendar: ཤིང་ཕོ་འབྲུག་ལོ་ (male Wood-Dragon) −429 or −810 or −1582 — to — ཤིང་མོ་སྦྲུལ་ལོ་ (female Wood-Snake) −428 or −809 or −1581

The year 556 BC was a year of the pre-Julian Roman calendar. In the Roman Empire, it was known as year 198 Ab urbe condita. The denomination 556 BC for this year has been used since the early medieval period, when the Anno Domini calendar era became the prevalent method in Europe for naming years.

== Events ==
- Labashi-Marduk succeeds Neriglissar as king of Babylon.
- Pisistratus is expelled to Euboea from Athens, and makes his fortune from Thrace's mines.
- Nabonidus succeeds Labashi-Marduk as king of Babylon.

== Births ==
- Simonides of Ceos, approximate date

== Deaths ==
- Labashi-Marduk, king of Babylon
- Neriglissar, king of Babylon
