= 560 BC =

560 BC in various calendars
- Gregorian calendar: 560 BC; DLX BC
- Ab urbe condita: 194
- Ancient Egypt era: XXVI dynasty, 105
- Pharaoh: Amasis II, 11
- Ancient Greek Olympiad (summer): 55th Olympiad (victor)¹
- Assyrian calendar: 4191
- Balinese saka calendar: N/A
- Bengali calendar: −1153 – −1152
- Berber calendar: 391
- Buddhist calendar: −15
- Burmese calendar: −1197
- Byzantine calendar: 4949–4950
- Chinese calendar: 庚子年 (Metal Rat); 2138 or 1931 — to — 辛丑年 (Metal Ox); 2139 or 1932
- Coptic calendar: −843 – −842
- Discordian calendar: 607
- Ethiopian calendar: −567 – −566
- Hebrew calendar: 3201–3202
- Hindu calendars
- Vikram Samvat: −503 – −502
- Shaka Samvat: N/A
- Kali Yuga: 2541–2542
- Holocene calendar: 9441
- Iranian calendar: 1181 BP – 1180 BP
- Islamic calendar: 1217 BH – 1216 BH
- Javanese calendar: N/A
- Julian calendar: N/A
- Korean calendar: 1774
- Minguo calendar: 2471 before ROC 民前2471年
- Nanakshahi calendar: −2027
- Thai solar calendar: −17 – −16
- Tibetan calendar: ལྕགས་ཕོ་བྱི་བ་ལོ་ (male Iron-Rat) −433 or −814 or −1586 — to — ལྕགས་མོ་གླང་ལོ་ (female Iron-Ox) −432 or −813 or −1585

The year 560 BC was a year of the pre-Julian Roman calendar. In the Roman Empire, it was known as year 194 Ab urbe condita. The denomination 560 BC for this year has been used since the early medieval period, when the Anno Domini calendar era became the prevalent method in Europe for naming years.

== Events ==
- Peisistratus seizes the Acropolis in Athens, becoming the city's tyrant for the first time.
- Calf bearer (Moscophoros), (Note: Date of creation varies) from the Acropolis, Athens is made. It is now displayed at the Acropolis Museum, Athens (approximate date).
- Berlin Kore, begun in 570 BC, is finished. It is now displayed in Germany.

== Births ==
- Phocylides, Greek gnomic poet from Miletus
- Xenophanes, Greek poet and philosopher born in Colophon (approximate year)

== Deaths ==
- Amel-Marduk, king of Babylon
- Battus II of Cyrene, Greek king of Cyrene and Cyrenaica
- King Gong of Chu, Chinese king of Chu
- Leon of Sparta, king of Sparta
- Solon Greek poet and statesman (approximate year)
