= 508 (disambiguation) =

508 may refer to:

- 508 (number), the number
- 508, the year 508 (DVIII) of the Julian calendar
- 508 BC
- 508th (disambiguation)
- Section 508 Amendment to the Rehabilitation Act of 1973
- Area code 508, an area code in southeastern Massachusetts

== Automobiles ==
- Fiat 508, a compact car
  - Fiat 508C, a small family car succeeding the Fiat 508
- Peugeot 508, a family car

== See also ==
- 508th (disambiguation)
