= 508th Regiment =

508th Regiment may refer to:

- 508th Fighter Aviation Regiment, Soviet Union
- 508th Infantry Regiment, United States

== See also ==
- 508th (disambiguation)
