= Peugeot 508 =

Large family car produced by Peugeot (2010–2025)

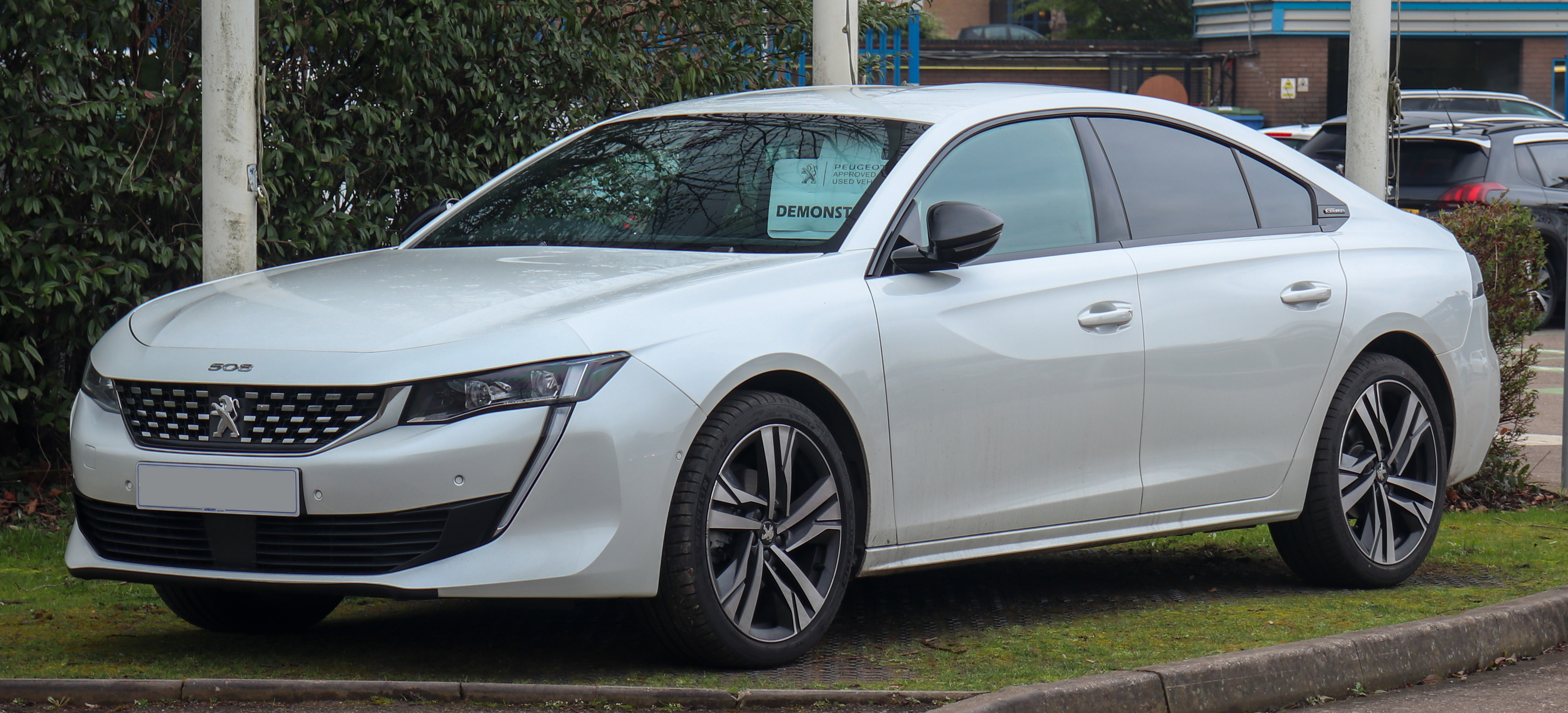
- Peugeot 508 (second generation)

Overview
- Manufacturer: Peugeot
- Production: 2010–2025; 2011–present (China)

Body and chassis
- Class: Large family car (D)
- Body style: 4-door saloon 5-door estate
- Layout: Front-engine, front-wheel-drive or all-wheel-drive
- Related: Peugeot 5008

Chronology
- Predecessor: Peugeot 407; Peugeot 607

The Peugeot 508 is a mid-size family car produced by the French automaker Peugeot since 2010, and followed by the 508 SW, an estate version, in 2011. Since 2012, the 508 has been the flagship model by Peugeot, slotted above the 208 and 308 in size.

The 508 serves as the successor to both the 407 and 607 model lines, replacing both vehicles under a single nameplate for which no direct replacement was scheduled. It shares its platform and most engine options with the second generation Citroën C5: the two cars are produced alongside one another at the company's Rennes Plant, and in Wuhan, China, for sales inside China.

== First generation (W23; 2011) ==
First generation
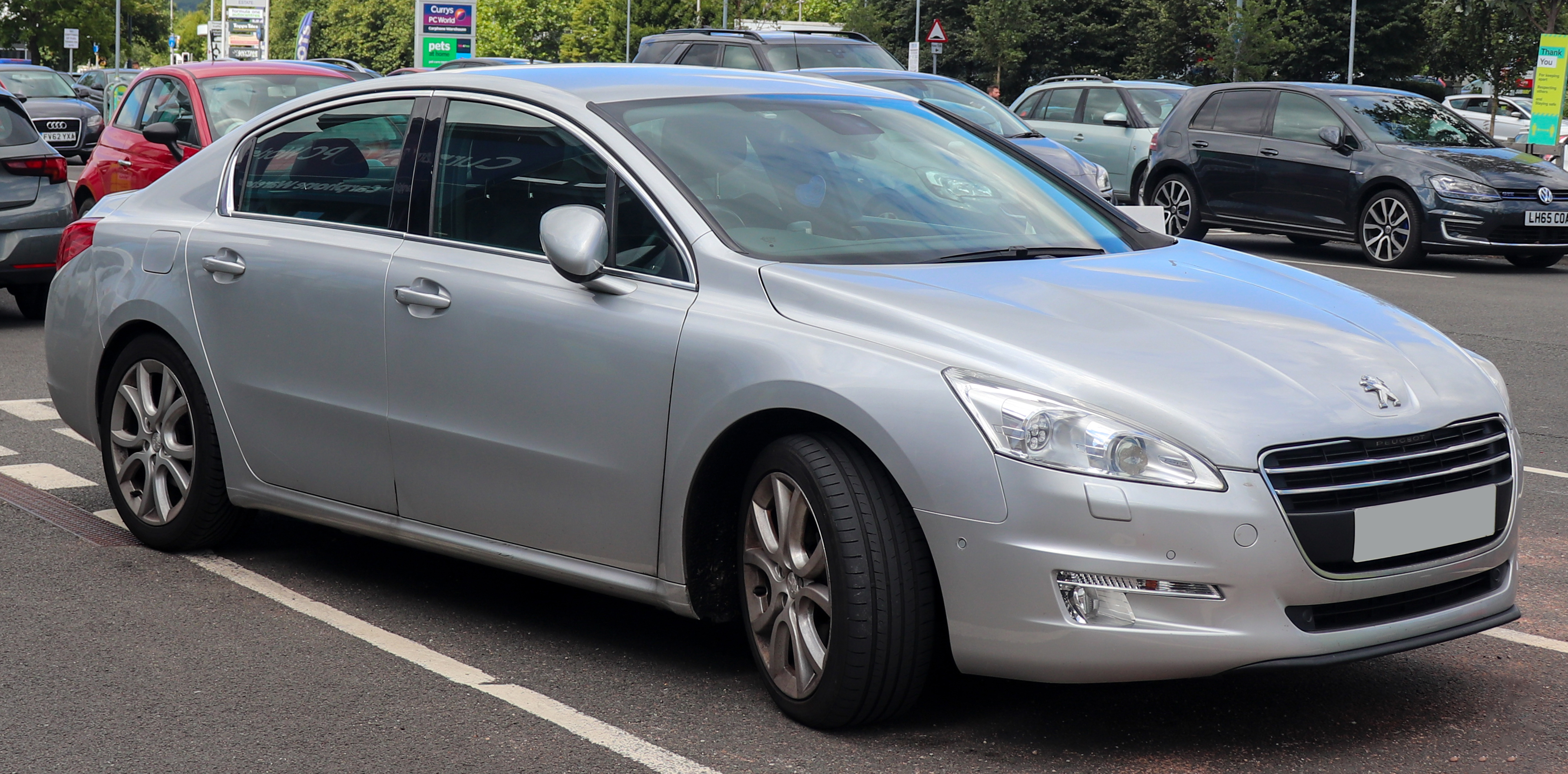

Overview
- Model code: W23
- Production: 2011–2018; 2012–2019 (Malaysia)
- Assembly: France: Rennes (Rennes Plant); China: Wuhan (DPCA); Malaysia: Gurun (NAM); Nigeria: Kaduna; Kazakhstan: Kostanay (Saryarka AvtoProm); Kenya: Thika (KVM)

Body and chassis
- Platform: PSA PF3 platform
- Related: Citroën C5

Powertrain
- Engine: Petrol: 1.6 L BMW/PSA EP6 I4 VTi; 1.6 L BMW/PSA EP6DT Turbo I4 THP; 1.8 L EW7 I4; 1.8 L Turbo I4 THP; 2.0 L EW10 I4; 2.3 L EW12A I4; Diesel: 1.6 L Ford/PSA DV6 I4 HDi (common rail turbo); 1.6 L Ford/PSA DV6 I4 e-HDi; 1.6 L Ford/PSA DV6 I4 BlueHDi; 2.0 L DW10 I4 HDi; 2.0 L DW10 I4 BlueHDi; 2.2 L DW12 I4 HDi; Diesel hybrid: 2.0 L DW10 I4 HDi
- Electric motor: 37 Hp Bosch permanent magnet synchronous motor
- Transmission: 5-speed manual 6-speed manual 6-speed automated manual BMP6(Auto6r); 6-speed automatic AM6 (2010–2014); 6-speed automatic EAT6 (2015–2018)
- Hybrid drivetrain: FHEV (Full Hybrid Electric Vehicle)
- Battery: Ni-MH

Dimensions
- Wheelbase: 2,817 mm (110.9 in)
- Length: 4,792 mm (188.7 in); 4,828 mm (190.1 in) (RXH)
- Width: 1,853 mm (73.0 in); 1,864 mm (73.4 in) (RXH)
- Height: 1,456 mm (57.3 in); 1,525 mm (60.0 in) (RXH)
- Curb weight: 1,390–1,770 kg (3,064–3,902 lb)

=== Overview ===
The 508 saloon is 4.7912 m (188.63 in) long, while the 508 SW (estate) is 4.81 m (189 in) long. Compared to the Peugeot 407, the 508 has a shorter front overhang and a longer rear passenger compartment.

After a few initial leaked spyshots, the first definitive details and images leaked to the web on 12 July 2010. Peugeot released additional information on 6 September 2010. The 508 was officially launched at the 2010 Paris Motor Show. PSA Peugeot Citroën build the 508 in China in partnership with Dongfeng Motor. It was launched there on 10 August 2011.

It was reported in 2011 that Peugeot expected China to be the largest market for the car, at almost twice that of France. If predictions were correct, it would be the first time that the company sold more units in any country other than France for any model that is available in Europe.

The Peugeot 508 was given a facelift in 2015, with the introduction of a vertical grille with the Peugeot lion in the centre. The front of the car was redesigned and full LED headlights became available. New engines were also launched, and front-wheel drive introduced for the RXH. The Peugeot 508 has received several international awards including Car of the Year 2011 in Spain (awarded 2012), Next Green Car, and Best Large Family Car 2011. Citations commented on the car "being spacious and well equipped" and that it "represented excellent build quality and has the best fuel economy in its class" (Peugeot 508 1.6 e HDi 109g CO_{2}/km) or also Auto Zeitung Best Imported Family Car 2011 (readers' votes).

=== Technical highlights ===
Peugeot has equipped the 508 for the market in Europe with its HDI common rail diesel engines. The 1.6-litre HDI 112 can be fitted with the e HDI 'micro hybrid' system, including an electronically controlled automatic gearbox, which reduces fuel consumption to 4.20 L/100 km; 56.0 mpg_{‑US} (67.2 mpg_{‑imp}) with CO_{2} emissions of 109 g/km.

Though this matches the Volkswagen Passat Bluemotion, it features a slightly larger fuel tank which allows it to cover a slightly longer range of 1637 kilometres (1017 miles). At least two e HDI engines were available from 2011 to 2012. The first engines had an emission level of 114 g/km. The later model reduces emissions to 109 g/km. A modified air intake is the main reason for the improvement.

The 508 range also included PSA's HYbrid4 diesel electric hybrid powertrain, which reduced fuel consumption further, to 3.80 L/100 km; 61.9 mpg_{‑US} (74.3 mpg_{‑imp}) with CO_{2} emissions of 99 g/km.

The top GT version comes with a 201 bhp (150 kW; 204 PS), 2.2-litre turbodiesel engine which generates 458 N⋅m (338 lbf⋅ft) of torque. It comes mated solely to a six speed torque converter automatic gearbox which offers manual shifts via paddles or a central selector.

=== Safety ===
ANCAP test results* Peugeot 508 all variants (2011)
| Test | Score |
|---|---|
| Overall | 5 /5 stars |
| Frontal offset | 14.64/16 |
| Side impact | 15.46/16 |
| Pole | 2/2 |
| Seat belt reminders | 3/3 |
| Whiplash protection | Good |
| Pedestrian protection | Marginal |
| Electronic stability control | Standard |

From a system which rates to a maximum of five stars, the 508 received a five star rating by Euro NCAP in 2011. The score was:

Euro NCAP test results* Peugeot 508 (2011)
| Test | Points | % |
|---|---|---|
| Overall: | 5 /5 stars | |
| Adult occupant: | 32 | 90% |
| Child occupant: | 43 | 87% |
| Pedestrian: | 15 | 41% |
| Safety assist: | 7 | 97% |

=== 508 RXH ===
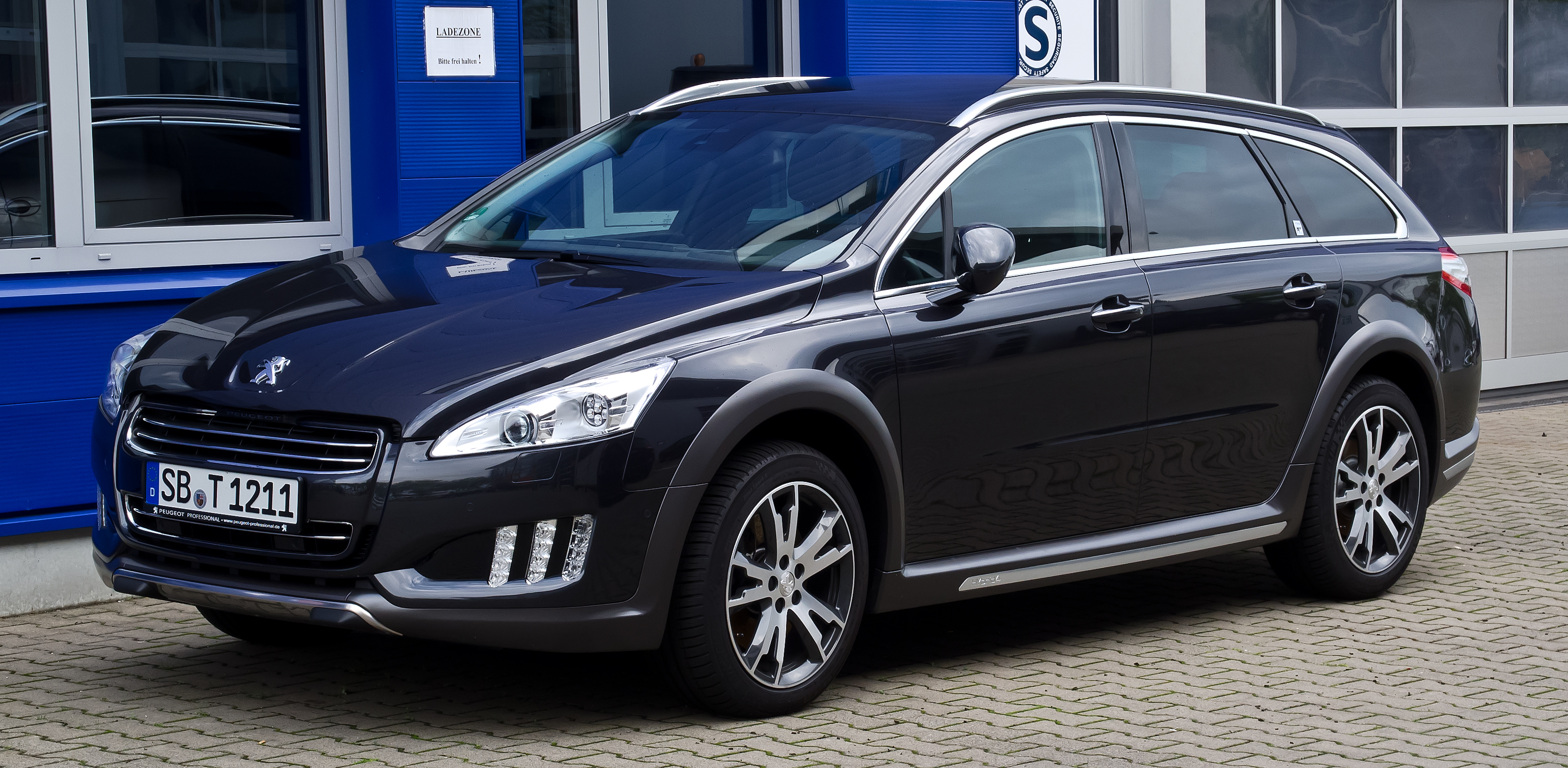

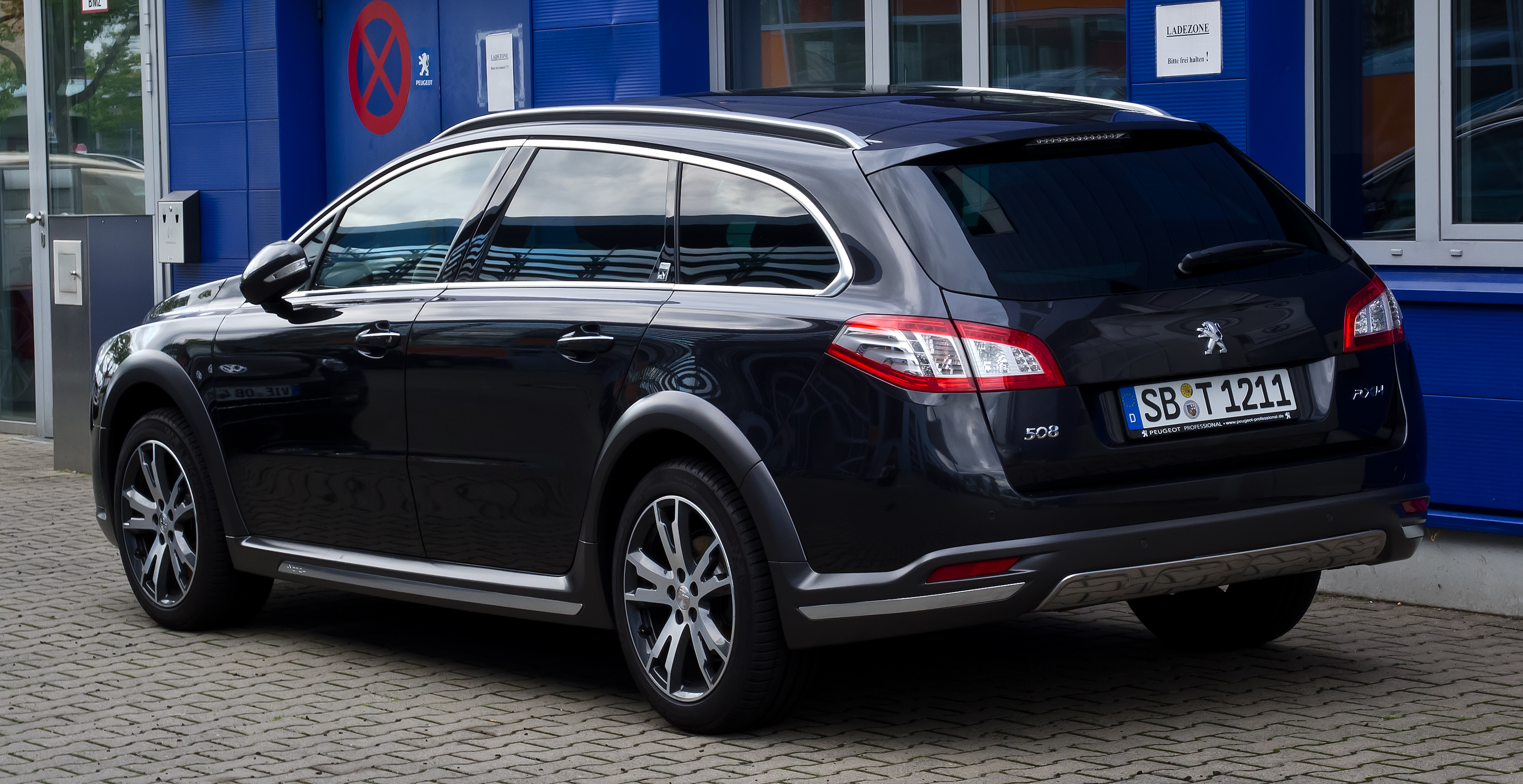
2012 Peugeot 508 RXH in Düsseldorf, Germany

At the 2011 Frankfurt Motor Show, Peugeot revealed a hybrid-electric crossover estate de luxe variant of the 508. To distinguish it from other 508 models, the RXH features flared wheel arches, as well as a new color-coded grille with three columns of LED daytime running lights on each side.

The Hybrid4 powertrain combines a 120 kW (163hp) 2.0-litre HDi FAP diesel engine with a 27 kW (37hp) electric motor to lower fuel consumption to 4.2 L/100 km. The powertrain offers four working modes:

AUTO, in which the vehicle strives for the best fuel economy, throttle response is slow and the automated manual transmission shifts early, furthermore the vehicle switches to ZEV mode as often as possible.

SPORT mode offers a combined power output of 150kW (200hp) and 450Nm at speeds up to 120km/h, throttle response is very aggressive and the engine revs up to 4000RPM before upshifts.

4WD mode keeps the HDi engine running constantly and charging the high voltage battery to offer constant 4WD at speeds up to 120km/h.

ZEV mode is available if the high voltage battery is at least 1/3 full. In this mode, the vehicle moves only via the rear electric motor and the performance is limited. ZEV mode is available at speeds of up to ~60km/h with moderate acceleration, the range on a full charge is about ~2miles (~3km), the A/C compressor is automatically switched off in this mode. If the driver presses the accelerator beyond a certain point, the HDi engine restarts automatically as to offer better acceleration and the vehicle goes to AUTO mode. Auto Start Stop is available in all modes except for 4WD when the engine is constantly running so that the reversible alternator can top up the battery and provide constant rear drive.

The engine automatically shuts down whenever possible (cruising downhill at speeds of up to 85km/h when the battery is not fully charged or cruising on a level surface at speeds of up to ~60km/h), when coming to a stop the HDi engine shuts down at speeds below 30km/h. Restarting can occur at any moment, if the HYbrid4 control unit determines that additional power is needed; or the battery needs to be topped up; or the A/C compressor needs to kick in.

The engine also restarts when the battery is fully charged and the vehicle is going downhill, as to offer additional engine braking, no fuel is used in this mode, but ZERO EMISSION is not displayed, as the HDi engine is rotating. The battery consist of 42 packs of four D-size SANYO batteries (201.6V nominal, ranging from 168V to 250V during use). To offer a longer battery pack life the HCU (hybrid control unit) never charges the batteries over 90% of their capacity, nor discharges them under 30%.

The 508 RXH HYbrid4 also has raised ground clearance of 184mm - 30mm more than the standard 508 SW and 508 HYbrid4.

The RXH was released in the beginning of 2012. The 508 RXH was launched in a single high spec limited-edition version, before a full range became available. It is competing with the Audi A4 Allroad, the Volvo XC70, the Passat Alltrack or even more, the BMW 3 Series XDrive.

=== 508 coupé by Peugeot ===
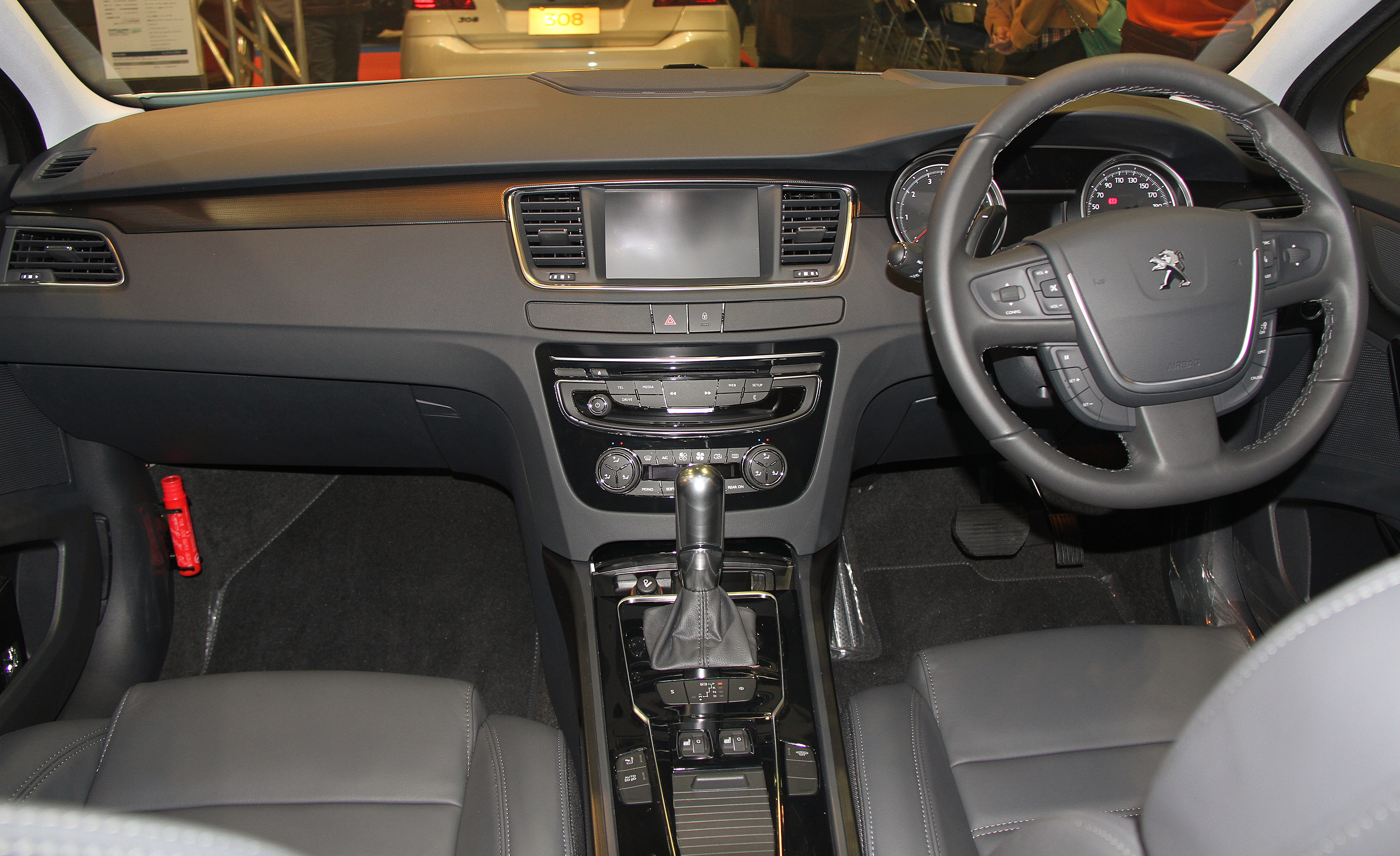
Interior

A concept "hybrid power" car prefiguring the style of the future 508 coupé, called the Peugeot SR1, was presented at the Geneva Motor Show in March 2010.

Sources reported that the Peugeot SR1 would go on sale in 2012.

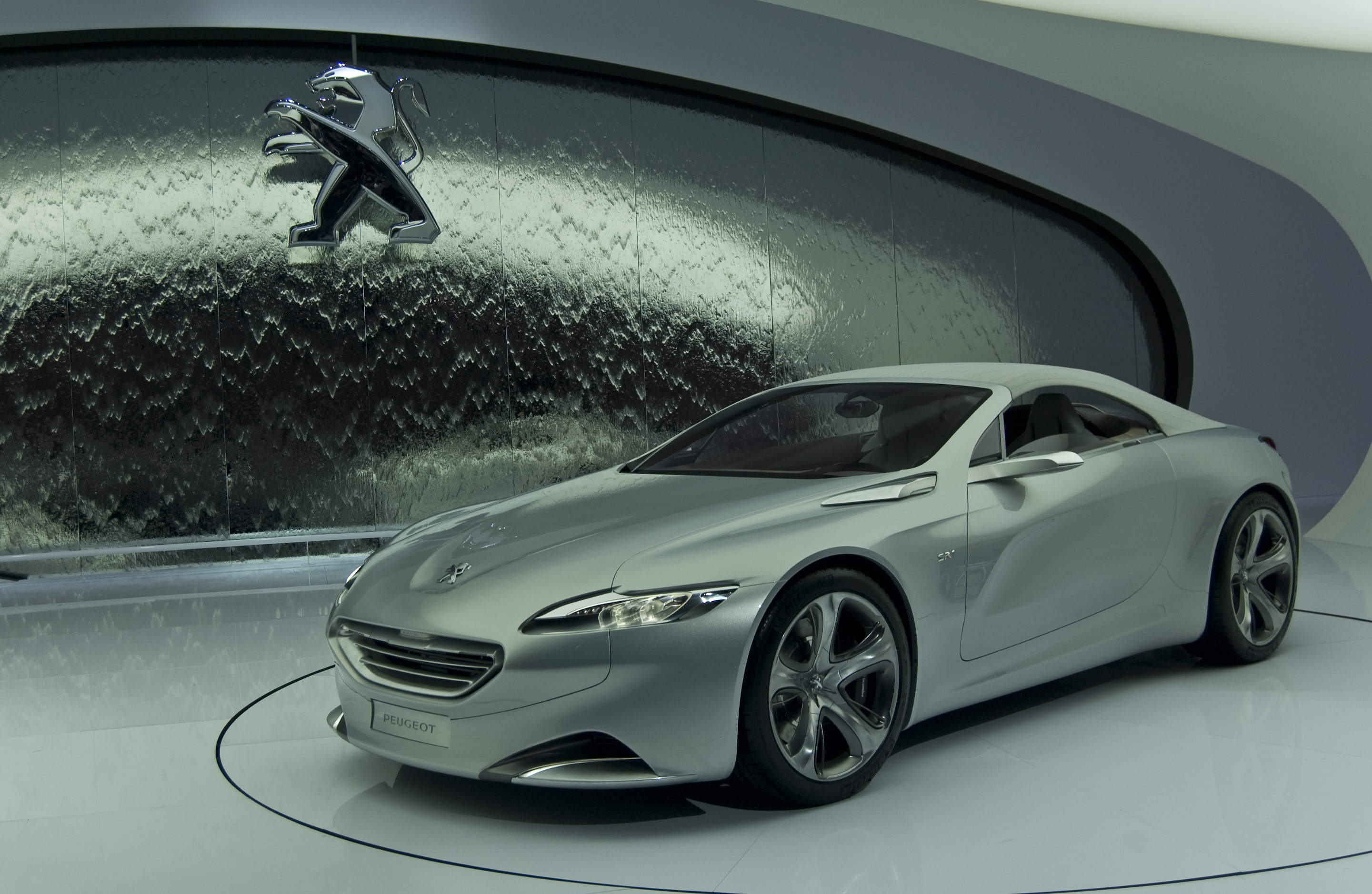
Peugeot SR1 (concept)

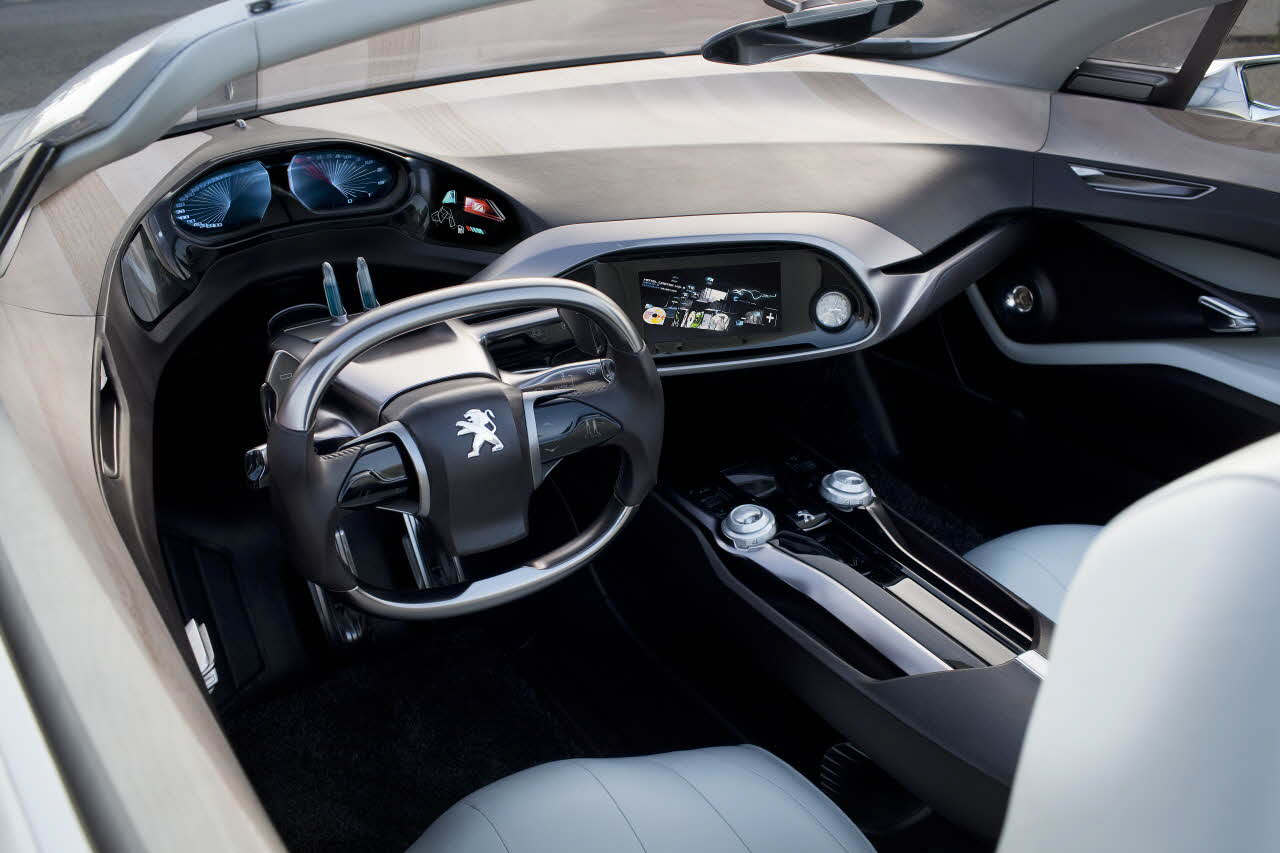
Peugeot SR1 Concept (dashboard)

The Peugeot 508 has been equipped 1.8 THP engines, which is only sold in China. The 1.8 THP engine's power is 150 kW (201 hp) at 5,500 rpm and 280 N⋅m (207 lb⋅ft) of torque at 1,400–4,000 rpm.

=== Gallery ===
Pre-facelift styling

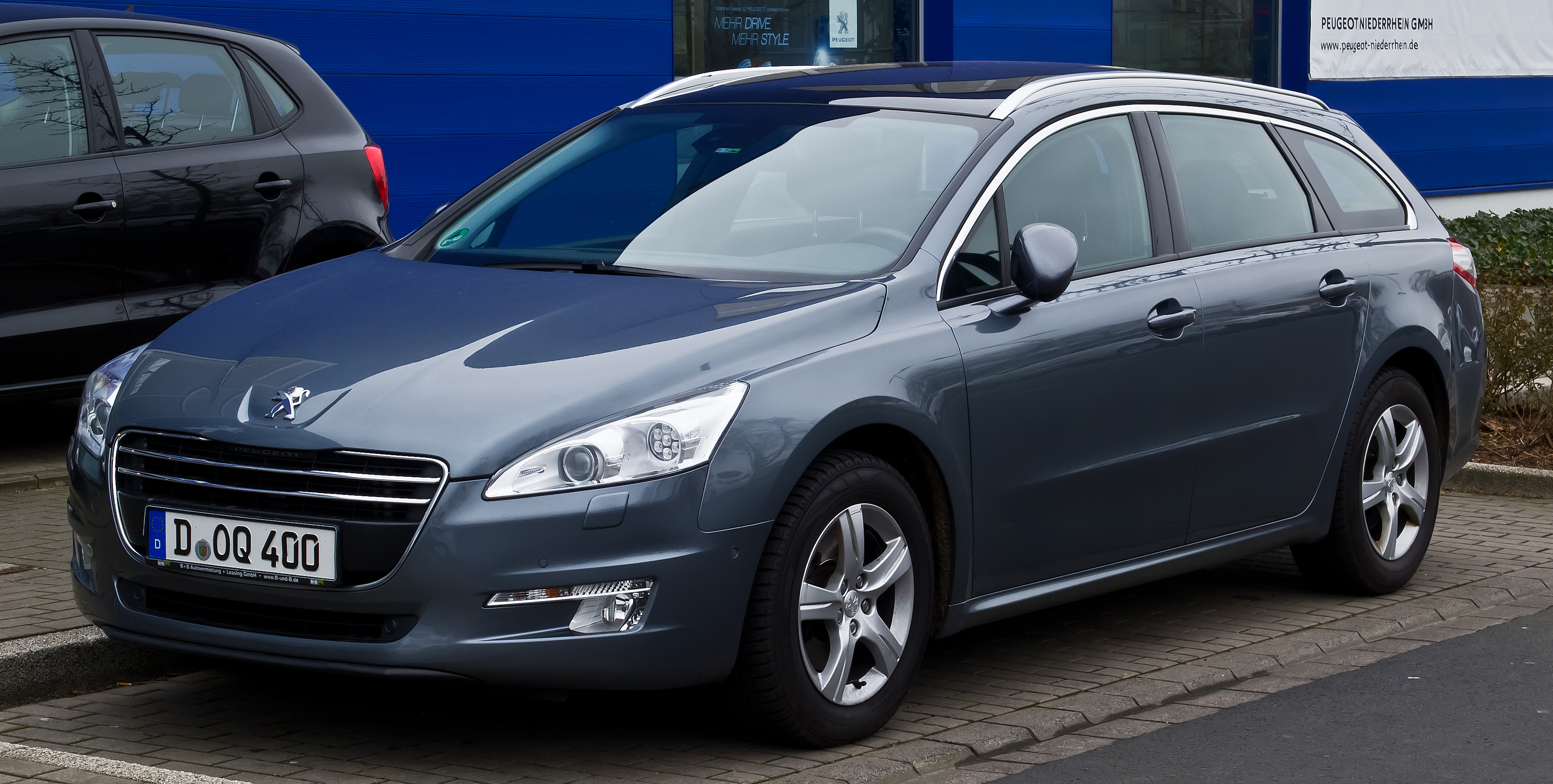
SW (pre-facelift)

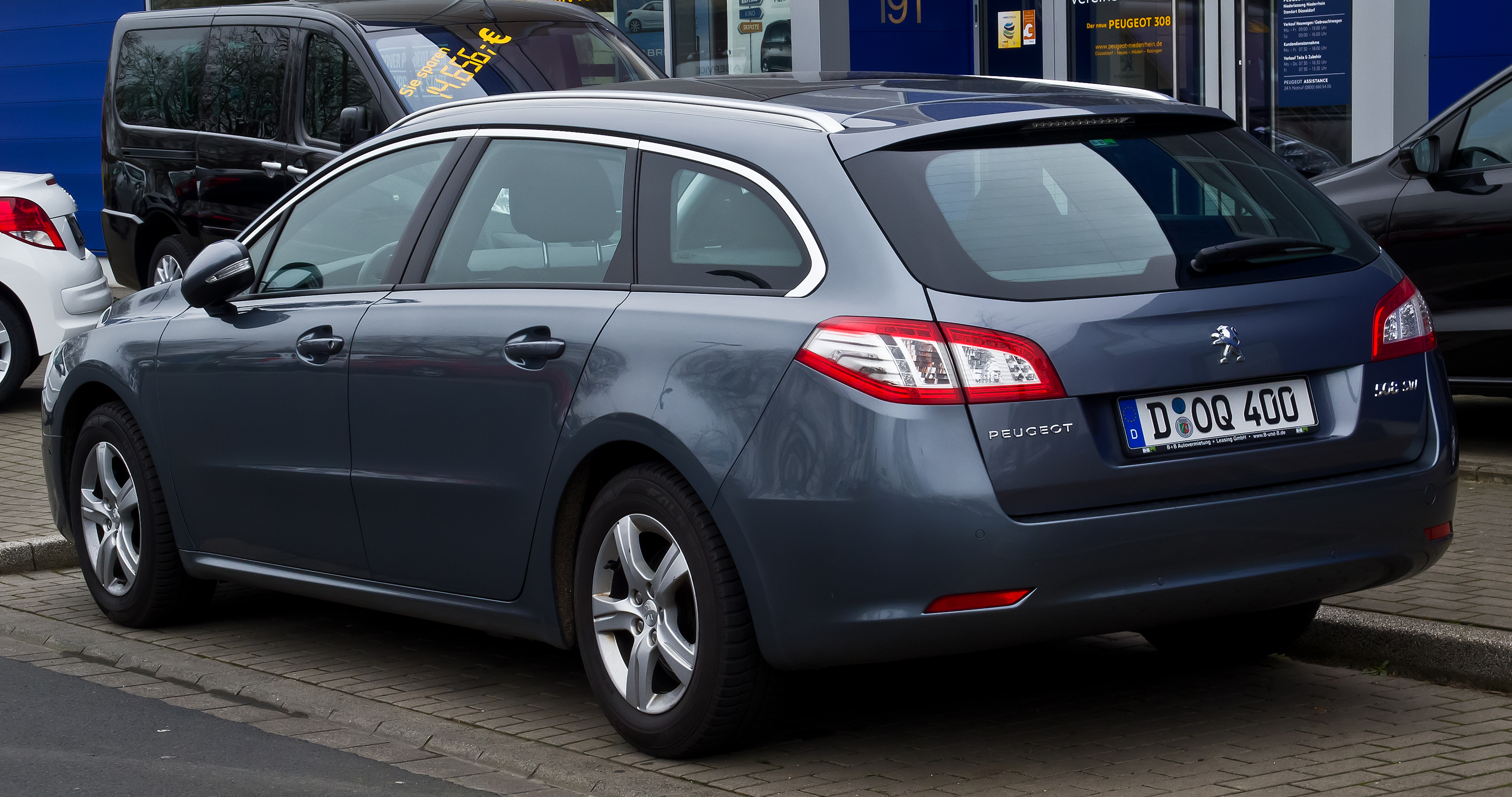
SW (pre-facelift)

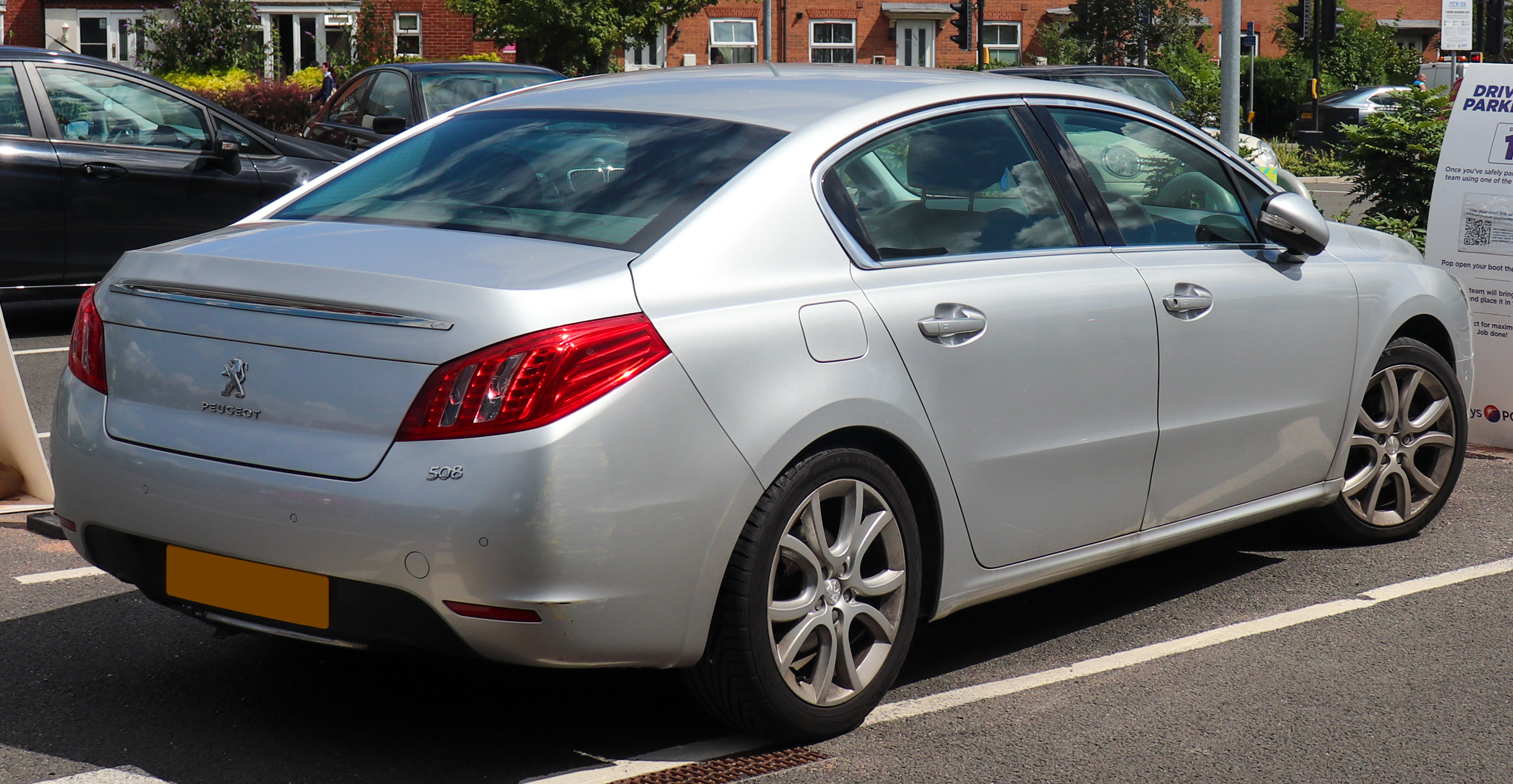
Saloon (pre-facelift)

Post facelift styling

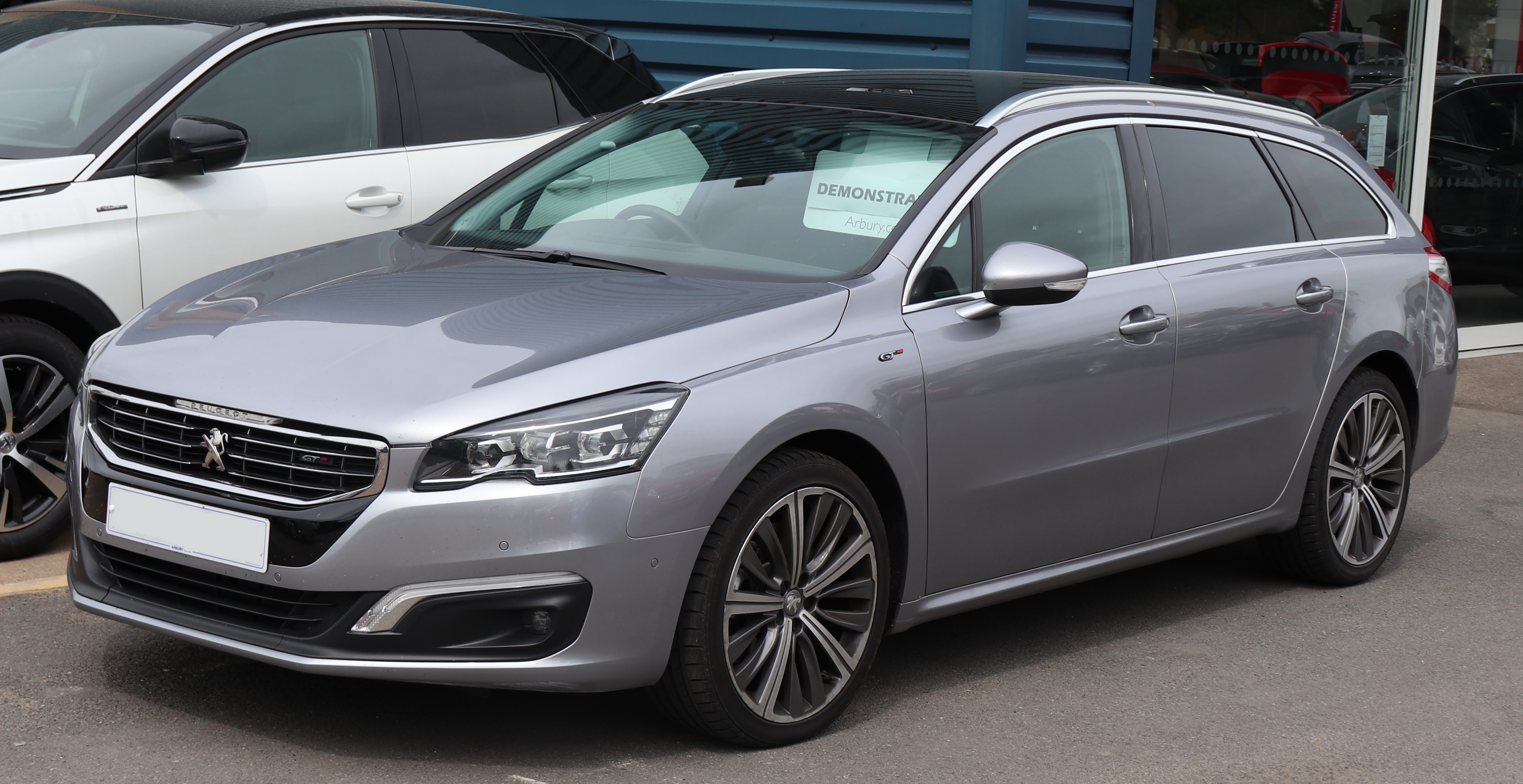
SW (facelift)

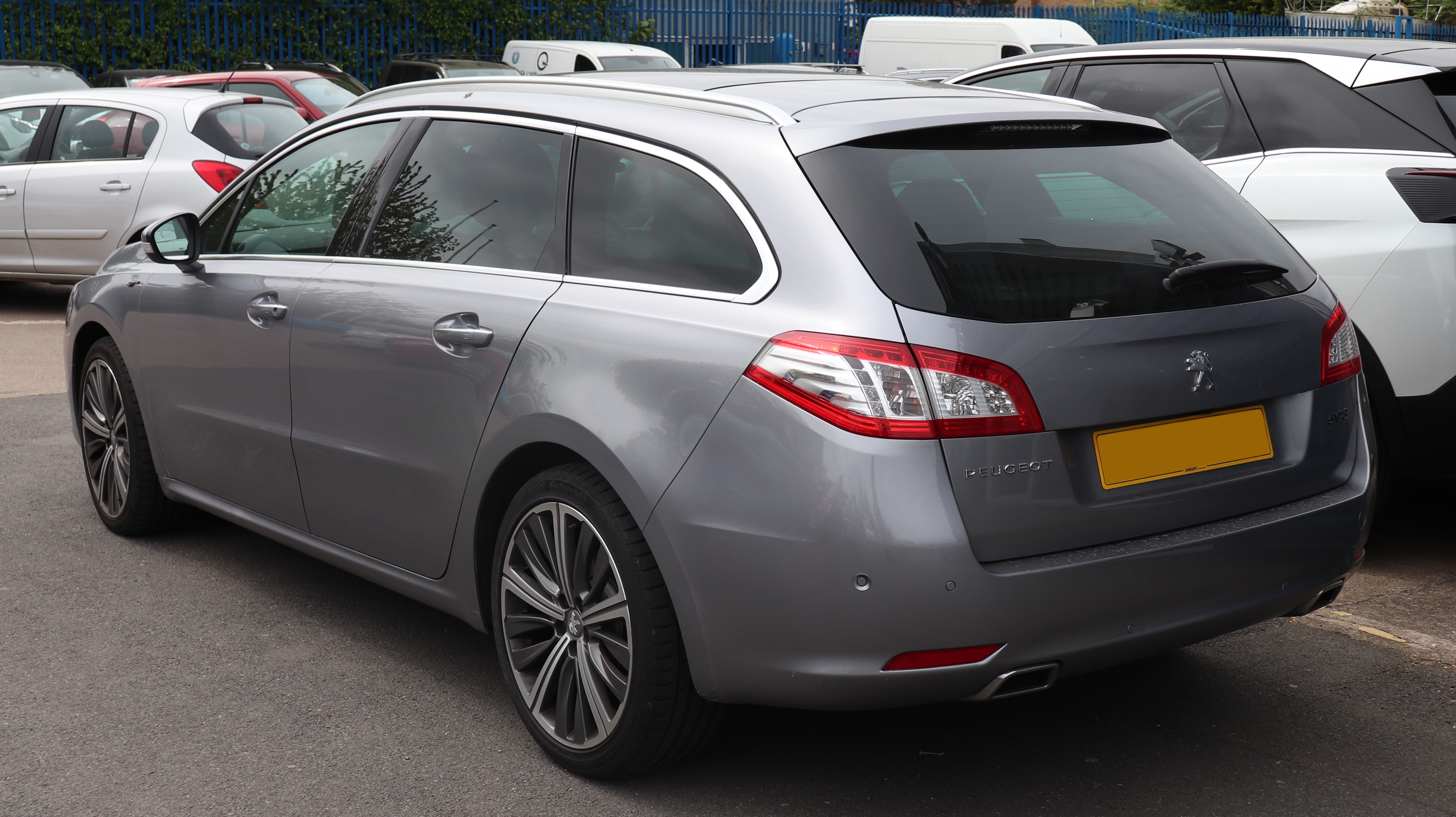
SW (facelift)

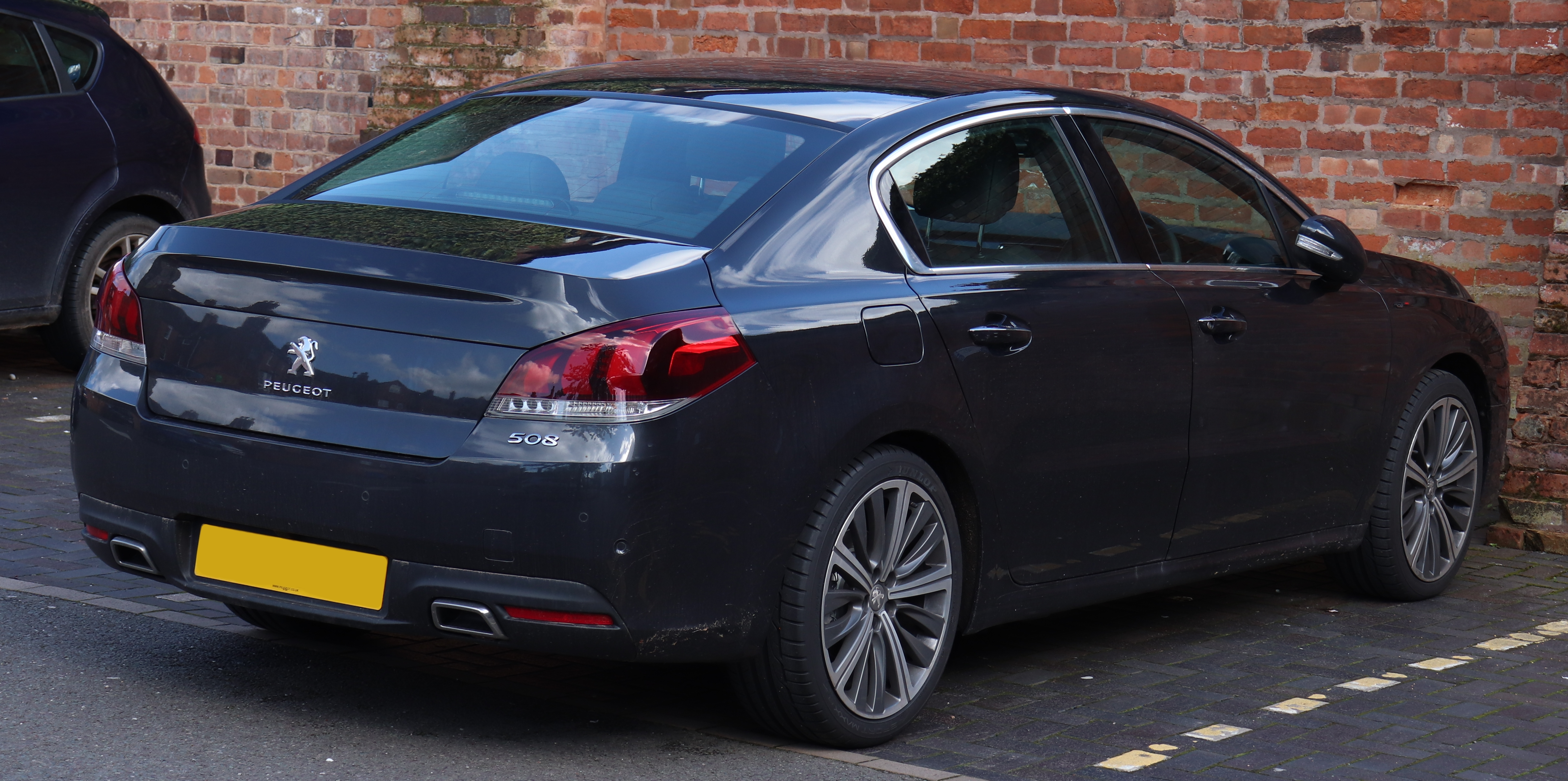
Saloon (facelift)

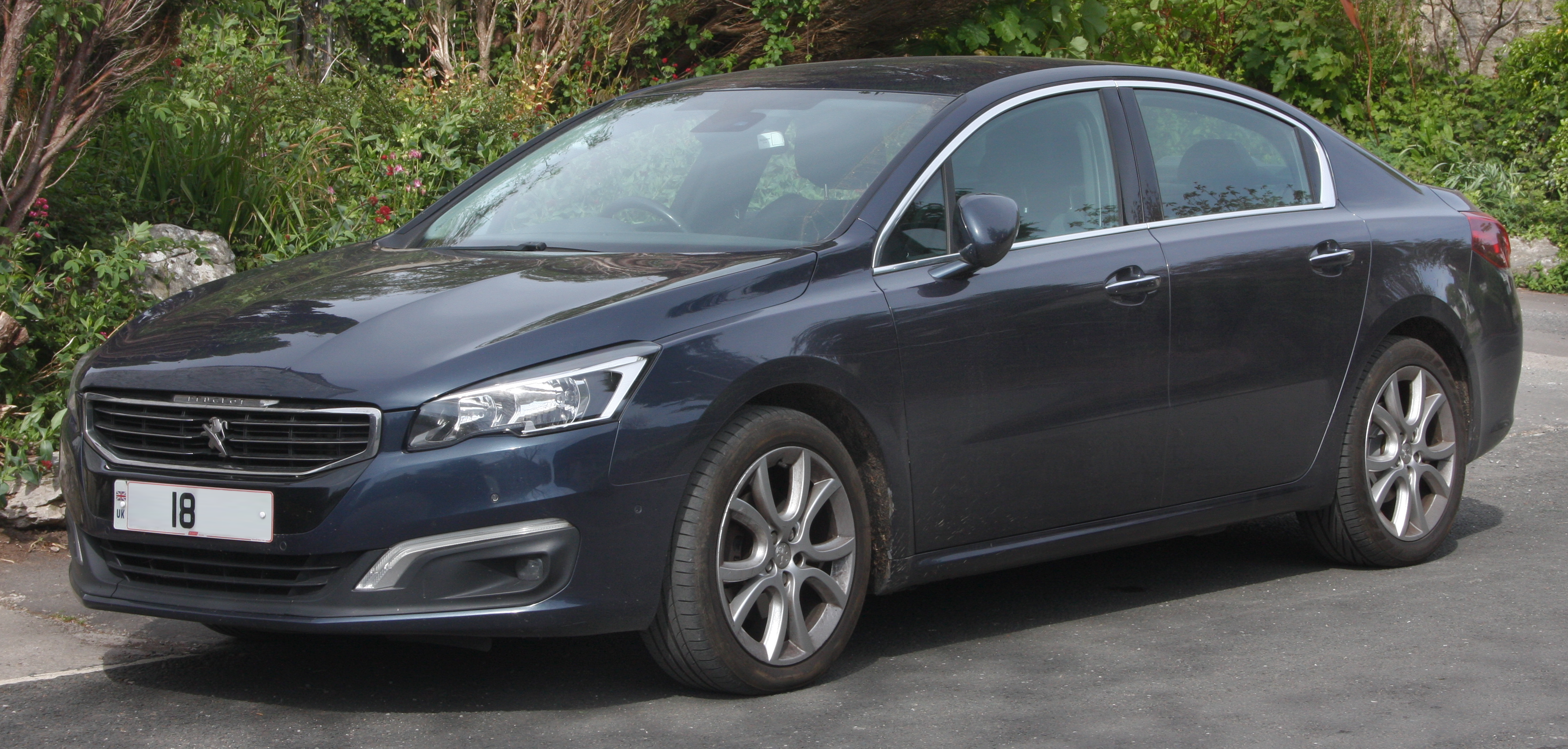
Saloon (facelift)

== Second generation (R83; 2018) ==
Second generation
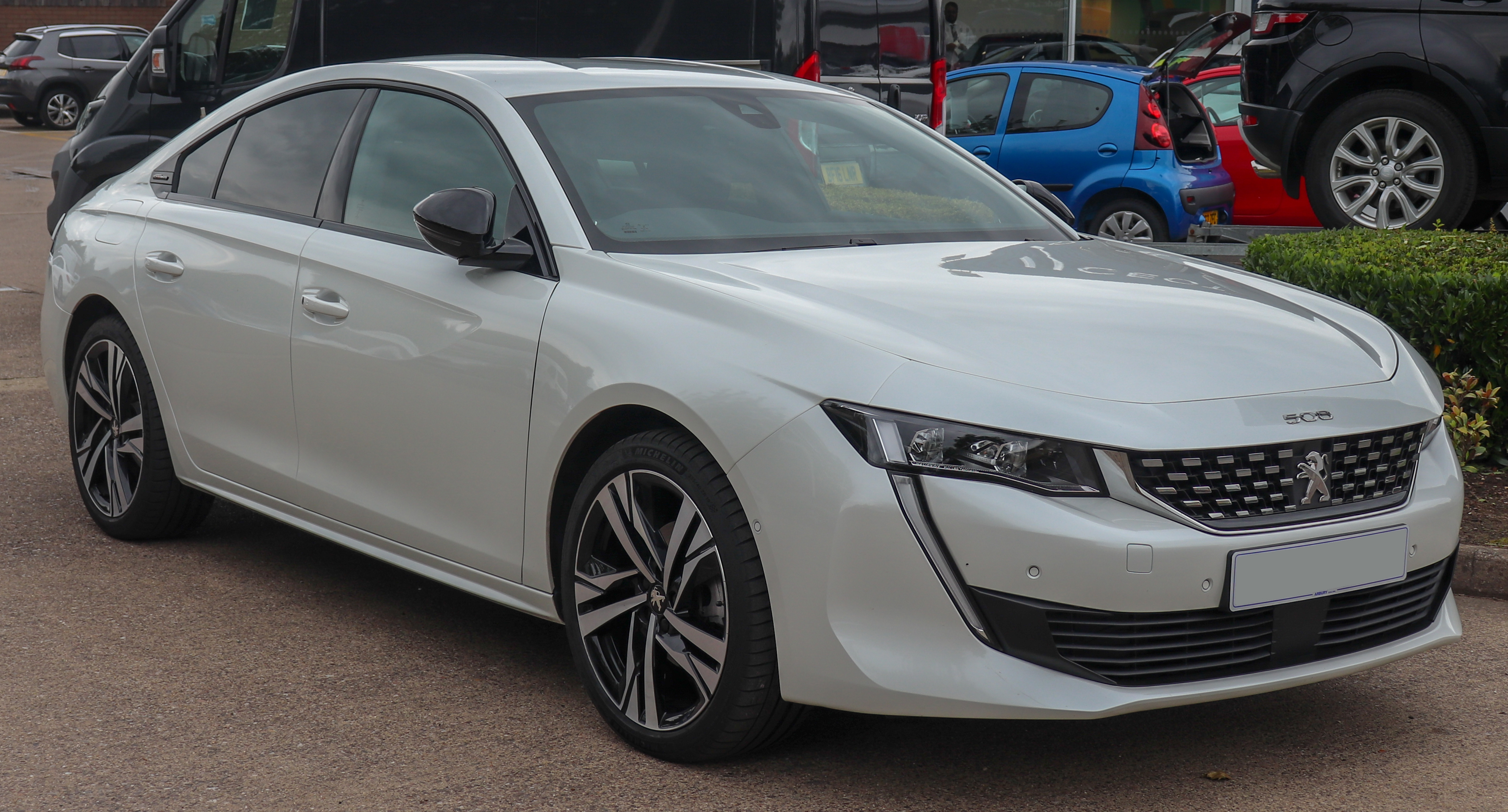

Overview
- Model code: R83
- Also called: Peugeot 508L (China); FMC P5 (Iran)
- Production: 2018–2025; 2018–2024 (RHD); 2018–present (China)
- Assembly: France: Mulhouse (Mulhouse Plant); China: Wuhan (DPCA); Iran: Semnan (FMC)
- Designer: Giovanni Rizzo (exterior, liftback); Sylvain Henry (exterior, estate)

Body and chassis
- Body style: 5-door liftback 5-door estate 4-door saloon (508L)
- Platform: PSA EMP2 platform
- Related: Citroën C5 X DS 9 DS 7 Crossback; Citroën C6 II; Dongfeng Fengshen A9

Powertrain
- Engine: Petrol: 1.2 L Turbocharger PureTech (EB2ADTS) I3; 1.6 L Turbocharger PureTech (EP6FDT) I4; Petrol PHEV: 1.6 L Turbocharger PureTech (EP6FDT) I4; 1.6 L Turbocharger PureTech PSE (EP6FDT) I4; Diesel: 1.5 L Ford DV5 BlueHDi I4; 2.0 L PSA DW10FC BlueHDi I4
- Electric motor: Synchronous Electric Motor (PHEV version)
- Transmission: 6-speed PSA MB6 manual (1.5 Diesel); 6-speed PSA ML manual (2.0 Diesel); 6-speed PSA / Aisin EAT6 automatic (Middle East); 8-speed PSA / Aisin EAT8 automatic

Dimensions
- Wheelbase: 2,795 mm (110.0 in); 2,848 mm (112.1 in) (508L)
- Length: 4,750 mm (187.0 in); 4,870 mm (191.7 in) (508L)
- Width: 1,859 mm (73.2 in); 1,855 mm (73.0 in) (508L)
- Height: 1,403 mm (55.2 in); 1,455 mm (57.3 in) (508L)
- Curb weight: 1,495–1,761 kg (3,296–3,882 lb)

A second generation was announced by Peugeot in February 2018, and was officially unveiled at the Geneva Motor Show in March 2018. The estate version was rumoured in May 2018, announced in June and was officially unveiled at the 2018 Paris Motor Show. The design is inspired by the Instinct shooting brake concept, shown at the 2017 Geneva Motor Show. It won the "Most Beautiful Car of The Year 2018" award at the International Automobile Festival, where the Peugeot e-Legend also won "The Most Beautiful Concept Car of The Year".

In terms of powertrain options, the new 508 has petrol engine options, both 1.6 litre PureTech turbocharged engines, with different power outputs; and three turbodiesel options, and is the first passenger vehicle sold under the Peugeot brand to be based on a stretched version of the EMP2 platform. The automatic transmission has been updated to an eight speed Aisin EAT8 unit, replacing the older EAT6 units. A plug-in hybrid version was revealed in September 2019.

In May 2019, the 508 debuted in the market in the Middle East, featuring the carryover 165 hp 1.6 litre engine, and the six speed automatic of the previous generation.

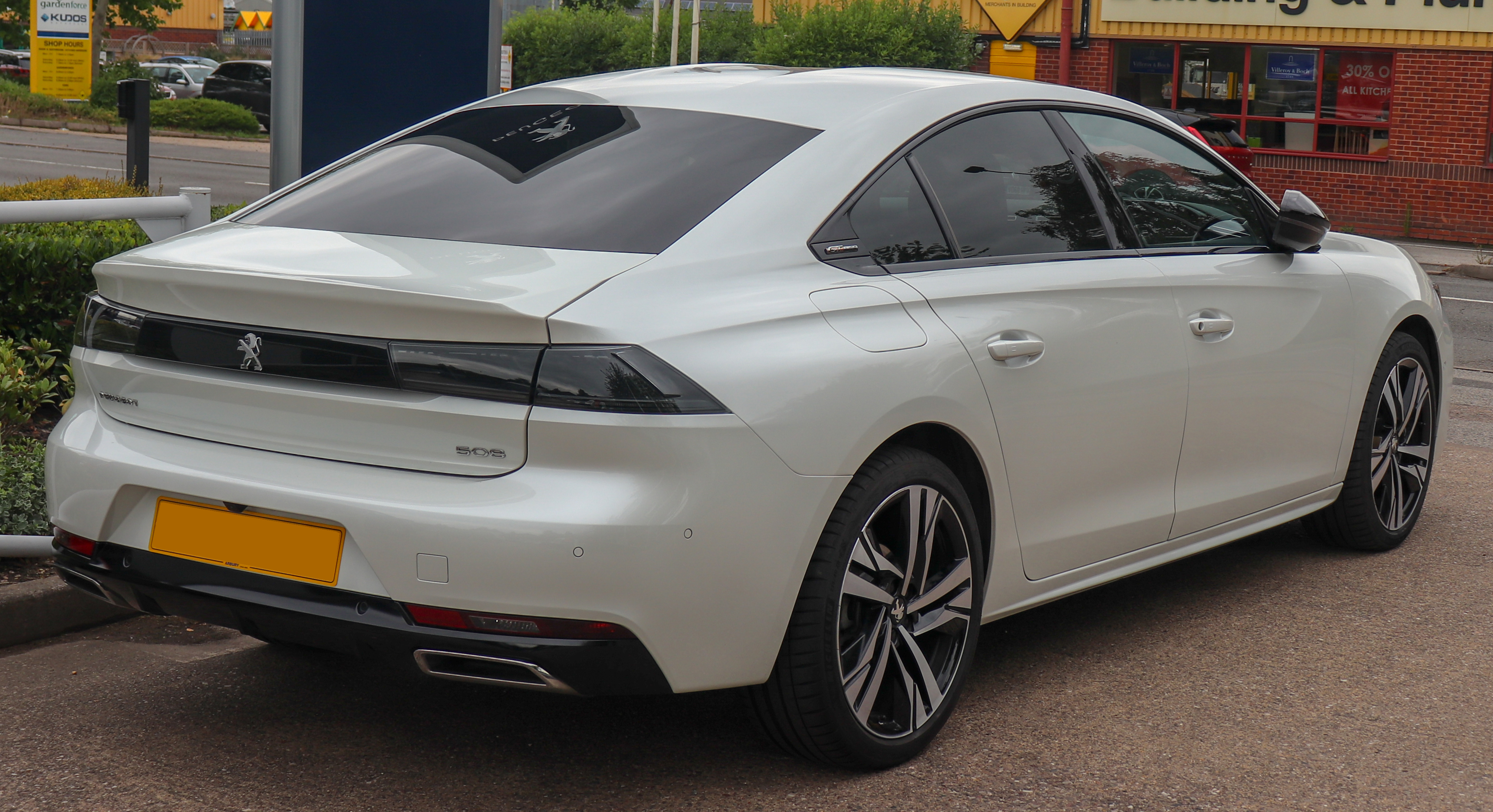
Pre-facelift Saloon

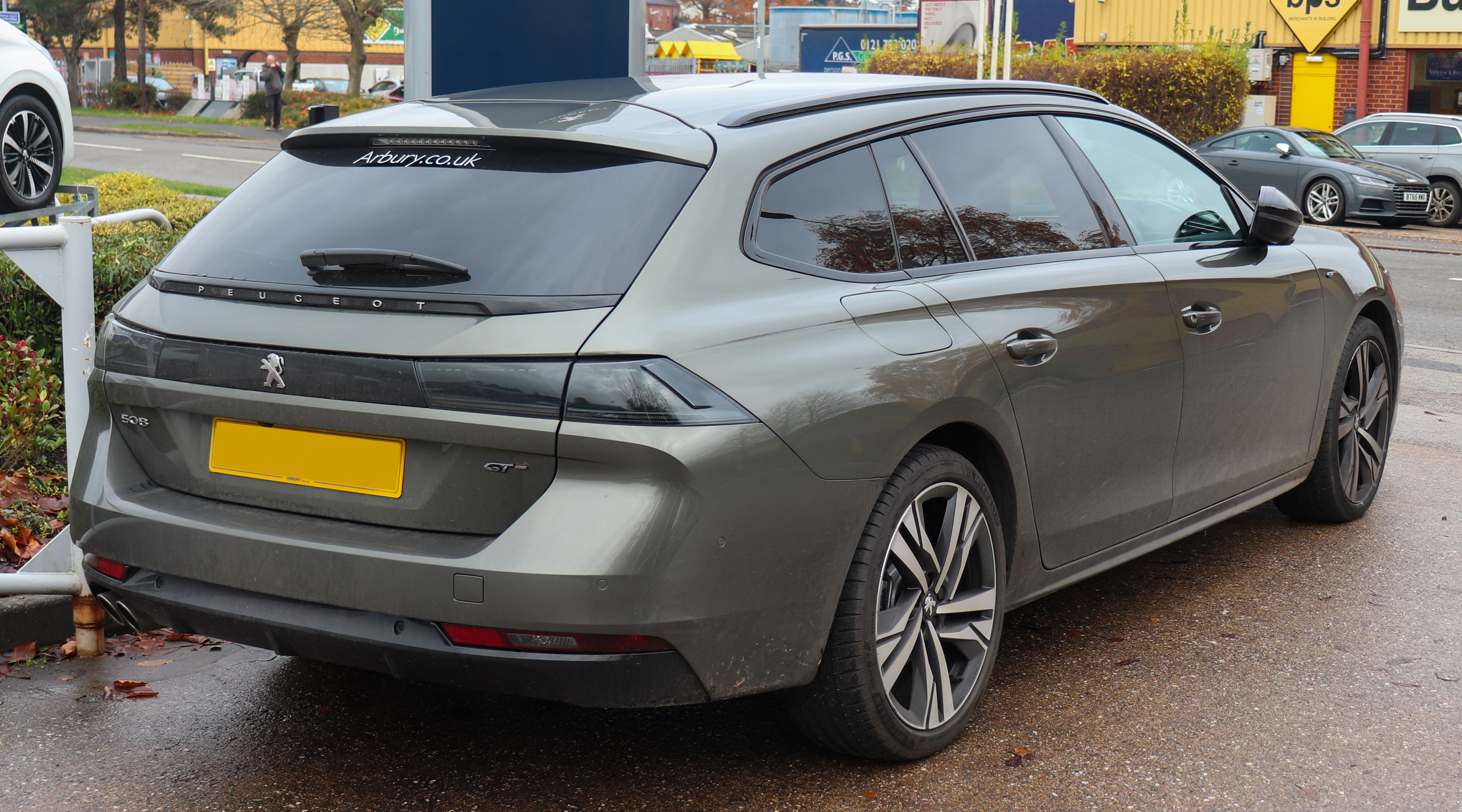
Pre-facelift SW

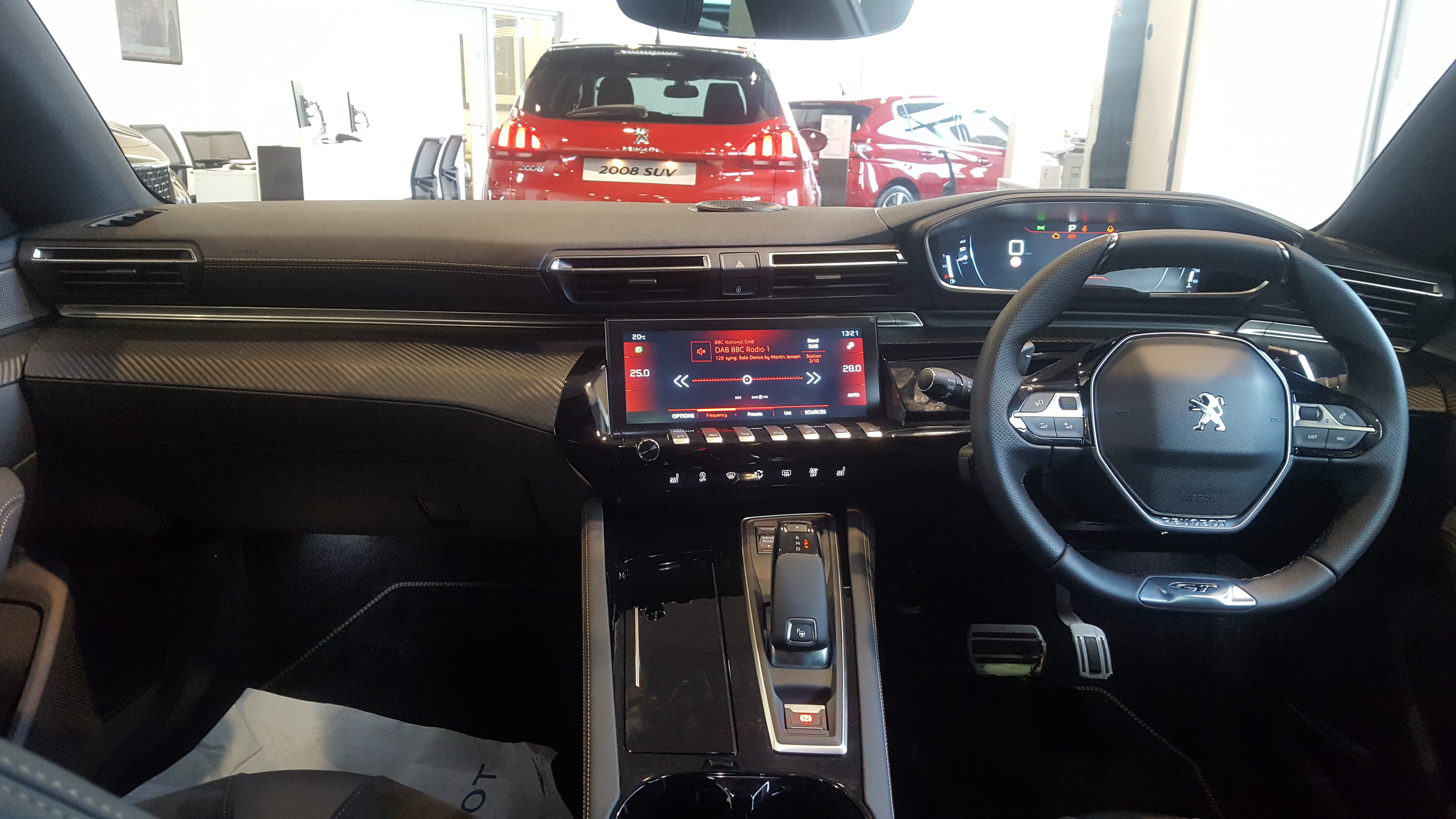
Interior

=== Facelift (2023) ===
Unveiled on February 24, 2023, the facelift features a revised front end that includes the brand's new logo alongside a new infotainment system.

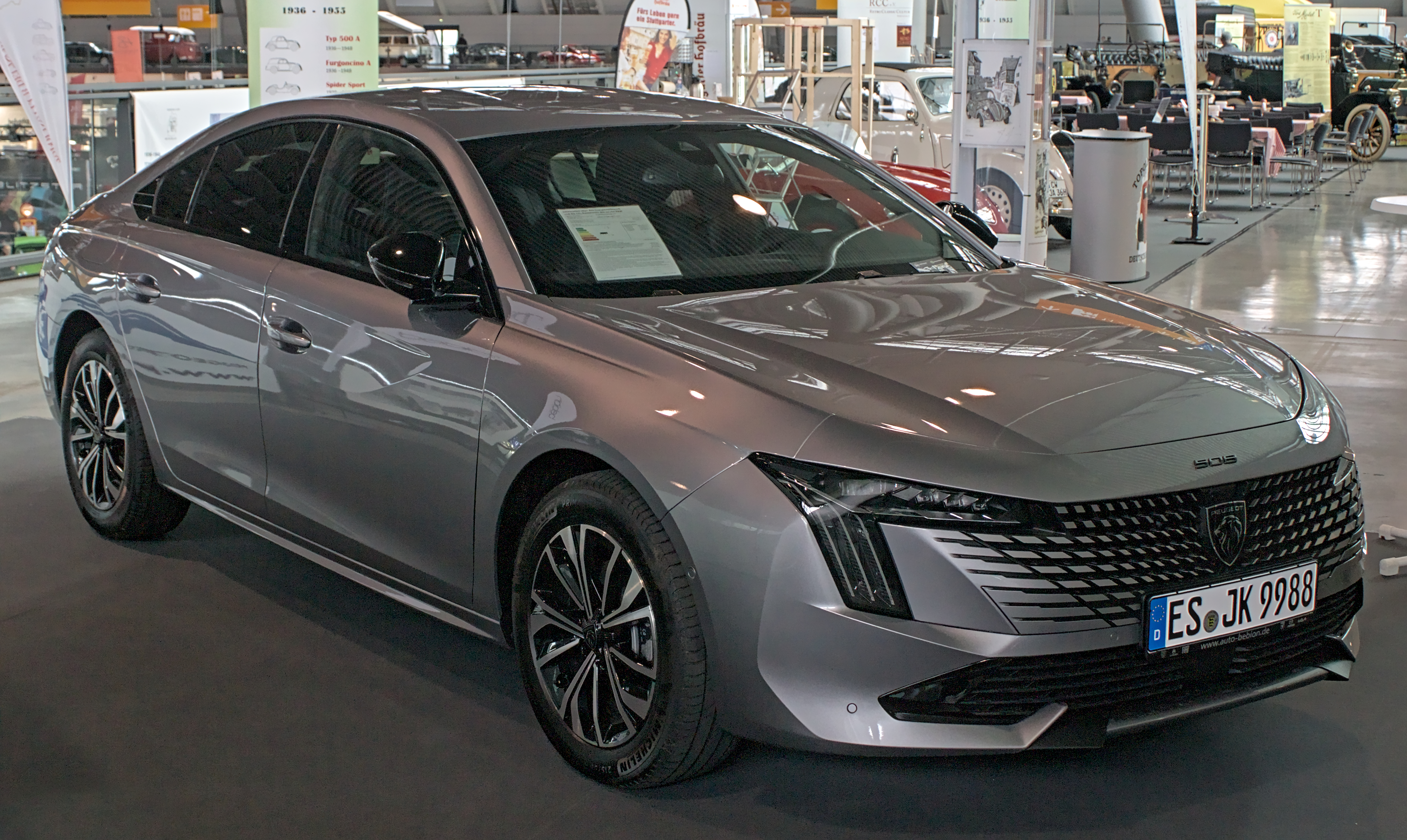
Facelift Peugeot 508

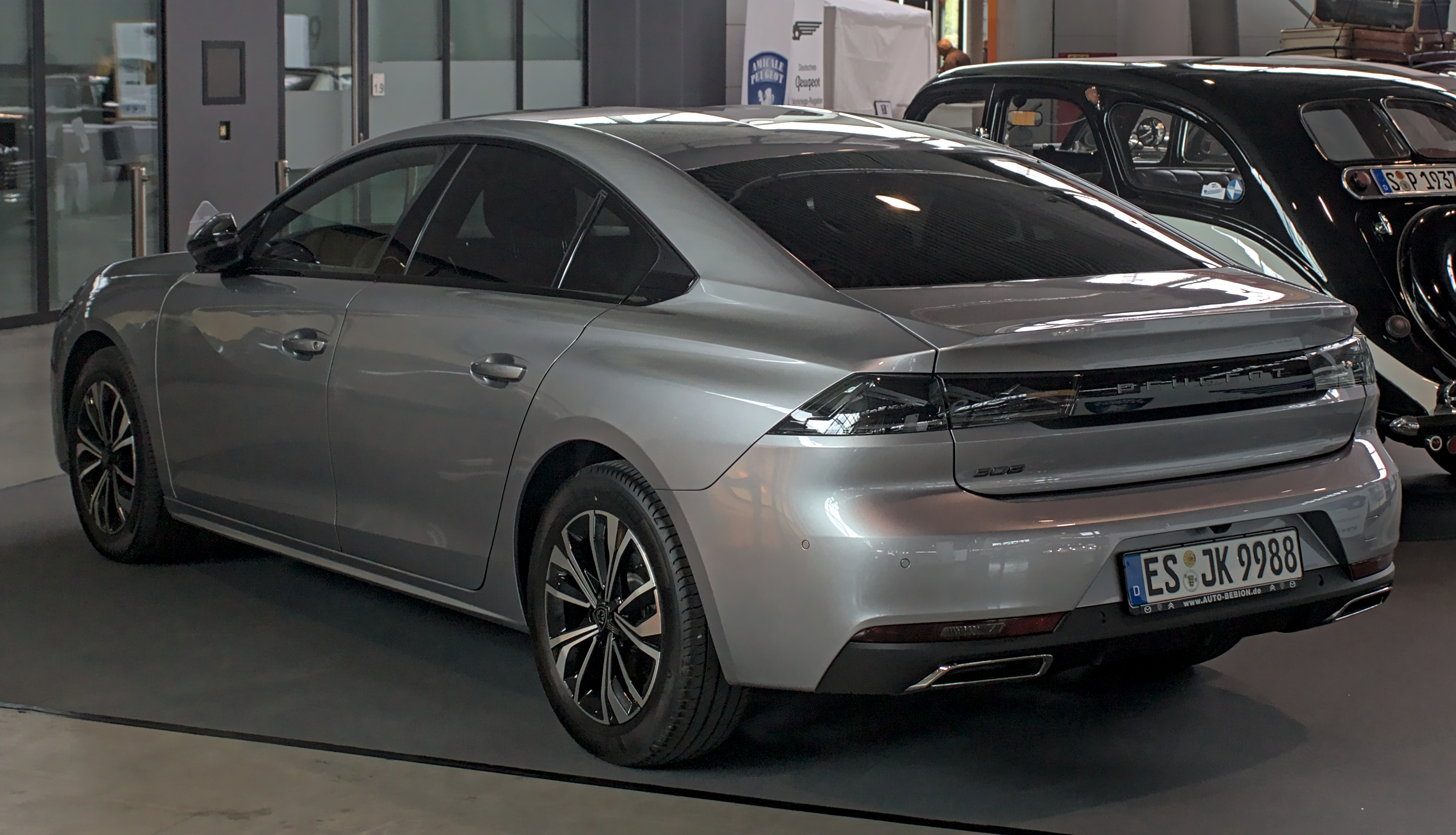
Rear view

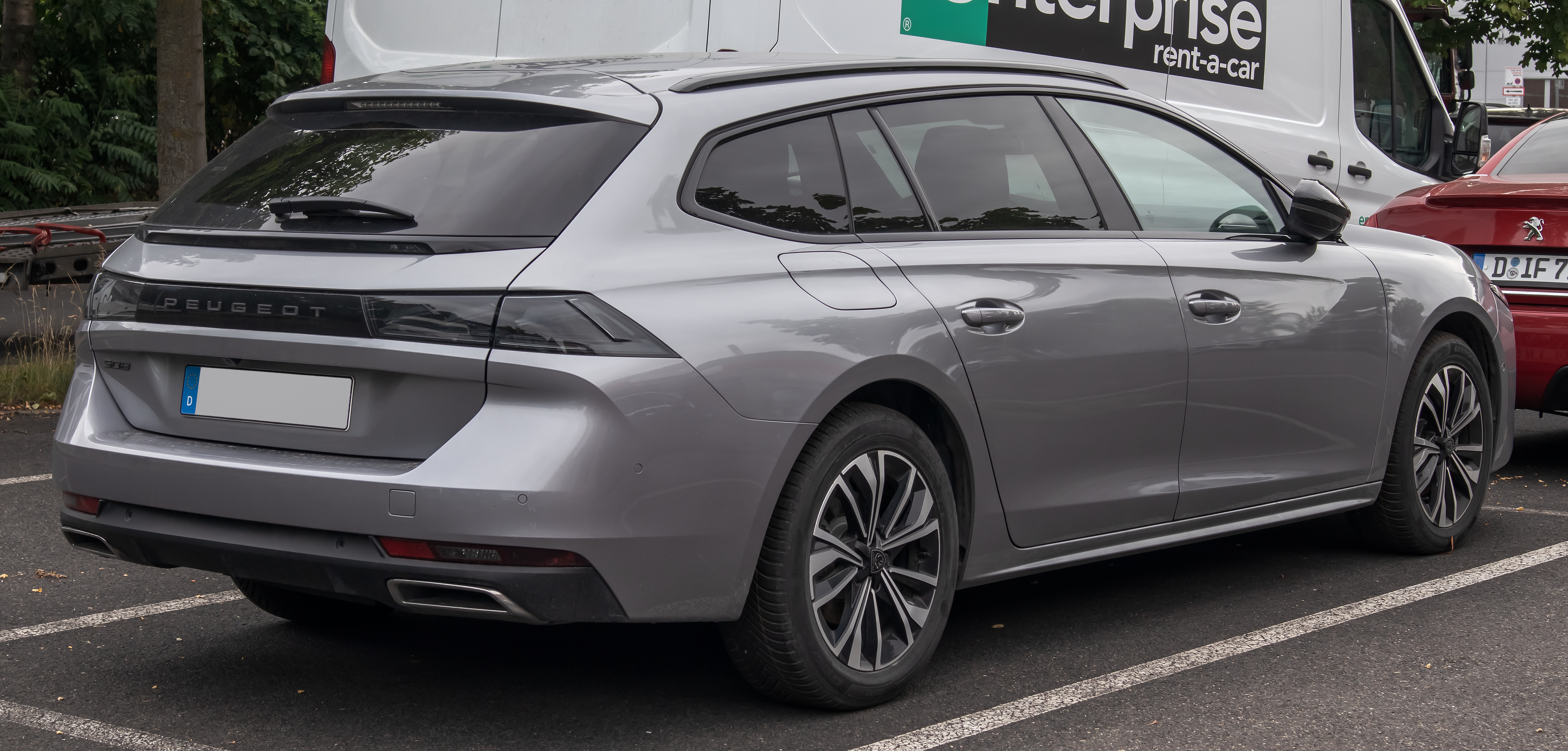
Facelift Peugeot 508 SW

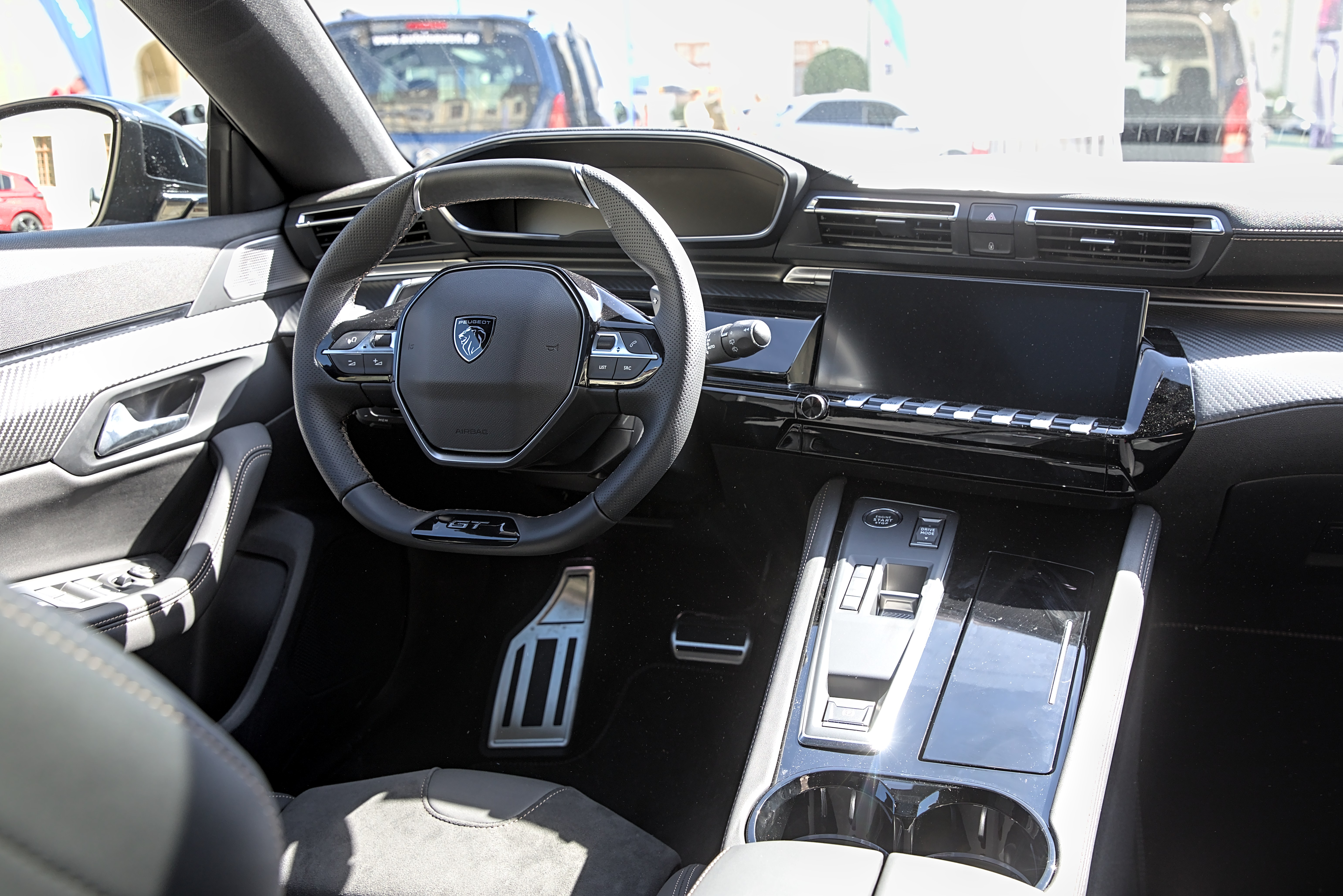
Interior

=== 508L (China) ===
The Peugeot 508L premiered at the 2018 Guangzhou Auto Show in China. Compared to the European 508 model, the 508L exclusive to China has a 55 mm (2.2 in) longer wheelbase, making the length of the 508L wheelbase 2,848 mm (112.1 in). The Chinese 508L version is also 100 mm (3.9 in) longer overall than the 508 sold in Europe, at 4,870 mm (192 in).

Another difference between the two versions is in the rear with the five-door liftback configuration of the European 508 being replaced by a conventional trunk, making the 508L a traditional four-door sedan in China. Stylingwise, the frameless doors of the European 508 was replaced with framed ones for the 508L.

It received a facelift mid-2023.

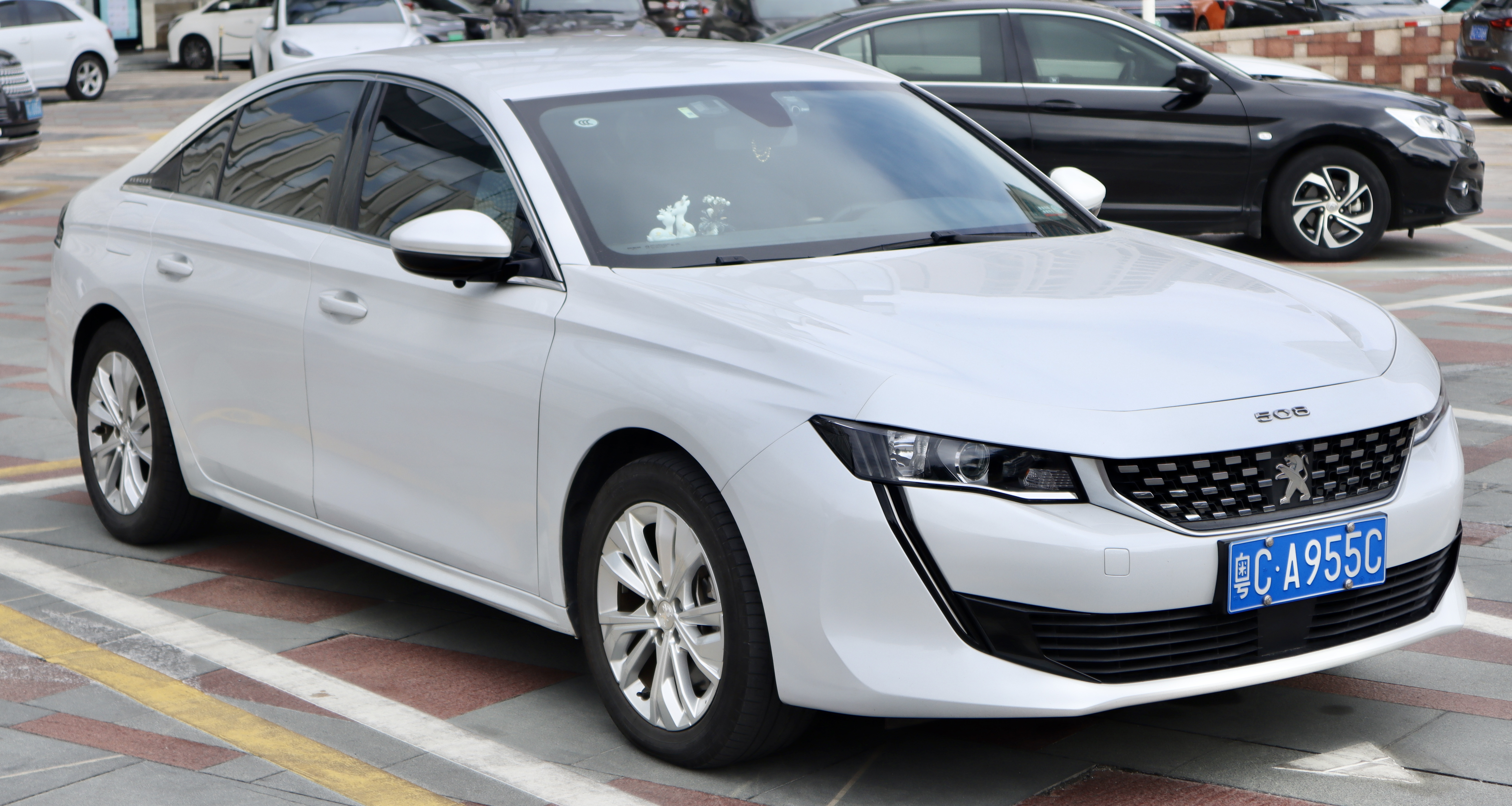
Pre-facelift 508L (front view)

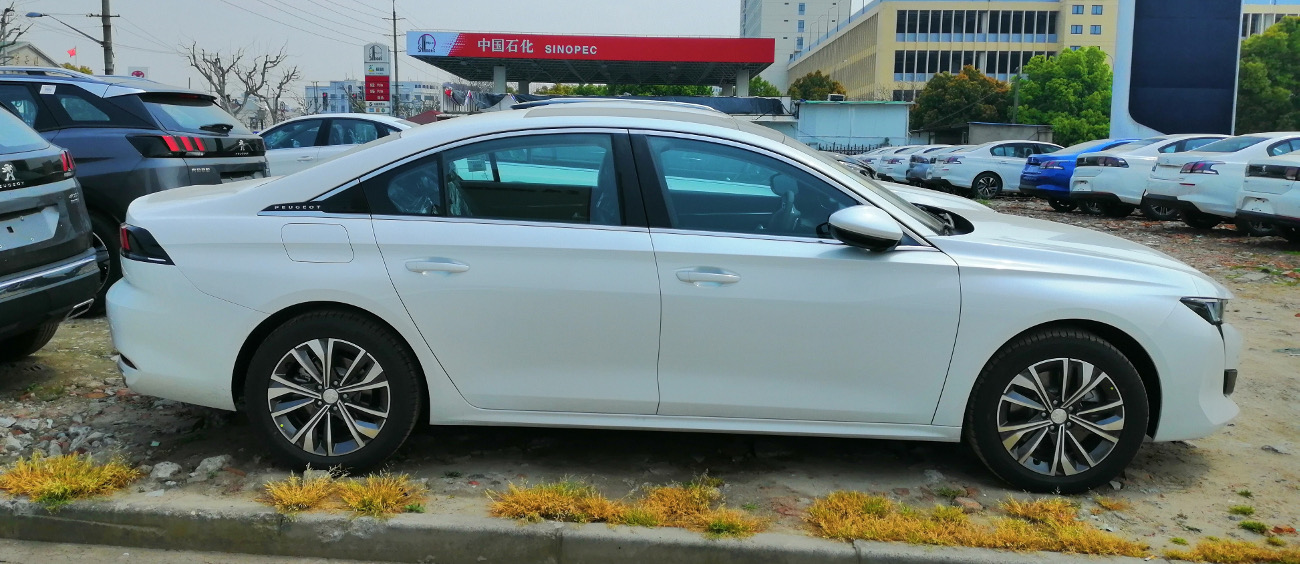
Pre-facelift 508L (side view)

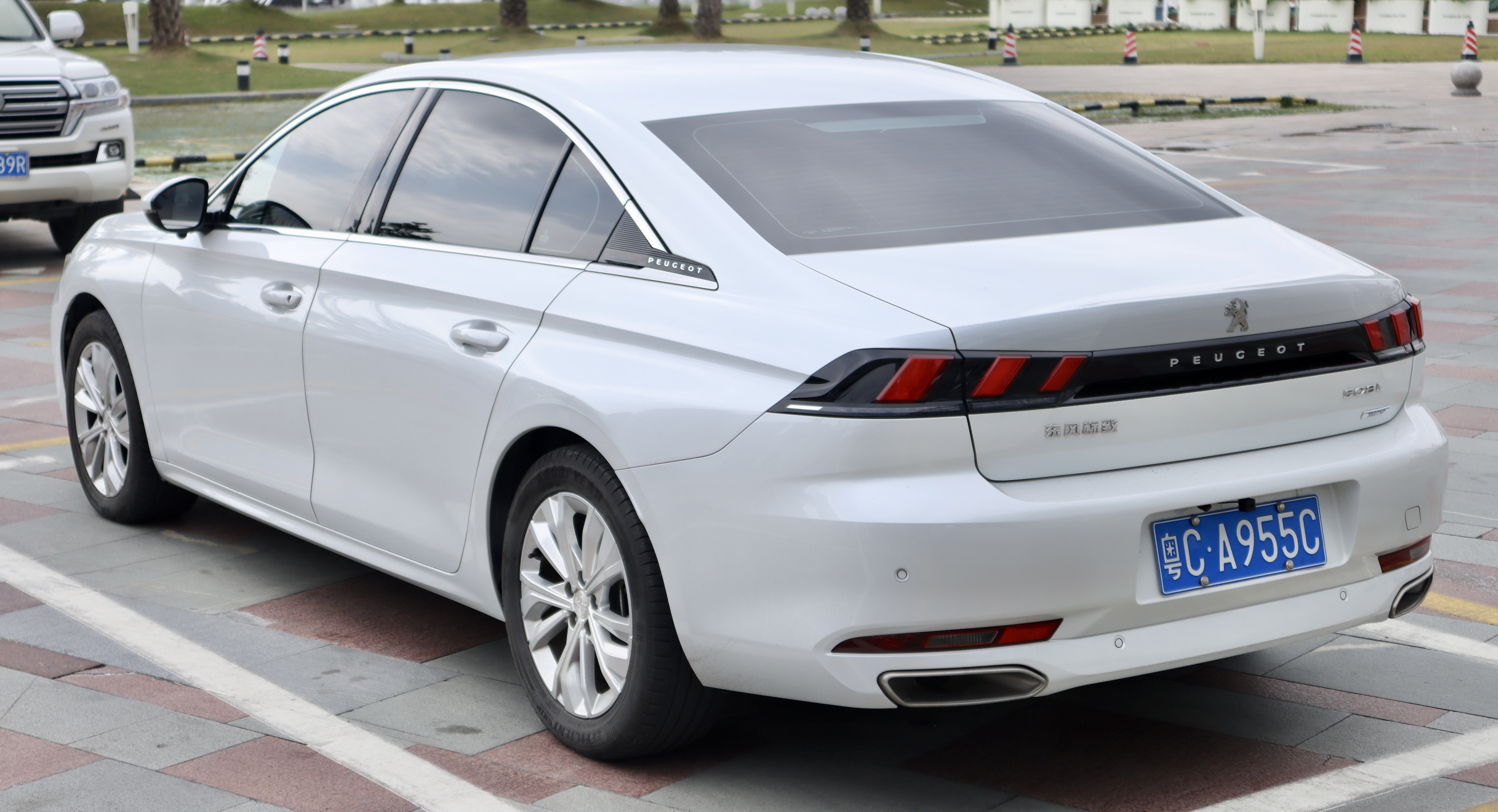
508L (rear view)

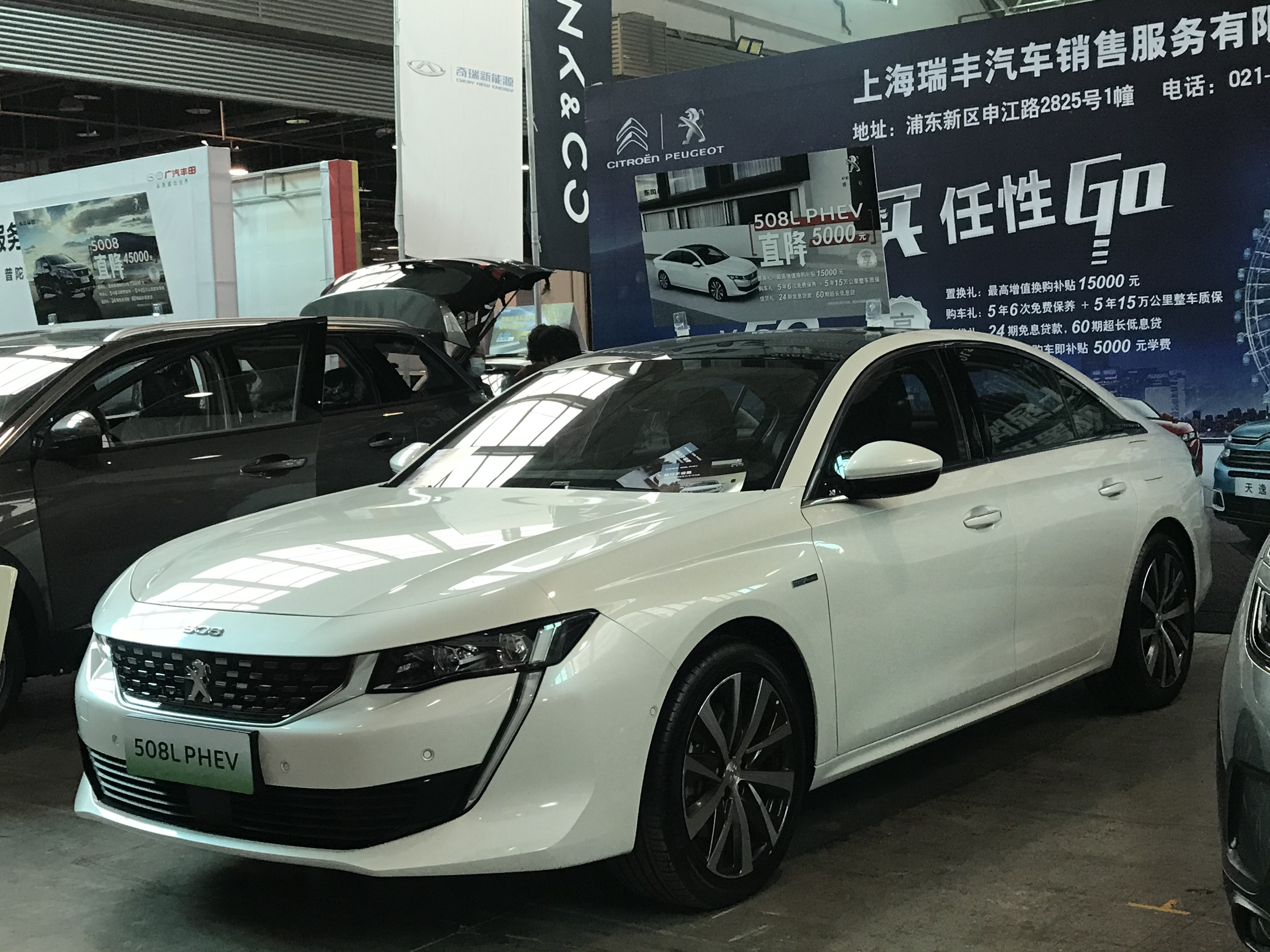
Pre-facelift 508L PHEV

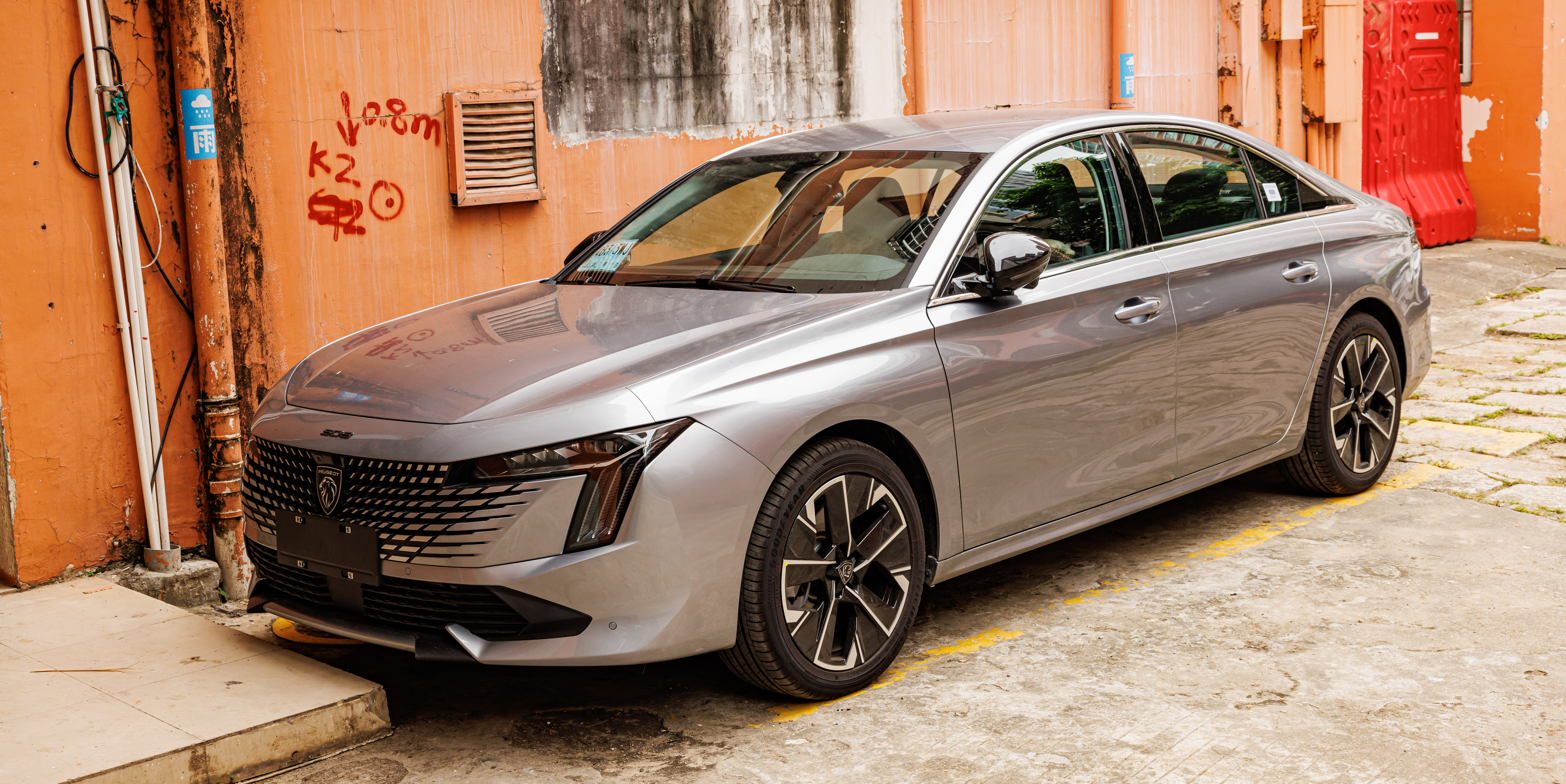
Facelift 508L (front view)

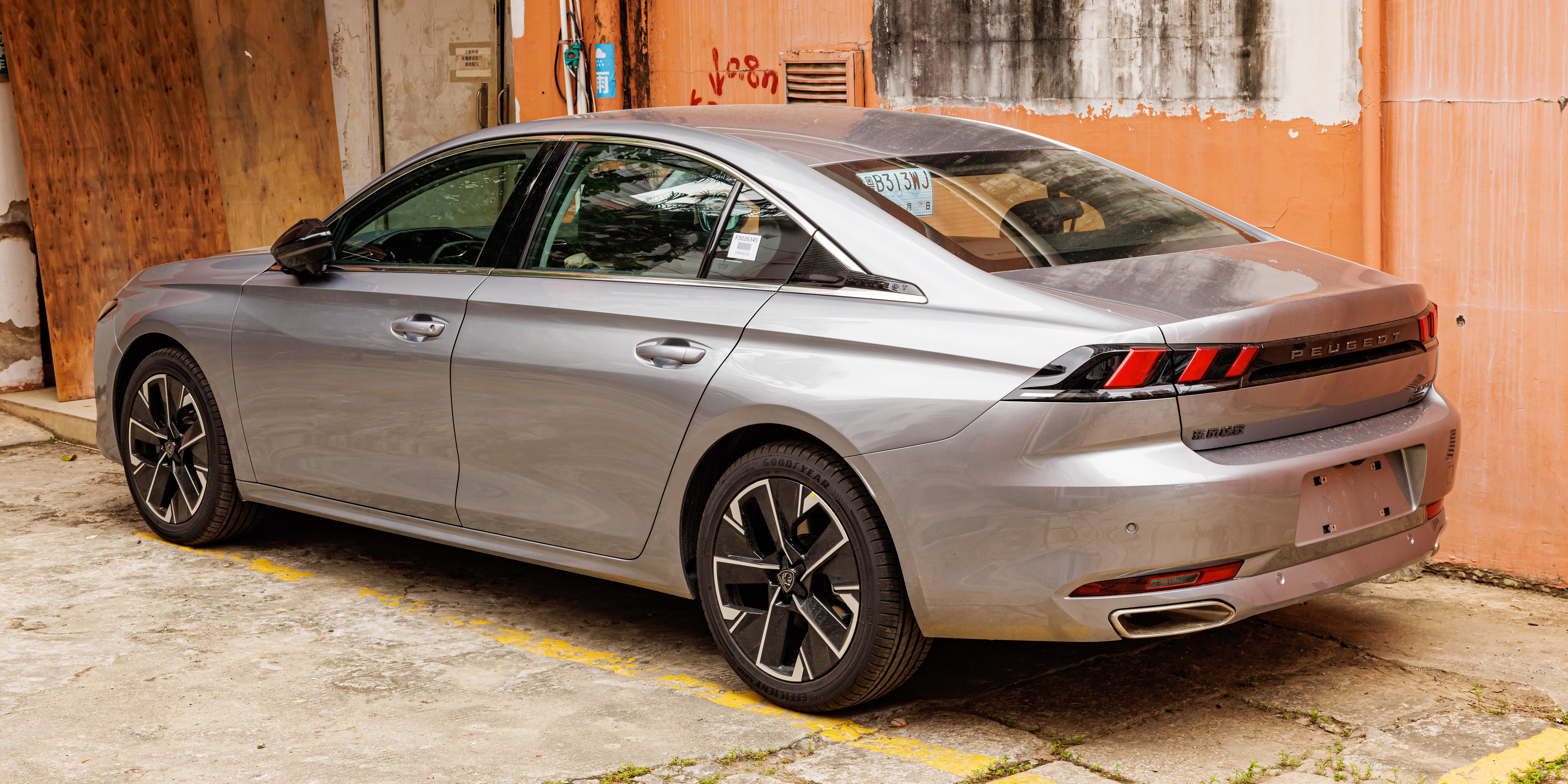
Facelift 508L (rear view)

=== Engines ===
Petrol engines
| Model | Type | Power, Torque at rpm | 0–100 km/h (0-62 mph) (s) | Top speed | Transmission | CO_{2} emission (g/km) | Years |
|---|---|---|---|---|---|---|---|
| 1.2 PureTech (130PS) | 1,199 cc (73.2 cu in) I3 | 130 PS (96 kW; 128 hp) at 5500, 230 N⋅m (170 lb⋅ft) at 1750 | 10 | 204 km/h (127 mph) | 8 speed EAT8 | 133 | 2021–2025 |
| 1.6 PureTech (182PS) | 1,598 cc (97.5 cu in) I4 | 180 PS (132 kW; 178 hp) at 5500, 250 N⋅m (184 lb⋅ft) at 1650 | 7.9 | 229 km/h (142 mph) | 8 speed EAT8 | 123–131 | 2018–2021 |
| 1.6 PureTech (225PS) | 1,598 cc (97.5 cu in) I4 | 225 PS (165 kW; 222 hp) at 5500, 300 N⋅m (221 lb⋅ft) at 1900 | 7.3 | 250 km/h (155 mph) | 8 speed EAT8 | 130–132 | 2018–2021 |

Petrol PHEV engines
| Model | Type | Power, Torque at rpm | 0–100 km/h (0-62 mph) (s) | Top speed | Transmission | CO_{2} emission (g/km) | Years |
|---|---|---|---|---|---|---|---|
| 1.6 PureTech EP6FDT (180PS) | 1,598 cc (97.5 cu in) I4 + 1 electric motor | 180 PS (132 kW; 178 hp) at 5500, 250 N⋅m (184 lb⋅ft) at 1650 | 7.9 | 229 km/h (142 mph) | 8 speed EAT8 | 123–127 | 2019–2025 |
| 1.6 PSE EP6FDT (360 PS) | 1,598 cc (97.5 cu in) I4 + 2 electric motors (1 front, 1 rear) | 360 PS (265 kW; 355 hp) at 5500, 520 N⋅m (384 lb⋅ft) at 1650 | 5.2 | 255 km/h (158 mph) | 8 speed EAT8 | ??? | 2021–2025 |

Diesel engines
| Model | Type | Power, Torque at rpm | 0–100 km/h (0-62 mph) (s) | Top speed | Transmission | CO_{2} emission (g/km) | Years |
|---|---|---|---|---|---|---|---|
| 1.5 BlueHDI (130PS) | 1,499 cc (91.5 cu in) I4 | 130 PS (96 kW; 128 hp) at 3750, 300 N⋅m (221 lb⋅ft) at 1750 | 9.7 | 208 km/h (129 mph) (Electrically limited) | 6 speed manual | 101 | 2018–2020 |
| 1.5 BlueHDI (130PS) | 1,499 cc (91.5 cu in) I4 | 130 PS (96 kW; 128 hp) at 3750, 300 N⋅m (221 lb⋅ft) at 1750 | 10 | 208 km/h (129 mph) (Electrically limited) | 8 speed EAT8 | 98 | 2018–2024 |
| 2.0 BlueHDI (160PS) | 1,997 cc (121.9 cu in) I4 | 160 PS (118 kW; 158 hp) at 3750, 400 N⋅m (295 lb⋅ft) at 2000 | 8.4 | 230 km/h (143 mph) | 8 speed EAT8 | 118–122 | 2018–2020 |
| 2.0 BlueHDI (180PS) | 1,997 cc (121.9 cu in) I4 | 180 PS (132 kW; 178 hp) at 3750, 400 N⋅m (295 lb⋅ft) at 2000 | 8.3 | 235 km/h (146 mph) | 8 speed EAT8 | 124–125 | 2018–2020 |

=== Safety ===
ANCAP test results* Peugeot 308 all variants (2018, aligned with Euro NCAP)
| Test | Points | % |
|---|---|---|
| Overall: | 5 /5 stars | |
| Adult occupant: | 36.5 | 96% |
| Child occupant: | 43 | 87% |
| Pedestrian: | 34.5 | 71% |
| Safety assist: | 9.9 | 76% |

From a system which rates to a maximum of five stars, the 508 received a five star rating by Euro NCAP in 2018. The score was:

Euro NCAP test results* Peugeot 508 (2018)
| Test | Points | % |
|---|---|---|
| Overall: | 5 /5 stars | |
| Adult occupant: | 36.5 | 96% |
| Child occupant: | 42.4 | 86% |
| Pedestrian: | 34.5 | 71% |
| Safety assist: | 10.3 | 79% |

=== Driving features ===
The Peugeot 508 includes various features.

The safety kit includes automatic emergency braking, adaptive cruise control, active blind spot detection including some steering correction to avoid an accident, speed and road sign recognition, automatic headlight beam selection and some driver-attention monitoring systems.

A windscreen camera is used to provide the features such as Active Lane Keeping Assistance and Road Edge Detection, speed sign recognition and Lane Positioning Assist, which can keep the car in the centre of the lane.

The 508's Safety Plus Pack has sensors to watch areas out of the field of vision, to warn the driver by a LED.

The car has also parking aids, ranging from front and rear sensors up to fully automated assistance for both parallel and car park spaces.

=== 508 PSE ===
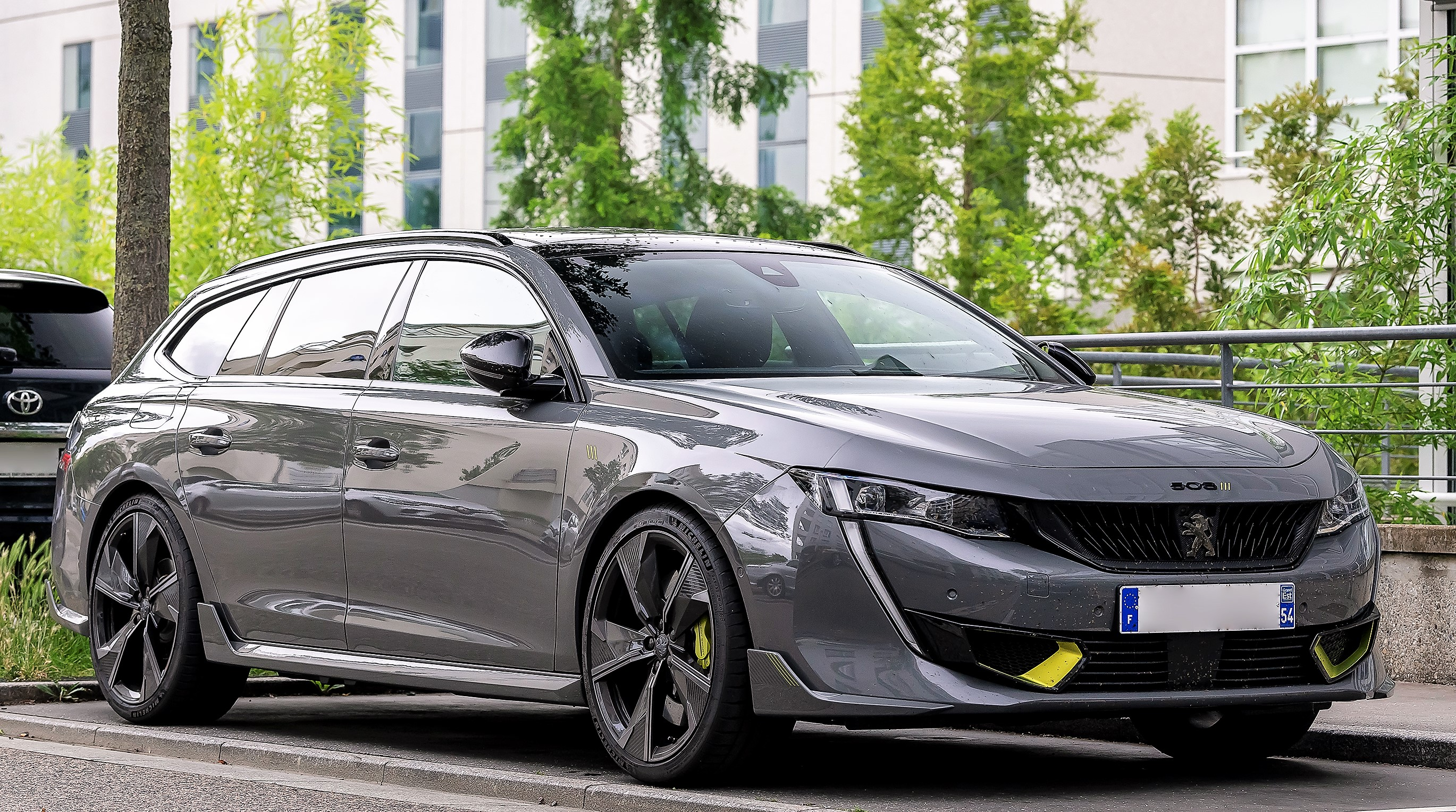
Pre-facelift Peugeot 508 II SW Peugeot Sport Engineered

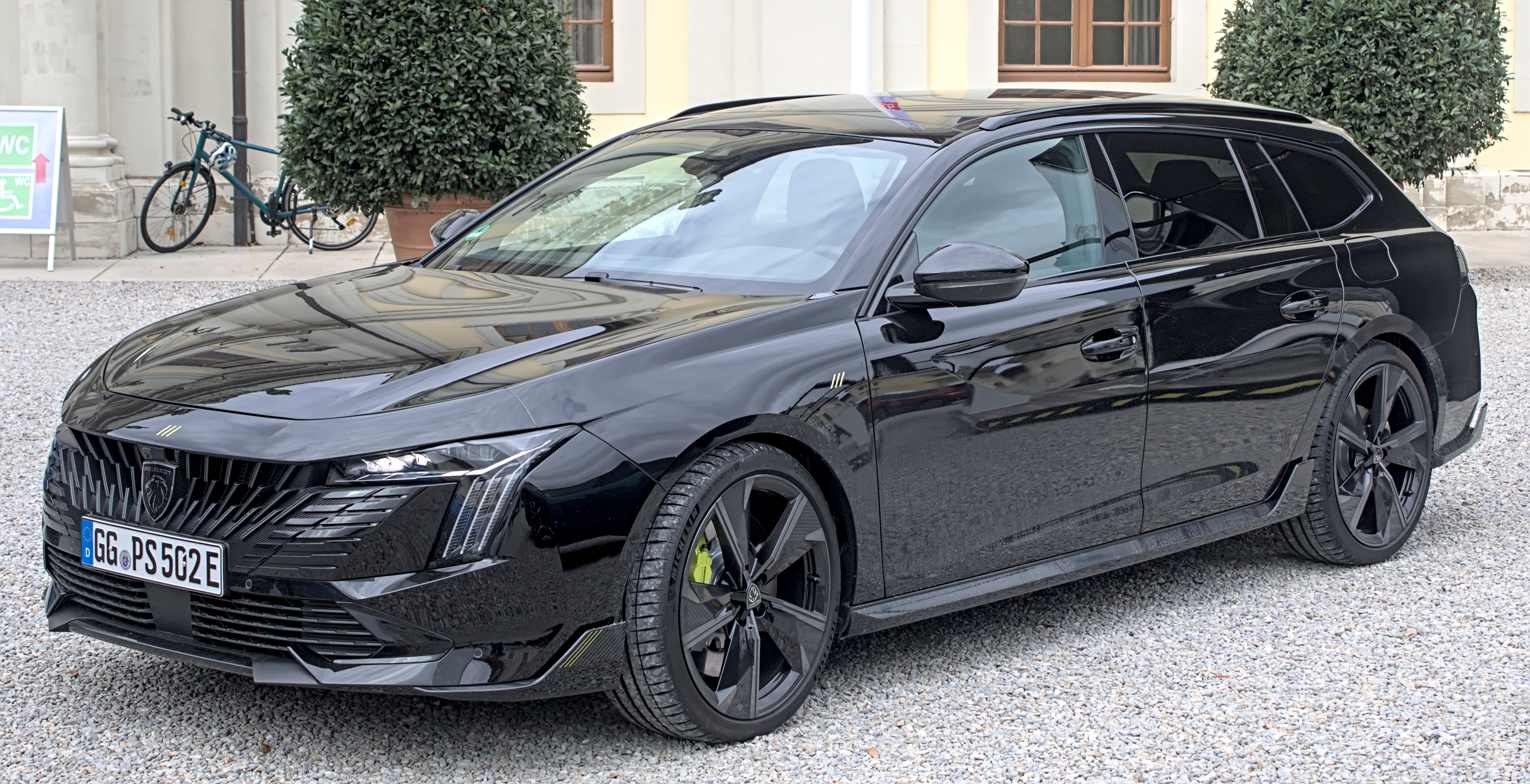
Post-facelift Peugeot 508 II SW Peugeot Sport Engineered

In February 2020, Peugeot unveiled the 508 PSE (Peugeot Sport Engineered), available both in liftback and estate body styles.

The 508 PSE sales has been way under Peugeot sales target (5 to 6% of the 508 total sales). As of April 2022, only 2,000 units had been manufactured. In February 2023, the pre-facelift 508 PSE was discontinued.

==== 508 Sport Engineered Concept ====
Unveiled in February 2019, and officially presented at the 2019 Geneva Motor Show, this concept is a sporty plug in hybrid version of the 508.

The maximum combined output of 400 PS (294 kW; 395 hp) and 500 N⋅m (369 lbf⋅ft) of torque is attained, thanks to a 200 PS (147 kW; 197 hp) petrol engine and 110 PS (81 kW; 108 hp) electric motor at the front, and a 200 PS (147 kW; 197 hp) electric motor on the rear axle (although the sum of the power numbers of each engine/motor sum to around 500 hp, the hybrid system cannot provide peak power for all three systems at once so maximum real world power output is lower at around 400 hp).

0 to 100 km/h (62 mph) is accomplished in 4.3 seconds, with an electronically limited top speed of 250 km/h (155 mph). Its 11.8 kWh battery allows this 508 to travel up to 50 km (31 mi) on electricity alone. Its CO_{2} emissions are 49 g/km per the WLTP test cycle. It also gets a sportier bodykit to improve aerodynamics. This concept was used as base for the 508 PSE production model that became available, both as a saloon and an estate, in the second half of 2020.

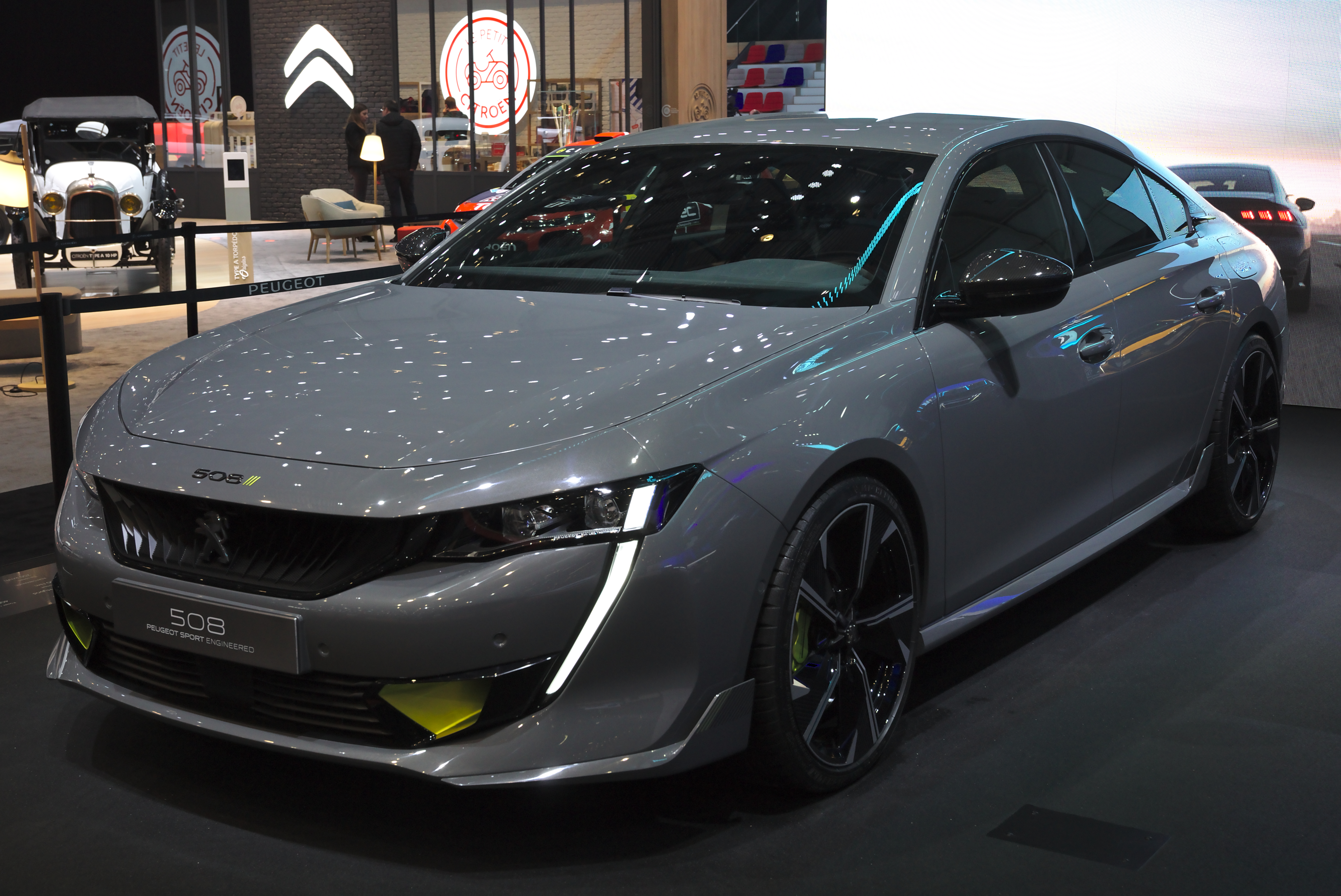
Peugeot 508 Sport Engineered Concept

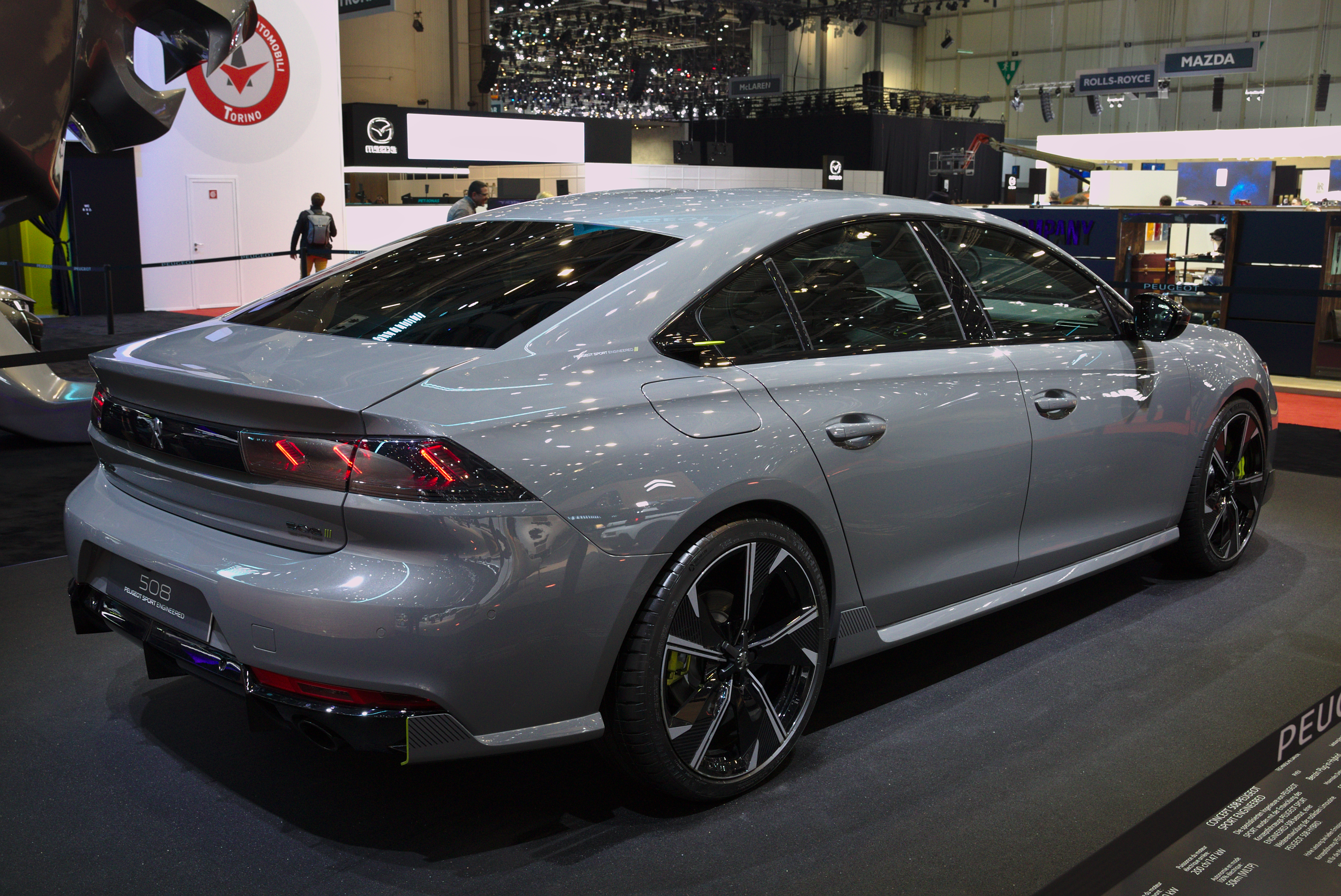
Rear view

== Sales and production ==
| Year | Worldwide Production | Worldwide sales | Notes |
| 2010 | 6,400 | 1,400 | |
| 2011 | 131,658 | 124,150 | Total 508 production reached 138,043 units. |
| 2012 | 116,400 | 124,150 | Total 508 production reached 121,700 units. |

508L
| Year | China |
|---|---|
| 2023 | 5,118 |
| 2024 | 3,519 |
| 2025 | 2,449 |
