= 508th =

508th may refer to:

- 508th Aerospace Sustainment Wing (508 ASW) is a wing of the United States Air Force based out of Hill Air Force Base, Utah
- 508th Air Refueling Squadron (508 ARS) was an aerial refueling unit that operated the Boeing KB-29 at Turner AFB, Georgia
- 508th Fighter Squadron, inactive United States Air Force unit
- 508th Fighter Wing, United States Air Force Reserve unit active with Tenth Air Force, based at Hill Air Force Base, Utah
- 508th Heavy Panzer Battalion, heavy tank battalion of the German Army during World War II, equipped with Tiger I heavy tanks
- 508th Infantry Regiment (United States), an airborne forces regiment of the US Army
- 508th Missile Squadron (508 MS), missile unit located at Whiteman AFB, Missouri

== See also ==
- 508 (number)
- 508, the year 508 (DVIII) of the Julian calendar
- 508 BC
