= 508 BC =

508 BC in various calendars
- Gregorian calendar: 508 BC; DVIII BC
- Ab urbe condita: 246
- Ancient Egypt era: XXVII dynasty, 18
- Pharaoh: Darius I of Persia, 14
- Ancient Greek Olympiad (summer): 68th Olympiad (victor)¹
- Assyrian calendar: 4243
- Balinese saka calendar: N/A
- Bengali calendar: −1101 – −1100
- Berber calendar: 443
- Buddhist calendar: 37
- Burmese calendar: −1145
- Byzantine calendar: 5001–5002
- Chinese calendar: 壬辰年 (Water Dragon); 2190 or 1983 — to — 癸巳年 (Water Snake); 2191 or 1984
- Coptic calendar: −791 – −790
- Discordian calendar: 659
- Ethiopian calendar: −515 – −514
- Hebrew calendar: 3253–3254
- Hindu calendars
- Vikram Samvat: −451 – −450
- Shaka Samvat: N/A
- Kali Yuga: 2593–2594
- Holocene calendar: 9493
- Iranian calendar: 1129 BP – 1128 BP
- Islamic calendar: 1164 BH – 1163 BH
- Javanese calendar: N/A
- Julian calendar: N/A
- Korean calendar: 1826
- Minguo calendar: 2419 before ROC 民前2419年
- Nanakshahi calendar: −1975
- Thai solar calendar: 35–36
- Tibetan calendar: ཆུ་ཕོ་འབྲུག་ལོ་ (male Water-Dragon) −381 or −762 or −1534 — to — ཆུ་མོ་སྦྲུལ་ལོ་ (female Water-Snake) −380 or −761 or −1533

The year 508 BC was a year of the pre-Julian Roman calendar. In the Roman Empire it was known as the Year of the Consulship of Poplicola and Tricipitinus (or, less frequently, year 246 Ab urbe condita). The denomination 508 BC for this year has been used since the early medieval period, when the Anno Domini calendar era became the prevalent method in Europe for naming years.

== Greece ==
- Athenian democracy in the city of Athens is established under Cleisthenes following the tyranny of Hippias.

== Italy ==
- A war is fought between Rome and Clusium.
- Clusium fights a war with Aricia.
- The office of pontifex maximus is created in Rome.
