= 540s BC =

Decade

This article concerns the period 549 BC – 540 BC.

== Events and trends ==
- 546 BC—Croesus, Lydian king, is defeated by Cyrus of Persia near the River Halys.
- 546 BC—Cyrus of Persia completes his conquest of Lydia, and makes Pasargadae his capital.
- 546 BC—Cyrus establishes a garrison in Sardis and incorporates the Greek cities of Ionia in Asia Minor into Persian Empire. Thus he gains the important ports that look out to the Mediterranean world.
- 546 BC—Pisistratus, supported by Thebes and Argos, finally takes power in Athens from the aristocratic party and imposes a moderate tyranny, respect, and even imposing against the oligarchy, the laws of Solon and leaving intact the magistracy (he "merely" to save his family). The same year Pisistratus cut taxes, grants of land and resources to the poor and caters for sick and old. It unifies the Attica, extending the influence of Athens, resuming Sigeion, who commanded the entrance of the Hellespont (Dardanelles), and acquires Taurica (Crimea).
- 546 BC—Sparta and Argos fight the Battle of the 300 Champions. Both sides had agreed beforehand to resolve their dispute with just 300 picked men on each side, in the end just one Spartan and two Argive soldiers remained alive. Both sides claimed victory.
- 546 BC—The architect Eupalinos of Megara built aqueducts that supply water to Athens.
- 546 BC—The peace conference between the kingdoms in China. A treaty between Jin, Chu and some other kingdoms was signed.
- 546 BC—A coup d'état in Qi kingdom.
- 544 BC—People of Teos migrate to Abdera, Thrace to escape the control of Persia.
- 544 BC—King Jing becomes king of the Zhou dynasty of China.
- 543 BC—North Indian Prince Vijaya invades Ceylon and establishes a Sri Lankan dynasty.
- 543 BC—Pisistratus, tyrant of Athens, purifies the island of Delos (approximate date).
- 543 BC—Guided by the Chinese statesman Zi Chan, the State of Zheng institutes a formal code of law.
- 540 BC—Cyrus attacks Babylonia.
- 540 BC—Greek city of Elea of southern Italy founded (approximate date).
- 540 BC—Persians conquer Lycian city of Xanthos now in southern Turkey (approximate date).
- c. 540 BC—Amasis Painter makes Dionysos with maenads, black-figure decoration on an amphora. It is now at Bibliotheque Nationale de France, Paris.
- c. 540 BC—Exekias makes The Suicide of Ajax, black-figure decoration on an amphora. It is now at Chateau-Musee, Boulogne-sur-Mer, France.

== Significant people ==
- 549 BC—Birth of Darius I
- 547 BC—Death of Croesus?
- 546 BC—Death of Anaximander, Greek philosopher (approximate date)
- 545 BC—Death of Zhou ling wang, king of the Zhou dynasty of China
- 544 BC—Birth of Sun Tzu
- 543 BC—Death of Gautama Buddha (traditional in Thailand and elsewhere—basis of the Thai solar calendar)
- 543 BC—Death of Thales, Greek philosopher
- 540 BC—Amyntas I becomes king of Macedonia (approximate date)
- Amasis Painter, Greek painter
