= 547 BC =

547 BC in various calendars
- Gregorian calendar: 547 BC; DXLVII BC
- Ab urbe condita: 207
- Ancient Egypt era: XXVI dynasty, 118
- Pharaoh: Amasis II, 24
- Ancient Greek Olympiad (summer): 58th Olympiad, year 2
- Assyrian calendar: 4204
- Balinese saka calendar: N/A
- Bengali calendar: −1140 – −1139
- Berber calendar: 404
- Buddhist calendar: −2
- Burmese calendar: −1184
- Byzantine calendar: 4962–4963
- Chinese calendar: 癸丑年 (Water Ox); 2151 or 1944 — to — 甲寅年 (Wood Tiger); 2152 or 1945
- Coptic calendar: −830 – −829
- Discordian calendar: 620
- Ethiopian calendar: −554 – −553
- Hebrew calendar: 3214–3215
- Hindu calendars
- Vikram Samvat: −490 – −489
- Shaka Samvat: N/A
- Kali Yuga: 2554–2555
- Holocene calendar: 9454
- Iranian calendar: 1168 BP – 1167 BP
- Islamic calendar: 1204 BH – 1203 BH
- Javanese calendar: N/A
- Julian calendar: N/A
- Korean calendar: 1787
- Minguo calendar: 2458 before ROC 民前2458年
- Nanakshahi calendar: −2014
- Thai solar calendar: −4 – −3
- Tibetan calendar: ཆུ་མོ་གླང་ལོ་ (female Water-Ox) −420 or −801 or −1573 — to — ཤིང་ཕོ་སྟག་ལོ་ (male Wood-Tiger) −419 or −800 or −1572

The year 547 BC was a year of the pre-Julian Roman calendar. In the Roman Empire, it was known as year 207 Ab urbe condita. The denomination 547 BC for this year has been used since the early medieval period, when the Anno Domini calendar era became the prevalent method in Europe for naming years.

== Events ==
- Croesus seizes the Persian city of Pteria and enslaves its inhabitants. Meanwhile, Cyrus invites the Ionians to join him in battle.
- The Battles of Thymbra and Pteria are fought between Croesus of Lydia and Cyrus the Great.
- Cyrus besieges and captures Sardis.

== Deaths ==
- Anaximander (some sources also give 545 BC or 546 BC)
- Thales of Miletus
- Croesus
