= Sala (Lydia) =

Suppressed, vacant and titular see of the Roman Catholic Church

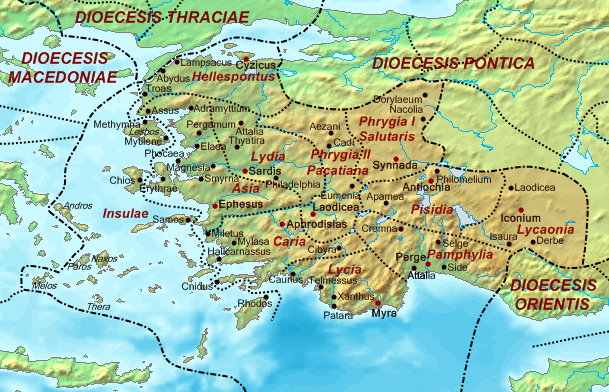
Asia minor 400AD

Sala or Salena was a town of ancient Lydia, and is a suppressed, vacant and titular see of the Roman Catholic Church.

== History ==
The town of Sala is identifiable with Kepecik in today's west Turkey, but in antiquity was an ancient episcopal see of the Roman province of Lydia in Asia Minor. It was part of the Patriarchate of Constantinople during Byzantine times and was suffragan of the Archdiocese of Sardis.

Sala is not mentioned by Michel Le Quien in his work Oriens Christianus but a bishop Stephen is recorded in the episcopal lists of the second Second Council of Nicaea. William Mitchell Ramsay in his The Historical Geography of Asia Minor (1890) claims that Le Quien's omission of Sala was due to his misreading the Greek records where he "invented" the bishopric of Helenopolis.

Sala survives today as a titular bishop; the seat has been vacant since 27 January 1962.

== Known bishops ==
=== Ancient bishops ===
- Noumenius
- Anatolius fl458
- Stephen fl787

=== Titular Catholic bishops ===
- Floyd Begin Lawrence (03.22.1947 – 01.27.1962)
- Edward Quentin Jennings (03/22/1941 – 22/02/1946)
- Philippe-Servulo Desranleau (later Archbishop) (12/13/1937 – 02/12/1941)
- Augustine Francis Schinner (17/12/1925 – 02/07/1937)
