= Helenopolis =

Helenopolis (Greek: Ἑλενόπολις) may refer to:

- Helenopolis (Bithynia), ancient city in Asia Minor, modern Turkey
- Helenopolis (Palestine), ancient city in Palestine
- Helenopolis (Lydia), possibly an ancient city in Lydia

== See also ==
- Hellenopolis, an ancient city in Anatolia
