= 546 (disambiguation) =

546 may refer to:

- the year 546 AD
- the year 546 BC

Any of the following American roads:

- KY 546, a former state highway in Kentucky
- LA 546, a state highway in Louisiana
- Route 546, a state highway in Maryland
- CR546, a county route in the state of New Jersey
- Erie County Route 546, a county route in the state of New York
- Route 546, a state highway in Ohio
- Route 546, a state highway in Pennsylvania
- Route 546, a state highway in Washington

Or, Secondary Highway 546 in the Algoma District of Ontario, Canada.
