= Thymbra =

Ancient town in the Troad

See Battle of Thymbra for the fight in Lydia between the Persians and the Lydians. See Thymbra (plant) for the plant genus.

Thymbra or Thymbre (Ancient Greek: Θύμβρα or Θύμβρη) was a town in the Troad, near Troy. The second of the six gates of Troy was named after it, according to John Lydgate. The location is about five miles from present day Hissarlik, the site of the present archaeological excavations.

The town was located on the plain by the same name (reported in modern times in the Turkish language as Thimbrek-Déré by Chateaubriand) formed by the river Thymbrios (Latin: Thymbrium), today known as the Kemer River, at the confluence of the Thymbrios and the Scamander. According to Strabo, "The plain of Thymbra . . . and the Thymbrios River, which flows through the plain and empties into the River Skamandros at the temple of Apollon Thymbraios." Also according to Strabo, the distance from Ilium, the town erected by the Romans on the old site of Troy, to the temple was about 50 stadia.

Thymbra was also the location of a major temple and sanctuary of Apollo (one of his epithets is Lord of Delphi and Thymbra). The god was known there as Apollo Thymbraios, a localizing epithet. In Greek mythology, the temple is tied to the fall of Troy as the location of Achilles' murder of Troilus upon that god's altar, as well as the place where Cassandra received her prophetic powers. It is also the place where Laocoön and his sons were torn to pieces by the snake. It has been hypothesized that the two deaths within the sacred precinct point to an ancient sacrificial practice. Finally, there is one version, by Dictys Cretensis in which Achilles himself dies at Thymbra, ambushed by Paris, who draws him there promising Polyxena as wife in exchange for his defection to the Trojans.

The valley of the Thymbrios had as one of its main features the hill of Callicolone (Καλλικολώνη). The city disappeared probably before the 4th century BCE.
