= Cerasa =

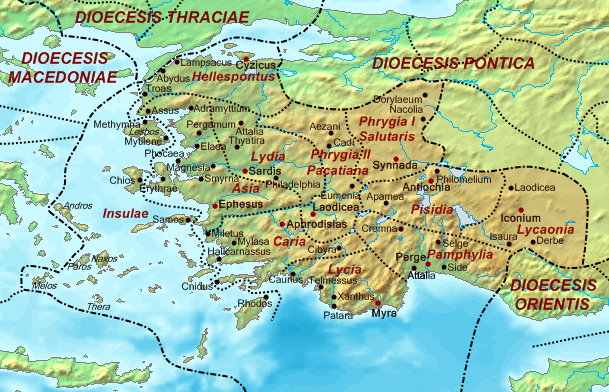
Asia minor 400AD

Cerasa is a titular see of the Roman Catholic Church.

== History ==
It goes back a former diocese in the Roman province of Asia and Lydia in western Turkey. It belonged to the ecclesiastical province of Sardis.

Cerasa, identifiable with Eliesler in modern Turkey, is an ancient episcopal see of the Roman province of Lydia in the civil Diocese of Asia. It was part of the Patriarchate of Constantinople and was suffragan of the Archdiocese of Sardis.

The lists of participants in the ecumenical councils have handed the names of four bishops of this ancient episcopal:

- Menecrates the Council of Chalcedon,
- John the Second Council of Constantinople,
- Michael the Second Council of Nicaea and
- Agathon at the Council of Constantinople dell'879- 880 that reinstated Patriarch Photios I of Constantinople.

Cerasa survives today as titular bishop but has been vacant since May 2, 2001.

== See also ==
- Catholic Church in Turkey
