= Digda =

Historical town in Turkey

Coordinates: 38°06′22″N 28°01′15″E

Digda was a town, in what is now the Aegean Region of Turkey, during the Iron Age. The name is a Lydian word of unknown significance. This took on the Turkish form Adagide, which remained the name of the town until quite recently, when the name was officially changed to Ovakent.

Digda is situated in İzmir Province, about 14 km east of Tire and 12 km south of Ödemiş, and can be reached from either of these two centres. It is situated on the north slope of the mountain range surrounding the southern section of the valley of the Küçük Menderes at a point where the hills descended to the plain. The remoteness of the site has resulted in its remaining completely undeveloped.
