= Battle of Thymbra =

6th-century BC battle between Lydian Kingdom and Achaemenid Empire

- Part of the Campaigns of Cyrus the Great
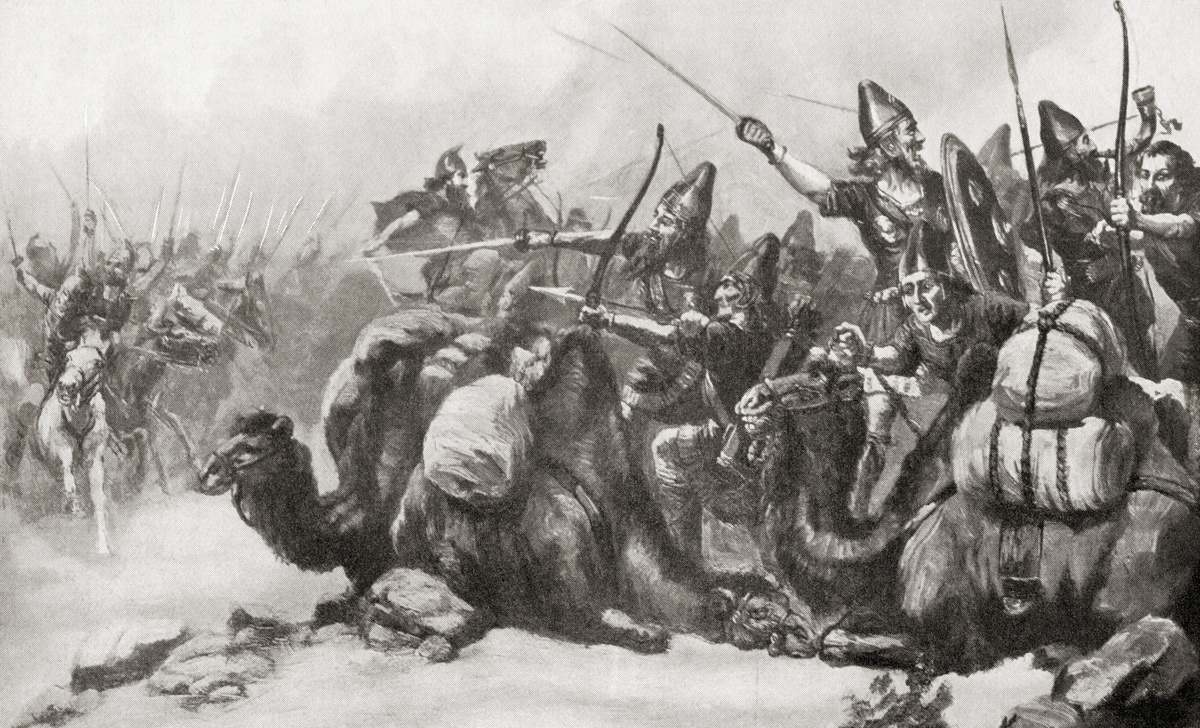
- Defeat of Croesus at the Battle of Thymbra, 546 BC
| Date | December, 547 BC |
| Location | Thymbra, Lydia (modern-day Manisa, Turkey) 38°40′00″N 27°50′00″E |
| Result | Persian victory |
| Territorial changes | Anatolia annexed by Persia |

Belligerents
| Lydia; Arabian, Babylonian and Egyptian mercenaries | Achaemenid Empire |

Commanders and leaders
| Kroisos; Aribaios; Artakamas; Aragdos; Gabaidos | Cyrus the Great; Harpagos; Abradatas |

Strength
| 260,000 in total (Xenophon): 140,000 soldiers (Note: Including Babylonians, Lydians, Phrygians, Cappadocians, and nations of the Hellespont); 100,000 Infantry; 40,000 Cavalry; 120,000 Egyptian Phalanx; 300 chariots; Modern Estimates: Over 100,000 | 196,000 in total (Xenophon): 31,000–70,000 Persians; 20,000 Infantry, archers and slingers; 10,000 Persian Immortals; 20,000 Peltasts; 20,000 Pikemen; 126,000 Infantry (Note: Including Arabians; Armenians; and Medians); 300 Camel cavalry; 700 chariots (300 engaged); 5-6 siege towers; Modern Estimates: 20,000–50,000 |
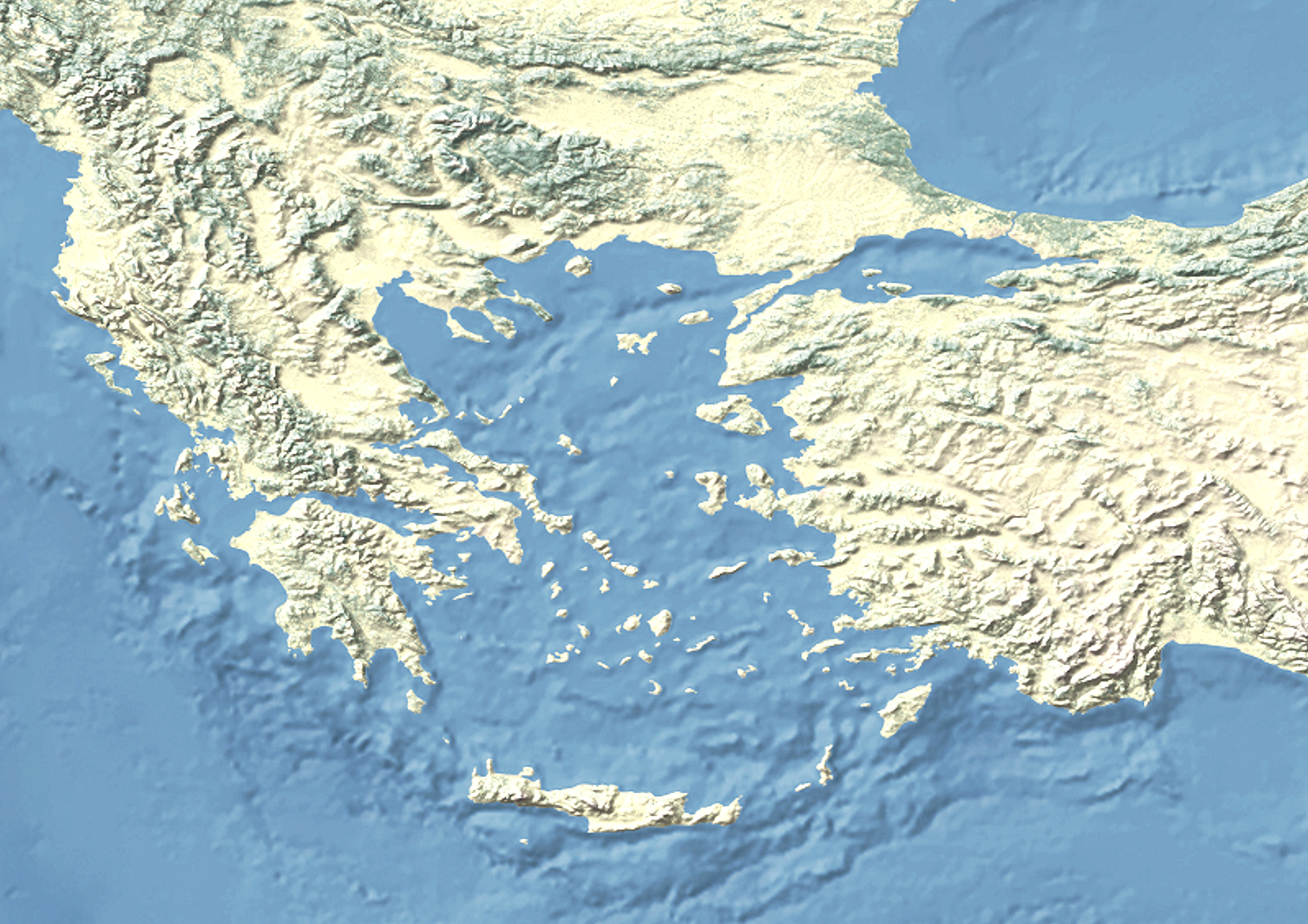
- Approximate location of the Battle of Thymbra

The Battle of Thymbra was the decisive battle in the war between Croesus of the Lydian Kingdom and Cyrus the Great of the Achaemenid Empire. Cyrus, after he had pursued Croesus into Lydia after the drawn Battle of Pteria, met the remnants of Croesus' partially disbanded army in battle on the plain north of Sardis in December 547 BC. Croesus' army was about twice as large and had been reinforced with many new men, but Cyrus still utterly defeated it. That proved to be decisive, and after the 14-day Siege of Sardis, the city and possibly its king fell, and Lydia was conquered by the Persians.

== Background ==
Cyrus conquered the Kingdom of Media in 550 BC, which created conflict with the neighboring Lydian Kingdom. Cyrus planned to catch the Lydian king unprepared for battle, but at Thymbra, Croesus had more than twice as many men as Cyrus. The Lydians marched out to meet Cyrus and quickly armed all the reserves there before their allies could arrive, which they never did. According to Xenophon, Cyrus had 196,000 men in total, which was composed of 31,000 to 70,000 Persians. That consisted of 20,000 infantry, which may have included archers and slingers; 10,000 elite infantry/ cavalry, which may have been the Persian Immortals; and 20,000 peltasts and 20,000 pikemen. All except the archers and slingers are known to have carried small to large shields. The others were 42,000 Arabians; Armenians; and Medians, which amounted to 126,000 infantry. There were also 300 camel cavalry, 300 chariots, and 5-6 siege towers, which were known to hold 20 men each. It all amounted to more than 1,000 men, partly because there was one citizen, and one soldier on each chariot.

Xenophon tells us that Croesus had an army of 420,000 men, which was composed of 60,000 Babylonians, Lydians, and Phrygians, also Cappadocians, plus nations of the Hellespont. This amounted to 300,000 men which included 60,000 cavalries. There were also 120,000 Egyptians, plus 300 chariots, which may have been at least 500 men. The numbers of the battle given by Xenophon, even if untrue, are considered within the realm of possibility, but less than half may have engaged in the actual battle.

== Battle ==
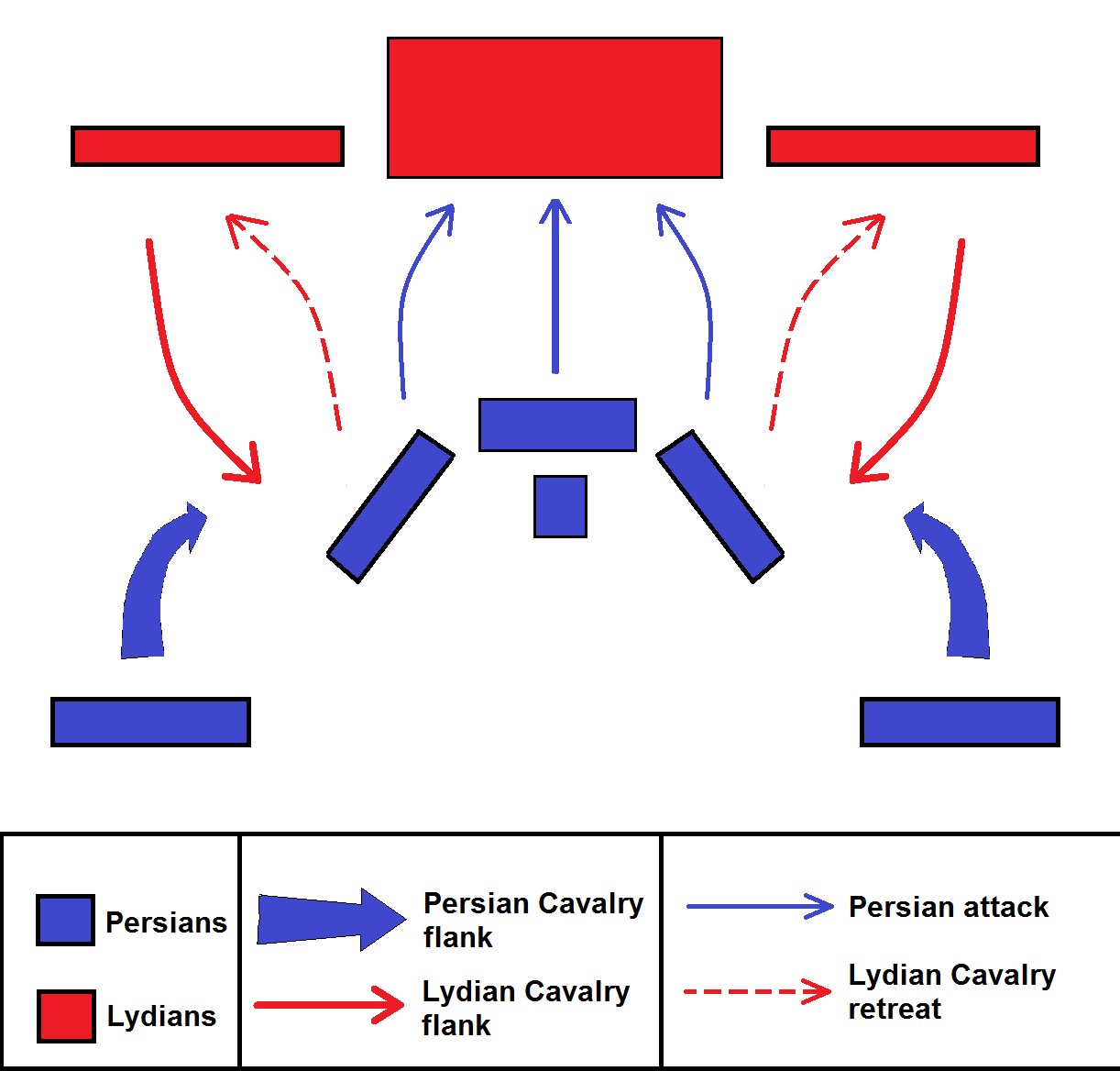
Strategies used in the battle

Cyrus deployed his troops with flanks withdrawn in a square formation. The flanks were covered by chariots, cavalry, and infantry. Cyrus also used baggage camels to create a barrier around his archers. The smell of the camels disrupted the Lydian horses and scattered their cavalry charge as the archers fired upon Lydian forces.

As Cyrus had expected, the wings of the Lydian army wheeled inward to envelop this novel formation. As the Lydian flanks swung in, gaps appeared at the hinges of the wheeling wings. The disorder was increased by the effective overhead fire of the Persian archers and mobile towers, stationed within the square. Cyrus then gave the order to attack, and his flank units smashed into Croesus' disorganized wings. Soon, the Lydian cavalry lost many soldiers and was forced to retreat. With most of Cyrus' army intact and the loss of most of the Lydian cavalry, Cyrus ordered all cavalry and infantry to attack what remained of Croesus' forces. Most of the infantry soon surrendered, but Croesus and a small part of the infantry retreated and headed for the Lydian capital of Sardis, which resulted in a decisive victory for the Persians.

Herodotus gives an account of the battle but does not give any numbers. His account of the battle's progress and outcome, however, confirms what Xenophon gives later.

== Aftermath ==
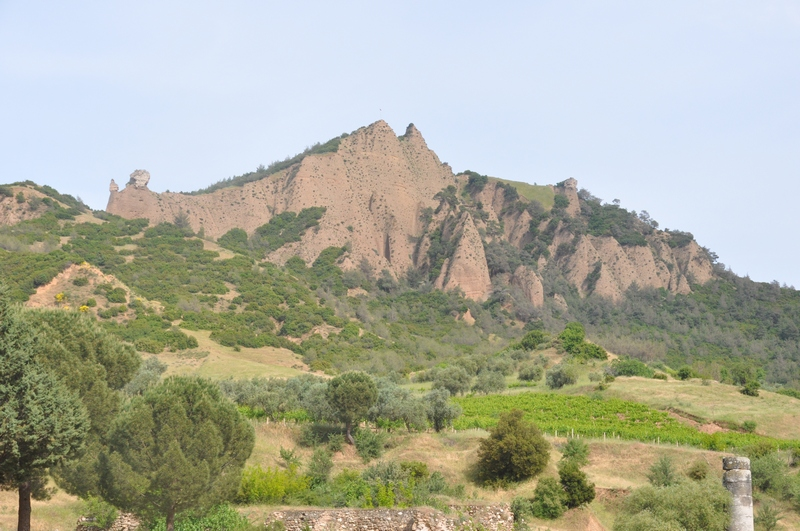
The Battle of Thymbra took place below the citadel of Sardis (center), and the Lydians then retreated for the Siege of Sardis (547 BC).

After the battle, the Lydians were driven within the walls of Sardis and put to siege by the victorious Cyrus. The city fell after the 14-day Siege of Sardis, reportedly by the Lydians' failure to garrison a part of the wall that they had thought to be unsusceptible to attack because of the steepness of the adjacent declivity of the ground. Croesus was captured, and his territory, including the Greek cities of Ionia and Aeolis, was incorporated into Cyrus' already-powerful empire.

That development brought Greece and Persia into conflict and culminated in the celebrated Persian wars of Cyrus' successors. Along with acquiring Ionia and Aeolis, Cyrus also had the Egyptian soldiers, who fought on behalf of the Lydians, voluntarily surrender and join his army.

According to the Greek author Herodotus, Cyrus treated Croesus well and with respect after the battle. The Babylonian Nabonidus Chronicle apparently contradicts that by reporting that Cyrus defeated and killed the king, but the identity of the Lydian king is unclear.

== See also ==
- Siege of Sardis (546 BC)

== Sources ==
- Davis, Paul K. (1999). 100 Decisive Battles: From Ancient Times to the Present, Santa Barbara, CA, USA:PUBLISHER, ISBN 1576070751, URL.
- Campbell, Alexander (1830). The Millennial Harbinger, Vol. I, No. IX.
- Grant, R.G. (2005). Battle: a Visual Journey Through 5000 Years of Combat, DK Publishing London, ISBN 9780756645014,
