= Siege of Sardis (547 BC) =

Battle between Persia and Lydia

- Part of the Campaigns of Cyrus the Great
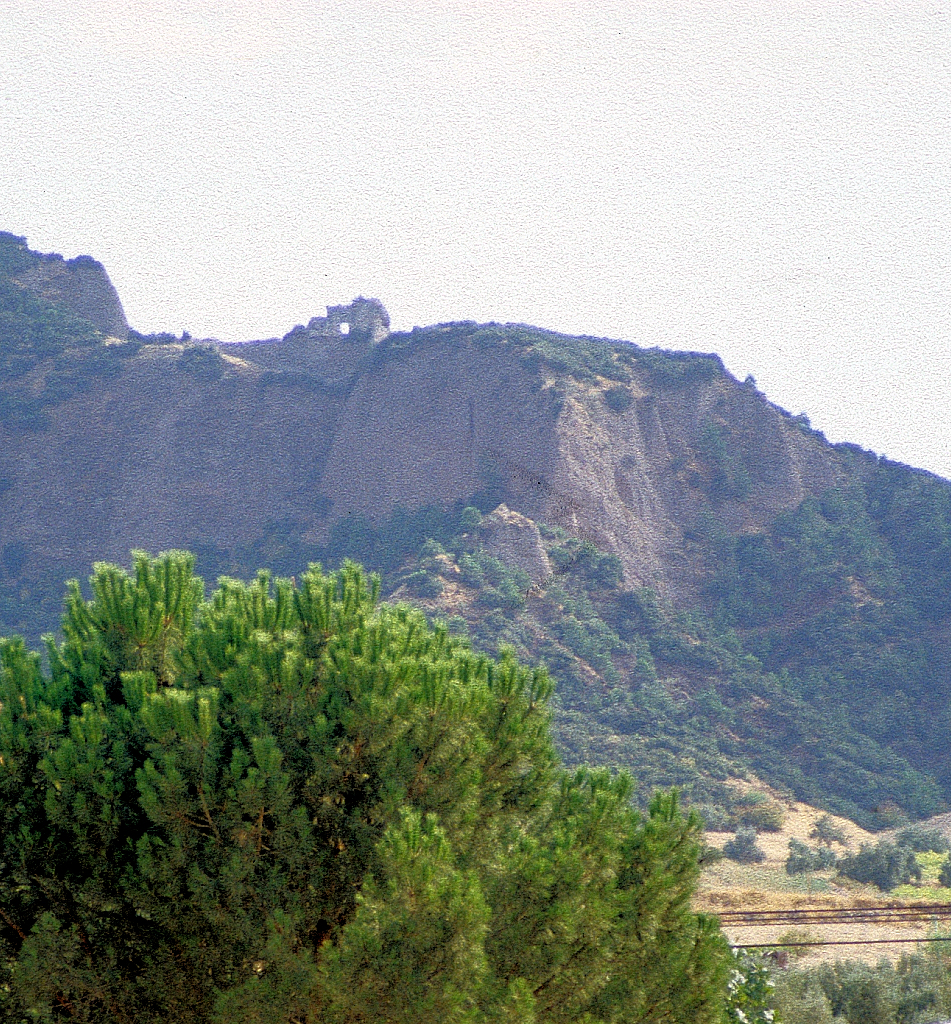
- Remains of the acropolis of Sardis, where Croesus was finally captured
| Date | December, 547 BC |
| Location | Sardis, Lydia (modern-day Sart, Manisa, Turkey) 38°29′00″N 28°02′00″E |
| Result | Persian victory |
| Territorial changes | Lydia annexed by Persia |

Belligerents
| Lydia | Achaemenid Empire |

Commanders and leaders
| Kroisos (POW) | Cyrus the Great; Harpagos |
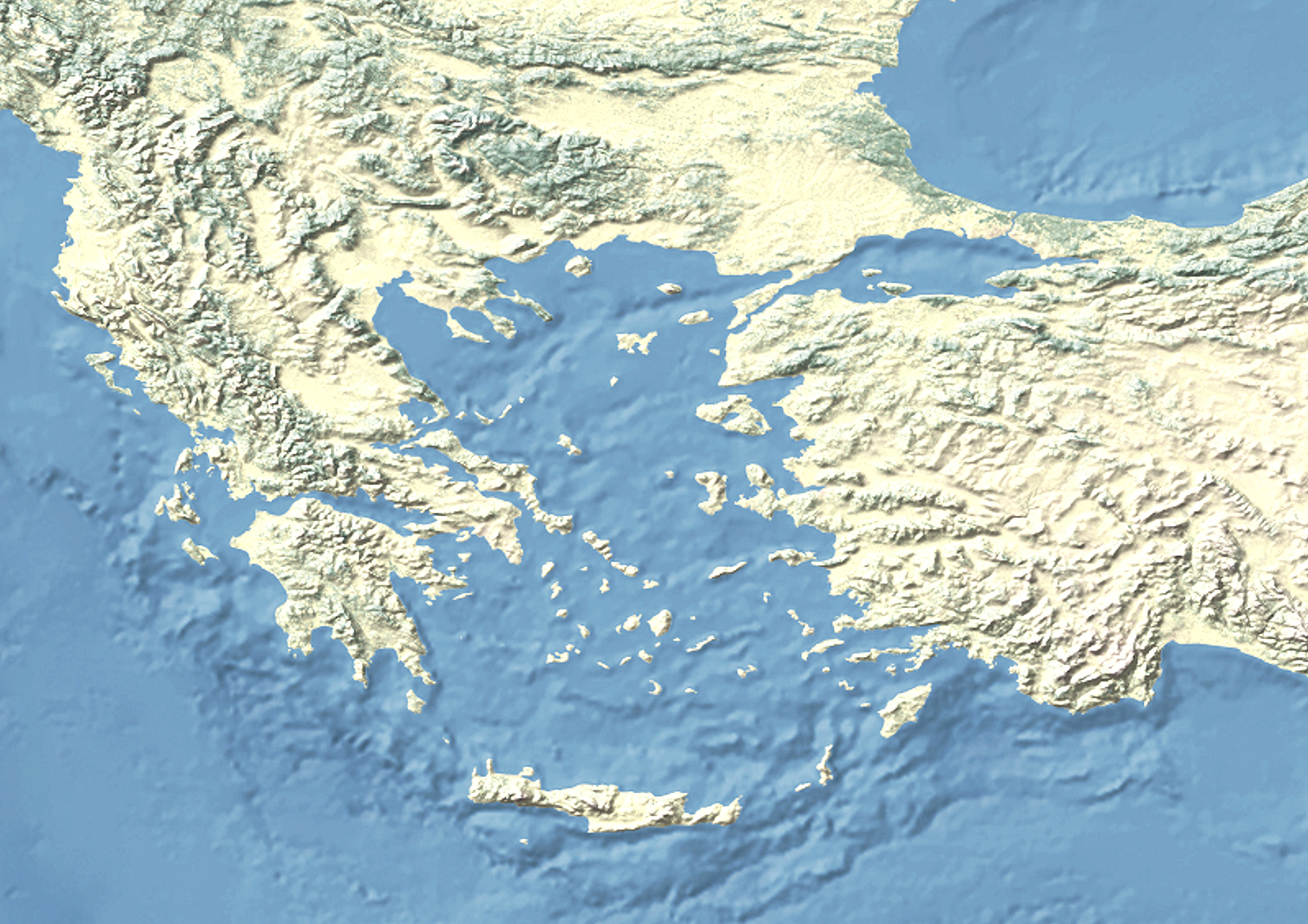
- Approximate location of the siege of Sardis

The Siege of Sardis (547/546 BC) was the last decisive conflict after the Battle of Thymbra, which was fought between the forces of Croesus of Lydia and Cyrus the Great. In the battle, Croesus was defeated and was forced to retreat to his capital at Sardis. Cyrus promptly followed Croesus to his city, laid siege to it for 14 days and captured it along with Croesus.

== Background ==
The previous year Croesus, the king of Lydia, impelled by various considerations, invaded the kingdom of Cyrus the Great. Croesus hoped to quell the growing power of Achaemenid Persia, expand his own dominions and revenge the deposition of his brother-in-law Astyages. Also, Croesus thought himself certain of success since he was deluded by the ambiguous assurances of the apparently-reliable oracle of Apollo at Delphi.

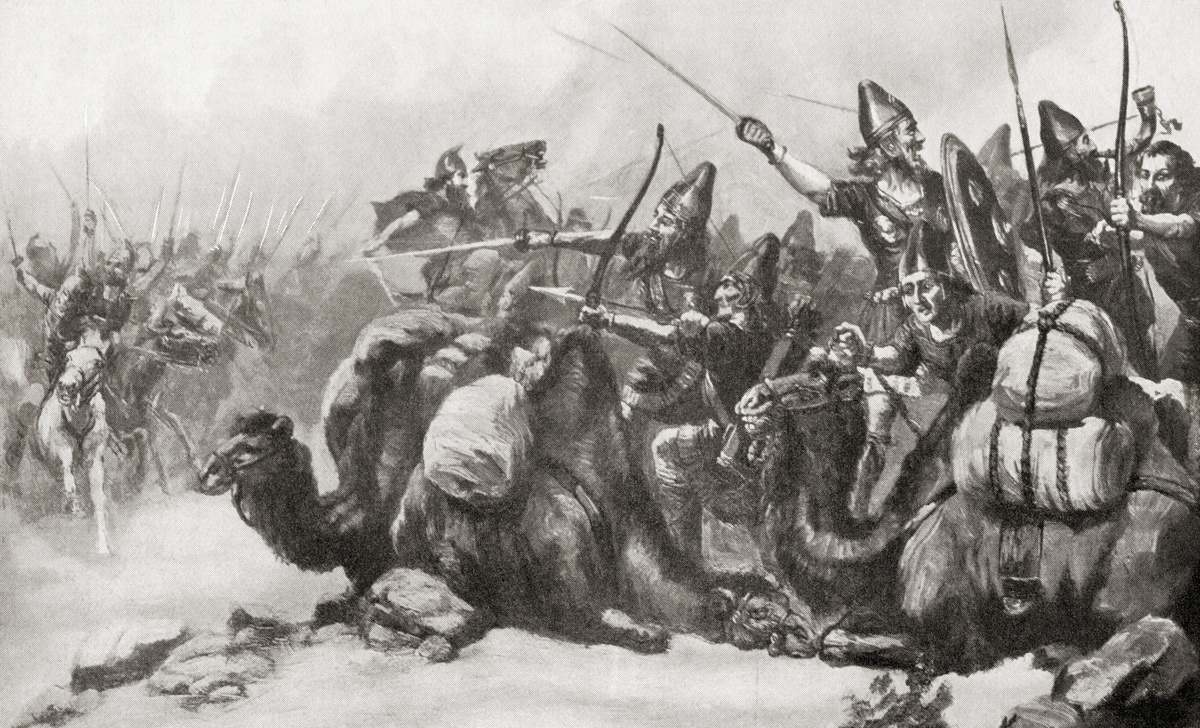
Defeat of Croesus at the Battle of Thymbra, 546 BC

Croesus crossed the Halys and met Cyrus at Pteria in Cappadocia, but after a drawn-out battle against superior forces in which neither side obtained the victory, Croesus resolved to fall back for the winter, summon new allies and renew the war with reinforcements the next spring. In the interim, he disbanded his army and returned to Sardis. He expected Cyrus to hang back after the sanguinary battle in Cappadocia, but the energetic Cyrus, as soon as he heard that Croesus's forces were dispersed, crossed the Halys and advanced with such speed that he had arrived at the Lydian capital, Sardis, before Croesus had any word of his approach.

Undaunted, Croesus mustered his available troops and met Cyrus at the Battle of Thymbra outside the walls. Cyrus was victorious and had contrived to deprive the Lydians of their last resource, their cavalry (in which they allegedly surpassed all other nations at the time) by frightening off their horses with the sight of his camels. The remnants of the Lydian army were driven within the city and promptly besieged.

== Siege ==
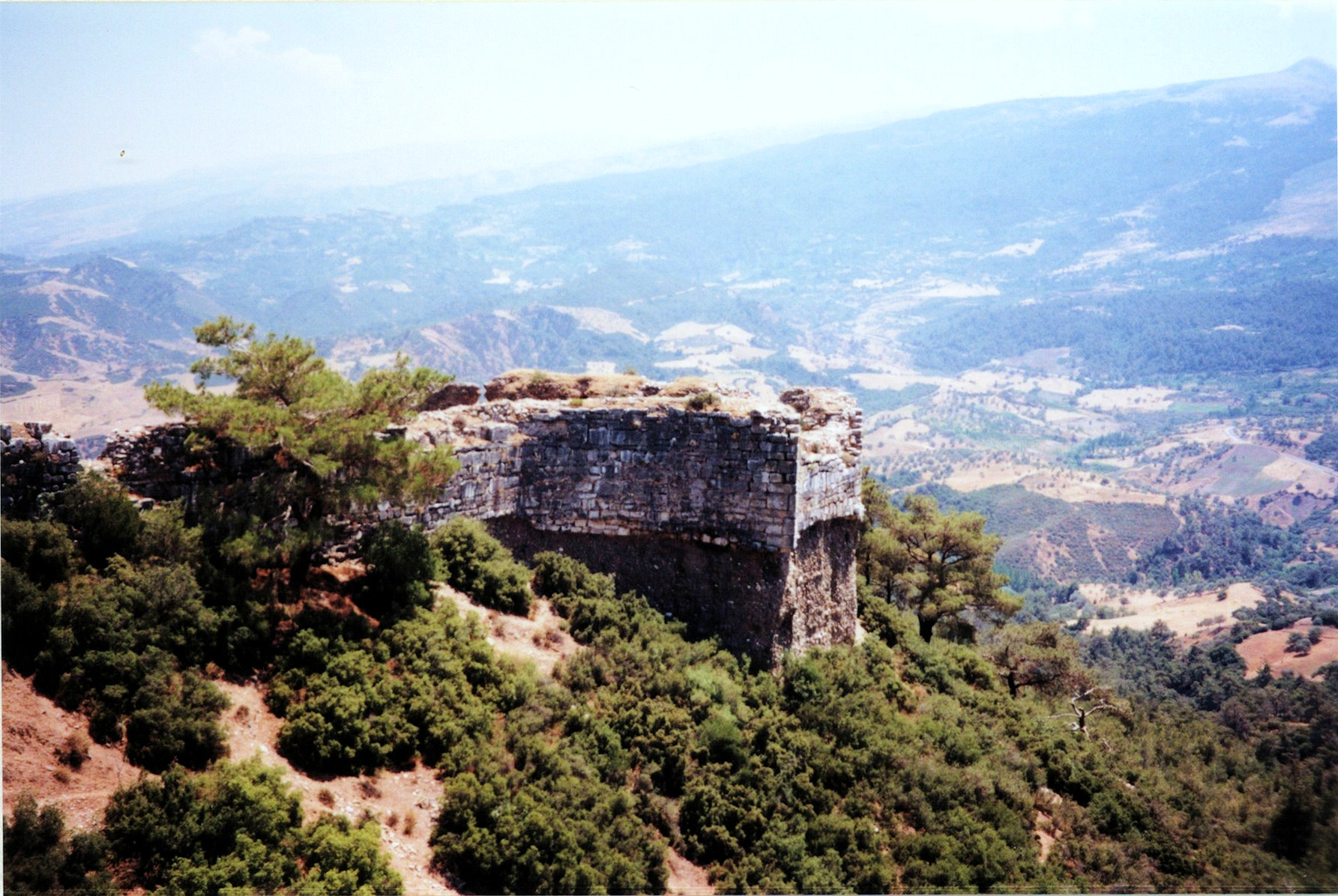
Inside the citadel of Sardis

Croesus was still confident in his chances because Sardis was a well-fortified city consecrated by ancient prophecies to never be captured. Additionally, he had sent for immediate aid from Sparta, the strongest state in Greece and his firm ally, and hoped to enlist the Egyptians, the Babylonians and others in his coalition against Persia as well. In fact, however, the Spartans were then occupied in a war with neighboring Argos, and neither they nor any other of Croesus's allies would assemble in time.

Cyrus had meanwhile stimulated his troops by the offer of large rewards to the first soldiers who should ascend the battlements, but repeated Persian attacks were repulsed with loss. According to Herodotus, the city ultimately fell by the agency of a Persian soldier, who climbed up a section of the walls that was neither adequately garrisoned nor protected by the ancient rites, which had dedicated the rest of the cities' defenses to impregnability. The steepness of the adjoining ground outside the walls was responsible for that piece of Lydian hubris. Hyroeades, the Persian soldier, saw a Lydian soldier climbing down the walls to retrieve a dropped helmet and tried to follow the example. The success of his ascent set the example to the rest of Cyrus's soldiers, and they swarmed over the exposed wall and promptly took the city.

== Aftermath ==
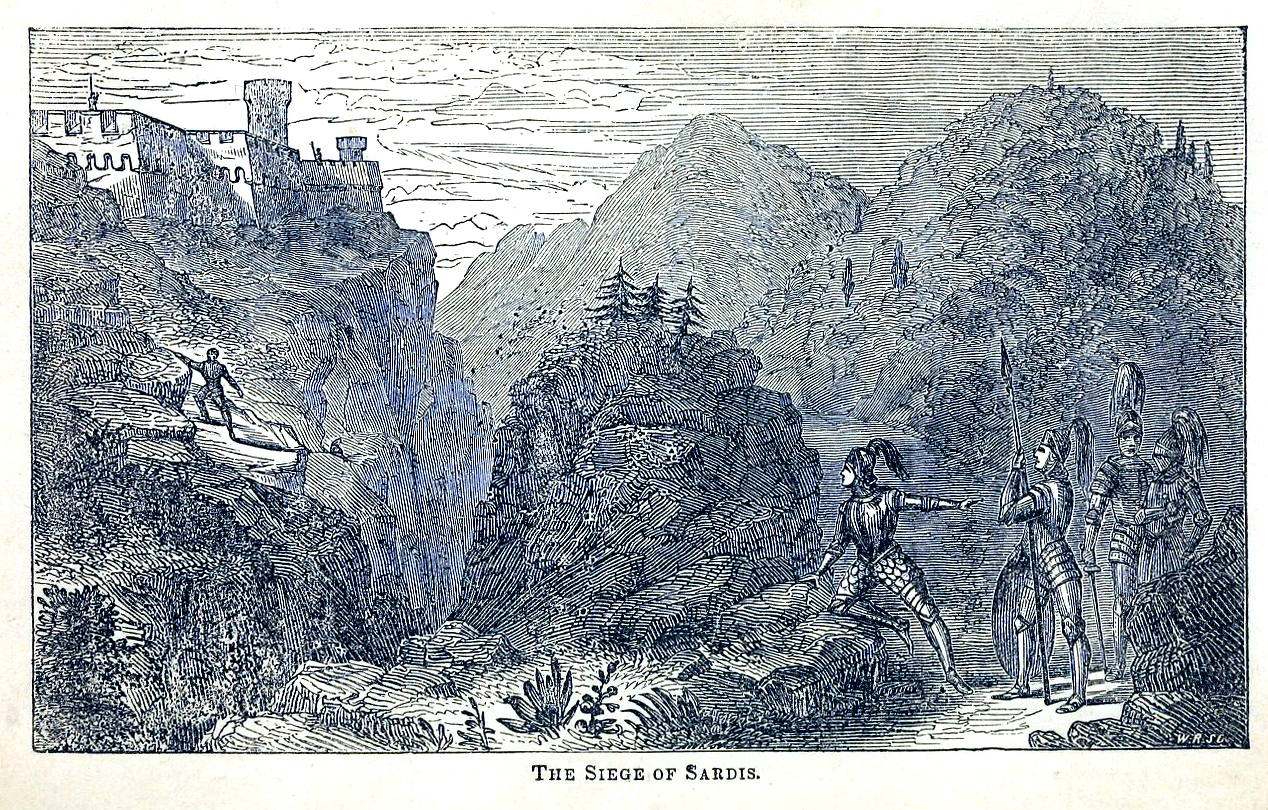
The siege of Sardis, 19th-century engraving

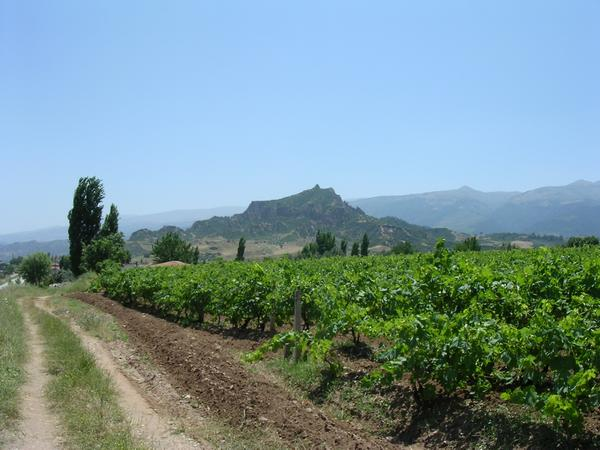
The Sardis citadel, seen from the west

Cyrus had issued orders for Croesus to be spared, and the latter was hauled a captive before his exulting foe. Cyrus' first intentions to burn Croesus alive on a pyre were soon diverted by the impulse of mercy for a fallen foe and, according to ancient versions, by divine intervention of Apollo, who caused a well-timed rainfall. Tradition represents the two kings as reconciled thereafter; Croesus succeeded in preventing the worst rigors of a sack by representing to his captor that it was Cyrus's, not Croesus's, property being plundered by the Persian soldiery.

The kingdom of Lydia came to an end with the fall of Sardis, and its subjection was confirmed in an unsuccessful revolt in the following year that was promptly crushed by Cyrus's lieutenants. The Aeolian and Ionian cities on the coast of Asia-Minor, formerly tributaries of Lydia, were likewise conquered not long afterward. That established the circumstances for Greco-Persian animosity, which would last until the outbreak of the Persian Wars in the succeeding century.

There was a second siege of Sardis, in 498 BC, during the Ionian Revolt.
