= 540 BC =

540 BC in various calendars
- Gregorian calendar: 540 BC; DXL BC
- Ab urbe condita: 214
- Ancient Egypt era: XXVI dynasty, 125
- Pharaoh: Amasis II, 31
- Ancient Greek Olympiad (summer): 60th Olympiad (victor)¹
- Assyrian calendar: 4211
- Balinese saka calendar: N/A
- Bengali calendar: −1133 – −1132
- Berber calendar: 411
- Buddhist calendar: 5
- Burmese calendar: −1177
- Byzantine calendar: 4969–4970
- Chinese calendar: 庚申年 (Metal Monkey); 2158 or 1951 — to — 辛酉年 (Metal Rooster); 2159 or 1952
- Coptic calendar: −823 – −822
- Discordian calendar: 627
- Ethiopian calendar: −547 – −546
- Hebrew calendar: 3221–3222
- Hindu calendars
- Vikram Samvat: −483 – −482
- Shaka Samvat: N/A
- Kali Yuga: 2561–2562
- Holocene calendar: 9461
- Iranian calendar: 1161 BP – 1160 BP
- Islamic calendar: 1197 BH – 1196 BH
- Javanese calendar: N/A
- Julian calendar: N/A
- Korean calendar: 1794
- Minguo calendar: 2451 before ROC 民前2451年
- Nanakshahi calendar: −2007
- Thai solar calendar: 3–4
- Tibetan calendar: ལྕགས་ཕོ་སྤྲེ་ལོ་ (male Iron-Monkey) −413 or −794 or −1566 — to — ལྕགས་མོ་བྱ་ལོ་ (female Iron-Bird) −412 or −793 or −1565

The year 540 BC was a year of the pre-Julian Roman calendar. In the Roman Empire, it was known as year 214 Ab urbe condita. The denomination 540 BC for this year has been used since the early medieval period, when the Anno Domini calendar era became the prevalent method in Europe for naming years.

== Events ==
- Cyrus attacks Babylonia.
- Greek city of Elea of southern Italy is founded (approximate date).
- Persians conquer Lycian city of Xanthos (approximate date).
- Amasis Painter makes Dionysos with maenads, black-figure decoration on an amphora.
- Exekias makes The Suicide of Ajax, black-figure decoration on an amphora.
- Amyntas I becomes king of Macedonia (approximate date).
- Comet Hale–Bopp appears in the evening sky, making its closest approach to Earth. Its next appearance occurs in 1997.

== Births ==
- Epicharmus of Kos, Greek dramatist (approximate date; d. c. 450 BC)
- Heraclitus, Greek philosopher, born in Ephesus (approximate year)
- Leonidas I, leader of the 300 Spartans at the Battle of Thermopylae (approximate date; d. 480 BC)
- Vardhamana Mahavira, the twenty-fourth and last Tirthankara of the Jains 450 BC
