= Pteria (Cappadocia) =

Populated place in ancient Cappadocia

Coordinates: 39°44′54″N 35°03′56″E

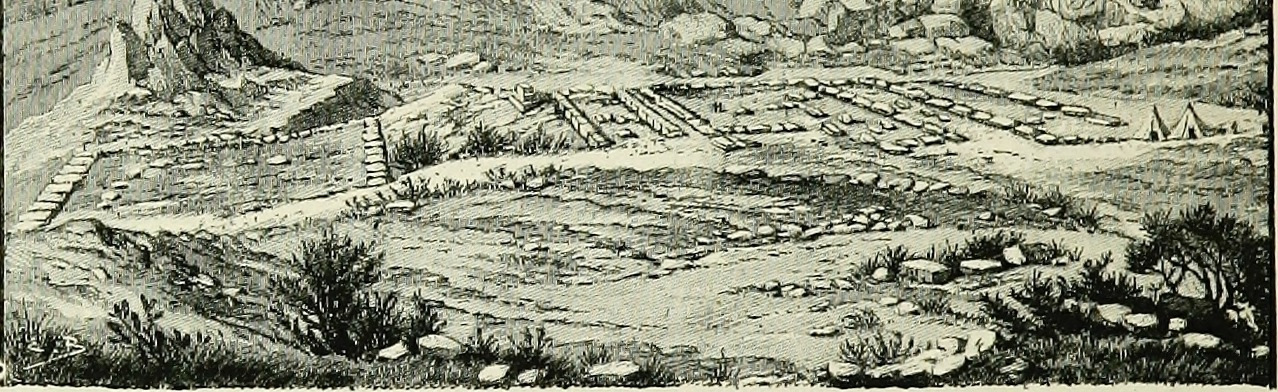
The ruins of Pteria from the book "History of Egypt, Chaldea, Syria, Babylonia and Assyria (1903)"

Pteria (Ancient Greek: Πτερία) was the capital of the Leucosyri in northern Cappadocia. They were said by Herodotus to have been taken and ruined by Croesus in 547 BCE. It also was the place of the Battle of Pteria, an undecided battle between Cyrus the Great and Croesus.

Stephanus of Byzantium cites two towns with this or a similar name: a Pterium, which he calls a town of the Medes, and Pteria, a town in the territory of Sinope.

Its site is located near Kerkenes Dağ, Asiatic Turkey.
