= Pteria (Paphlagonia) =

Town of ancient Paphlagonia

Coordinates: 41°19′18″N 35°06′32″E

Pteria (Ancient Greek: Πτερία) was a town of ancient Paphlagonia, inhabited from Classical through Byzantine times.

Its site is tentatively located near Eğrikale, Asiatic Turkey.
