= Helenopolis (Lydia) =

Helenopolis was a possibly a town and episcopal see in ancient Lydia, reported by the Catholic Encyclopedia (1910), but refuted by William Mitchell Ramsay in his The Historical Geography of Asia Minor (1890) where he claims that Le Quien "invented" the place by misreading the Greek records.

== Ecclesiastical history ==
The episcopal see of Helenopolis was a suffragan of the See of Sardis in Lydia.
