= Aribaeus =

Ancient Cappadocian king

Aribaeus (Ancient Greek: Ἀρίβαιος), the king of the Cappadocians, was slain by the Hyrcanians, in the time of Cyrus the Great (that is, 6th century BCE), according to Xenophon's Cyropaedia.
