= 543 BC =

543 BC in various calendars
- Gregorian calendar: 543 BC; DXLIII BC
- Ab urbe condita: 211
- Ancient Egypt era: XXVI dynasty, 122
- Pharaoh: Amasis II, 28
- Ancient Greek Olympiad (summer): 59th Olympiad, year 2
- Assyrian calendar: 4208
- Balinese saka calendar: N/A
- Bengali calendar: −1136 – −1135
- Berber calendar: 408
- Buddhist calendar: 2
- Burmese calendar: −1180
- Byzantine calendar: 4966–4967
- Chinese calendar: 丁巳年 (Fire Snake); 2155 or 1948 — to — 戊午年 (Earth Horse); 2156 or 1949
- Coptic calendar: −826 – −825
- Discordian calendar: 624
- Ethiopian calendar: −550 – −549
- Hebrew calendar: 3218–3219
- Hindu calendars
- Vikram Samvat: −486 – −485
- Shaka Samvat: N/A
- Kali Yuga: 2558–2559
- Holocene calendar: 9458
- Iranian calendar: 1164 BP – 1163 BP
- Islamic calendar: 1200 BH – 1199 BH
- Javanese calendar: N/A
- Julian calendar: N/A
- Korean calendar: 1791
- Minguo calendar: 2454 before ROC 民前2454年
- Nanakshahi calendar: −2010
- Thai solar calendar: 0–1
- Tibetan calendar: མེ་མོ་སྦྲུལ་ལོ་ (female Fire-Snake) −416 or −797 or −1569 — to — ས་ཕོ་རྟ་ལོ་ (male Earth-Horse) −415 or −796 or −1568

The year 543 BC was a year of the pre-Julian Roman calendar. In the Roman Empire, it was known as year 211 Ab urbe condita. The denomination 543 BC for this year has been used since the early medieval period, when the Anno Domini calendar era became the prevalent method in Europe for naming years.

== Events ==
- North Indian Prince Vijaya invades Ceylon and establishes a Sinhalese dynasty after he was banished from his father's kingdom
- Pisistratus, tyrant of Athens, purifies the island of Delos. (approximate)
- Guided by Chinese statesman Zi Chan, the State of Zheng institutes a formal code of law.
- Pisistraus, ruler of Athens sanctifies the island of Delos

== Deaths ==
- Gautama Buddha Mahaparinibbana (traditional in Thailand and elsewhere - basis of Thai solar calendar)
- Thales, Greek passes away.
