= 546 BC =

546 BC in various calendars
- Gregorian calendar: 546 BC; DXLVI BC
- Ab urbe condita: 208
- Ancient Egypt era: XXVI dynasty, 119
- Pharaoh: Amasis II, 25
- Ancient Greek Olympiad (summer): 58th Olympiad, year 3
- Assyrian calendar: 4205
- Balinese saka calendar: N/A
- Bengali calendar: −1139 – −1138
- Berber calendar: 405
- Buddhist calendar: −1
- Burmese calendar: −1183
- Byzantine calendar: 4963–4964
- Chinese calendar: 甲寅年 (Wood Tiger); 2152 or 1945 — to — 乙卯年 (Wood Rabbit); 2153 or 1946
- Coptic calendar: −829 – −828
- Discordian calendar: 621
- Ethiopian calendar: −553 – −552
- Hebrew calendar: 3215–3216
- Hindu calendars
- Vikram Samvat: −489 – −488
- Shaka Samvat: N/A
- Kali Yuga: 2555–2556
- Holocene calendar: 9455
- Iranian calendar: 1167 BP – 1166 BP
- Islamic calendar: 1203 BH – 1202 BH
- Javanese calendar: N/A
- Julian calendar: N/A
- Korean calendar: 1788
- Minguo calendar: 2457 before ROC 民前2457年
- Nanakshahi calendar: −2013
- Thai solar calendar: −3 – −2
- Tibetan calendar: ཤིང་ཕོ་སྟག་ལོ་ (male Wood-Tiger) −419 or −800 or −1572 — to — ཤིང་མོ་ཡོས་ལོ་ (female Wood-Hare) −418 or −799 or −1571

The year 546 BC was a year of the pre-Julian Roman calendar. In the Roman Empire, it was known as year 208 Ab urbe condita. The denomination 546 BC for this year has been used since the early medieval period, when the Anno Domini calendar era became the prevalent method in Europe for naming years.

== Events ==
- Lydia is conquered by Persia.
- Cyrus makes Pasargadae the capital of Persia.
- Peisistratus takes power in Athens.
- Eupalinos of Megara, a Greek architect, builds aqueducts that supply water to Athens.
- Cyrus establishes a garrison in Sardis and incorporates the Greek cities of Ionia in Asia Minor into the Achaemenid Empire.
- A coup takes place in the state of Qi.
- Jin and Chu agreed to the truce of Mibing, ending their constant military engagement.

== Deaths ==
- Thales, Greek philosopher (approximate date)
