= Battle of Pteria =

Battle between Croesus of Lydia and Cyrus the Great of Persian Empire

- Part of the Campaigns of Cyrus the Great
Date	Autumn 547 BC
Location	Pteria, Cappadocia (modern-day Kerkenes, Yozgat, Turkey) 39.9167°N 35.3333°E
Result	Indecisive

Belligerents
Lydia	Achaemenid Empire

Commanders and leaders
Croesus	Cyrus the Great

Strength
95,000 (ancient sources)	20,000 (ancient sources)

Casualties and losses
Heavy	Heavy
- Approximate location of the Battle of Pteria

The Battle of Pteria (Ancient Greek: Πτερία) was fought in 547 BC between the Persian forces of Cyrus the Great and the Lydian forces of Croesus. Both armies suffered heavy casualties in this indecisive battle.

== Background ==
Croesus learned of the sudden Persian uprising and defeat of his longtime rivals, the Medes. He attempted to use these set of events to expand his borders upon the eastern frontier of Lydia, by making an alliance with Chaldea, Egypt and several Greek city-states, including Sparta. Prior to his invasion, Croesus asked the Oracle of Delphi for advice. The Oracle suggested vaguely that, "if King Croesus crosses the Halys River, a great empire will be destroyed." Croesus received these words most favorably, instigating a war that ironically would eventually end not the Persian Empire but his own.

Croesus began the campaign with an invasion of Cappadocia, crossing the Halys and capturing Pteria, then capital of the district and formidable as a fortress. The city was sacked, (Note: McMahon and Steadman state Croesus demolished Pteria.) and the inhabitants enslaved.

Cyrus advanced to halt the Lydian incursion. He incorporated northern Mesopotamia, while receiving the voluntary capitulation of Armenia, Cappadocia, and Cilicia.

== Battle ==
Both armies met in the vicinity of the fallen city. Cyrus was said to have been heavily outnumbered, with only 25,000 men against what is said to have been near 100,000 (though this is likely an exaggeration). Fierce urban combat followed, during which Cyrus and Croesus both personally led teams of troops into the streets of the abandoned city. Cyrus' leadership and bravery, along with the refusal of the Persian Immortals to retreat when pressed, is said to have allowed the Persians to hold off. The urban fighting continued till nightfall, but was inconclusive. Both sides sustained considerable casualties; in the aftermath, the outnumbered Croesus withdrew across the Halys. The retreat of Croesus was a strategic decision to suspend operations using winter to his advantage, awaiting the arrival of reinforcements from his allies the Babylonians, the Egyptians and particularly the Spartans. This would prove to be a mistake, as Cyrus was able to quickly follow in his enemy's wake while the main Persian army (still mustering) assembled.

== Aftermath ==
Despite the arrival of winter, Cyrus continued his march on Sardis. The dispersal of Croesus' army exposed Lydia to the unexpected winter campaign of Cyrus, who almost immediately followed Croesus back to Sardis. The rival kings fought again at the Battle of Thymbra, before Sardis, which ended in a decisive victory for Cyrus the Great.

== Sources ==
- Allen, T.W. (1910). "The Homeric Catalogue". The Journal of Hellenic Studies. 30. The Society for the Promotion of Hellenic Studies: 292–322. doi:10.2307/624307. JSTOR 624307.
- Briant, Pierre (2002). From Cyrus to Alexander: A History of the Persian Empire. Pennsylvania University Press.
- Brosius, Maria (2006). The Persians. Routledge.
- Eggenberger, David (1985). An Encyclopedia of Battles: Accounts of Over 1,560 Battles from 1479 B.C. to the Present. Courier Dover Publications.
- Herodotus (1998). The Histories. Translated by Waterfield, Robin. Oxford University Press.
- McMahon, Gregory; Steadman, Sharon R., eds. (2011). The Oxford Handbook of Ancient Anatolia (10,000-323 BCE). Oxford University Press.
- Mikalson, Jon D. (2003). Herodotus and Religion in the Persian Wars. University of North Carolina.
- Shahbazi, A. Shapour (2012). "The Achaemenid Persian Empire (550-330 BCE)". In Daryaee, Touraj (ed.). The Oxford Handbook of Iranian History. Oxford University Press.
- Tucker, Spencer C. (2010). Battles That Changed History: An Encyclopedia of World Conflict. ABC-CLIO.
- Young, T. Cuyler (1988). "The early history of the Medes and the Persians and the Achaemenid empire to the death of Cambyses". In Boardman, John; Hammond, N.G.L.; Lewis, D.M.; Ostwald, M. (eds.). The Cambridge Ancient History. Vol. IV: Persia, Greece and the Western Mediterranean, c.525-479 B.C. Cambridge University Press.
