= Hellenopolis =

Hellenopolis was also a name of Harran in the ancient province of Syria.

Hellenopolis (Ancient Greek: Ἑλληνόπολις) was a city in Anatolia (perhaps Bithynia or Mysia) founded by an Attalus, by gathering together the inhabitants of a number of Greek cities.
