= Lydia =

Ancient Anatolian kingdom

Coordinates: 40°N 30°E

Kingdom of Lydia
- 1200–546 BC
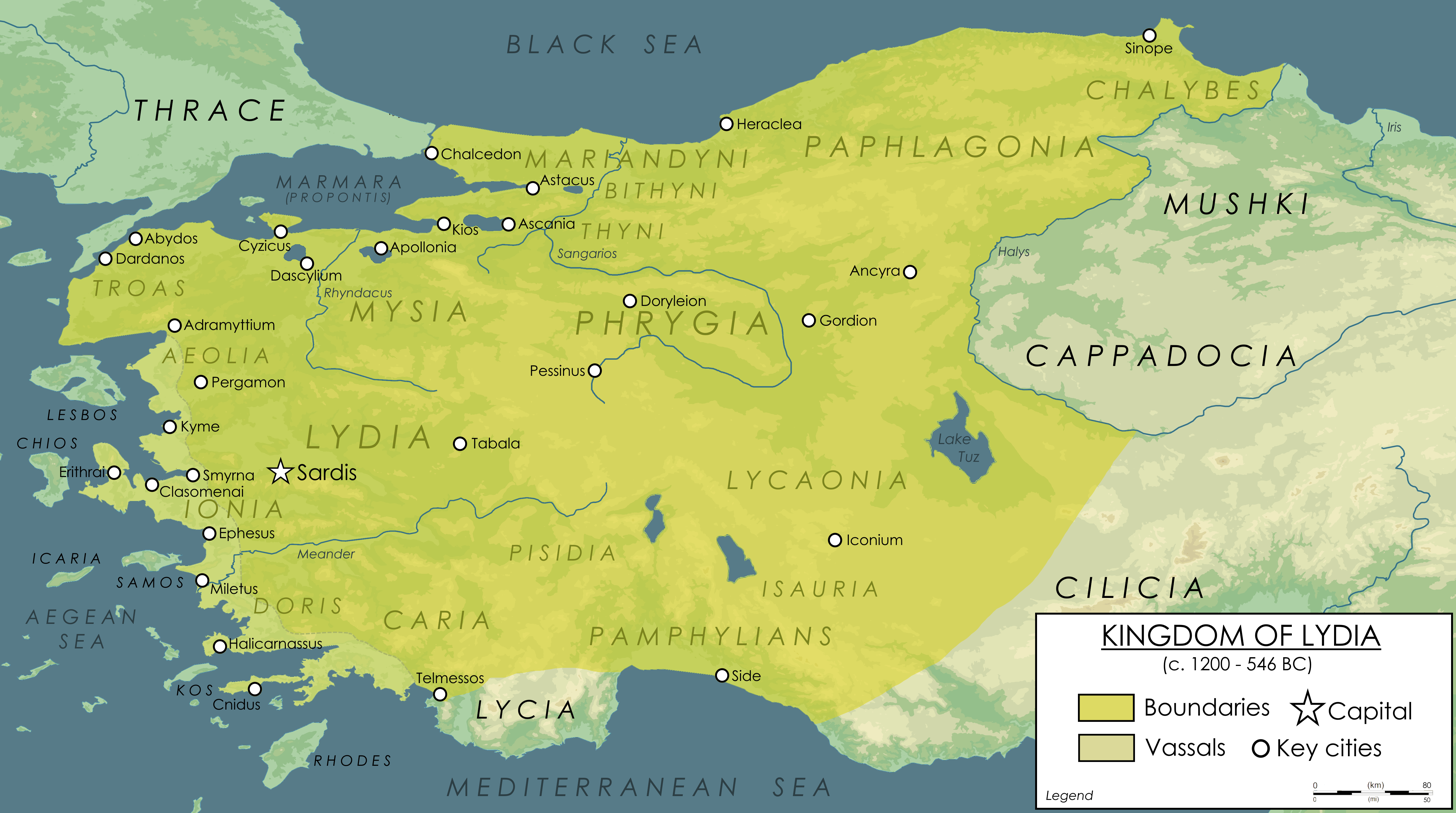
- Map of the Lydian Kingdom in its final period of sovereignty under Croesus, c. 547 BC.
- Capital: Sardis
- Common languages: Lydian
- Religion: Lydian religion
- Government: Monarchy
- Kings
  - 680–644 BC: Gyges
  - 644–637 BC: Ardys
  - 637–635 BC: Sadyattes
  - 635–585 BC: Alyattes
  - 585–546 BC: Croesus
- Historical era: Iron Age
  - Bronze Age Collapse: 1200 BC
  - Lydian-Cimmerian Wars: 670–630s BC
  - Lydian–Milesian War: 612–600 BC
  - Lydian-Median War: 590–585 BC
  - Fall to Persia: 546 BC
- Currency: Croeseid
Preceded by
Hittites
Phrygia
Cimmerians
Treri
Ionian League
Succeeded by
Achaemenid Empire
- Today part of: Turkey

Lydia (Ancient Greek: Λυδία, romanized: Ludía; Latin: Lȳdia) was a powerful Iron Age civilization prominent in western Anatolia in the 8th to 6th centuries BCE. Its capital and only city was Sardis. They are known in part for the world's first coinage, and rapid expansion based on their immense wealth in gold. They established cultural, economic, military, and diplomatic relations with the Greeks to their west, and the Assyrians, Babylonians, Egyptians, Phrygians, and others to the east and south.

The Lydian civilization had their own Indo-European language and an independent religious system. Their capital, Sardis, is known for its layout and architectural design; its terracing method influenced the planning of other multi-level cities. The ancient burial mounds at Bin Tepe are among the largest on Earth.

At some point before 800 BC, the Lydian people achieved a certain level of political cohesion, and existed as an independent kingdom by the 600s BC. At its greatest extent, during the 7th century BC, it covered all of western Anatolia. In 546 BC, it became a satrapy of the Achaemenid Empire, known as Sparda in Old Persian. In 133 BC, it became part of the Roman province of Asia.

Lydian coins, made of electrum, are among the oldest in existence, dated to around the 7th century BC.

== Geography ==
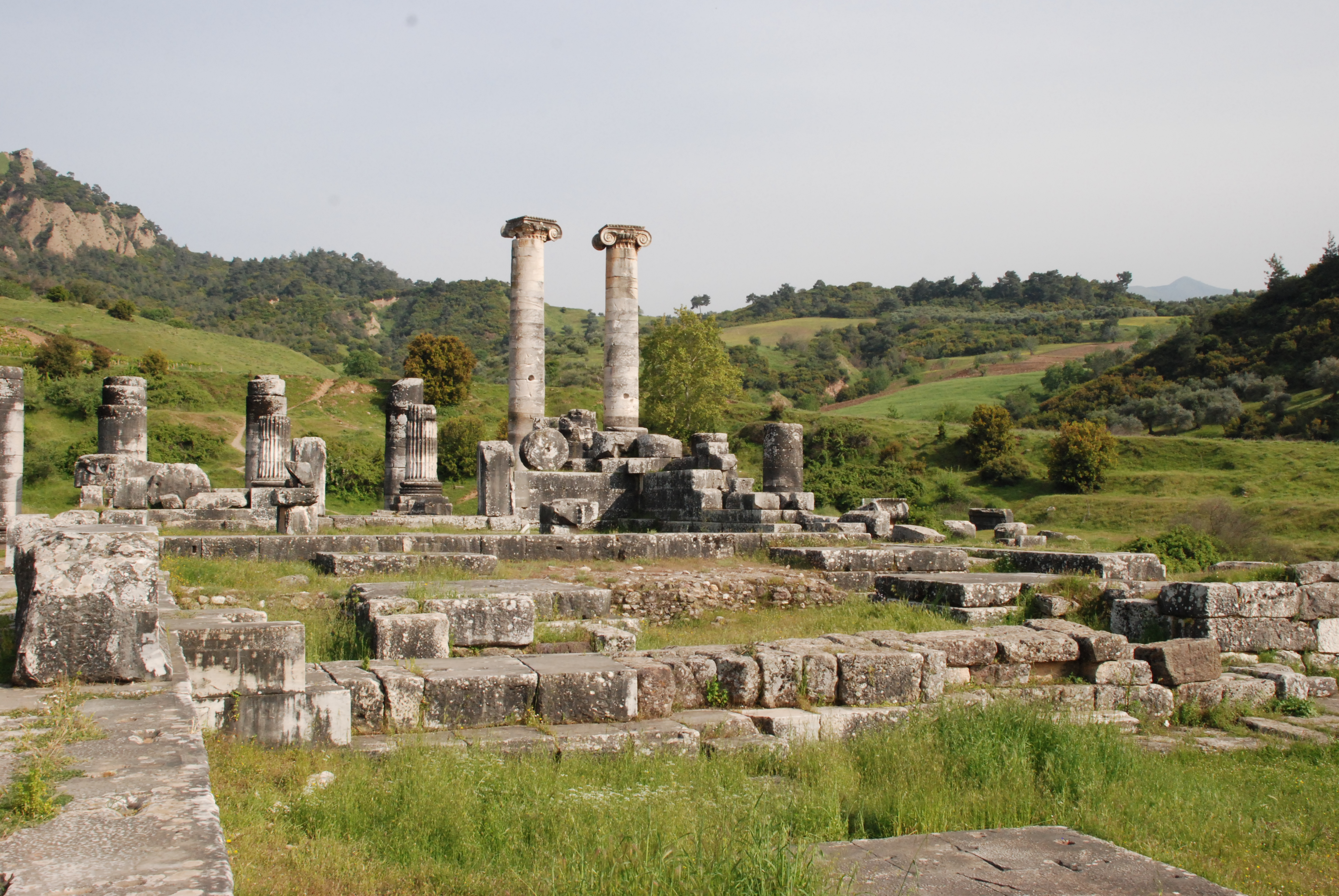
The temple of Artemis in Sardis, capital of Lydia

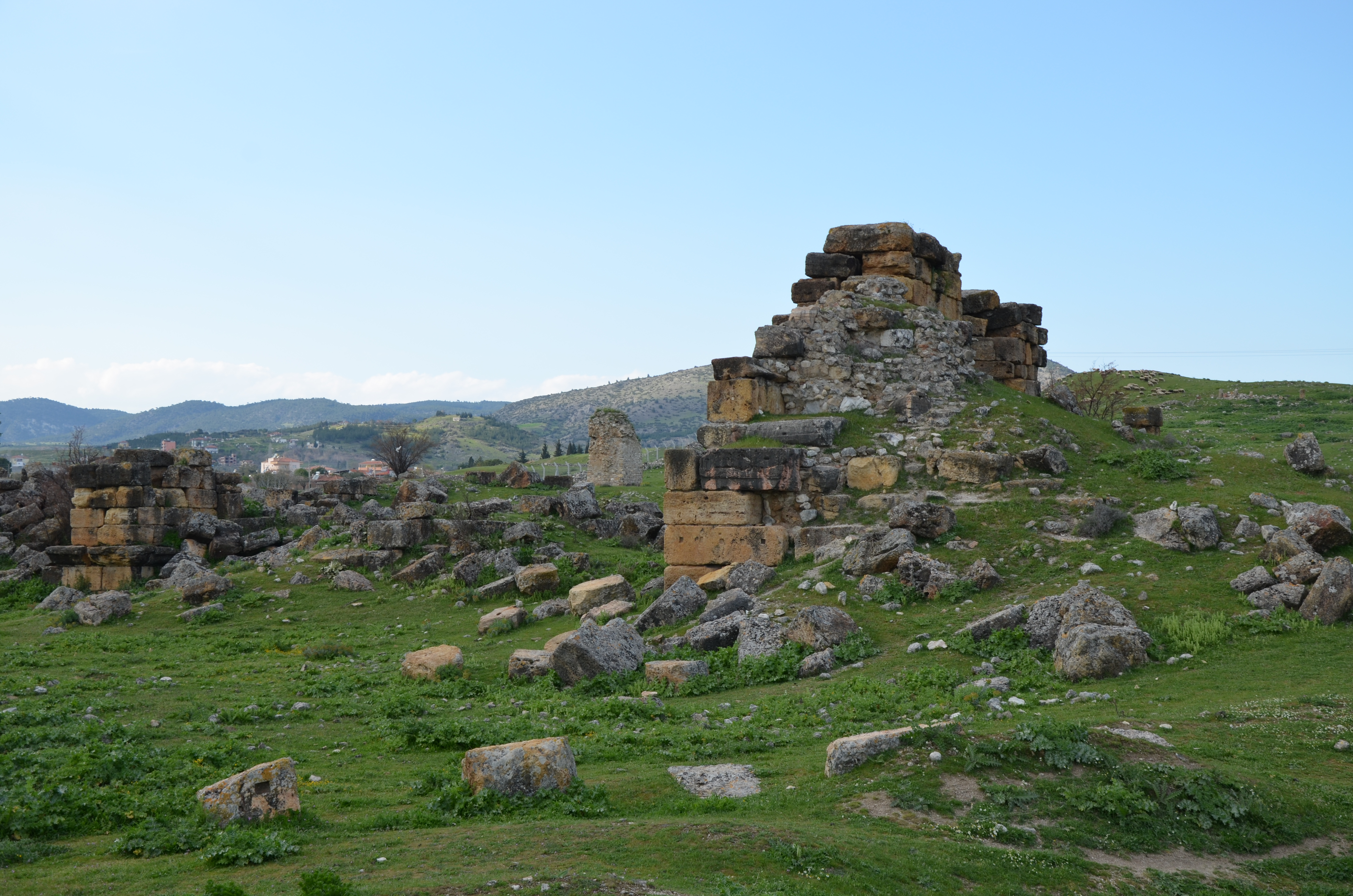
Tripolis on the Meander is an ancient Lydian city in Turkey.

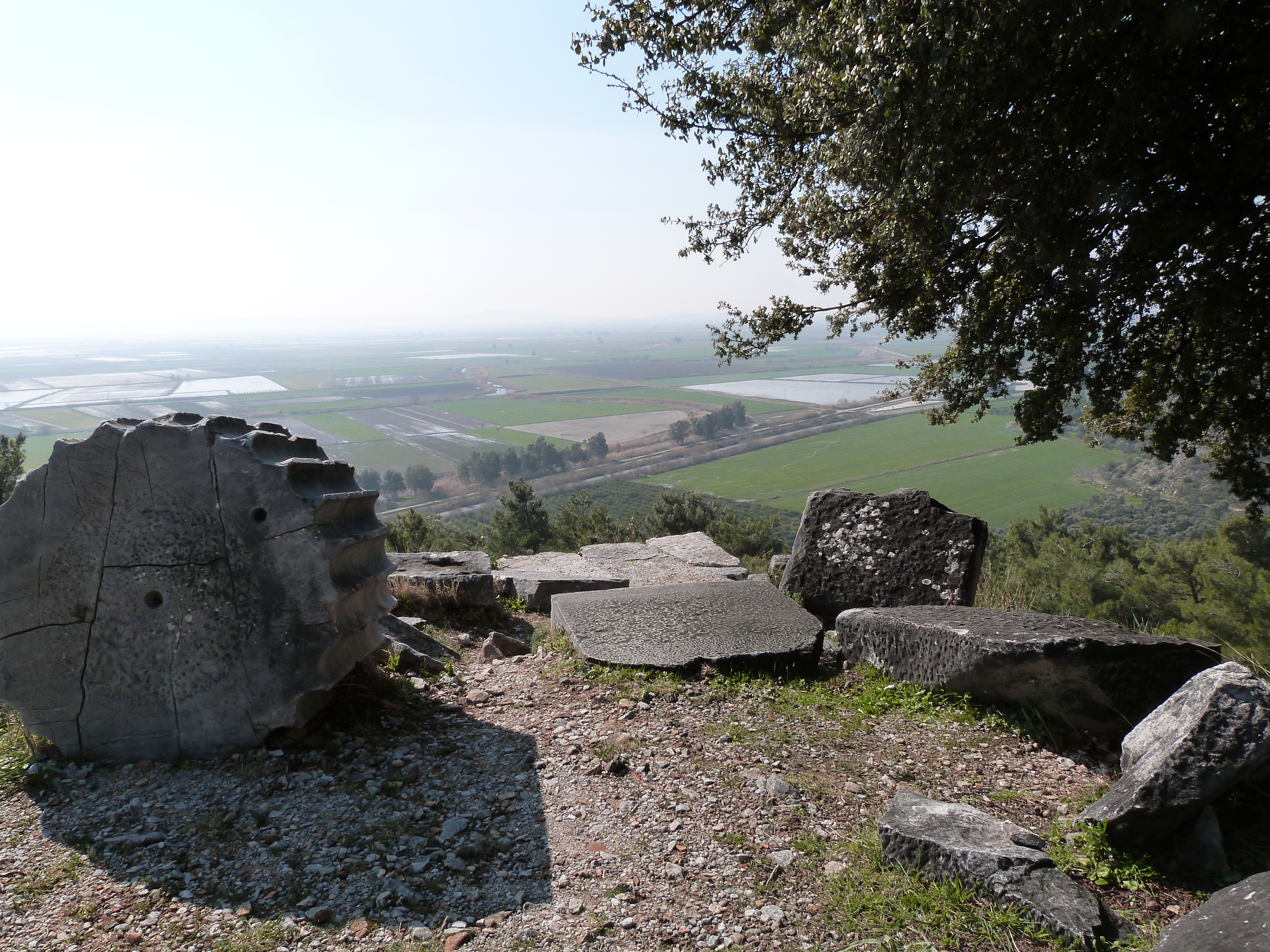
Büyük Menderes River, also known as the Maeander, is a river in Lydia.

Lydia is generally located east of ancient Ionia in the modern western Turkish provinces of Uşak, Manisa and inland İzmir.

The boundaries of historical Lydia varied across the centuries. It was bounded first by Mysia, Caria, Phrygia and coastal Ionia. Later, the military power of Alyattes and Croesus expanded Lydia, which, with its capital at Sardis, controlled all Asia Minor west of the River Halys, except Lycia. After the Persian conquest the River Maeander was regarded as its southern boundary, and during imperial Roman times Lydia comprised the country between Mysia and Caria on the one side and Phrygia and the Aegean Sea on the other.

== Language ==
The Lydian language, which became extinct during the 1st century BC, was an Indo-European language in the Anatolian language family, related to Luwian and Hittite. However, Lydian is usually not categorized as part of the Luwic subgroup, unlike the other nearby Anatolian languages Luwian, Carian, and Lycian.

It has an alphabetic writing system related to Greek. Older texts may be written left-to-right, or right-to-left, but later ones were only right-to-left.

Lydian is attested in grafitti and on coins, from the 8th or 7th century to the 3rd century BCE. About a hundred texts in Lydian exist, almost all located near Sardis, with about 30 being complete and longer than a few words. The longest and best examples are from the 5th and 4th century BCE, and are in stone. Some are decrees, but most are found on tombs or gravestones. A handful are in verse, with terminal vowel assonance. One bilingual text in Aramaic and Lydian helped define a basic grammar of Lydian.

Due to its fragmentary attestation, the meanings of many words are unknown but much of the grammar has been determined. Similar to other Anatolian languages, it featured extensive use of prefixes and grammatical particles to chain clauses together. Lydian had also undergone extensive syncope, leading to numerous consonant clusters atypical of most Indo-European languages.

== History ==
=== Origins ===
Lydia's early history remains shrouded in obscurity. During the Late Bronze Age (1600 BC – 1200 BC), the territory that later became Lydia was part of a broader polity called Arzawa; in particular, Lydia would subsume sub-kingdoms of Arzawa named Mira and Šeḫa, as well as the city-state of Apasa (the precursor of the Greek Eφεσος Ephesus). Like the other Arzawa sub-states, they had tumultuous relations with the Hittite Empire, acting both as allies, enemies, and vassals at various points in time.

At approximately around 800 BC, the Lydian people appear to have established their presence and achieved some degree of political cohesion. However, precise dates and events are impossible to determine due to the absence of contemporary written records. The only firm evidence for this early period comes from the archaeological excavations at Sardis. Although certain literary accounts purport the existence of two early Lydian dynasties, namely the house of Atys – after whose son Lydus the Lydians were supposedly named – and the Heraclids, who allegedly ruled for twenty-two generations before 685 BC, these sources are steeped in mythology and lack historical credibility.

=== Kingdom of Lydia ===
Lydia was an independent kingdom from an unknown time until 546 BC.

==== Candaules ====
According to Herodotus, one of Lydus's descendants was Iardanus, with whom Heracles was in service at one time. Heracles had an affair with one of Iardanus' slave-girls and their son Alcaeus was the first of the Heraclid Dynasty said to have ruled Lydia for 22 generations starting with Agron. In the 8th century BC, Meles became the 21st and penultimate Heraclid king and the last was his son Candaules (died c. 687 BC).

==== The Mermnad Empire (680–546 BC) ====
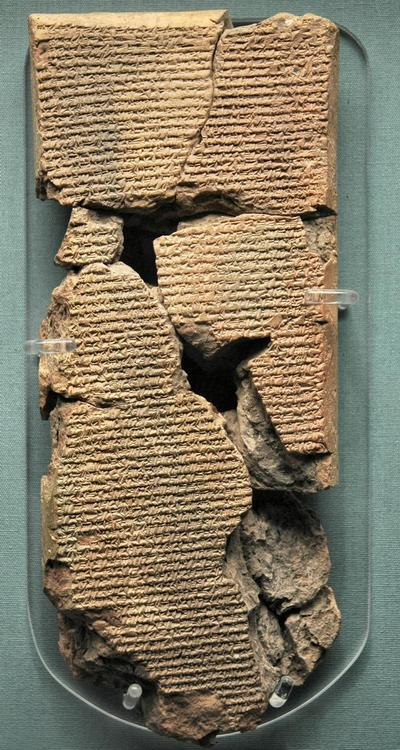
Gyges tablet, British Museum

===== Gyges =====
Gyges was the first Lydian king whose existence is demonstrable from contemporary records. According to semi-mythical accounts of his reign, he was the son of a man named Dascylus and came to power by overthrowing King Candaules with the assistance of a Carian prince from Mylasa named Arselis. Gyges's rise to power happened in the context of a period of turmoil following the invasion of the Cimmerians, a nomadic people from the Pontic steppe who had invaded Western Asia, who around 675 BC destroyed the previous major power in Anatolia, the kingdom of Phrygia.

Gyges took advantage of the power vacuum created by the Cimmerian invasions to consolidate his kingdom and make it a military power, he contacted the Neo-Assyrian court by sending diplomats to Nineveh to seek help against the Cimmerian invasions, and he attacked the Ionian Greek cities of Miletus, Smyrna, and Colophon. Gyges's extensive alliances with the Carian dynasts allowed him to recruit Carian and Ionian Greek soldiers to send overseas to assist the Egyptian king Psamtik I of the city of Sais, with whom he had established contacts around 662 BC. With the help of these armed forces, Psamtik I united Egypt under his rule after eliminating the eleven other kinglets with whom he had been co-ruling Lower Egypt.

In 644 BC, Lydia faced a third attack by the Cimmerians, led by their king Lygdamis. This time, the Lydians were defeated, Sardis was sacked, and Gyges was killed.

===== Ardys and Sadyattes =====
Gyges was succeeded by his son Ardys, who resumed diplomatic activity with Assyria and would also have to face the Cimmerians. Ardys attacked the Ionian Greek city of Miletus and succeeded in capturing the city of Priene, after which Priene would remain under direct rule of the Lydian kingdom until its end.

Ardys's reign was short-lived, and in 637 BC, that is in Ardys's seventh regnal year, the Thracian Treres tribe who had migrated across the Thracian Bosporus and invaded Anatolia, under their king Kobos, and in alliance with the Cimmerians and the Lycians, attacked Lydia. They defeated the Lydians again and for a second time sacked the Lydian capital of Sardis, except for its citadel. It is probable that Ardys was killed during this Cimmerian attack.

Ardys was succeeded by his son, Sadyattes, who had an even more short-lived reign. Sadyattes died in 635 BC, and it is possible that, like his grandfather Gyges and maybe his father Ardys as well, he died fighting the Cimmerians.

===== Alyattes =====
Amidst extreme turmoil, Sadyattes was succeeded in 635 BC by his son Alyattes, who would transform Lydia into a powerful empire.

Soon after Alyattes's ascension and early during his reign, with Assyrian approval and in alliance with the Lydians, the Scythians under their king Madyes entered Anatolia, expelled the Treres from Asia Minor, and defeated the Cimmerians so that they no longer constituted a threat again, following which the Scythians extended their domination to Central Anatolia until they were themselves expelled by the Medes from Western Asia in the 590s BC. This final defeat of the Cimmerians was carried out by the joint forces of Madyes, whom Strabo credits with expelling the Treres and Cimmerians from Asia Minor, and of Alyattes, whom Herodotus and Polyaenus claim finally defeated the Cimmerians.

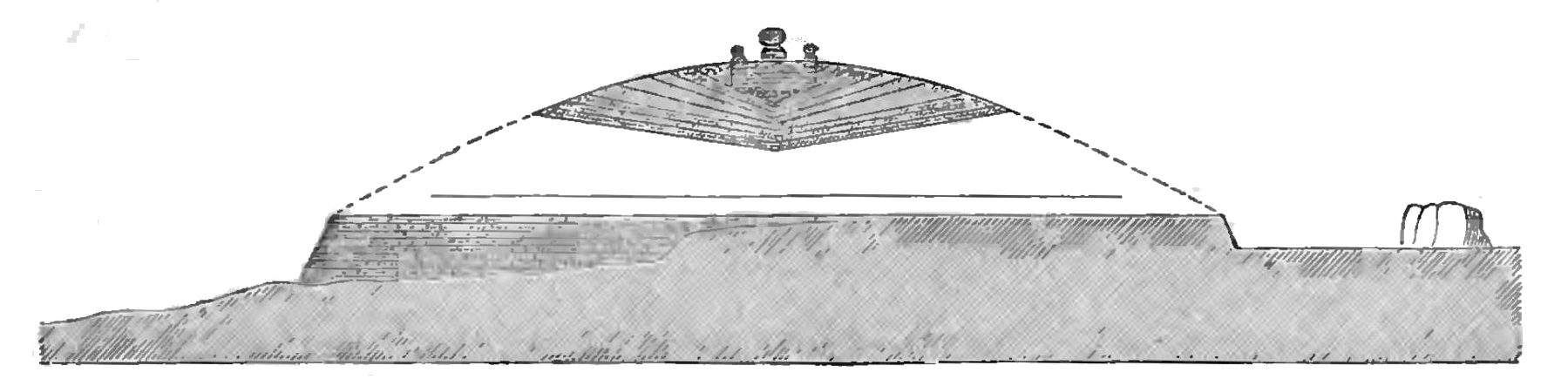
Tomb of Alyattes.

Alyattes turned towards Phrygia in the east, where he extended Lydian rule eastwards to Phrygia. Alyattes continued his expansionist policy in the east, and of all the peoples to the west of the Halys River whom Herodotus claimed Alyattes's successor Croesus ruled over – the Lydians, Phrygians, Mysians, Mariandyni, Chalybes, Paphlagonians, Thyni and Bithyni Thracians, Carians, Ionians, Dorians, Aeolians, and Pamphylians – it is very likely that a number of these populations had already been conquered under Alyattes, and it is not impossible that the Lydians might have subjected Lycia, given that the Lycian coast would have been important for the Lydians because it was close to a trade route connecting the Aegean region, the Levant, and Cyprus.

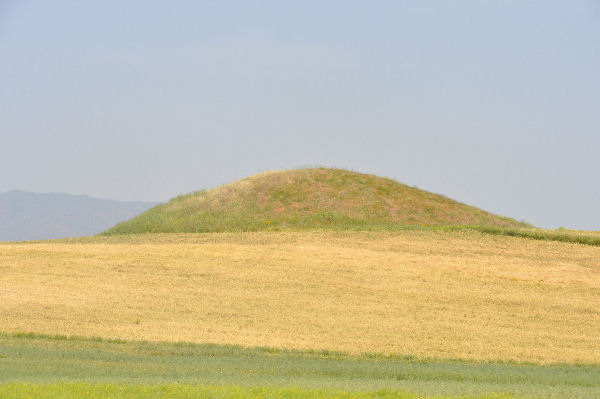
Bin Tepe royal funeral tumulus (tomb of Alyattes, father of Croesus), Lydia, 6th century BC.

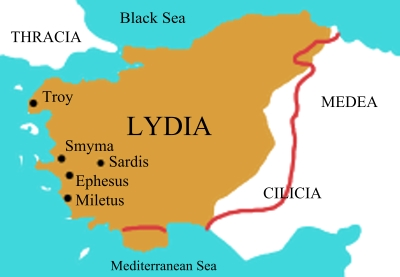
Lydia's borders under the reign of Croesus

Alyattes's eastern conquests brought the Lydian Empire in conflict in the 590s BC with the Medes, and a war broke out between the Median and Lydian Empires in 590 BC which was waged in eastern Anatolia lasted five years, until a solar eclipse occurred in 585 BC during a battle (hence called the Battle of the Eclipse) opposing the Lydian and Median armies, which both sides interpreted as an omen to end the war. The Babylonian king Nebuchadnezzar II and the king Syennesis of Cilicia acted as mediators in the ensuing peace treaty, which was sealed by the marriage of the Median king Cyaxares's son Astyages with Alyattes's daughter Aryenis, and the possible wedding of a daughter of Cyaxares with either Alyattes or with his son Croesus.

===== Croesus =====
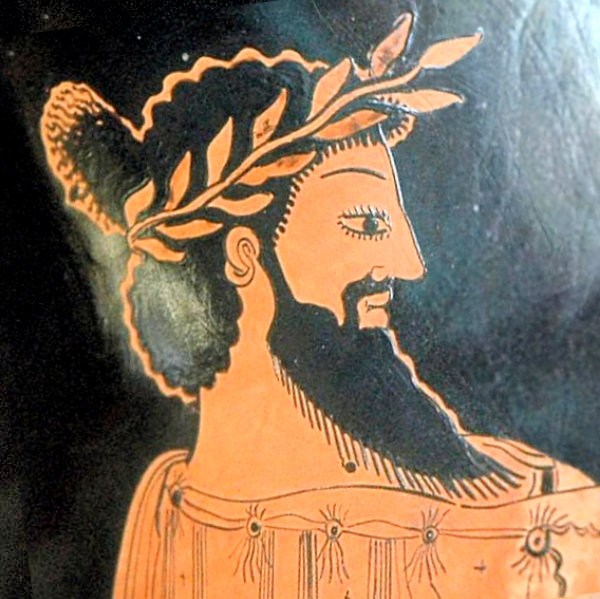
Portrait of Croesus, last king of Lydia, Attic red-figure amphora, painted ca. 500–490 BC.

Alyattes died shortly after the Battle of the Eclipse, in 585 BC itself, following which Lydia faced a power struggle between his son Pantaleon, born from a Greek woman, and his other son Croesus, born from a Carian noblewoman, out of which the latter emerged successful.

Croesus brought Caria under the direct control of the Lydian Empire, and he subjugated all of mainland Ionia, Aeolis, and Doris, but he abandoned his plans of annexing the Greek city-states on the islands of the Aegean Sea and he instead concluded treaties of friendship with them, which might have helped him participate in the lucrative trade the Aegean Greeks carried out with Egypt at Naucratis. According to Herodotus, Croesus ruled over all the peoples to the west of the Halys River, although the actual border of his kingdom was further to the east of the Halys, at an undetermined point in eastern Anatolia.

Croesus continued the friendly relations with the Medes concluded between his father Alyattes and the Median king Cyaxares, and he continued these good relations with the Medes after he succeeded Alyattes and Astyages succeeded Cyaxares. And, under Croesus's rule, Lydia continued its good relations started by Gyges with the Saite Egyptian kingdom, then ruled by the pharaoh Amasis II. Croesus also established trade and diplomatic relations with the Neo-Babylonian Empire of Nabonidus, and he further increased his contacts with the Greeks on the European continent by establishing relations with the city-state of Sparta.

In 550 BC, Croesus's brother-in-law, the Median king Astyages, was overthrown by his own grandson, the Persian king Cyrus the Great, and Croesus responded by attacking Pteria, the capital of a Phrygian state vassal to the Lydians which might have attempted to declare its allegiance to the new Persian Empire of Cyrus. Cyrus retaliated by intervening in Cappadocia and defeated the Lydians at Pteria in a battle, and again at Thymbra before besieging and capturing the Lydian capital of Sardis, thus bringing an end to the rule of the Mermnad dynasty and to the Lydian Empire. Lydia would never regain its independence and would remain a part of various successive empires.

Although the dates for the battles of Pteria and Thymbra and of end of the Lydian empire have been traditionally fixed to 547 BC, more recent estimates suggest that Herodotus's account being unreliable chronologically concerning the fall of Lydia means that there are currently no ways of dating the end of the Lydian kingdom; theoretically, it may even have taken place after the fall of Babylon in 539 BC.

=== Persian Empire ===
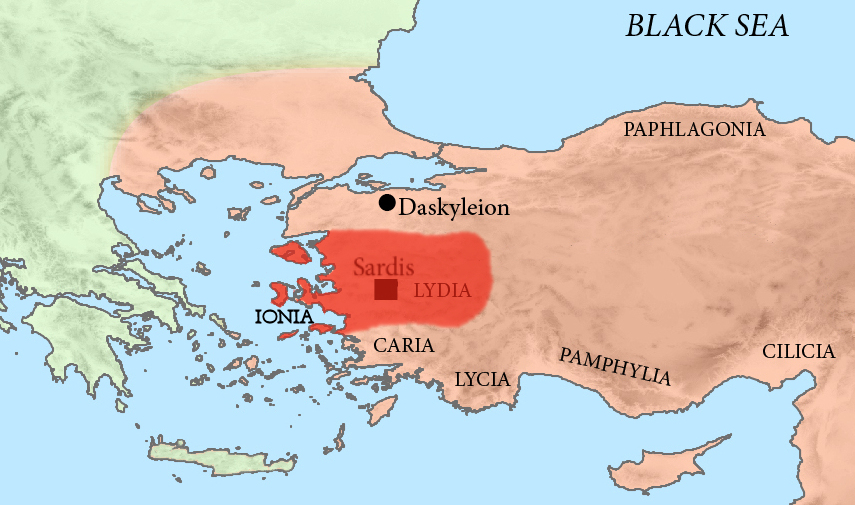
Lydia, including Ionia, during the Achaemenid Empire.

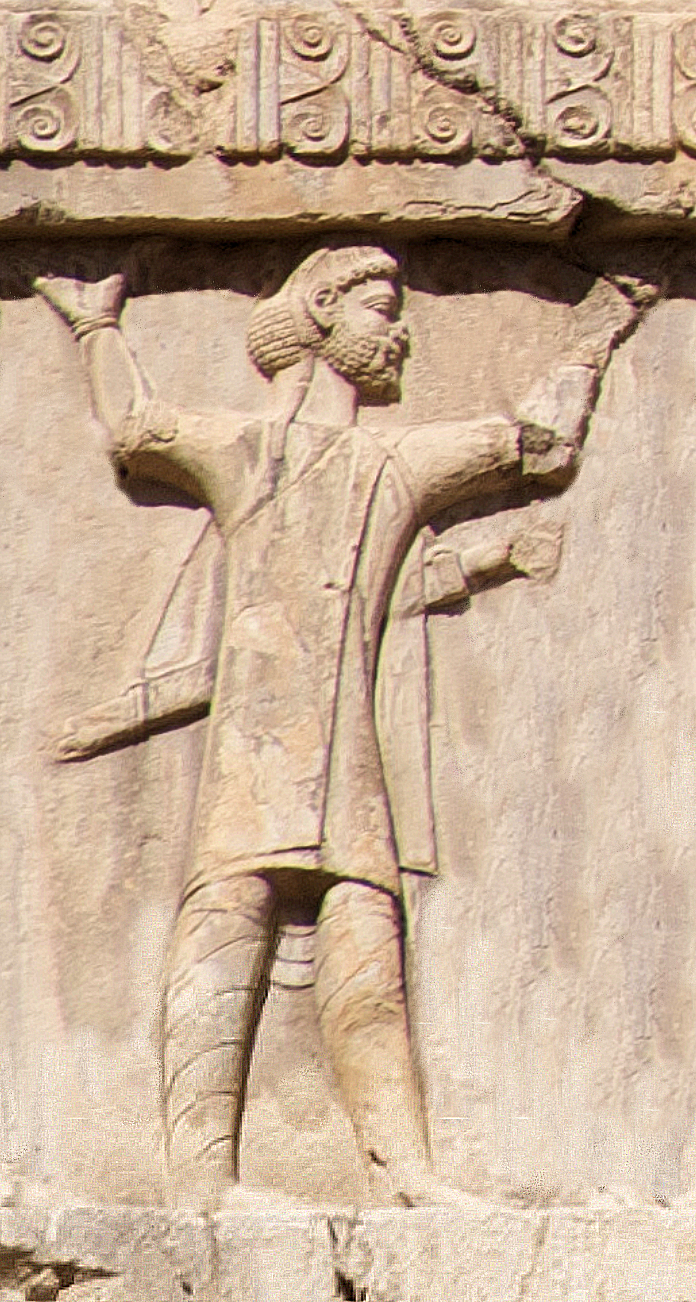
Xerxes I tomb, Lydian soldier of the Achaemenid army, circa 480 BC

In 547 BC, the Lydian king Croesus besieged and captured the Persian city of Pteria in Cappadocia and enslaved its inhabitants. The Persian king Cyrus The Great marched with his army against the Lydians. The Battle of Pteria resulted in a stalemate, forcing the Lydians to retreat to their capital city of Sardis. Some months later the Persian and Lydian kings met at the Battle of Thymbra. Cyrus won and captured the capital city of Sardis by 546 BC. Lydia became a province (satrapy) of the Persian Empire.

=== Hellenistic Empire ===
Lydia remained a satrapy after the invasion and conquest of Persia by Alexander the Great.

When Alexander's empire ended after his death, Lydia was possessed by the major Asian diadoch dynasty, the Seleucids, and when it was unable to maintain its territory in Asia Minor, Lydia was acquired by the Attalid dynasty of Pergamum. Its last king avoided the spoils and ravage of a Roman war of conquest by leaving the realm by testament to the Roman Empire.

=== Roman province of Asia ===
Roman province of Asia

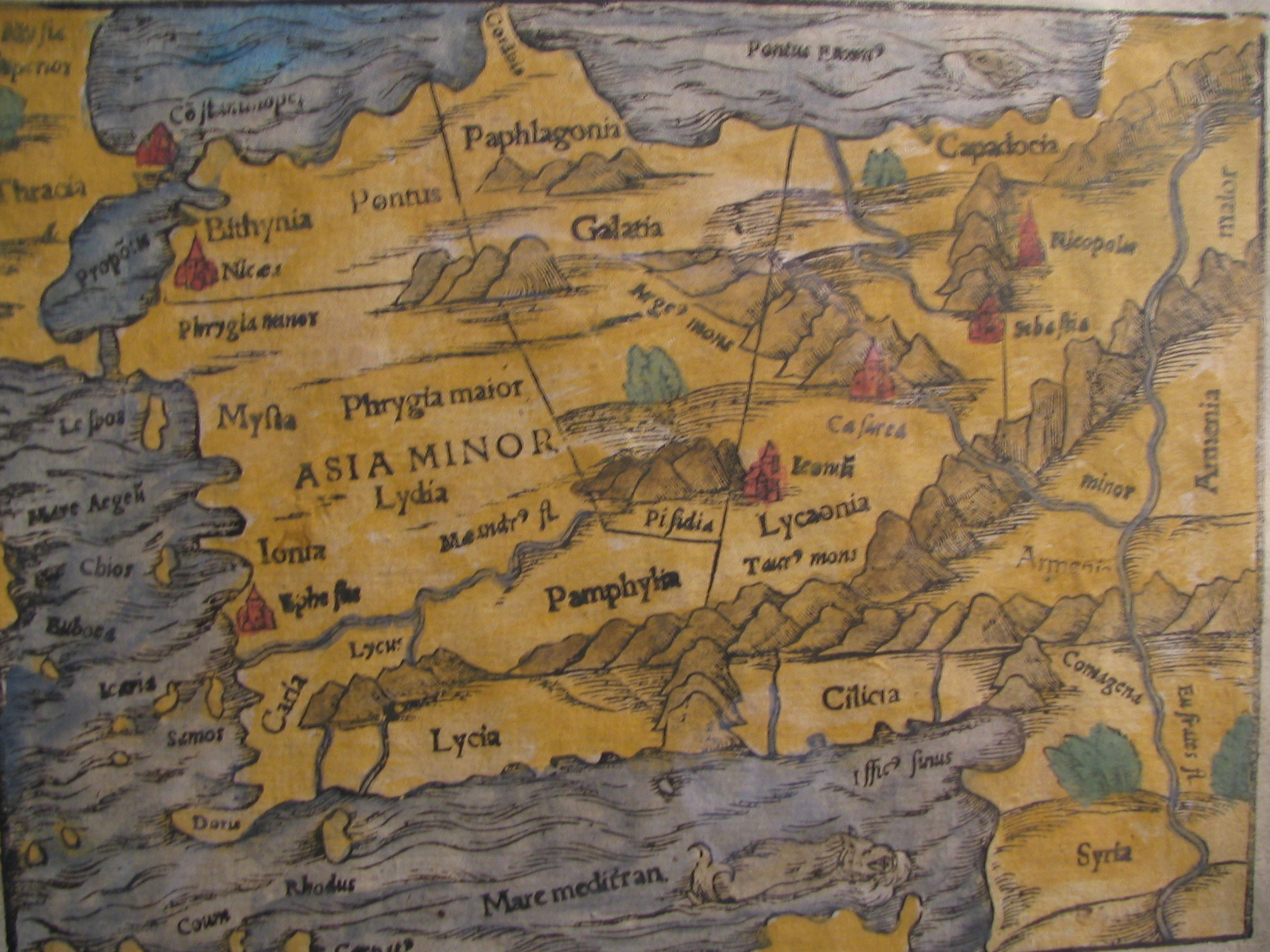
Photo of a 15th-century map showing Lydia

When the Romans entered the capital Sardis in 133 BC, Lydia, as the other western parts of the Attalid legacy, became part of the province of Asia, a very rich Roman province, worthy of a governor with the high rank of proconsul. The whole west of Asia Minor had Jewish colonies very early, and Christianity was also soon present there. Acts of the Apostles 16:14–15 mentions the baptism of a merchant woman called "Lydia" from Thyatira, known as Lydia of Thyatira, in what had once been the satrapy of Lydia. Christianity spread rapidly during the 3rd century CE, based on the nearby Exarchate of Ephesus.

=== Roman province of Lydia ===
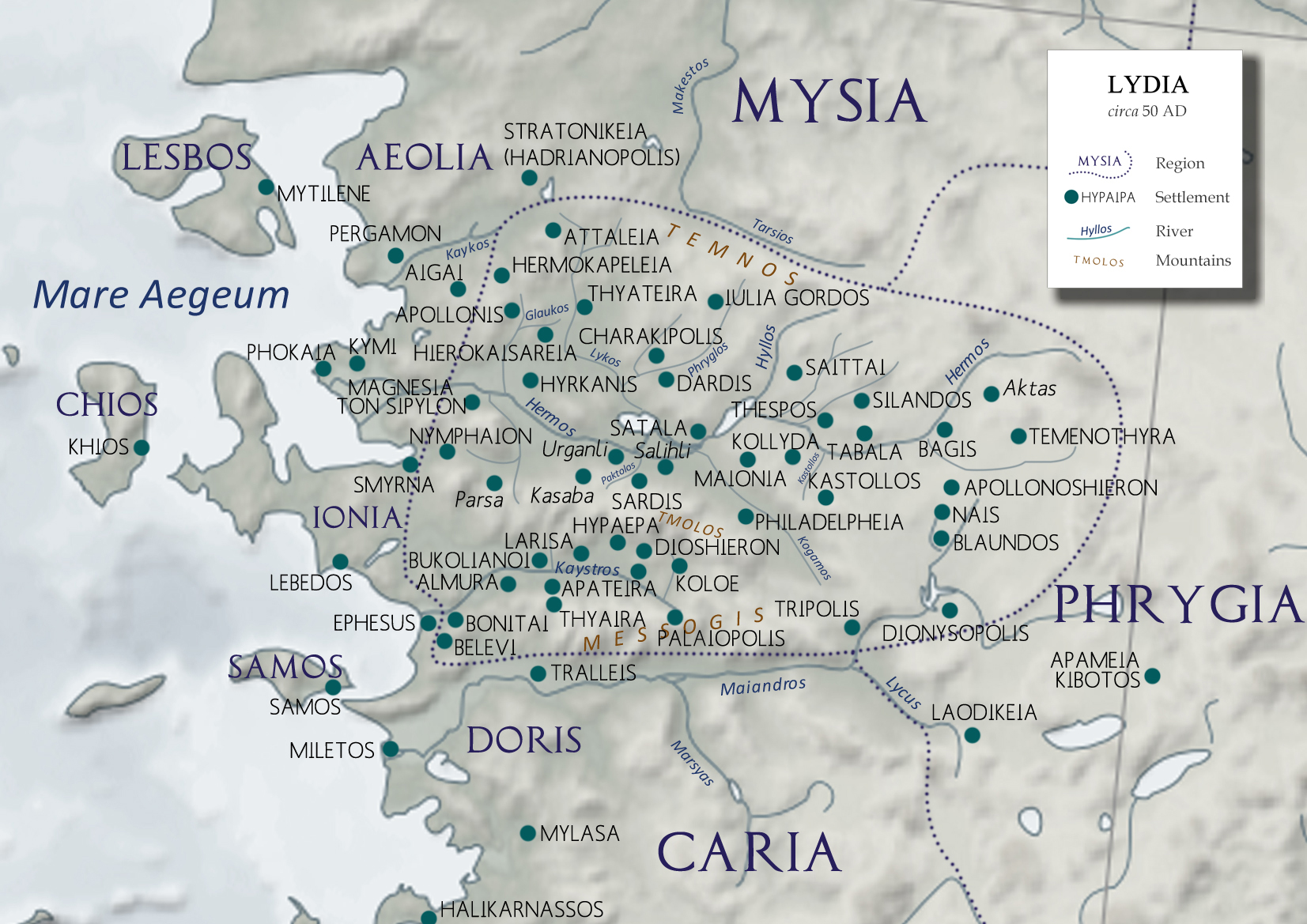
Lydia circa 50 AD

Under the tetrarchy reform of Emperor Diocletian in 296 CE, Lydia was revived as the name of a separate Roman province, much smaller than the former satrapy, with its capital at Sardis.

Together with the provinces of Caria, Hellespontus, Lycia, Pamphylia, Phrygia prima and Phrygia secunda, Pisidia (all in modern Turkey) and the Insulae (Ionian islands, mostly in modern Greece), it formed the diocese (under a vicarius) of Asiana, which was part of the praetorian prefecture of Oriens, together with the dioceses Pontiana (most of the rest of Asia Minor), Oriens proper (mainly Syria), Aegyptus (Egypt) and Thraciae (on the Balkans, roughly Bulgaria).

=== Eastern Roman Empire (and Crusader) age ===
Under the Eastern Roman emperor Heraclius (610–641), Lydia became part of Anatolikon, one of the original themata, and later of Thrakesion. Although the Seljuk Turks conquered most of the rest of Anatolia, forming the Sultanate of Ikonion (Konya), Lydia remained part of the Byzantine Empire. While the Venetians occupied Constantinople and Greece as a result of the Fourth Crusade, Lydia continued as a part of the Eastern Roman rump state called the Nicene Empire based at Nicaea until 1261.

=== Under Turkish rule ===
Lydia was captured finally by Turkish beyliks, which were absorbed by the Ottoman state in the 14th and 15th centuries. The area became part of the Ottoman Aidin Vilayet (province), and is now in the modern republic of Turkey.

=== Legacy ===
==== First coinage ====
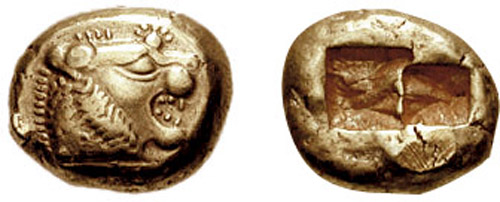
Early 6th century BC Lydian electrum coin (one-third stater denomination).

According to Herodotus, the Lydians were the first people to use gold and silver coins and the first to establish retail shops in permanent locations. It is not known, however, whether Herodotus meant that the Lydians were the first to use coins of pure gold and pure silver or the first precious metal coins in general. Despite this ambiguity, this statement of Herodotus is one of the pieces of evidence most often cited on behalf of the argument that Lydians invented coinage, at least in the West, although the first coins (under Alyattes I, reigned c.591–c.560 BC) were neither gold nor silver but an alloy of the two called electrum.

The dating of these first stamped coins is one of the most frequently debated topics of ancient numismatics, with dates ranging from 700 BC to 550 BC, but the most common opinion is that they were minted at or near the beginning of the reign of King Alyattes (sometimes referred to incorrectly as Alyattes II). The first coins were made of electrum, an alloy of gold and silver that occurs naturally but that was further debased by the Lydians with added silver and copper.

Croeseids

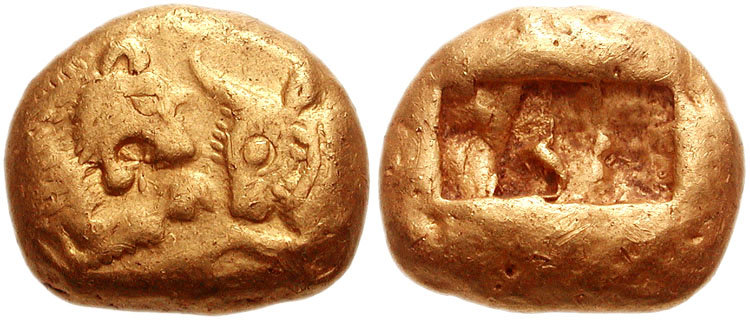
Gold Croeseid, minted by king Croesus circa 561–546 BC. (10.7 grams, Sardis mint).

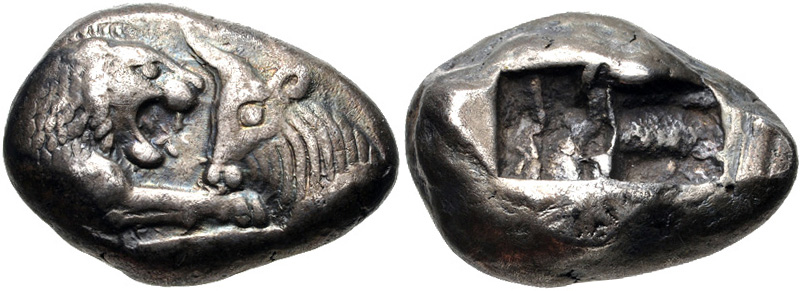
Silver Croeseid, minted by king Croesus, circa 560–546 BC (10.7 grams, Sardis mint)

The gold and silver Croeseids formed the world's first bimetallic monetary system circa 550 BC.

The largest of these coins are commonly referred to as a 1/3 stater (trite) denomination, weighing around 4.7 grams, though no full staters of this type have ever been found, and the 1/3 stater probably should be referred to more correctly as a stater, after a type of a transversely held scale, the weights used in such a scale (from ancient Greek ίστημι=to stand), which also means "standard." These coins were stamped with a lion's head adorned with what is likely a sunburst, which was the king's symbol. The most prolific mint for early electrum coins was Sardis which produced large quantities of the lion head thirds, sixths and twelfths along with lion paw fractions. To complement the largest denomination, fractions were made, including a hekte (sixth), hemihekte (twelfth), and so forth down to a 96th, with the 1/96 stater weighing only about 0.15 grams. There is disagreement, however, over whether the fractions below the twelfth are actually Lydian.

Alyattes' son was Croesus (Reigned c.560–c.546 BC), who became associated with great wealth. Croesus is credited with issuing the Croeseid, the first true gold coins with a standardised purity for general circulation, and the world's first bimetallic monetary system circa 550 BC.

It took some time before ancient coins were used for commerce and trade. Even the smallest-denomination electrum coins, perhaps worth about a day's subsistence, would have been too valuable for buying a loaf of bread. The first coins to be used for retailing on a large-scale basis were likely small silver fractions, Hemiobol, Ancient Greek coinage minted in Cyme (Aeolis) under Hermodike II then by the Ionian Greeks in the late sixth century BC.

Sardis was renowned as a beautiful city. Around 550 BC, near the beginning of his reign, Croesus paid for the construction of the temple of Artemis at Ephesus, which became one of the Seven Wonders of the ancient world. Croesus was defeated in battle by Cyrus II of Persia in 546 BC, with the Lydian kingdom losing its autonomy and becoming a Persian satrapy.

==== In Greek mythology ====
For the Greeks, Tantalus was a primordial ruler of mythic Lydia, and Niobe his proud daughter; her husband Amphion associated Lydia with Thebes in Greece, and through Pelops the line of Tantalus was part of the founding myths of Mycenae's second dynasty. (In reference to the myth of Bellerophon, Karl Kerenyi remarked, in The Heroes of The Greeks 1959, p. 83. "As Lykia was thus connected with Crete, and as the person of Pelops, the hero of Olympia, connected Lydia with the Peloponnesos, so Bellerophontes connected another Asian country, or rather two, Lykia and Karia, with the kingdom of Argos".)

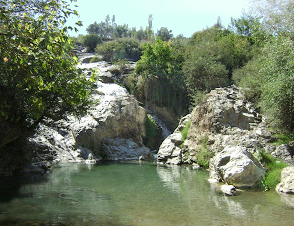
The Pactolus river, from which Lydia obtained electrum, a combination of silver and gold.

In Greek myth, Lydia had also adopted the double-axe symbol, that also appears in the Mycenaean civilization, the labrys. Omphale, daughter of Iardanos, was a princess of Lydia, whom Heracles was required to serve for a time. His adventures in Lydia are the adventures of a Greek hero in a peripheral and foreign land: during his stay, Heracles enslaved the Itones; killed Syleus, who forced passers-by to hoe his vineyard; slew the serpent of the river Sangarios (which appears in the heavens as the constellation Ophiucus) and captured the simian tricksters, the Cercopes. Accounts tell of at least one son of Heracles who was born to either Omphale or a slave-girl: Herodotus (Histories i. 7) says this was Alcaeus who began the line of Lydian Heracleidae which ended with the death of Candaules c. 687 BC. Diodorus Siculus (4.31.8) and Ovid (Heroides 9.54) mentions a son called Lamos, while pseudo-Apollodorus (Bibliotheke 2.7.8) gives the name Agelaus and Pausanias (2.21.3) names Tyrsenus as the son of Heracles by "the Lydian woman". All three heroic ancestors indicate a Lydian dynasty claiming Heracles as their ancestor. Herodotus (1.7) refers to a Heraclid dynasty of kings who ruled Lydia, yet were perhaps not descended from Omphale. He also mentions (1.94) the legend that the Etruscan civilization was founded by colonists from Lydia led by Tyrrhenus, brother of Lydus. Dionysius of Halicarnassus was skeptical of this story, indicating that the Etruscan language and customs were known to be totally dissimilar to those of the Lydians. In addition, the story of the "Lydian" origins of the Etruscans was not known to Xanthus of Lydia, an authority on the history of the Lydians.

Later chronologists ignored Herodotus' statement that Agron was the first Heraclid to be a king, and included his immediate forefathers Alcaeus, Belus, and Ninus in their list of kings of Lydia. Strabo (5.2.2) has Atys, father of Lydus and Tyrrhenus, as a descendant of Heracles and Omphale but that contradicts virtually all other accounts which name Atys, Lydus, and Tyrrhenus among the pre-Heraclid kings and princes of Lydia. The gold deposits in the river Pactolus that were the source of the proverbial wealth of Croesus (Lydia's last king) were said to have been left there when the legendary king Midas of Phrygia washed away the "Midas touch" in its waters. In Euripides' tragedy The Bacchae, Dionysus, while maintaining his human disguise, declares his country to be Lydia.

==== Lydians, the Tyrrhenians and the Etruscans ====
The relationship between the Etruscans of northern and central Italy and the Lydians has long been a subject of conjecture. The Greek historian Herodotus believed they came from Lydia, but Dionysius of Halicarnassus, a 1st-century BC historian, argued that the Etruscans were indigenous to Italy and unrelated to the Lydians. Dionysius pointed out that the 5th-century historian Xanthus of Lydia, who was regarded as an important source and authority for the history of Lydia, never linked the Etruscans to Lydia or mentioned Tyrrhenus as a Lydian ruler.

In contemporary scholarship, Etruscologists overwhelmingly support an indigenous origin for the Etruscans, dismissing Herodotus' account as based on erroneous etymologies. Michael Grant argue that the Etruscans may have propagated this narrative to facilitate their trading in Asia Minor, when many cities in Asia Minor, and the Etruscans themselves, were at war with the Greeks. The French scholar Dominique Briquel contends that "the story of an exodus from Lydia to Italy was a deliberate political fabrication created in the Hellenized milieu of the court at Sardis in the early 6th century BC." Ultimately, these Greek-authored accounts of the Etruscan origins are only the expression of the image that Etruscans' allies or adversaries wanted to divulge and should not be considered historical.

Archaeological evidence does not support the idea of Lydian migration to Etruria. The Etruscan civilization's earliest phase, the Villanovan culture, emerged around 900 BC, which itself developed from the previous Proto-Villanovan culture of Italy in the late Bronze Age. This culture has no ties to Asia Minor or the Near East. Linguists have identified an Etruscan-like language in a set of inscriptions on Lemnos island, in the Aegean Sea. Since the Etruscan language was a Pre-Indo-European language and neither Indo-European or Semitic, Etruscan was not related to Lydian, which was a part of the Anatolian branch of the Indo-European languages. Instead, Etruscan language is considered part of the pre-Indo-European Tyrrhenian language family, along with the Lemnian and Rhaetian language.

A 2013 genetic study suggested that the maternal lineages of western Anatolians and modern Tuscans had been largely separate for 5,000 to 10,000 years, with Etruscan mtDNA closely resembling modern Tuscans and Neolithic Central European populations. This suggests Etruscans descended from the Villanovan culture, indicating their indigenous roots, and a link between Etruria, modern Tuscany, and Lydia dating back to the Neolithic period during the migration of Early European Farmers from Anatolia to Europe. A 2019 genetic study revealed that Etruscans (900–600 BC) and Latins (900–500 BC) from Latium vetus shared genetic similarities, with both groups having a mixture of two-thirds Copper Age ancestry and one-third Steppe-related ancestry. This study also suggested indigenous origins for the Etruscans, despite their pre-Indo-European language.

A 2021 study confirmed these findings, showing that Etruscans and Latins in the Iron Age had similar genetic profiles and were part of the European cluster. The Etruscan DNA was completely absent a signal of recent admixture with Anatolia and the Eastern Mediterranean. Etruscans exhibited a blend of WHG, EEF, and Steppe ancestry, with 75% of males belonging to haplogroup R1b and the most common mitochondrial DNA haplogroup being H.

== Culture and society ==
=== Religion ===
==== Early Lydian religion ====
The Lydians in early Antiquity adhered to a religion which remains marginally attested due to the known sources covering it being largely of Greek origin, while Lydian inscriptions regarding religion are small in number and no Lydian corpus of ritual texts like the Hittite ritual tablets have been recovered.

Despite the small size of the recorded Lydian corpus, the various inscriptions relating to religion date from c. 650 to c. 330-325 BC, thus covering the period beginning with the establishment of the Mermnad dynasty under Gyges and ending with the aftermath of the Macedonian conquest under Alexander III and the beginning of the Hellenistic period. Based on limited evidence, Lydian religious practices were centred around the fertility of nature, as was common among ancient societies which depended on the successful cultivation of land.

The early Lydian religion exhibited strong connections to Anatolian as well as Greek traditions, and its pantheon was composed of native Lydian deities who were reflexes of earlier Aegean-Balkan ones, as well as Anatolian deities, the latter of whom held lesser roles.

Although Lydia had been conquered by the Achaemenid Empire in c. 547 BC, native Lydian traditions were not destroyed by Persian rule, and most Lydian inscriptions were written during this period.

The Lydian religion was polytheistic in nature and was composed of a number of deities:

- unlike traditionally Anatolian pantheons but similarly to the Phrygian one, the Lydian pantheon was headed by the goddess Artimus (𐤠𐤭𐤯𐤦𐤪𐤰𐤮), who was a deity of wild nature as well as the Lydian variant of an earlier Aegean-Balkan goddess whose other reflexes included the Greek Artemis (Ἄρτεμις) and the Phrygian Artimis: Artimus is the most well-attested Lydian deities both in the Lydian corpus and archaeologically;
- the identity of the figure of Qaλdãns or Qaλiyãns (𐤲𐤷𐤣𐤵𐤫𐤮) is still uncertain, and has been variously interpreted as the Lydian king of the gods, or a moon god who was the main masculine deity of the Lydian pantheon and the consort of Artimus, or the Lydian equivalent of the Greek god Apollo (Ἀπόλλων), or a high status or royal title. While Qλdãns was once thought to be a theonymic, and referring to Apollo, it has recently become known that a Lydian coin also mentions the name Qλdãns in its legend. Thus, the earlier interpretations as a deity should be revised.
- The Lydian equivalent of the Greek god Zeus (Ζεύς) and the Phrygian god Tiws was Lews (𐤩𐤤𐤥𐤮) or Lefs (𐤩𐤤𐤱𐤮): Unlike the Anatolian storm god Tarḫuntas, Lews held a less prominent role in the Lydian religion, although his role as the bringer of rain followed the tradition surrounding the Anatolian Tarḫuntas;
- the goddess Lamẽtrus (𐤩𐤠𐤪𐤶𐤯𐤭𐤰𐤮) was the Lydian reflex of an earlier Aegean-Balkan goddess whose Greek iteration was Dēmētēr (Δημήτηρ);
- the frenzy god Pakiš (𐤡𐤠𐤨𐤦𐤳) to whom was performed an orgiastic cult was also a Lydian variant of an older Aegean-Balkan god whose Greek reflex was Bakkhos (Βάκχος);
- the goddess Kufaws (𐤨𐤰𐤱𐤠𐤥𐤮) or Kuwaws (𐤨𐤰𐤥𐤠𐤥𐤮), referred by the Greeks as Kubēbē (Κυβήβη), was a young goddess of divine frenzy, as well as a prominent Lydian deity possessing an important temple in Sardis;
- the existence of the goddess Korē (Κόρη) is attested only during the Hellenistic and Roman periods, when the festival of Khrysanthina (Χρυσάνθινα) was celebrated at Sardis in her honour, and she appears to have had some vegetative aspects;
- the god Sãntas (𐤮𐤵𐤫𐤯𐤠𐤮), whose name corresponds to that of the Luwian Šandas (𔖶𔖖𔗎𔗏𔑶𔑯𔗔𔖶), might have been the consort of Kufaws;
  - accompanying Sãntas were several lesser demon-like figures called the Mariwdas (𐤪𐤠𐤭𐤦𐤥𐤣𐤠𐤮), who were the Lydian equivalent of the deities attested in Hieroglyphic Luwian inscriptions as the Marwainzi (𔖖𔗎𔗏𔘅𔖱𔗬𔓯𔖩𔓯𔖶);
- the goddess Maλiš (𐤪𐤠𐤷𐤦𐤳), who corresponded to the Anatolian goddess Maliya, attested in Hittite as ᴰMāliya (𒀭𒈠𒀀𒇷𒅀) and Lycian as Maliya (𐊎𐊀𐊍𐊆𐊊𐊀), possessed a vegetative aspect, being a goddess of vegetation, especially of wine and corn.

Because of a lack of evidence, little is known on the organisation of Lydian cults.

Due to the meagre evidence for Lydian religious spaces, little is known about their shapes, sizes, administration, and location: Lydian cultic spaces ranged from small places of worship to prestigious temples of the state cult which also had a political role, although the evidence for them dates from after the end of Lydian independence, while those from the Lydian empire are primarily known from Greek literature rather than from archaeological evidence.

The early Lydian religion possessed at least three cultic officiants, consisting of:

- kawes (𐤨𐤠𐤥𐤤𐤮), who were priests and priestesses;
- šiwraλmi- (𐤳𐤦𐤥𐤭𐤠𐤷𐤪𐤦-), who were involved in the cult of Artimus;
- armτas (𐤠𐤭𐤪𐤴𐤠𐤮), who might have been prophets.

In addition to these clerical offices, the religious role of the kings among other Anatolian peoples suggests that Lydian kings were also religious high functionaries who participated in the cult as a representative of divine power on earth and claimed their legitimacy to rule from the gods. Anatolian and Hellenistic Greek parallels also suggest that Lydian kings might have been deified after their deaths.

==== Christianity ====
Lydia later had numerous Christian communities and, after Christianity became the official religion of the Roman Empire in the 4th century, Lydia became one of the provinces of the Diocese of Asia in the Patriarchate of Constantinople.

The ecclesiastical province of Lydia had a metropolitan diocese at Sardis and suffragan dioceses for Philadelphia, Thyatira, Tripolis, Settae, Gordus, Tralles, Silandus, Maeonia, Apollonos Hierum, Mostene, Apollonias, Attalia, Hyrcania, Bage, Balandus, Hermocapella, Hierocaesarea, Acrassus, Dalda, Stratonicia, Cerasa, Gabala, Satala, Aureliopolis and Hellenopolis. Bishops from the various dioceses of Lydia were well represented at the Council of Nicaea in 325 and at the later ecumenical councils.

==== Judaism ====
The first Jews in Lydia were set up by Antiochus III in the wake of a revolt in Lydia and Phrygia from 209–204 BC and consisted of 2000 Jewish families who lived in military settlements in Lydia and Phrygia. Each of these families were given land where they would build a house and cultivate the rest as farmland, they would also be given a 10 year tax exemption and have their basic needs provided for them by the government to help them establish themselves. Once they were established, the Jews of Lydia were given special autonomy to practice Judaism and the Lydian settlements became the epicenter of Judaism across Asia Minor.

Lydia remained under the control of the Selucids until the Battle of Magnesia in 190 BC when it was given to king Eumenes of Pergamum. in 133 BC Attalus III bequeathed the kingdom to the Romans. With most information about Lydian Jews coming from the Roman Era, with many documents about the Jewish community in Sardis having been found. During this time the Jews still had the right to live according to Jewish law and be judged under Halachic Law. During this time every Jew in Lydia was expected to give 1/2 a shekel to the Second Temple, and this was controversial among the general population who resented the Jews sending money to a foreign power.

In the 1960s the ancient synagogue in Sardis was discovered.

== See also ==
- Ancient regions of Anatolia
- Digda
- List of Kings of Lydia
- List of satraps of Lydia
- Ludim

== Sources ==
- Braun, T. F. R. G. (1982). "The Greeks in Egypt". In Boardman, John; Hammond, N. G. L. (eds.). The Cambridge Ancient History. Vol. 3. Cambridge: Cambridge University Press. pp. 32–56. ISBN 978-0-521-23447-4.
- Bury, J. B.; Meiggs, Russell (1975) [first published 1900]. A History of Greece (Fourth ed.). London: MacMillan Press. ISBN 0-333-15492-4.
- Cook, J. M. (1988). "The Eastern Greeks". In Boardman, John; Hammond, N. G. L. (eds.). The Cambridge Ancient History. Vol. 3. Cambridge: Cambridge University Press. pp. 196–221. ISBN 978-0-521-23447-4.
- Diakonoff, I. M. (1985). "Media". In Gershevitch, Ilya (ed.). The Cambridge History of Iran. Vol. 2. Cambridge: Cambridge University Press. pp. 36–148. ISBN 978-0-521-20091-2.
- Grousset, René (1970). The Empire of the Steppes. Rutgers University Press. pp. 9. ISBN 0-8135-1304-9.
- Herodotus (1975) [first published 1954]. Burn, A. R.; de Sélincourt, Aubrey (eds.). The Histories. London: Penguin Books. ISBN 0-14-051260-8.
- Hutter, Manfred (2017). "Kubaba in the Hittite Empire and the Consequences for her Expansion to Western Anatolia". L'hittitologie aujourd'hui: Études sur l'Anatolie hittite et néo-hittite à l'occasion du centenaire de la naissance d'Emmanuel Laroche [Hittitology today: Studies on Hittite and Neo-Hittite Anatolia in Honor of Emmanuel Laroche's 100th Birthday]. Istanbul, Turkey: Institut français d'études anatoliennes. pp. 113–122. ISBN 978-2-362-45083-9.
- Ivantchik, Askold (1993). Les Cimmériens au Proche-Orient [The Cimmerians in the Near East] (PDF) (in French). Fribourg, Switzerland; Göttingen, Germany: Éditions Universitaires (Switzerland); Vandenhoeck & Ruprecht (Germany). ISBN 978-3-727-80876-0.
- Ivantchik, Askold (2006). Aruz, Joan; Farkas, Ann; Fino, Elisabetta Valtz (eds.). The Golden Deer of Eurasia: Perspectives on the Steppe Nomads of the Ancient World. New Haven, United States; New York City, United States; London, United Kingdom: The Metropolitan Museum of Art; Yale University Press. pp. 146–153. ISBN 978-1-588-39205-3.
- Mellink, M. (1991). "The Native Kingdoms of Anatolia". In Boardman, John; Edwards, I. E. S.; Hammond, N. G. L.; Sollberger, E.; Walker, C. B. F. (eds.). The Cambridge Ancient History. Vol. 3. Cambridge: Cambridge University Press. pp. 619–665. ISBN 978-1-139-05429-4.
- Neumann, G. [in German] (1990). "Lydien" [Lydia]. In Edzard, Dietz Otto; Calmeyer, P.; Postgate, J. N.; Röllig, W. [in German]; von Schuler, E. [in German]; von Soden, W.; Stol, M.; Wilhelm, G. (eds.). Reallexikon der Assyriologie und Vorderasiatischen Archäologie [Encyclopaedia of Ancient Near Eastern Studies] (in German). Vol. 7. Berlin, Germany; New York City, United States: Walter de Gruyter. pp. 184–186. ISBN 978-3-110-10437-0.
- Payne, Annick (2019). "Native Religious Traditions from a Lydian Perspective". In Blakely, Sandra; Collins, Billie Jean (eds.). Religious Convergence in the Ancient Mediterranean. Studies in Ancient Mediterranean Religions. Vol. 2. Atlanta, United States: Lockwood Press. pp. 231–248. ISBN 978-1-948-48816-7.
- Oreshko, Rostyslav (2021). "In Search of the Holy Cube Roots: Kubaba—Kubeleya—Κύβεβος—Kufaws and the Problem of Ethnocultural Contact in Early Iron Age Anatolia". In Bianconi, Michele (ed.). Linguistic and Cultural Interactions between Greece and Anatolia: In Search of the Golden Fleece. Leiden, Netherlands: Brill Publishers. pp. 131–166. ISBN 978-9-004-46159-8.
