= 520s BC =

Decade

This article concerns the period 529 BC – 520 BC.

== Events ==
- 529 BC—The Chinese state of Zhoulai is conquered by Wu.
- 528 BC—Gautama Buddha attains Enlightenment, and begins his ministry.
- 527 BC—Jain Tirthankara Mahavira attains Moksha, according to the Swetambara Tradition.
- 527 BC—Peisistratos a tyrant of Athens dies: his son Hippias inherits his power.
- 526 BC—Psammetichus III succeeds Amasis II as king of Egypt.
- 526 BC—King Liao of Wu ascends to power in the State of Wu in China during the Zhou dynasty.
- 525 BC—Cambyses II, ruler of Persia, conquers Egypt, defeating Psammetichus III. This is considered the end of the Twenty-sixth Dynasty, and the start of the Persian Twenty-seventh Dynasty.
- c. 525 BC—Coins start to have an image on two sides.
- c. 524 BC—In the Battle of Cumae, an army of Umbrians, Daunians, Etruscans, and others is defeated by the Greeks of Cumae, present-day Italy.
- 522 BC—Bardiya succeeds Cambyses II as ruler of Persia.
- 522 BC—Babylon rebels against Persian rule.
- 522 BC—Darius I succeeds Bardiya as ruler of Persia. He is the son of a government official.
- 521 BC—The Babylonian rebellion against Persian rule is suppressed.
- 520 BC—Dao becomes King of the Zhou dynasty of China but dies before the end of the year.
- 520 BC—Cleomenes I succeeds Anaxandridas as king of Sparta (approximate date).
- c. 520 BC—Darius I decrees that work on Jerusalem resume as per the decree of Cyrus the Great.
- c. 520 BC—Kore, from Chios(?), is made. It is now at Acropolis Museum, Athens.
- c. 520 BC—Sarcophagus, from Cerveteri is made. It is now at National Etruscan Museum, Rome (approximate date).
- 520 BC–510 BC—The Priam Painter makes "Women at a Fountain House", black-figure decoration on a hydria. It is now at Museum of Fine Arts, Boston.

== Births ==
- 525 BC—Aeschylus, author of Greek tragedies (d. 456 BC)
- c. 524 BC—Themistocles, archon of Athens (d. 459 BC)
- 522 BC—Pindar, Greek poet
- 521 BC—Leonidas I. King of Sparta
- 520 BC—Panini, Hindu Indian grammarian (d. 460 BC)

== Deaths ==
- July, 529 BC—Cyrus the Great, ruler of ancient Persia
- 528 BC—Anaximenes of Miletus, Greek philosopher (b. 585 BC)
- 527 BC—Peisistratos, Athenian tyrant
- 526 BC—Amasis II, Egyptian pharaoh
- 526 BC—Duke Zhao of Jin, ruler of the State of Jin
- 525 BC—Psammetichus III, the last Pharaoh of the Twenty-sixth Dynasty of Egypt
- 522 BC—Cambyses II, ruler of ancient Persia
- 522 BC — Polycrates, tyrant of Samos
- September, 522 BC—Bardiya, ruler of ancient Persia
