= Zikai =

Zikai (Wade–Giles: Tzu-k'ai) may refer to:

- Qidiao Kai or Zikai (子開; born 540 BC), disciple of Confucius
- Feng Zikai (豐子愷; 1898–1975), pioneering manhua artist
- Zikai (singer) (born 1997), Swedish singer-songwriter
