= 522nd =

522nd or 522d may refer to:

- 522d Special Operations Squadron (522 SOS), the Fireballs, a unit of the United States Air Force

== See also ==
- 522 (number)
- 522, the year 522 (DXXII) of the Julian calendar
- 522 BC
