= Qidiao Kai =

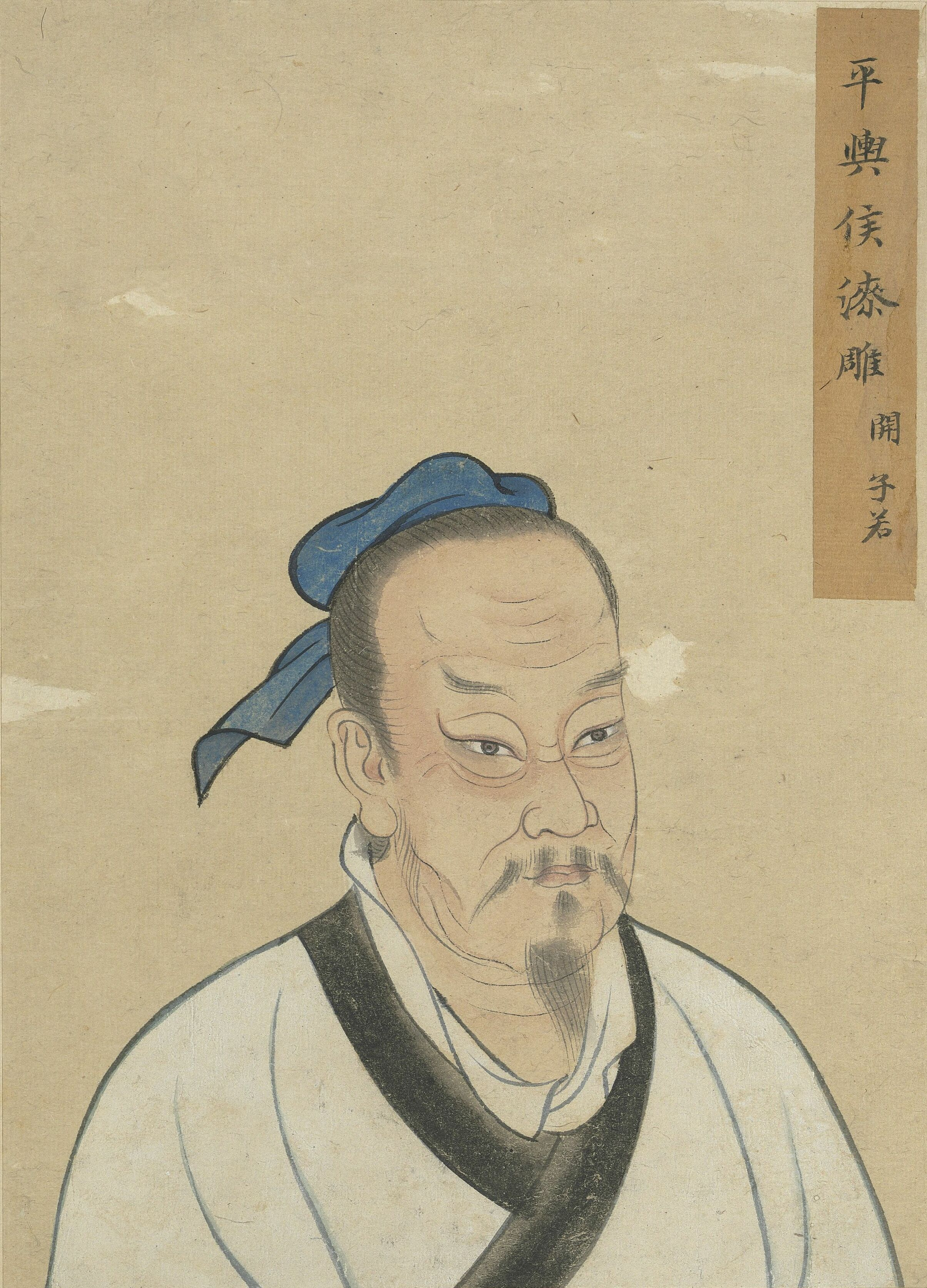
Yuan Dynasty depiction of Qidiao Kai

Qidiao Kai (Chinese: 漆雕開; Wade–Giles: Ch'i-tiao K'ai; born 540 BC), courtesy name Zikai (Chinese: 子開; Wade–Giles: Tzu-k'ai) or Ziruo (Chinese: 子若; Wade–Giles: Tzu-jo), was a major disciple of Confucius. He declined to take government office, but started his own school, which developed into one of the eight branches of Confucianism identified by Han Fei. His work, known as the Qidiaozi ("Master Qidiao"), has been lost.

== Life ==
Qidiao Kai was born in 540 BC, 11 years younger than Confucius. He was a native of the State of Cai. His original name was Qidiao Qi (漆雕啟), but the given name "Qi" was changed to the synonym "Kai" in Han dynasty texts because of the naming taboo of Liu Qi, Emperor Jing of Han. Two other members of his clan, Qidiao Chi (漆雕哆) and Qidiao Tufu (漆雕徒父), were also disciples of Confucius.

Qidiao Kai studied the Book of History from Confucius. In the Analects (5.6), Confucius asked him to become a government official, but Qidiao replied that he was not yet confident of his cultivation, and Confucius was pleased with his answer. There are several interpretations of this conversation. Confucius may have been pleased with his student's humility, with his disinterest in glory or government salary, or with Qidiao's assessment that the ruler at the time was not worth serving under.

Qidiao Kai later started his own school, which developed into one of the eight branches of Confucianism identified by Han Fei near the end of the 3rd century BC, but his doctrines are not known today. Yiwenzhi, the 1st-century imperial bibliography of the Book of Han, lists a 13-chapter book entitled the Qidiaozi ("Master Qidiao") attributed to Qidiao Kai, but it has since been lost.

== Honours ==
In Confucian temples, Qidiao Kai's spirit tablet is placed in the outer court, beyond those of the Four Assessors and Twelve Wise Ones, and next to that of Shang Qu.

During the Tang dynasty, Emperor Xuanzong posthumously awarded Qidiao Kai the nobility title of Count of Teng (滕伯). During the Song dynasty, Emperor Zhenzong further awarded him the title of Marquis of Pingyu (平輿侯).

== Bibliography ==
- Han, Zhaoqi (2010). "Biographies of the Disciples of Confucius". Shiji 史记 (in Chinese). Beijing: Zhonghua Book Company. ISBN 978-7-101-07272-3.
- Huang, Chichung, ed. (1997). The Analects of Confucius. Oxford University Press. ISBN 978-0-19-506157-4.
- Legge, James (2009). The Confucian Analects, the Great Learning & the Doctrine of the Mean. Cosimo. ISBN 978-1-60520-644-8.
- Shen, Vincent (2013). Dao Companion to Classical Confucian Philosophy. Springer Science & Business Media. ISBN 978-90-481-2936-2.
- Slingerland, Edward (2003). Analects: With Selections from Traditional Commentaries. Hackett Publishing. ISBN 1-60384-345-0.
