= 525 BC =

525 BC in various calendars
- Gregorian calendar: 525 BC; DXXV BC
- Ab urbe condita: 229
- Ancient Egypt era: XXVII dynasty, 1
- Pharaoh: Cambyses II of Persia, 1
- Ancient Greek Olympiad (summer): 63rd Olympiad, year 4
- Assyrian calendar: 4226
- Balinese saka calendar: N/A
- Bengali calendar: −1118 – −1117
- Berber calendar: 426
- Buddhist calendar: 20
- Burmese calendar: −1162
- Byzantine calendar: 4984–4985
- Chinese calendar: 乙亥年 (Wood Pig); 2173 or 1966 — to — 丙子年 (Fire Rat); 2174 or 1967
- Coptic calendar: −808 – −807
- Discordian calendar: 642
- Ethiopian calendar: −532 – −531
- Hebrew calendar: 3236–3237
- Hindu calendars
- Vikram Samvat: −468 – −467
- Shaka Samvat: N/A
- Kali Yuga: 2576–2577
- Holocene calendar: 9476
- Iranian calendar: 1146 BP – 1145 BP
- Islamic calendar: 1181 BH – 1180 BH
- Javanese calendar: N/A
- Julian calendar: N/A
- Korean calendar: 1809
- Minguo calendar: 2436 before ROC 民前2436年
- Nanakshahi calendar: −1992
- Thai solar calendar: 18–19
- Tibetan calendar: ཤིང་མོ་ཕག་ལོ་ (female Wood-Boar) −398 or −779 or −1551 — to — མེ་ཕོ་བྱི་བ་ལོ་ (male Fire-Rat) −397 or −778 or −1550

The year 525 BC was a year of the pre-Julian Roman calendar. In the Roman Empire, it was known as year 229 Ab urbe condita. The denomination 525 BC for this year has been used since the early medieval period, when the Anno Domini calendar era became the prevalent method in Europe for naming years.

== Events ==
=== By place ===
==== Egypt ====
- Battle of Pelusium - Cambyses II of Persia conquers Egypt by painting cats and other animals sacred to the Egyptians on his soldiers' shields. The Egyptians run in fear of "harming" these animals. It is said that after the battle, Cambyses hurled cats in the faces of the Egyptians in scorn that they would sacrifice their country for the safety of their animals.
- Cambyses takes Psamtik III prisoner and treats him kindly until he tries to raise a revolt, at which point Psamtik is executed.
- The Twenty-sixth Dynasty ends, and the Twenty-seventh Dynasty begins.

Somalia

- After conquering Egypt, the Persian king Cambyses II sent ambassadors to Macrobia, bringing luxury gifts for the Macrobian king to entice his submission. The Macrobian king replied instead with a challenge for his Persian counterpart in the form of an unstrung bow: if the Persians could manage to string it, they would have the right to invade his country; but until then, they should thank the gods that the Macrobians never decided to invade their empire.

== Astronomy ==
- September 17 - Venus occults Antares. The next such occurrence will not take place until November 17, 2400 AD.

== Births ==
- Aeschylus, author of Greek tragedies

== Deaths ==
- Psammetichus III, Egyptian pharaoh
- Anaximenes of Miletus, Greek scientist and philosopher (b. 585 BC)
