= 522 BC =

Calendar year

522 BC in various calendars
- Gregorian calendar: 522 BC; DXXII BC
- Ab urbe condita: 232
- Ancient Egypt era: XXVII dynasty, 4
- Pharaoh: Cambyses II of Persia, 4
- Ancient Greek Olympiad (summer): 64th Olympiad, year 3
- Assyrian calendar: 4229
- Balinese saka calendar: N/A
- Bengali calendar: −1115 – −1114
- Berber calendar: 429
- Buddhist calendar: 23
- Burmese calendar: −1159
- Byzantine calendar: 4987–4988
- Chinese calendar: 戊寅年 (Earth Tiger); 2176 or 1969 — to — 己卯年 (Earth Rabbit); 2177 or 1970
- Coptic calendar: −805 – −804
- Discordian calendar: 645
- Ethiopian calendar: −529 – −528
- Hebrew calendar: 3239–3240
- Hindu calendars
- Vikram Samvat: −465 – −464
- Shaka Samvat: N/A
- Kali Yuga: 2579–2580
- Holocene calendar: 9479
- Iranian calendar: 1143 BP – 1142 BP
- Islamic calendar: 1178 BH – 1177 BH
- Javanese calendar: N/A
- Julian calendar: N/A
- Korean calendar: 1812
- Minguo calendar: 2433 before ROC 民前2433年
- Nanakshahi calendar: −1989
- Thai solar calendar: 21–22
- Tibetan calendar: ས་ཕོ་སྟག་ལོ་ (male Earth-Tiger) −395 or −776 or −1548 — to — ས་མོ་ཡོས་ལོ་ (female Earth-Hare) −394 or −775 or −1547

The year 522 BC was a year of the pre-Julian Roman calendar. In the Roman Empire, it was known as year 232 Ab urbe condita. The denomination 522 BC for this year has been used since the early medieval period, when the Anno Domini calendar era became the prevalent method in Europe for naming years.

== Events ==
=== By place ===
==== Persian Empire ====
- Bardiya succeeds Cambyses II as ruler of Persia.
- Babylon rebels against Persian rule.
- December – Darius I succeeds Bardiya as ruler of Persia. He is the son of a government official.

== Births ==
- Pindar, Greek poet
- Ran Qiu, leading disciple of Confucius
- Ran Yong, leading disciple of Confucius
- Shang Qu, disciple of Confucius
- Zai Yu, leading disciple of Confucius

== Deaths ==
- July – Cambyses II, ruler of ancient Persia
- 29 September – Bardiya, ruler of ancient Persia
- Polycrates, tyrant of Samos
- Zichan, statesman of the State of Zheng
