= Shang Qu =

5th-century BC disciple of Confucius

Shang Qu (Chinese: 商瞿; Wade–Giles: Shang Ch'ü; born 522 BC), courtesy name Zimu (Chinese: 子木; Wade–Giles: Tzu-mu), was a disciple of Confucius. He studied the I Ching from Confucius, and is credited with the preservation and transmission of the classic.

== Life ==
Shang Qu was born in 522 BC, 29 years younger than Confucius. He was born in the State of Lu, Confucius' native state. According to the Shiben, he was a descendant of the Shang dynasty nobility, hence his surname Shang.

According to the Records of the Grand Historian (Shiji), Shang Qu was responsible for the preservation of the I Ching, which he received from Confucius. The Shiji records the transmission of the I Ching, step by step, from Shang Qu to his disciple Han Bi (馯臂), down to Yang He (杨何) of the Han dynasty. Yang He served as an official in the court of Emperor Wu of Han (reigned 156–87 BC) because of his knowledge of the I Ching.

== Legends ==
Little is known about Shang Qu's life, but several legends have later developed about him. According to one legend, Shang Qu did not have a son when he approached the age of 40. His mother was worried, but Confucius told her that Shang Qu would have five sons after turning 40, which became true.

In another legend, Shang Qu performed divination which predicted that Confucius would die at noon of that day. Upon hearing this, Confucius asked his disciples to bring his books, so he could read until noon.

== Honours ==
In Confucian temples, Shang Qu's spirit tablet is placed in the outer court, beyond those of the Four Assessors and Twelve Wise Ones, and after that of Nangong Kuo.

During the Tang dynasty, Emperor Xuanzong posthumously awarded Shang Qu the nobility title of Count of Meng (蒙伯). During the Song dynasty, Emperor Zhenzong further awarded him the title of Marquis of Xuchang (須昌侯).

== Bibliography ==
- Han, Zhaoqi (2010). "Biographies of the Disciples of Confucius". Shiji 史记 (in Chinese). Beijing: Zhonghua Book Company. ISBN 978-7-101-07272-3.
- Legge, James (2009). The Confucian Analects, the Great Learning & the Doctrine of the Mean. Cosimo. ISBN 978-1-60520-644-8.
