= Battle of Cumae (524 BC) =

Battle between Cumae and the Etruscans

Date	524 BC
Location	the countryside surrounding Cumae
Result	Cumaean victory

Belligerents
Cumae	Etruscans; Umbrians; Daunians

The Battle of Cumae of 524 BC was a victory for the Greek city-state of Cumae over an invading force of Etruscans, Umbrians, Daunians and others.

Cumae was the first Greek colony in Italy, founded around 770 BC. The Etruscans established a competing colony at nearby Capua. The invasion of 524 was meant to eliminate Cumae as an economic rival to Capua. The Greeks, however, "maneuvered the invaders into the lowlands and swampy area" where they were able to destroy them.

The Battle of Cumae is reported in Dionysius of Halicarnassus's Roman Antiquities, Book VII, in a passage that may go back to a lost 'Cumaean chronicle'. Dionysius dates the battle to "the sixty-fourth Olympiad, when Miltiades was archon at Athens", which corresponds to 524–523 BC. He attributes the rise of Aristodemus Malacus to the bravery he displayed in the battle.
