= Greece =

Country in Southeastern Europe

Hellenic Republic Ελληνική Δημοκρατία (Greek) Hellinikí Dimokratía
- Flag Coat of arms
- Motto: Ελευθερία ή Θάνατος; Elefthería í Thánatos ("Freedom or Death")
- Anthem: Ύμνος εις την Ελευθερίαν; Hýmnos eis tin Eleftherían ("Hymn to Liberty")
- Location of Greece (dark green) – in Europe (light green & dark grey) – in the European Union (light green)
- Capital and largest city: Athens; 37°58′N 23°43′E
- Official language: Greek
- Religion (2017): 93% Christianity; 90% Greek Orthodoxy (official) (Note: Eastern Orthodoxy is recognised by the Greek Constitution as the prevailing religion in Greece, the only country in the world where Eastern Orthodoxy is clearly recognised as a state religion.); 3% other Christian; 4% no religion; 2% Islam; 1% other
- Demonyms: Greek; Hellene
- Government: Unitary parliamentary republic
  - President: Konstantinos Tasoulas
  - Prime Minister: Kyriakos Mitsotakis
  - President of the Parliament: Nikitas Kaklamanis
- Legislature: Hellenic Parliament

Establishment history
  - Greek War of Independence against the Ottoman Empire: 25 March 1821 (traditional starting date)
  - Official declaration: 1 January 1822
  - Recognition: 3 February 1830
  - Third Hellenic Republic: 24 July 1974
  - Current constitution: 11 June 1975

Area
  - Total: 131,957 km^{2} (50,949 sq mi) (95th)
  - Water (%): 1.51 (2015)

Population
  - 2025 estimate: ▼10,372,335 (1 January 2025) (90th)
  - 2021 census: ▼10,432,481
  - Density: 78.9/km^{2} (204.4/sq mi) (136th)
- GDP (PPP): 2026 estimate
  - Total: ▲$490.550 billion (54th)
  - Per capita: ▲$47,365 (49th)
- GDP (nominal): 2026 estimate
  - Total: ▲$304.627 billion (51st)
  - Per capita: ▲$29,413 (44th)
- Gini (2025): ▼31.6 medium inequality
- HDI (2023): ▲0.908 very high (34th)
- Currency: Euro (€) (EUR)
- Time zone: UTC+02:00 (EET)
  - Summer (DST): UTC+03:00 (EEST)
- Calling code: +30
- ISO 3166 code: GR
- Internet TLD: .gr; .ελ (Note: The .eu domain is also used, shared with other European Union member states.)

Greece, (Note: Greek: Ελλάδα, romanised: Helláda, IPA: [eˈlaða]; also Ελλάς (Hellás) [eˈlas].) officially the Hellenic Republic, (Note: Greek: Ελληνική Δημοκρατία, romanised: Hellinikí Dimokratía, IPA: [eliniˈci ðimokraˈti.a].) is a country located mostly on the Balkan peninsula of Southeastern Europe, with thousands of islands extending geographically to Asia Minor. It has a population of around 10 million. With nine regions and up to 227 inhabited islands, it has the longest coastline on the Mediterranean basin. The Ionian Sea is west of the mainland, Albania northwest, and North Macedonia and Bulgaria north. Turkey is east both by land and the Aegean Sea. The capital, Athens, is the largest Greek city, followed by Thessaloniki and Patras.

At the crossroads of Europe, Asia and Africa, Greece is often considered the cradle of Western civilisation, Western philosophy, and Western literature, but also had a profound influence on the Eastern world, including on Egypt, Iran, Anatolia, India, and later on the Islamic world. Through the Ancient Greeks, Greece is the birthplace of democracy, historiography, political science, major scientific and mathematical principles, theatre, and the Olympic Games. The Ancient Greeks were organised into independent city-states, or poleis (sing. polis), that spanned the Mediterranean and Black seas. Philip II of Macedon united most of present-day Greece in the fourth century BC, with his son Alexander the Great conquering much of the known ancient world from the Near East to northwestern India. The subsequent Hellenistic period saw the height of Greek culture and influence in antiquity. Greece was annexed by Rome in the second century BC and became an integral part of the Roman Empire and its continuation, the Byzantine Empire, where Greek culture and language were dominant. The Greek Orthodox Church helped shape modern Greek identity and transmitted Greek traditions to the wider Orthodox world.

After the Fourth Crusade in 1204, Greece and the rest of the Byzantine empire were fragmented into several Latin and Byzantine successor polities, with most Greek lands finally coming under Ottoman control by the mid-15th century. Following a protracted war of independence in 1821, Greece emerged as a modern nation state in 1830, but was challenged by most Greeks living outside its borders. The Kingdom of Greece pursued territorial expansion during the Balkan Wars (1912–1913) and World War I (1914–1918), until its defeat in the Greco-Turkish War in 1922. A short-lived republic was established in 1924 but faced civil strife and the challenge of resettling refugees from Turkey, culminating in a royalist dictatorship in 1936. Greece endured military occupation during World War II, the subsequent Greek Civil War, and prolonged political instability, leading to a military dictatorship in 1967. The country began transitioning to democracy in 1974, leading to the current parliamentary republic.

Owing to record economic growth from 1950 to 1973, Greece is a developed country with an advanced high-income economy and a high standard of living. Shipping and tourism are major economic sectors, with Greece being the ninth most-visited country in 2024. Greece is part of multiple international organisations and forums, being the tenth member to join what is today the European Union in 1981. The country's rich historical legacy is reflected partly by its 21 UNESCO World Heritage Sites.

== Name ==
The native name of the country in Modern Greek is Ελλάδα (Elláda, pronounced [eˈlaða]). The corresponding form in Ancient Greek and conservative formal Modern Greek (Katharevousa) is Ἑλλάς (Hellas, classical: [hel.lás], modern: [eˈlas]). This is the source of the English alternative name Hellas, which is mostly found in archaic or poetic contexts today. The Greek adjectival form ελληνικός (ellinikos, [eliniˈkos]) is sometimes also translated as Hellenic and is often rendered in this way in the formal names of Greek institutions, as in the official name of the Greek state, the Hellenic Republic (Ελληνική Δημοκρατία, [eliniˈci ðimokraˈti.a]).

The English names Greece and Greek are derived, via the Latin Graecia and Graecus, from the name of the Graeci (Γραικοί, Graikoí), one of the first ancient Greek tribes to settle Magna Graecia in southern Italy.

== History ==
=== Prehistory and Aegean civilisations ===
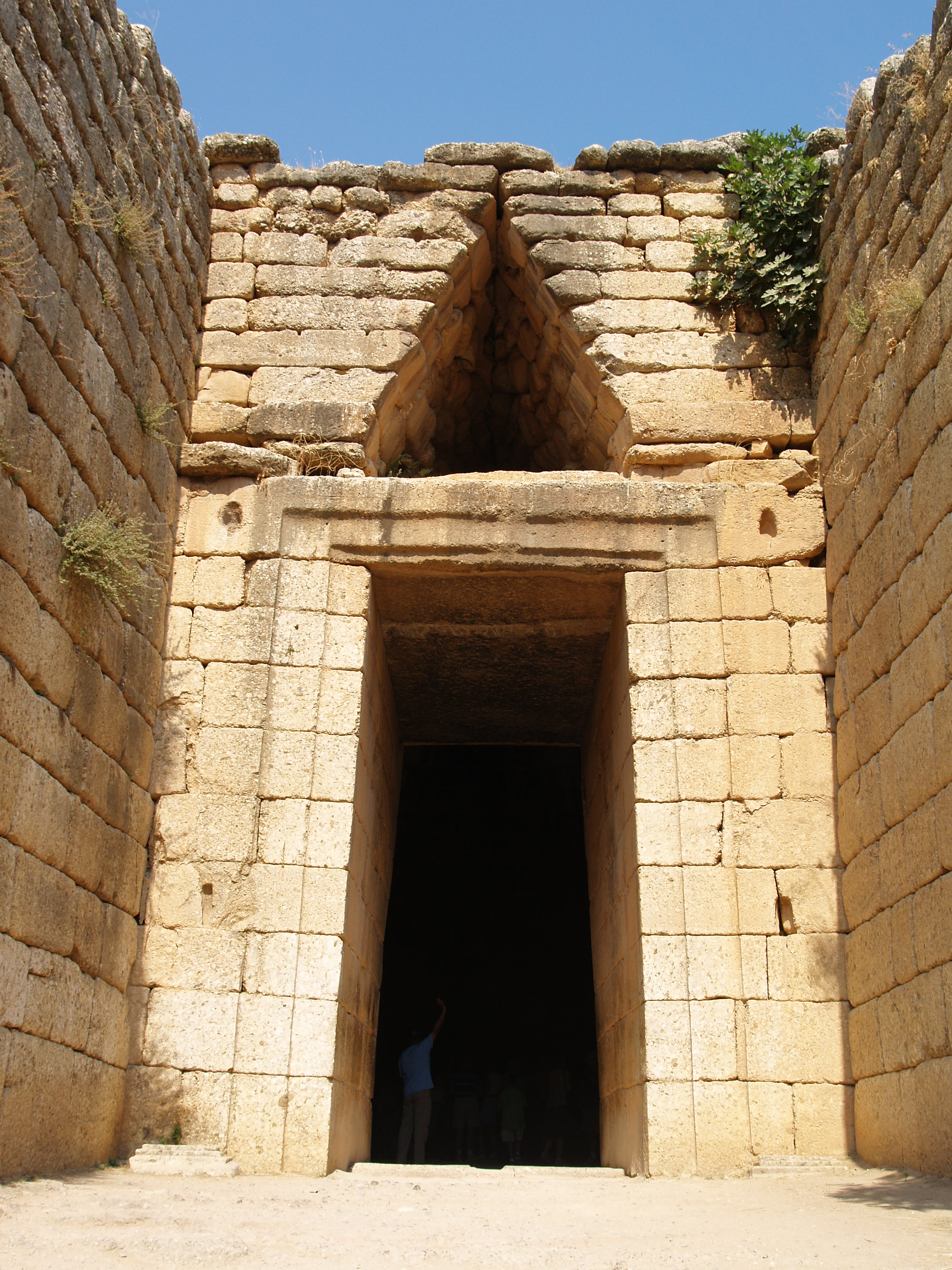
The entrance of the "Treasury of Atreus" (13th century BC) in Mycenae

The Apidima Cave in Mani, in southern Greece, has been suggested to contain the oldest remains of early modern humans outside of Africa, dated to 200,000 years ago. However others suggest the remains represent archaic humans. All three stages of the Stone Age are represented in Greece, for example in the Franchthi Cave. Neolithic settlements in Greece, dating from the 7th millennium BC, are the oldest in Europe, as Greece lies on the route by which farming spread from the Near East to Europe.

Greece is home to the first advanced civilisations in Europe and is often considered the birthplace of Western civilisation. The earliest of them was the Cycladic culture which flourished on the islands of the Aegean Sea, starting around 3200 BC, and produced an abundance of folded-arm and other marble figurines. From c. 3100 BC to 1100 BC, Crete, a major cultural and economic centre, was home to the Minoan civilisation known for its colourful art, religious figurines, and monumental palaces. The Minoans wrote their undeciphered language using scripts known as Linear A and Cretan hieroglyphs. On the mainland, the Mycenaean civilisation developed around 1750 BC and lasted until c. 1100 BC. The Mycenaeans possessed an advanced military and built large fortifications. They worshipped many gods and used Linear B to write the earliest attested form of Greek known as Mycenaean Greek.

=== Ancient Greece ===
Approximate location of Greek territories and colonies during the Archaic period (750–550 BC)

The collapse of the Mycenaean civilisation ushered in the Greek Dark Ages, from which written records are absent. The end of the Dark Ages is traditionally dated to 776 BC, the year of the first Olympic Games. The Iliad and the Odyssey, the foundational texts of Western literature, are believed to have been composed by Homer in the 7th or 8th centuries BC. Poetry shaped beliefs to the Olympian gods, but ancient Greek religion had no priestly class or systematic dogmas and encompassed other currents, such as popular cults, like that of Dionysus, mysteries and magic. At this time, many kingdoms and city-states emerged across the Greek peninsula, some of which went on to establish a number of colonies in Asia Minor, the shores of the Black Sea, and southern Italy (also known as Magna Grecia). The Greek city-states reached great prosperity that resulted in an unprecedented cultural boom, that of classical Greece, expressed in architecture, drama, science, mathematics and philosophy. In 508 BC, Cleisthenes instituted the world's first democratic system of government in Athens.

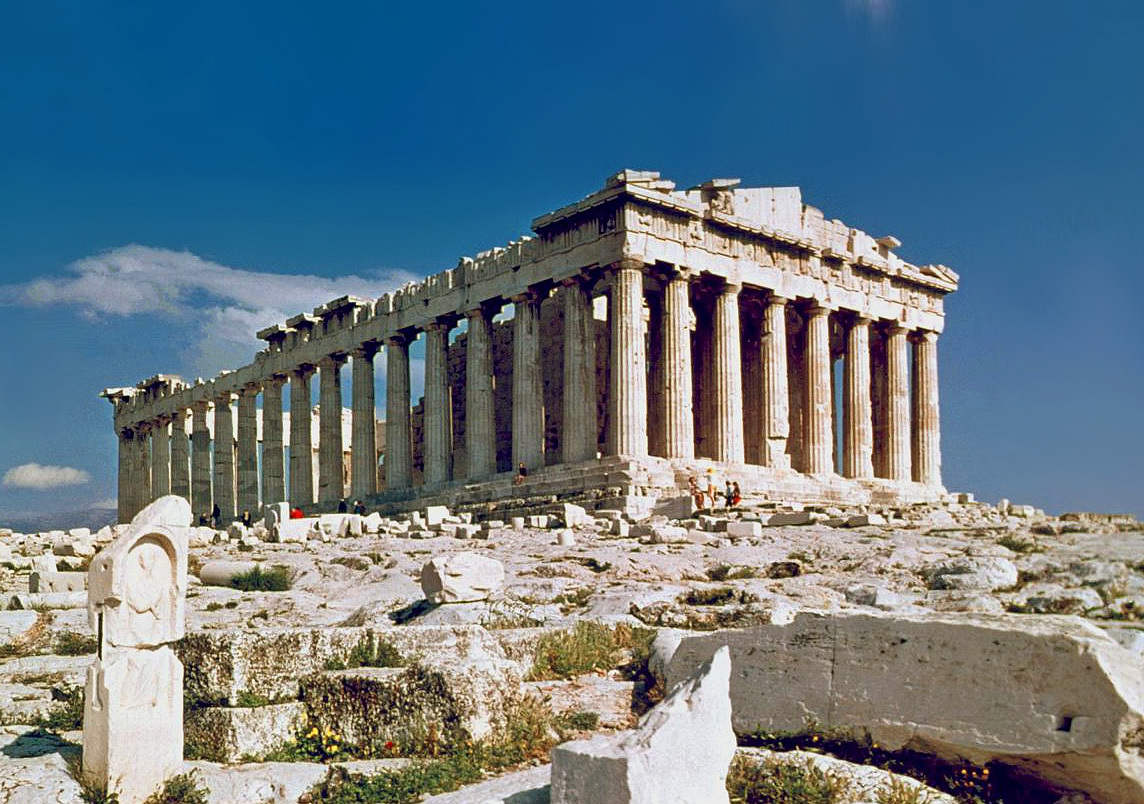
The Parthenon on the Acropolis of Athens, icon of classical Greece

By 500 BC, the Persian Empire controlled the Greek city states in Asia Minor and Macedonia. Attempts by Greek city-states of Asia Minor to overthrow Persian rule failed, and Persia invaded the states of mainland Greece in 492 BC, but was forced to withdraw after defeat by Athens at the Battle of Marathon in 490 BC. In response, a number of Greek city-states formed the Hellenic League in 481 BC, led by Sparta, which was the first recorded union of Greek states since the mythical union of the Trojan War. After the death of Leonidas at the battle of Thermopylae, during the second Persian invasion of Greece, the Achaemenid navy was decisively defeated in 480 BC at Salamis by an allied Greek navy led by Themistocles, and the Achaemenid army was finally defeated at Plataea in 479 BC, marking the eventual withdrawal of the Persians from all their European territories. The Greek victories in the Greco-Persian Wars are a pivotal moment in history, as the 50 years of peace afterwards are known as the Golden Age of Athens, a seminal period that laid many foundations of Western civilisation. Lack of political unity resulted in frequent conflict between Greek states. The most devastating intra-Greek war was the Peloponnesian War (431–404 BC), which marked the demise of the Athenian Empire and the emergence of Spartan and later Theban hegemony. Weakened by constant wars among them during the 4th century BC, the Greek poleis were subjugated to the rising power of the Argead kingdom of Macedon under king Philip II into an alliance known as the Hellenic League.

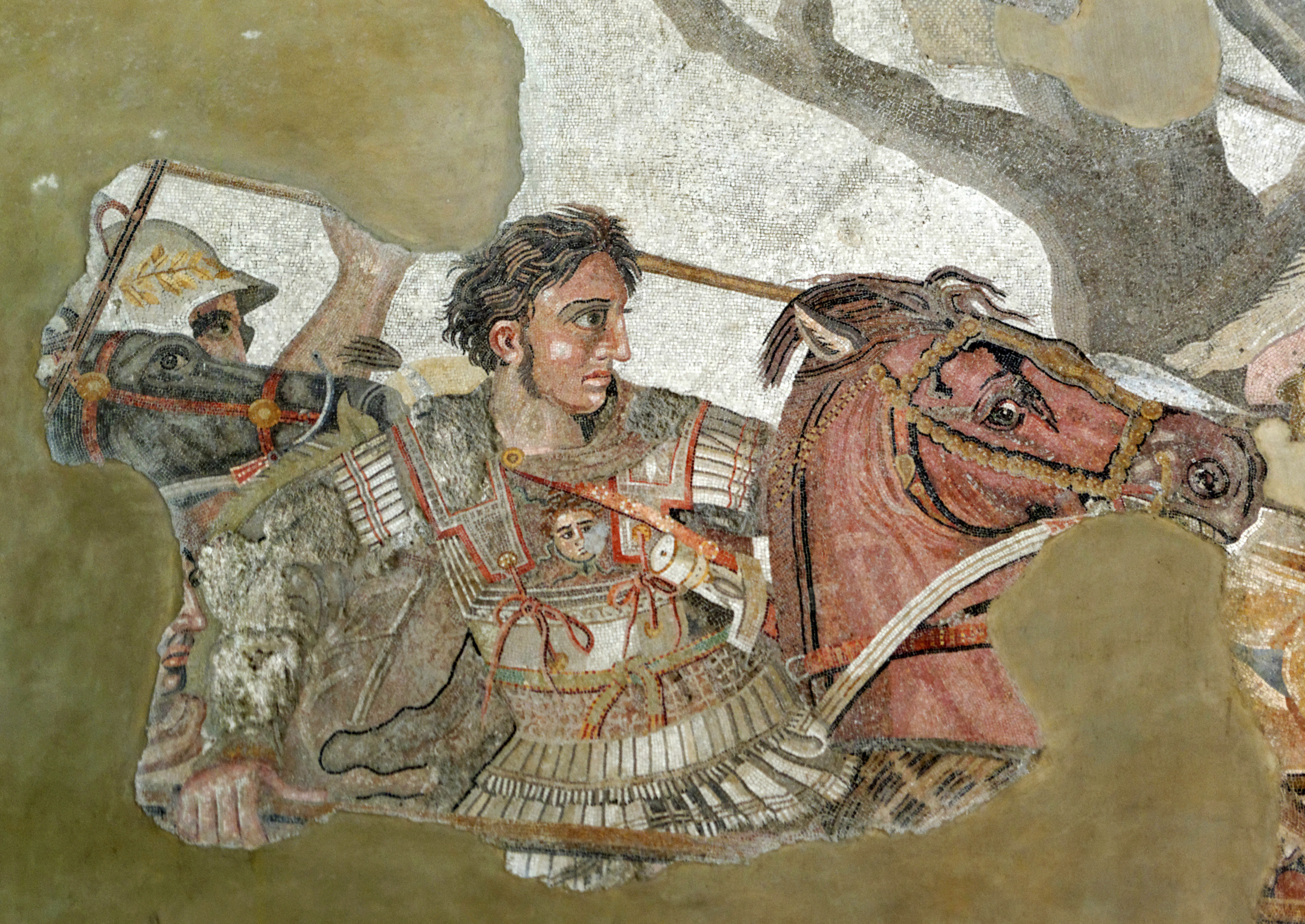
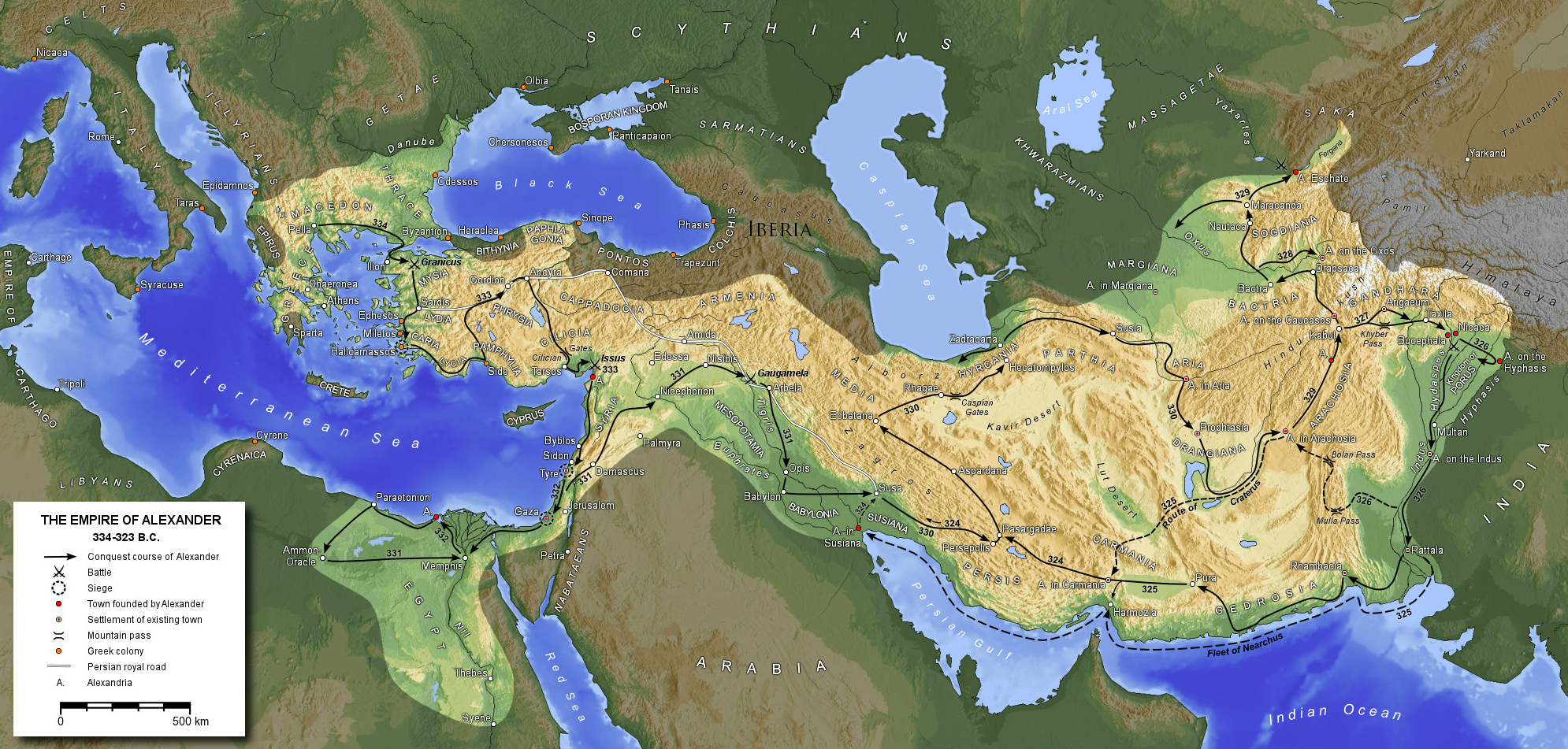
Alexander the Great, born in Pella, whose conquests led to the Hellenistic period

After Philip's assassination at Aigai in 336 BC, his son Alexander became king of Macedon, established himself as leader of a Panhellenic campaign against the Persian Empire, and conquered it. Undefeated in battle, he marched to the banks of the Hydaspes, until his untimely death in 323 BC in Babylon. Alexander's empire fragmented, inaugurating the Hellenistic period. After fierce conflict amongst themselves, the generals that succeeded Alexander and their successors founded large personal kingdoms, such as that of the Ptolemies in Egypt, the Seleucids in Syria, Mesopotamia, Anatolia and Iran, Lysimachus in Thrace and Anatolia, Antigonids and Pyrrhus of Epirus in Greece. The newly founded poleis of these kingdoms, such as Alexandria and Antioch, were settled by Greeks as members of a ruling minority. As a result, during the centuries that followed a vernacular form of Greek, known as koine, and Greek culture was spread, while the Greeks adopted Eastern deities and cults. In India, the Indo-Greeks blended Greek and Buddhist religious practices and brought about an artistic renaissance that led to the creation of Greco-Buddhist art. Greek science, technology, and mathematics reached their peak during the Hellenistic period. Aspiring to maintain their autonomy and independence from the Macedonian Greek Antigonid kings and other Hellenistic kingdoms, many poleis of Greece united in koina or sympoliteiai i.e. federations, like the Aetolian and Achaean League, while after the establishment of economic relations with the East, a stratum of wealthy euergetai dominated their internal life. Greek knowledge reached parts of what would hundreds of years later become the Islamic world, beginning a long period of technological and mathematical influence.

=== Roman province (146 BC – 4th century AD) ===
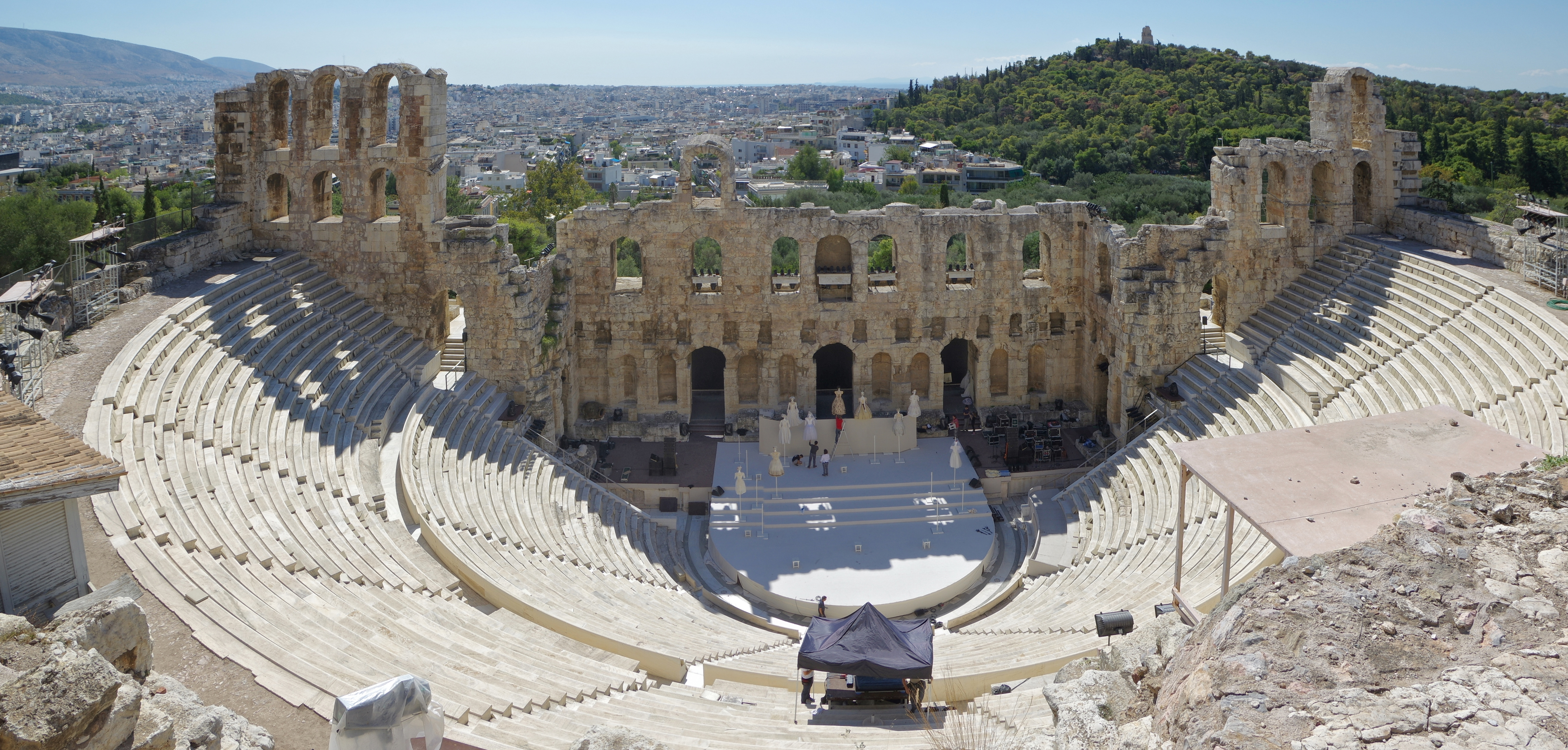
The Odeon of Herodes Atticus in Athens, built in 161 AD

In 280 BC, Pyrrhus of Epirus campaigned in Italy against the Romans in order to help Tarentum. From about 200 BC, the Roman Republic became increasingly involved in Greek affairs and engaged in a series of wars with Macedon. Macedon's defeat at the Battle of Pydna in 168 BC signalled the end of Antigonid power. In 146 BC, Macedonia was annexed as a province by Rome, and the rest of Greece became a Roman protectorate. The process was completed in 27 BC, when emperor Augustus annexed the rest of Greece and constituted it as the senatorial province of Achaea. Despite their military superiority, the Romans admired and became heavily influenced by Greek culture.

Greek-speaking communities of the Hellenised East were instrumental in the spread of Christianity in the 2nd and 3rd centuries, and Christianity's early leaders and writers were mostly Greek-speaking, though not from Greece itself. The New Testament was written in Greek, and some sections attest to the importance of churches in Greece in early Christianity. Nevertheless, much of Greece clung to paganism, and ancient Greek religious practices were still in vogue in the late 4th century AD, when they were outlawed by the Roman emperor Theodosius I in 391–392. The last recorded Olympic games were held in 393, and many temples were destroyed or damaged in the century that followed. The closure of the Neoplatonic Academy of Athens by Emperor Justinian in 529 is considered the end of antiquity, although there is evidence that the academy continued.

=== Medieval period (4th–15th centuries) ===
The Byzantine (Eastern Roman) Empire after the death of Basil II in 1025

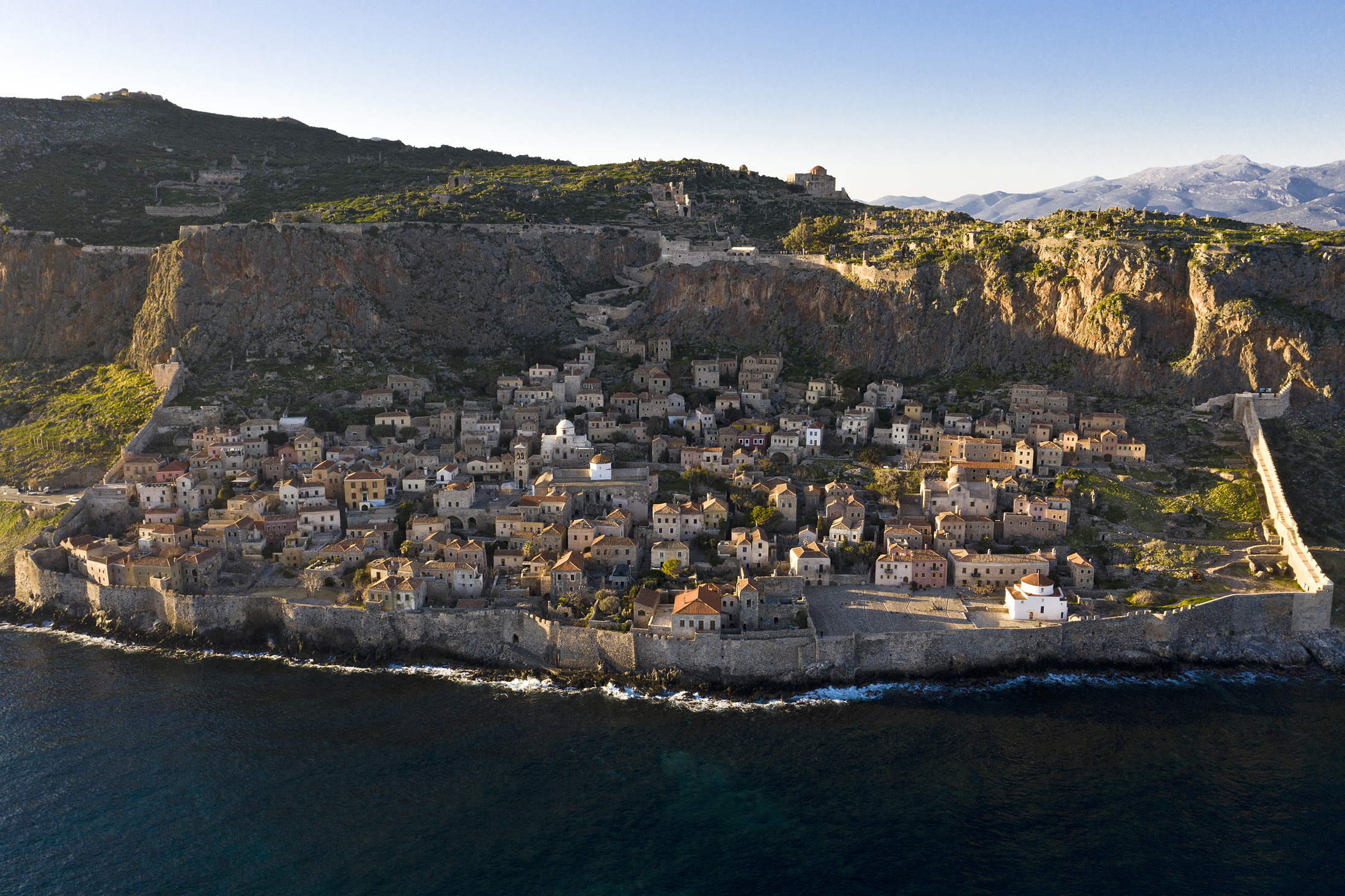
View of the medieval fortress city of Monemvasia

The Roman Empire in the east, following the fall of the Western Roman Empire in the 5th century, is known as the Byzantine Empire, but called "Kingdom of the Romans" in its own time. With its capital in Constantinople, its language and culture were Greek and its religion was predominantly Eastern Orthodox Christian. Byzantine Greeks self-identified as Rhōmaîoi (Ῥωμαῖοι, "Romans", a term which in the Greek language had become synonymous with Christian Greeks).

The Empire's Balkan territories, including Greece, suffered from the dislocation of barbarian invasions; raids by Goths and Huns in the 4th and 5th centuries and the Slavic invasion in the 7th century resulted in a collapse in imperial authority in the Greek peninsula. The imperial government retained control of only the islands and coastal areas, particularly the populated walled cities such as Athens, Corinth and Thessalonica. However, the view that Greece underwent decline, fragmentation and depopulation is considered outdated, as cities show institutional continuity and prosperity between the 4th and 6th centuries. In the early 6th century, Greece had approximately 80 cities according to the Synekdemos chronicle, and the 4th to the 7th century is considered one of high prosperity.

Until the 8th century, almost all of modern Greece was under the jurisdiction of the Holy See of Rome. Byzantine Emperor Leo III moved the border of the Patriarchate of Constantinople westward and northward in the 8th century. The Byzantine recovery of lost provinces during the Arab–Byzantine wars began in the 8th century. Most of the Greek peninsula also came under imperial control again. This process was facilitated by a large influx of Greeks from Sicily and Asia Minor to the Greek peninsula, while many Slavs were captured and resettled in Asia Minor.

During the late 9th, 10th, and early 11th centuries, under the Macedonian dynasty, the empire recovered lost territories and experienced a cultural revival in spheres such as philosophy and the arts. This period has been dubbed the "Golden Age" of Byzantium. During the 11th and 12th centuries, under the Komnenos dynasty, the return of stability resulted in the Greek peninsula benefiting from economic growth. The Greek Orthodox Church was instrumental in the spread of Greek ideas to the wider Orthodox world.

Constantinople was captured by the Fourth Crusade in 1204, becoming the capital of the Latin Empire, which briefly ruled much of the former Byzantine lands. Three Greek rump states–the Despotate of Epirus, the Empire of Nicaea, and the Empire of Trebizond–were established by fleeing Byzantine aristocrats who resisted the Latin rule. The recapture of Constantinople as the imperial capital in 1261 by the Empire of Nicaea was accompanied by the empire's recovery of much of the Greek peninsula, while the islands remained under Genoese and Venetian control. During the Paleologi dynasty (1261–1453), a new era of Greek patriotism emerged accompanied by a deliberate embrace of ancient Greek culture. In the 14th century much of the Greek peninsula was lost by the Byzantine Empire to the Serbs and then the Ottomans. Constantinople fell to the Ottomans in 1453 and by 1460, the Ottoman conquest of mainland Greece was complete.

=== Venetian possessions and Ottoman rule (15th century – 1821) ===
During the 15th to early 19th centuries, while much of mainland Greece and the Aegean islands fell under Ottoman control, Venice retained several key territories. Notably, Crete remained under Venetian rule until 1669, and the Ionian Islands were governed by Venice until 1797. These islands were subsequently ceded to French and later British control. While some Greeks in the Ionian islands and Constantinople lived in prosperity, and Greeks of Constantinople (Phanariots) achieved power within the Ottoman administration, much of Greece suffered the economic consequences of Ottoman conquest. Heavy taxes were enforced, and in later years the Ottoman Empire enacted a policy of creation of hereditary estates, effectively turning the rural Greek populations into serfs, while the Ottoman conquest had cut Greece off from European historical developments.

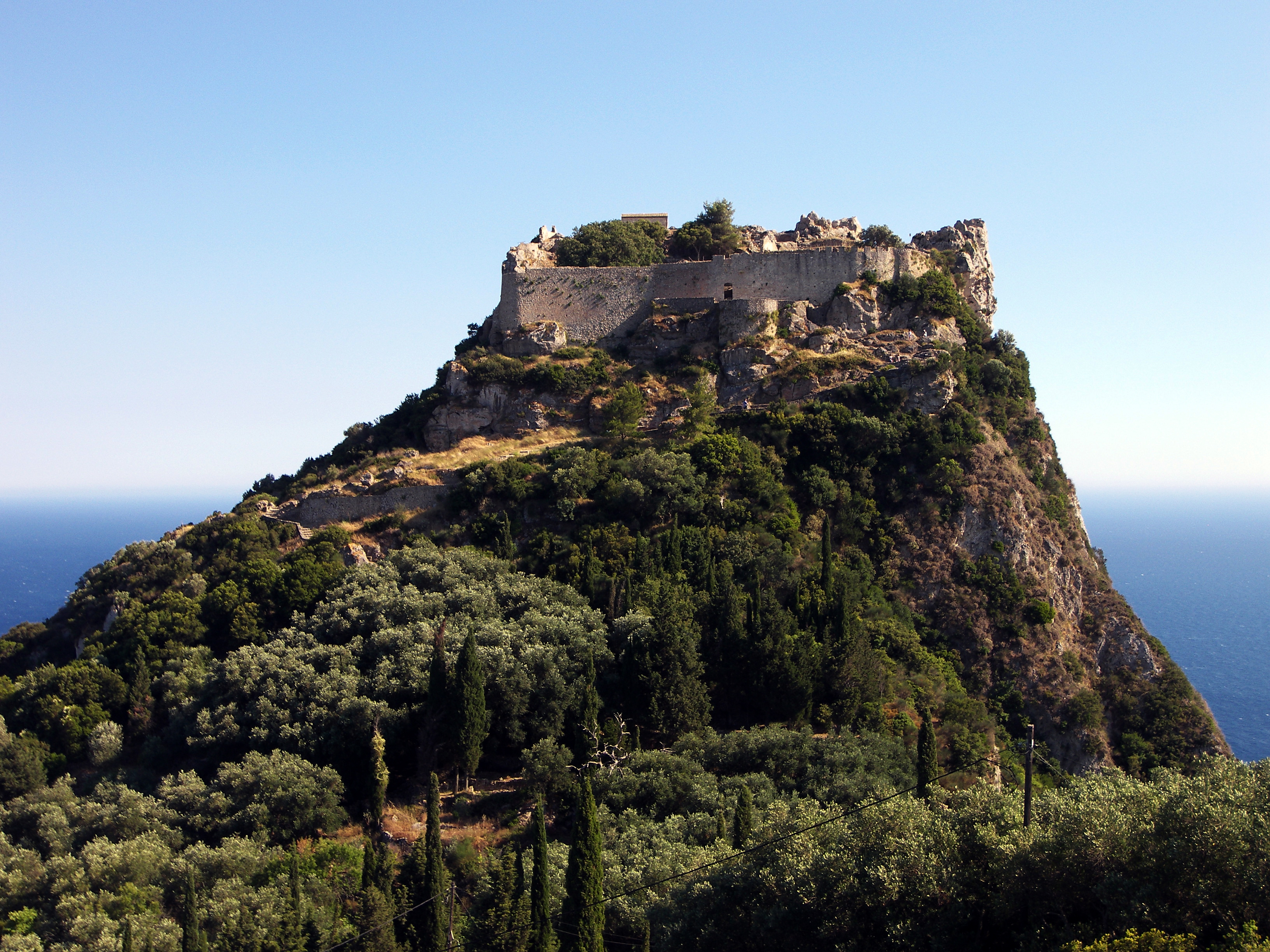
The Byzantine castle of Angelokastro successfully repulsed the Ottomans during the first great siege of Corfu in 1537, the siege of 1571, and the second great siege of Corfu in 1716, causing them to abandon their plans to conquer Corfu.

The Greek Orthodox Church and the Ecumenical Patriarchate of Constantinople were considered by the Ottoman governments as the ruling authorities of the entire Orthodox Christian population of the Ottoman Empire, whether ethnically Greek or not. Although the Ottoman state did not force non-Muslims to convert to Islam, Christians faced discrimination. Discrimination, particularly when combined with harsh treatment by local Ottoman authorities, led to conversions to Islam, if only superficially. In the 19th century, many "crypto-Christians" returned to their old religious allegiance.

The nature of Ottoman administration of Greece varied, though it was invariably arbitrary and often harsh. Some cities had governors appointed by the Sultan, while others, like Athens, were self-governed municipalities. Mountainous regions in the interior and many islands remained effectively autonomous from the central Ottoman state for centuries. The 16th and 17th centuries are regarded as a "dark age" in Greek history. However, prior to the Greek Revolution of 1821, there had been wars which saw Greeks fight against the Ottomans, such as the Greek participation in the Battle of Lepanto in 1571, the Morean War of 1684–1699, and the Russian-instigated Orlov revolt in 1770. These uprisings were put down by the Ottomans with great bloodshed. Many Greeks were conscripted as Ottoman subjects to serve in the Ottoman army and especially the navy, while the Ecumenical Patriarchate of Constantinople, responsible for the Orthodox, remained in general loyal to the Empire.

=== Modern nation-state ===
==== Greek War of Independence (1821–1832) ====
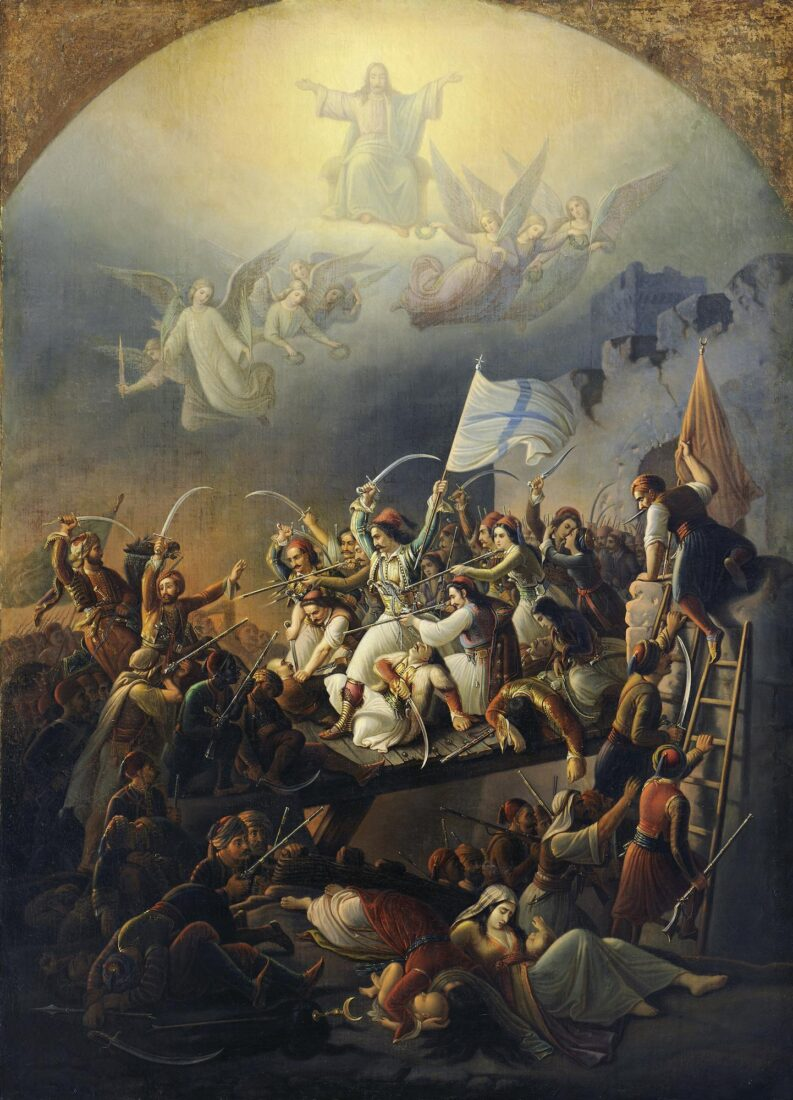
The sortie (exodus) of Messolonghi, depicting the third siege of Missolonghi, painted by Theodoros Vryzakis

In the 18th century, Greek merchants came to dominate trade within the Ottoman Empire, established communities throughout the Mediterranean, the Balkans, and Europe, and used their wealth to fund educational activities that brought younger generations into contact with Western ideas. In the 18th century, an increase in learning during the Modern Greek Enlightenment led to the emergence among Westernised Greek-speaking elites of the notion of a Greek nation. A secret organisation formed in this milieu was the Filiki Eteria, in 1814. They engaged traditional strata of the Greek Orthodox world in their liberal nationalist cause.

The first revolt began on 6 March 1821 in the Danubian Principalities, but was put down by the Ottomans. This spurred the Greeks of the Peloponnese and on 17 March the Maniots declared war on the Ottomans. By October 1821 the Greeks had captured Tripolitsa. There were revolts in Crete, Macedonia and Central Greece, which were suppressed. In 1822 and 1824 the Turks and Egyptians ravaged the islands, committing massacres. This galvanised opinion in western Europe in favour of the Greeks. The Ottoman Sultan Mahmud II negotiated with Mehmet Ali of Egypt, who agreed to send his son Ibrahim Pasha with an army, in return for territorial gain. By the end of 1825, most of the Peloponnese was under Egyptian control. Three great powers, France, Russian Empire, and the United Kingdom, each sent a navy. The allied fleet destroyed the Ottoman–Egyptian fleet at the Battle of Navarino, and the Greeks captured Central Greece by 1828. The nascent Greek state was recognised under the London Protocol in 1830.

==== Kingdom of Greece ====
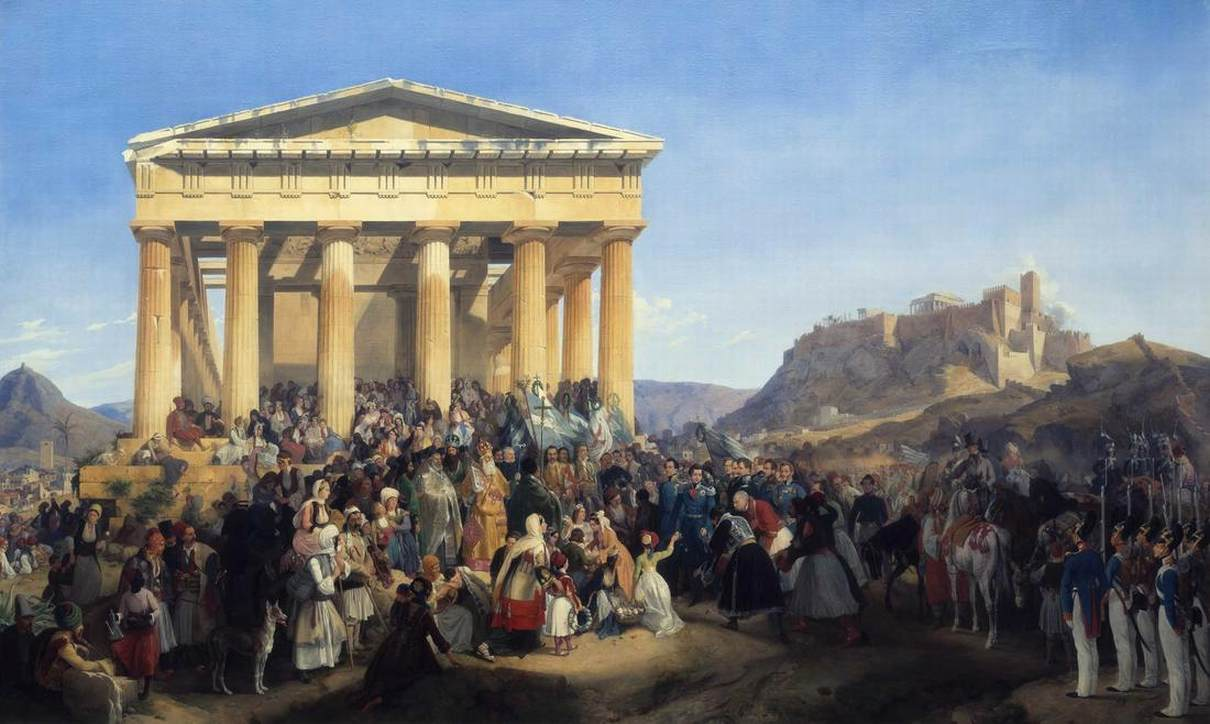
The Entry of King Otto of Greece into Athens, painted by Peter von Hess in 1839

In 1827, Ioannis Kapodistrias was chosen by the Third National Assembly at Troezen as the first governor of the First Hellenic Republic. Kapodistrias established state, economic and military institutions. Tensions appeared between him and local interests and, following his assassination in 1831 and the London Conference of 1832, Britain, France and Russia installed Bavarian Prince Otto von Wittelsbach as monarch. Otto's reign was despotic, and in its first 11 years of independence Greece was ruled by a Bavarian oligarchy led by Josef Ludwig von Armansperg and, later, by Otto himself, as King and Premier. Greece remained under the influence of its three protecting great powers. In 1843 an uprising forced Otto to grant a constitution and representative assembly.

Despite the absolutism of Otto's reign, it proved instrumental in developing institutions which are still the bedrock of Greek administration and education. Reforms were taken in education, maritime and postal communications, effective civil administration and the legal code. Historical revisionism took the form of de-Byzantinification and de-Ottomanisation, in favour of promoting Ancient Greek heritage. The capital was moved from Nafplio, where it had been since 1829, to Athens, then a smaller town. The Church of Greece was established as Greece's national church and 25 March, the day of Annunciation, was chosen as the anniversary of the Greek War of Independence to reinforce the link between Greek identity and Orthodoxy.

Otto was deposed in 1862 because of the Bavarian-dominated government, heavy taxation, and a failed attempt to annex Crete from the Ottomans. He was replaced by Prince Wilhelm of Denmark, who took the name George I and brought with him the Ionian Islands as a coronation gift from Britain. A new Constitution in 1864 changed Greece's form of government from constitutional monarchy to the more democratic crowned republic. In 1875 parliamentary majority as a requirement for government was introduced, curbing the power of the monarchy to appoint minority governments. Corruption, coupled with increased spending to fund infrastructure like the Corinth Canal, overtaxed the weak economy and forced the declaration of public insolvency in 1893.

The territorial evolution of the Kingdom of Greece from 1832 to 1947

Greeks were united, however, in their determination to liberate the Hellenic lands under Ottoman rule; the Cretan Revolt (1866–1869) had raised nationalist fervour. When war broke out between Russia and the Ottomans in 1877, Greek sentiment rallied to Russia, but Greece was too poor and concerned about British intervention, to enter the war. Greeks in Crete continued to stage revolts, and in 1897, the Greek government, bowing to popular pressure, declared war on the Ottomans. In the ensuing Greco-Turkish War of 1897, the badly trained and equipped Greek army was defeated. Through the intervention of the Great Powers, however, Greece lost little territory, while Crete was established as an autonomous state under Prince George of Greece. With state coffers empty, fiscal policy came under International Financial Control. The government, aiming to quell Komitadjis and detach the Slavophone peasants of the region from Bulgarian influence, sponsored a guerrilla campaign in Ottoman-ruled Macedonia, known as the Macedonian Struggle, which ended with the Young Turk Revolution in 1908.

==== Expansion, disaster, and reconstruction ====
Amidst dissatisfaction with the seeming inertia and unattainability of national aspirations, military officers organised a coup in 1909 and called on Cretan politician Eleftherios Venizelos, who conveyed a vision of national regeneration. After winning two elections and becoming prime minister in 1910, Venizelos initiated fiscal, social, and constitutional reforms, reorganised the military, made Greece a member of the Balkan League, and led it through the Balkan Wars. By 1913, Greece's territory and population had doubled, annexing Crete, Epirus, and Macedonia. The struggle between King Constantine I and charismatic Venizelos over foreign policy on the eve of the First World War dominated politics and divided the country into two opposing groups. During parts of the war, Greece had two governments: a royalist pro-German one in Athens and a Venizelist pro-Entente one in Thessaloniki. Greece was reunified in 1917 under Venizelos and entered the war on the side of the Entente.

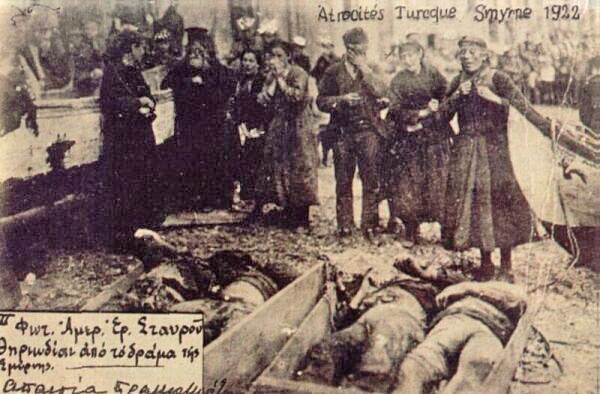
Greek civilians mourn their relatives killed in the Great Fire of Smyrna during the Greek genocide in 1922.

After the war, Greece attempted expansion into Asia Minor, a region with a large native Greek population, but was defeated in the Greco-Turkish War (1919–1922), contributing to a flight of Asia Minor Greeks. These events overlapped with the Greek genocide (1914–22), when Ottoman and Turkish officials contributed to the death of several hundred thousand Asia Minor Greeks, along with similar numbers of Assyrians and a larger number of Armenians. The resultant Greek exodus from Asia Minor was made permanent, and expanded, in an official population exchange between Greece and Turkey, as part of the Treaty of Lausanne which ended the war. The following era was marked by instability, as over 1.5 million propertyless Greek refugees from Turkey (some of whom could not speak Greek) had to be integrated into Greek society. The refugees made a dramatic population boost, as they were more than a quarter of Greece's prior population.

Following the catastrophic events in Asia Minor, the monarchy was abolished via a referendum in 1924 and the Second Hellenic Republic was declared. In 1935, a royalist general-turned-politician Georgios Kondylis took power after a coup and abolished the republic, holding a rigged referendum, after which King George II was restored to the throne.

==== Dictatorship, World War II, and reconstruction ====
An agreement between Prime Minister Ioannis Metaxas and George II followed in 1936, which installed Metaxas as head of a dictatorship known as the 4th of August Regime, inaugurating authoritarian rule that would last until 1974. Greece remained on good terms with Britain and was not allied with the Axis.

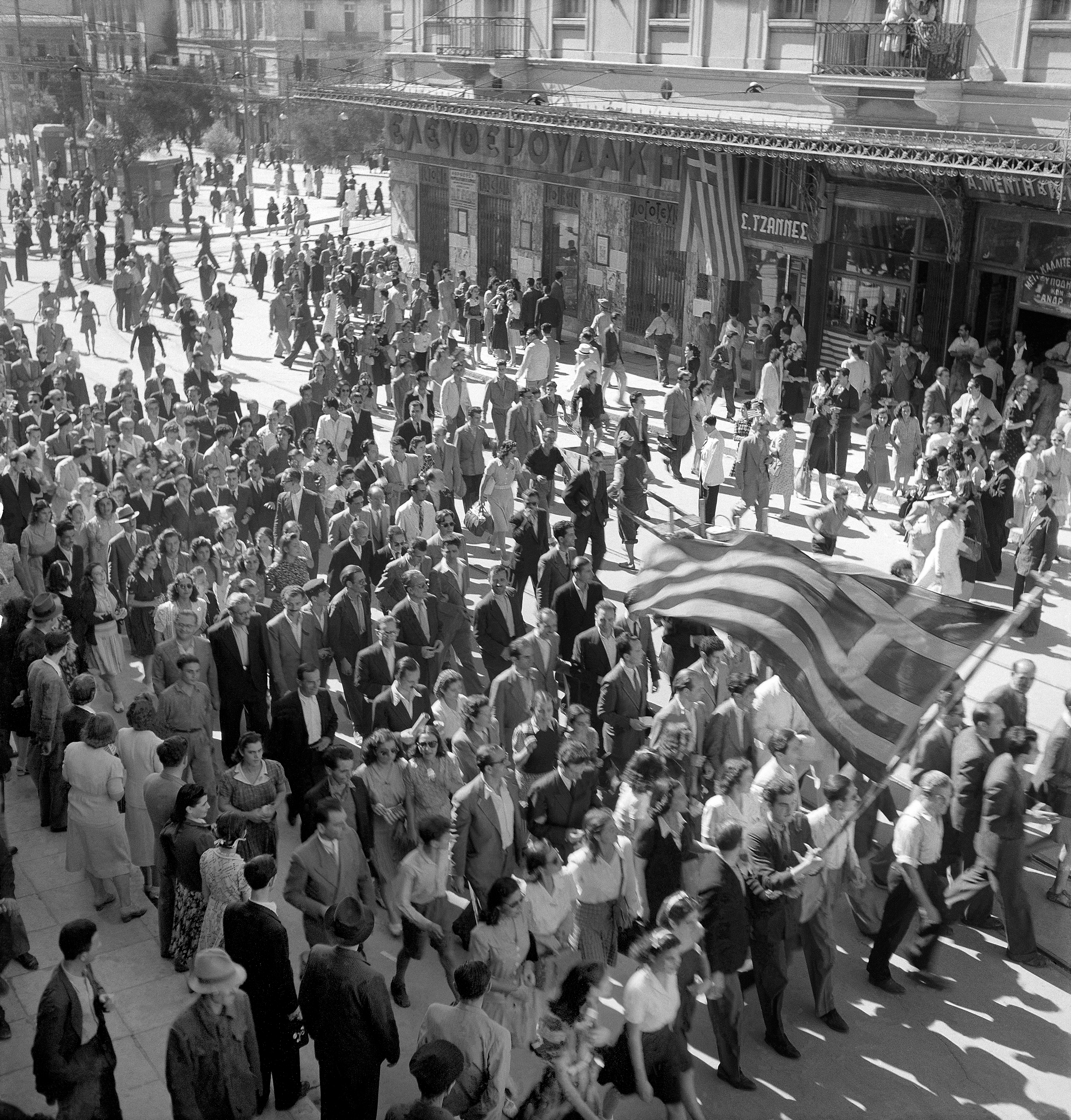
People in Athens celebrate the liberation from the Axis powers, October 1944. Postwar Greece would soon experience the Greek Civil War and political polarisation

In October 1940, Fascist Italy demanded the surrender of Greece, but it refused, and, in the Greco-Italian War, Greece repelled Italian forces into Albania. French general Charles de Gaulle praised the fierceness of the Greek resistance, but the country fell to urgently dispatched German forces during the Battle of Greece. The Nazis proceeded to administer Athens and Thessaloniki, while other regions were given to Fascist Italy and Bulgaria. Over 100,000 civilians died of starvation during the winter of 1941–42, tens of thousands more died because of reprisals by Nazis and collaborators, the economy was ruined, and most Greek Jews (tens of thousands) were deported and murdered in Nazi concentration camps. The Greek Resistance, mainly EAM-ELAS (being the largest organisation) and EDES, was one of the most effective resistance movements in Europe fighting against the Nazis. The German occupiers committed atrocities, mass executions, and wholesale slaughter of civilians and destruction of towns and villages in reprisals. Hundreds of villages were systematically torched and almost 1 million Greeks left homeless. The Germans executed around 21,000 Greeks, the Bulgarians 40,000, and the Italians 9,000.

Following liberation, Greece annexed the Dodecanese Islands from Italy and regained Western Thrace from Bulgaria. The country descended into a civil war between the communist forces and the anti-communist Greek government, which lasted until 1949, with the latter's victory. The conflict, one of the earliest struggles of the Cold War, resulted in further economic devastation, population displacement and political polarisation for the next thirty years.

Although the post-war period was characterised by social strife and marginalisation of the left, Greece experienced rapid economic growth and recovery, propelled in part by the U.S. Marshall Plan. In 1952, Greece joined NATO, reinforcing its membership in the Western Bloc of the Cold War. The post-war period was dominated by Konstantinos Karamanlis. Following his appointment as Prime Minister in October 1955, Karamanlis oversaw a period of rapid and sustained economic growth. Alongside key policymakers such as Georgios Kartalis and Spyros Markezinis, Karamanlis’s government pursued an activist state policy, investing heavily in public infrastructure and industrial development to propel Greece toward the status of a developed nation. Karamanlis advocated for Greece’s integration into the European Economic Community (EEC) and, in July 1961, Greece signed an agreement to join the bloc.

The Centre Union won a minority vote in the 1963 elections and formed a government in the 1964 elections. Prime Minister George Papandreou's relationship with the new King, Constantine II, deteriorated. Papandreou openly clashed with the King and resigned in July 1965. The latter lured in Centre Union members to form unelected coalition governments, resulting in prolonged political instability for the next two years that culminated in a coup in 1967 by a group of colonels led by Georgios Papadopoulos. Civil rights were suspended, political repression intensified, and human rights abuses, including torture, were rampant. Economic growth remained rapid before plateauing in 1972. The brutal suppression of the Athens Polytechnic uprising in 1973 set in motion the fall of the regime, resulting in a counter-coup that established brigadier Dimitrios Ioannidis as the new junta strongman. On 20 July 1974, Turkey invaded the island of Cyprus in response to a Greek-backed Cypriot coup, triggering a crisis in Greece that led to the regime's collapse and restoration of democracy through Metapolitefsi.

==== Third Hellenic Republic ====
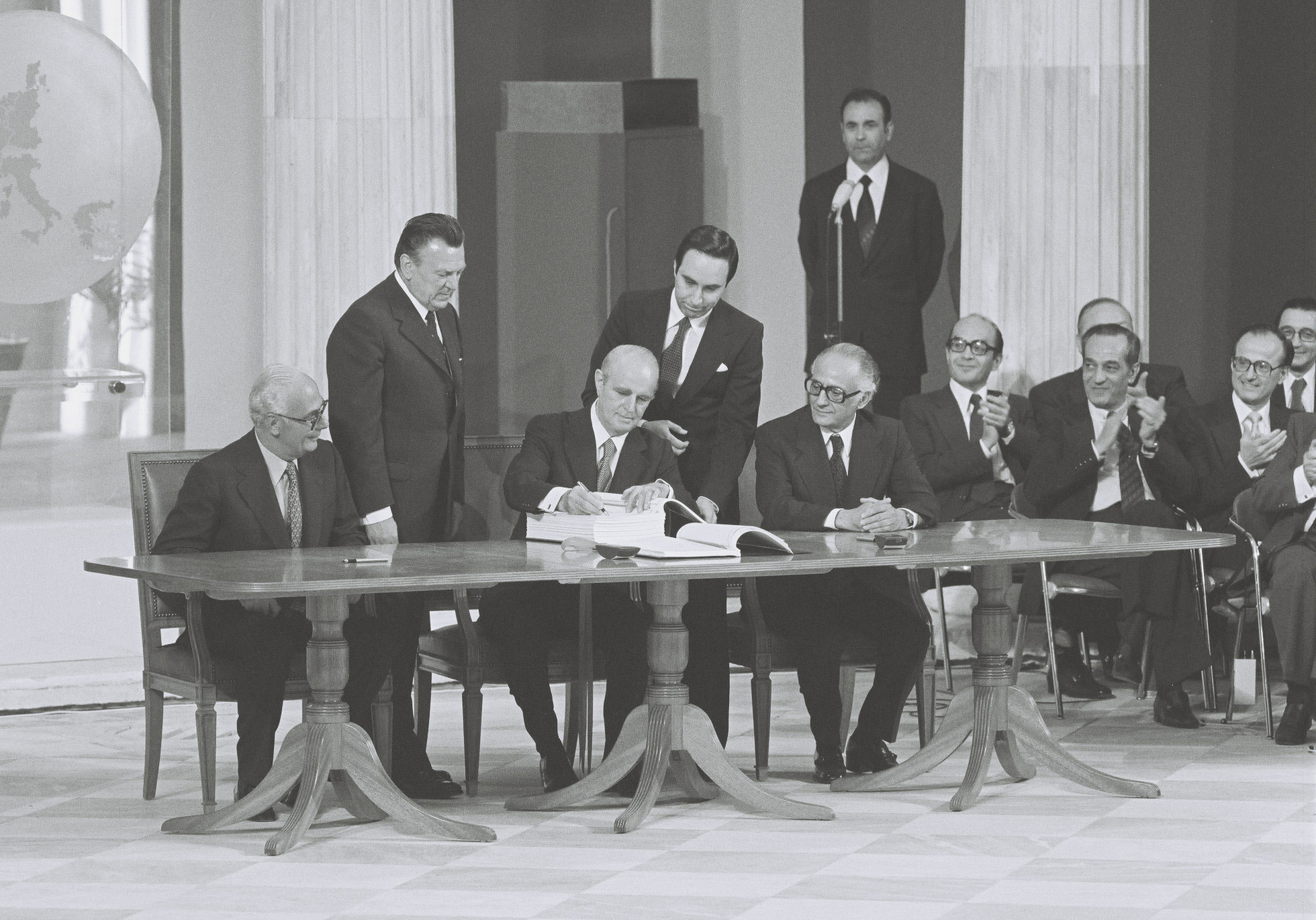
Signing at Zappeion by Constantine Karamanlis of the documents for the accession of Greece to the European Communities in 1979

The former prime minister Konstantinos Karamanlis was invited back from self-exile and the first multiparty elections since 1964 were held on the first anniversary of the Polytechnic uprising. A democratic and republican constitution was promulgated in 1975 following a referendum which chose not to restore the monarchy.

Meanwhile, Andreas Papandreou, George Papandreou's son, founded the Panhellenic Socialist Movement (PASOK) in response to Karamanlis's conservative New Democracy party, with the two political formations dominating government over the next four decades. Greece rejoined NATO in 1980. (Note: On 14 August 1974 Greek forces withdrew from the integrated military structure of NATO in protest at the Turkish occupation of northern Cyprus; Greece rejoined NATO in 1980.) Greece became the tenth member of the European Communities in 1981, ushering in sustained growth. Investments in industrial enterprises and heavy infrastructure, as well as funds from the European Union and growing revenue from tourism, shipping, and a fast-growing service sector raised the standard of living. In 1981, Andreas Papandreou came to power and implemented an ambitious program of social reforms. He recognised civil marriage, the dowry was abolished, while expanding access to education and health care. However, he made controversial foreign policy decisions that fueled the rise of terrorism in Greece. Papandreou's tenure has been associated with corruption (see Koskotas and Yugoslav corn scandals) and the first constitutional crisis of the new republic, while his economic policies failed to address the persistent stagflation and chronic budget deficits that exacerbated Greece's economic problems.

The country adopted the euro in 2001 and successfully hosted the 2004 Summer Olympic Games in Athens. In 2010, Greece suffered from the Great Recession and related Eurozone crisis. Due to the adoption of the euro, Greece could no longer devalue its currency to regain competitiveness. In the 2012 elections, there was major political change, with new parties emerging from the collapse of the two main parties, PASOK and New Democracy. In 2015, Alexis Tsipras was elected as prime minister, the first outside the two main parties. The Greek government-debt crisis, and subsequent austerity policies, resulted in social strife. The crisis ended around 2018, with the end of the bailout mechanisms and return of growth. Simultaneously, Tsipras, and the leader of North Macedonia, Zoran Zaev, signed the Prespa Agreement, solving the naming dispute that had strained relations and eased the latter's path to EU and NATO membership.

In 2019, Kyriakos Mitsotakis became Greece's new prime minister, after his centre-right New Democracy won the election. In 2020, Greece's parliament elected a non-partisan candidate, Katerina Sakellaropoulou, as the first female President of Greece. In February 2024, Greece became the first Orthodox Christian country to recognise same-sex marriage and adoption by same-sex couples.

In 2023, Greece became a member of the Three Seas Initiative.

== Geography ==
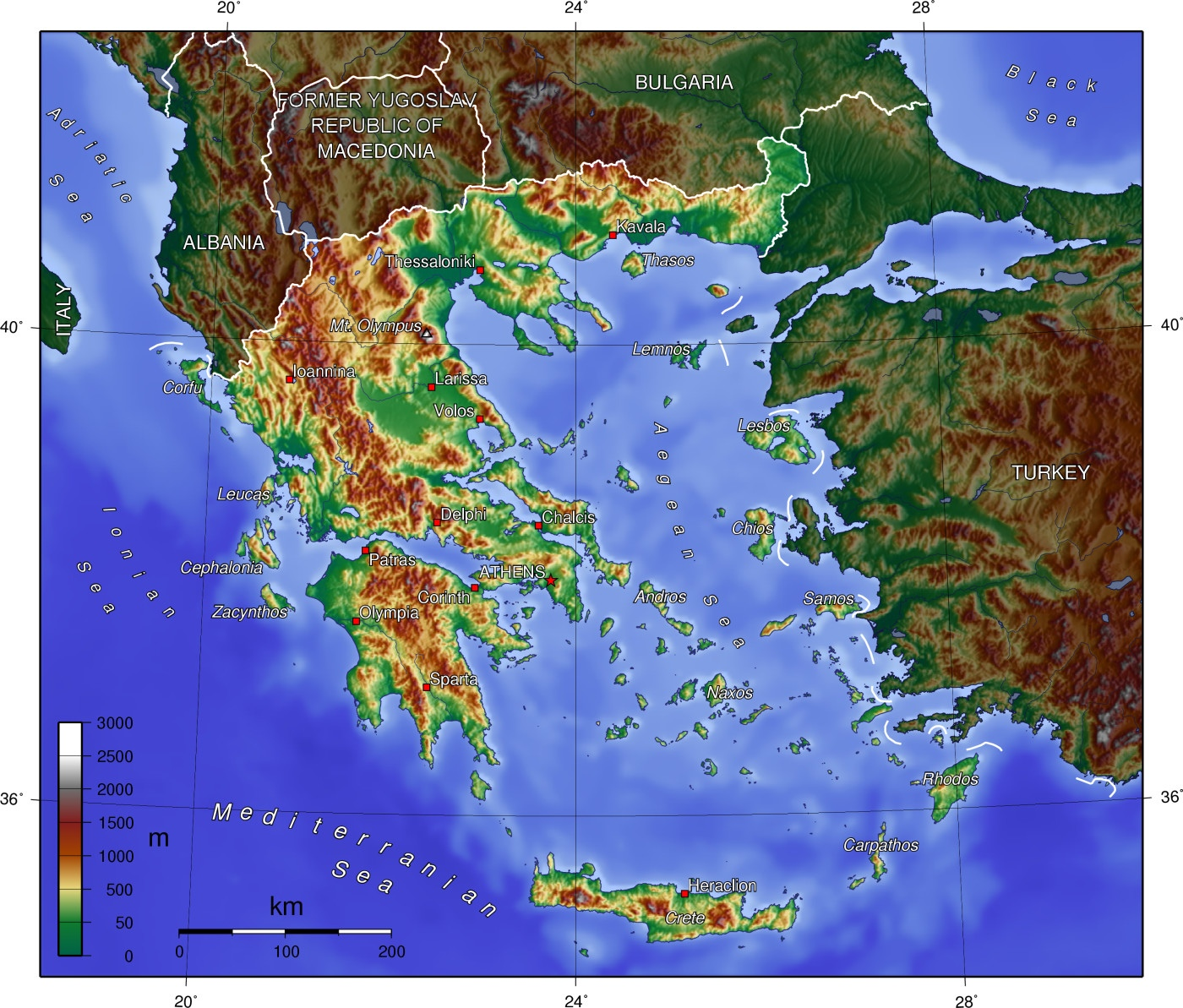
Topographic map of Greece

Located in Southern and Southeast Europe, Greece has the longest coastline on the Mediterranean basin, spanning thousands of islands and nine traditional geographic regions: Macedonia, Central Greece, Peloponnese, Thessaly, Epirus, Aegean Islands, Thrace, Crete and Ionian Islands. Greece consists of a mountainous, peninsular mainland jutting out into the sea at the southern end of the Balkans, ending at the Peloponnese peninsula (separated from the mainland by the canal of the Isthmus of Corinth) and strategically located at the crossroads of Europe, Asia, and Africa. (Note: See:) Its highly indented coastline and numerous islands give Greece the 11th longest national coastline in the world, with 13,676 km (8,498 mi); its land boundary is 1,160 km (721 mi). The country lies approximately between latitudes 34° and 42° N, and longitudes 19° and 30° E, with the extreme points being: the village Ormenio in the North and the islands Gavdos (South), Strongyli near Kastellorizo (East), and Othonoi (West). Gavdos is considered the southernmost point of Europe.

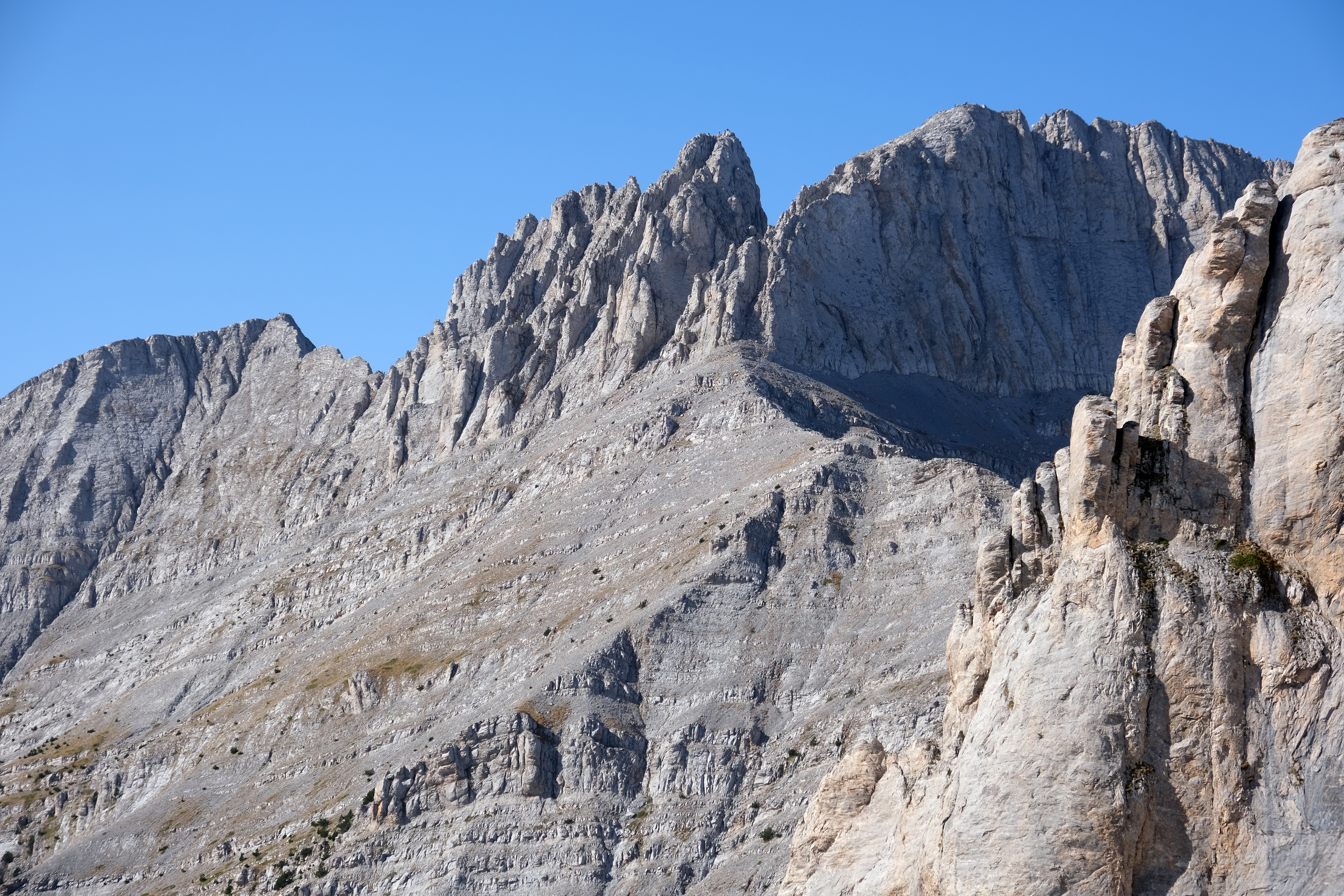
Mount Olympus is the highest mountain in Greece and mythical abode of the Olympian gods.

Approximately 80% of Greece consists of mountains or hills, making the country one of the most mountainous in Europe. Mount Olympus, the mythical abode of the Greek gods ruled by Zeus, rises to 2,918 metres (9,573 ft) at Mytikas peak, the highest in the country. Western Greece contains a number of lakes and wetlands and is dominated by the Pindus mountain range. The Pindus, a continuation of the Dinaric Alps, reaches a maximum elevation of 2,637 m (8,652 ft) at Mouth Smolikas (the second-highest in Greece) and historically has been a significant barrier to east–west travel. Its extensions cross through the Peloponnese, ending in the island of Crete. The Vikos Gorge, part of the Vikos-Aoos National Park in the Pindus range, is listed by the Guinness book of World Records as the deepest gorge in the world relative to its width. Another notable formation are the Meteora rock pillars, atop which have been built medieval Greek Orthodox monasteries.

Northeastern Greece features another high-altitude mountain range, the Rhodope range, spreading across the region of Eastern Macedonia and Thrace; this area is covered with vast, thick, ancient forests, including the famous Dadia Forest in the Evros regional unit, in the far northeast of the country.

Extensive plains are primarily located in the regions of Thessaly, Central Macedonia, and Thrace. They constitute key economic regions as they are among the few arable places in the country.

=== Islands ===
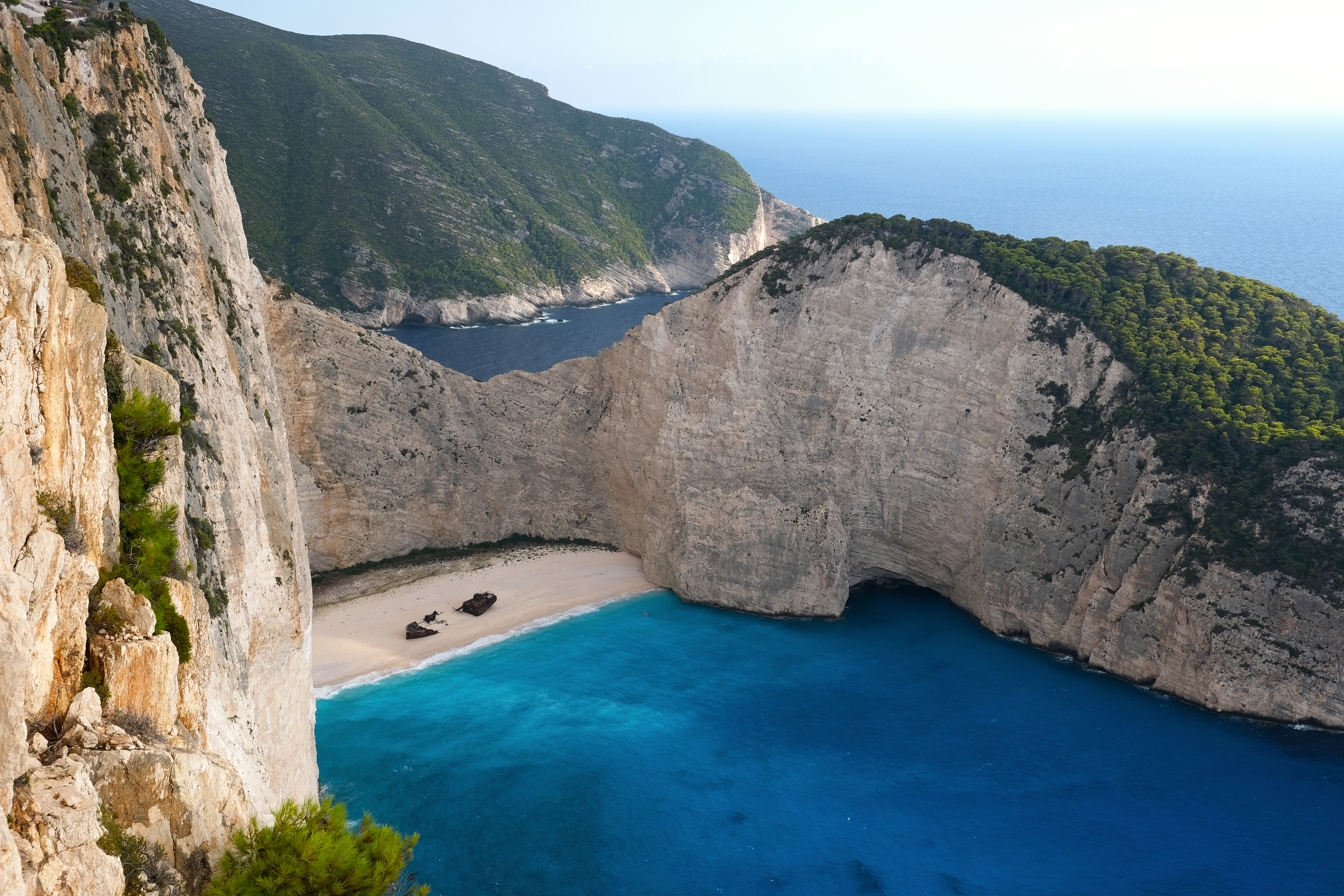
Navagio (shipwreck) bay, Zakynthos island

Greece features a vast number of islands—between 1,200 and 6,000, depending on the definition, 227 of which are inhabited. Crete is the largest and most populous island; Euboea, separated from the mainland by the 60 m-wide Euripus Strait, is the second largest, followed by Lesbos and Rhodes.

The Greek islands are traditionally grouped into the following clusters: the Argo-Saronic Islands in the Saronic gulf near Athens; the Cyclades, a large but dense collection occupying the central part of the Aegean Sea; the North Aegean islands, a loose grouping off the west coast of Turkey; the Dodecanese, another loose collection in the southeast between Crete and Turkey; the Sporades, a small tight group off the coast of northeast Euboea; and the Ionian Islands, located to the west of the mainland in the Ionian Sea.

=== Climate ===
Greece's Köppen Climate Types

The climate of Greece is primarily Mediterranean (Köppen: Csa), featuring mild to cool, wet winters and hot, dry summers. This climate occurs at most of the coastal locations, including Athens, the Cyclades, the Dodecanese, Crete, the Peloponnese, the Ionian Islands, and parts of mainland Greece. The Pindus mountain range strongly affects the climate of the country, as areas to the west of the range are considerably wetter on average (due to greater exposure to south-westerly systems bringing in moisture) than the areas lying to the east of the range (due to a rain shadow effect), resulting to some coastal areas in the south falling to the hot semi-arid climate (Köppen: BSh) category, such as parts of the Athens Riviera and some of the Cyclades, as well as some areas in the north featuring a cold equivalent climate (Köppen: BSk), such as the cities of Thessaloniki and Larissa.

The mountainous areas and the higher elevations of northwestern Greece (parts of Epirus, Central Greece, Thessaly, Western Macedonia) as well as in the mountainous central parts of Peloponnese – including parts of the regional units of Achaea, Arcadia, and Laconia – feature an Alpine climate (Köppen: D, E) with heavy snowfalls during the winter. Most of the inland parts of northern Greece, in Central Macedonia, the lower elevations of Western Macedonia and Eastern Macedonia and Thrace feature a humid subtropical climate (Köppen: Cfa) with cold, damp winters and hot, moderately dry summers with occasional thunderstorms. Snowfalls occur every year in the mountains and northern areas, and brief periods of snowy weather are possible even in low-lying southern areas, such as Athens.

=== Biodiversity ===
Phytogeographically, Greece belongs to the Boreal Kingdom and is shared between the East Mediterranean province of the Mediterranean Region and the Illyrian province of the Circumboreal Region. According to the World Wide Fund for Nature and the European Environment Agency, the territory of Greece can be subdivided into six ecoregions: the Illyrian deciduous forests, Pindus Mountains mixed forests, Balkan mixed forests, Rhodope montane mixed forests, Aegean and Western Turkey sclerophyllous and mixed forests, and Crete Mediterranean forests. It had a 2018 Forest Landscape Integrity Index mean score of 6.6/10, ranking it 70th globally out of 172 countries. In 2024, Greece became the first country in the European Union to ban bottom trawling in marine protected areas to protect its marine biodiversity. Rare marine species such as the Mediterranean monk seal and the loggerhead sea turtle live in the seas surrounding mainland Greece, while its dense forests are home to the endangered brown bear, the Eurasian lynx, the roe deer, and more. Numerous species have been extirpated from the nation due to human activities such as lions, alpine ibex and European bison.

== Government and politics ==
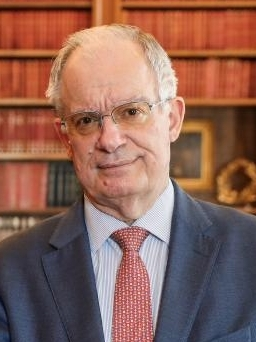
Konstantinos Tasoulas
President

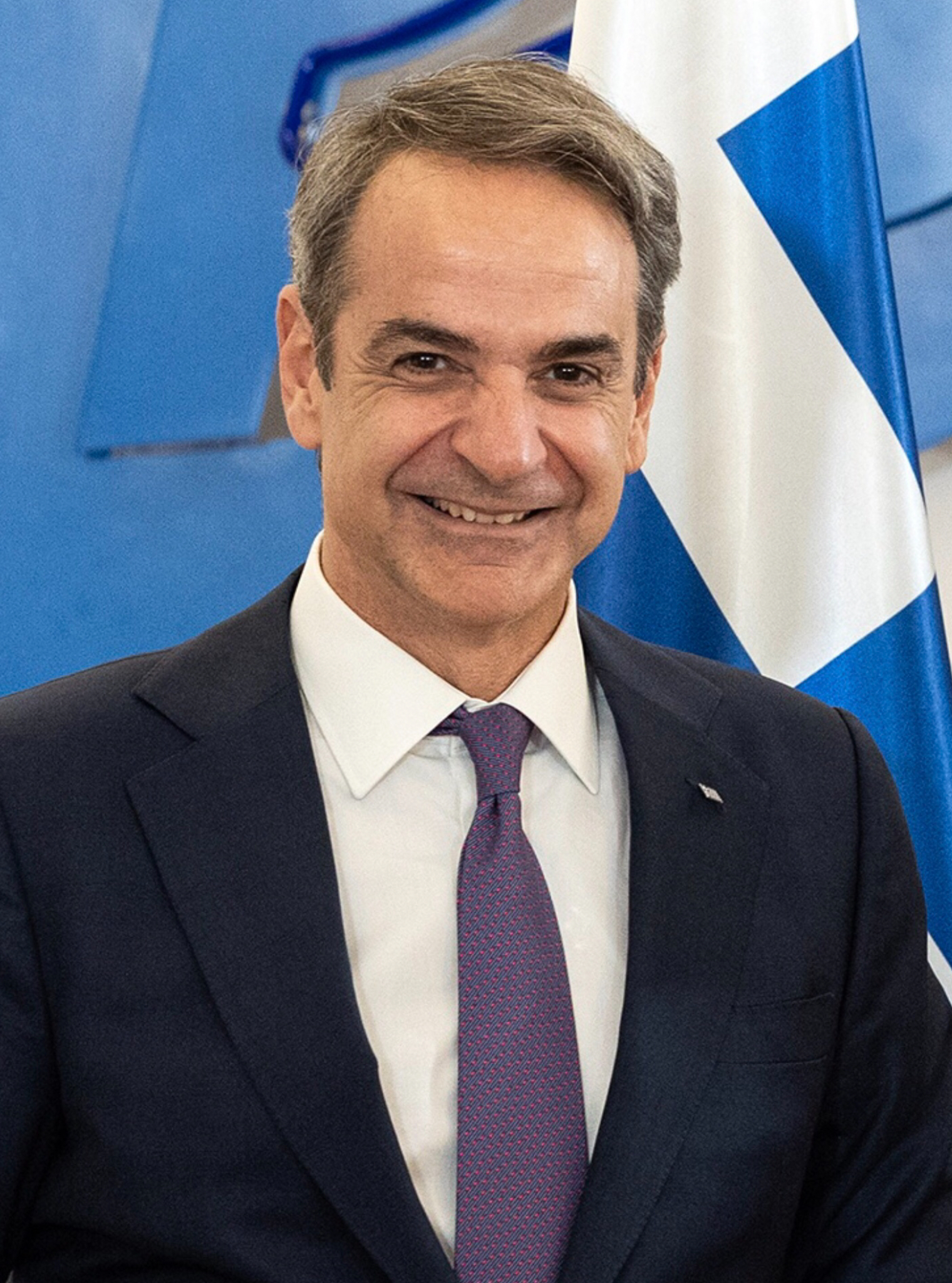
Kyriakos Mitsotakis
Prime Minister

The current Constitution, establishing Greece as a parliamentary republic, was enacted in 1975, after the fall of the military dictatorship of 1967–1974, and has been amended four times since. It consists of 120 articles, provides for a separation of powers into executive, legislative, and judicial branches, and grants extensive specific guarantees (further reinforced in 2001) of civil liberties and social rights.

Legislative powers are exercised by a 300-member unicameral Parliament. According to the Constitution, executive power is exercised by the Government and the President of the Republic, who is the nominal head of state, is elected by the Parliament for a five-year term and promulgates statutes passed by Parliament. However, the Constitutional amendment of 1986 rendered the President's office largely ceremonial; the most powerful officeholder is thus the prime minister, Greece's head of government. The position is filled by the current leader of the political party that can obtain a vote of confidence by the Parliament. The president of the republic formally appoints the prime minister and, on their recommendation, appoints and dismisses the other members of the Cabinet.

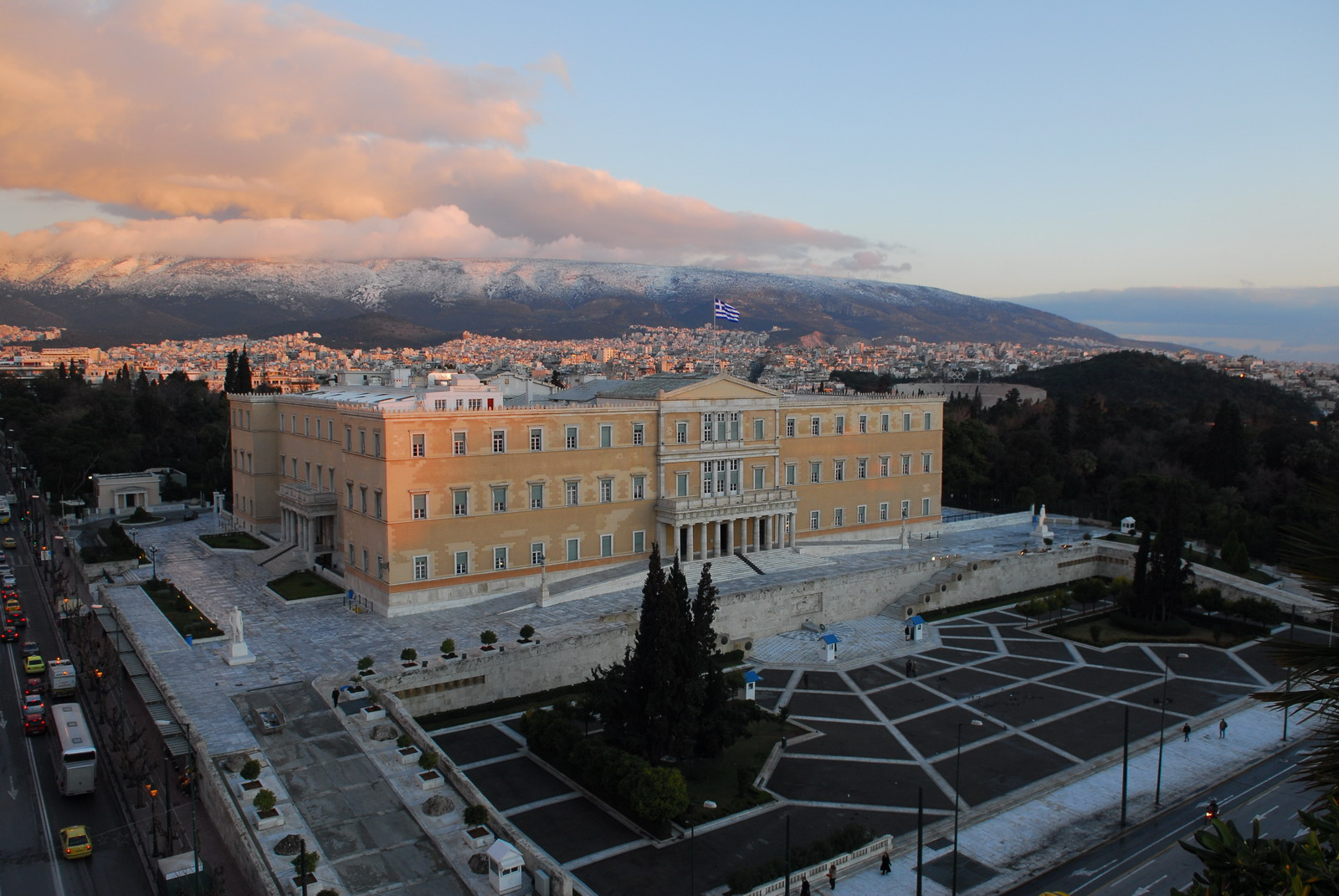
The building of the Hellenic Parliament (Old Royal Palace) in central Athens

Members of Parliament are elected in direct elections, which are conducted with a system of semi-proportional representation with a majority bonus system, usually leading to the formation of single-party governments. Parliamentary elections are held every four years, but early elections are proclaimed by the President on the cabinet's proposal or if a motion of no confidence passes in Parliament. The voting age is 17. Women's suffrage was legislated in 1952.

According to International IDEA's Global State of Democracy (GSoD) Indices and Democracy Tracker, Greece performs in the mid-range on overall democratic measures, with particular strengths in elected government and freedom of movement. Moreover, according to an OECD report, Greeks display a moderate level of civic participation compared to most other developed countries; voter turnout was 58% during recent elections, lower than the OECD average of 69%.

=== Administrative divisions ===
Since the Kallikratis Programme reform entered into effect in January 2011, Greece has consisted of 13 regions, subdivided into municipalities, of which there are now 332 (there were 325 before the Kleisthenis I Programme came into effect in 2019). The 54 old prefectures and prefecture-level administrations have been largely retained as sub-units of the regions. Seven decentralised administrations group one to three regions for administrative purposes on a regional basis. There is one autonomous area, Mount Athos (Greek: Agio Oros, "Holy Mountain"), which borders the region of Central Macedonia.

Map	No.	Region	Capital	Area (km^{2})	Area (sq mi)	Population	Governor (1 January 2024 – 31 December 2028)	GDP (bn)
	1	Attica	Athens	3,808	1,470	3,814,064	Nikos Hardalias (ND)	€84
	2	Central Greece	Lamia	15,549	6,004	508,254	Fanis Spanos (ND)	€8
	3	Central Macedonia	Thessaloniki	18,811	7,263	1,795,669	Nana Aidona (ND)	€24
	4	Crete	Heraklion	8,259	3,189	624,408	Stavros Arnaoutakis (PASOK–KINAL)	€9
	5	Eastern Macedonia and Thrace	Komotini	14,158	5,466	562,201	Christodoulos Topsidis (Independent)	€7
	6	Epirus	Ioannina	9,203	3,553	319,991	Alexandros Kahrimanis (ND)	€4
	7	Ionian Islands	Corfu	2,307	891	204,532	Giannis Trepeklis (Independent)	€3
	8	North Aegean	Mytilene	3,836	1,481	194,943	Kostas Moutzouris (Independent)	€2
	9	Peloponnese	Tripoli	15,490	5,981	539,535	Dimitris Ptochos (ND)	€8
	10	South Aegean	Ermoupoli	5,286	2,041	327,820	George Hatzimarkos (ND)	€6
	11	Thessaly	Larissa	14,034	5,420	688,255	Dimitris Kouretas (PASOK–KINAL)	€9
	12	Western Greece	Patras	11,350	4,382	648,220	Nektarios Farmakis (ND)	€8
	13	Western Macedonia	Kozani	9,451	3,649	254,595	Giorgos Amanatidis (ND)	€4
	(14)	Mount Athos	Karyes	390	151	1,746	Alkiviadis Stefanis	—N/a

=== Political parties ===
After the restoration of democracy in 1974–1975, the Greek party system was dominated by the liberal-conservative New Democracy (ND) and the social-democratic Panhellenic Socialist Movement (PASOK). (Note: For a diachronic analysis of the Greek party system, see Pappas 2003, who distinguishes three distinct types of party system which developed in consecutive order, namely, a predominant-party system (from 1952 to 1963), a system of polarised pluralism (between 1963 and 1981), and a two-party system (since 1981).) PASOK and New Democracy largely alternated in power until the outbreak of the government-debt crisis in 2009, whenceforth they experienced a sharp decline in popularity, manifested in the parliamentary elections of May 2012, when the left-wing SYRIZA became the second major party, overtaking PASOK as the main party of the centre-left. After a repeat election in June 2023, New Democracy gained almost 41% of the popular vote and a parliamentary majority of 158 MPs and its leader, Kyriakos Mitsotakis, who had been Prime Minister from 2019 until the inconclusive election of May 2023, was sworn in for a second four-year term. Other parties represented in the Hellenic Parliament are the Communist Party of Greece (KKE), Greek Solution, New Left, Spartans, Victory and Course of Freedom.

=== Foreign relations ===
Representation through: embassy embassy in another country general consulate no representation Greece

Foreign policy is conducted through the Ministry of Foreign Affairs and its head, the Minister for Foreign Affairs, currently Giorgos Gerapetritis. The aims of the Ministry are to represent Greece before other states and international organisations; safeguard the interests of the state and its citizens abroad; promote Greek culture; foster closer relations with the Greek diaspora; and encourage international cooperation. Greece is described as having a special relationship with Cyprus, Italy, France, Armenia, Australia, Israel, the US and the UK.

Following the resolution of the Macedonia naming dispute with the Prespa Agreement in 2018, the Ministry identifies two remaining issues of particular importance to the Greek state: Turkish challenges to Greek sovereignty rights in the Aegean Sea and corresponding airspace, and the Cyprus problem involving the Turkish occupation of Northern Cyprus. There is a long-standing conflict between Turkey and Greece over natural resources in the eastern Mediterranean. Turkey does not recognise a legal continental shelf and exclusive economic zone around the Greek islands.

Due to its geographical proximity to Europe, Asia, the Middle East and Africa, Greece is of geostrategic importance, which it has leveraged to develop a regional policy to promote peace and stability in the Balkans, Mediterranean and the Middle East. This has accorded the country middle power status.

Greece is a member of numerous international organisations, including the Council of Europe, the European Union, the Union for the Mediterranean, NATO, the Organisation internationale de la francophonie and the UN, of which it is a founding member.

=== Military ===
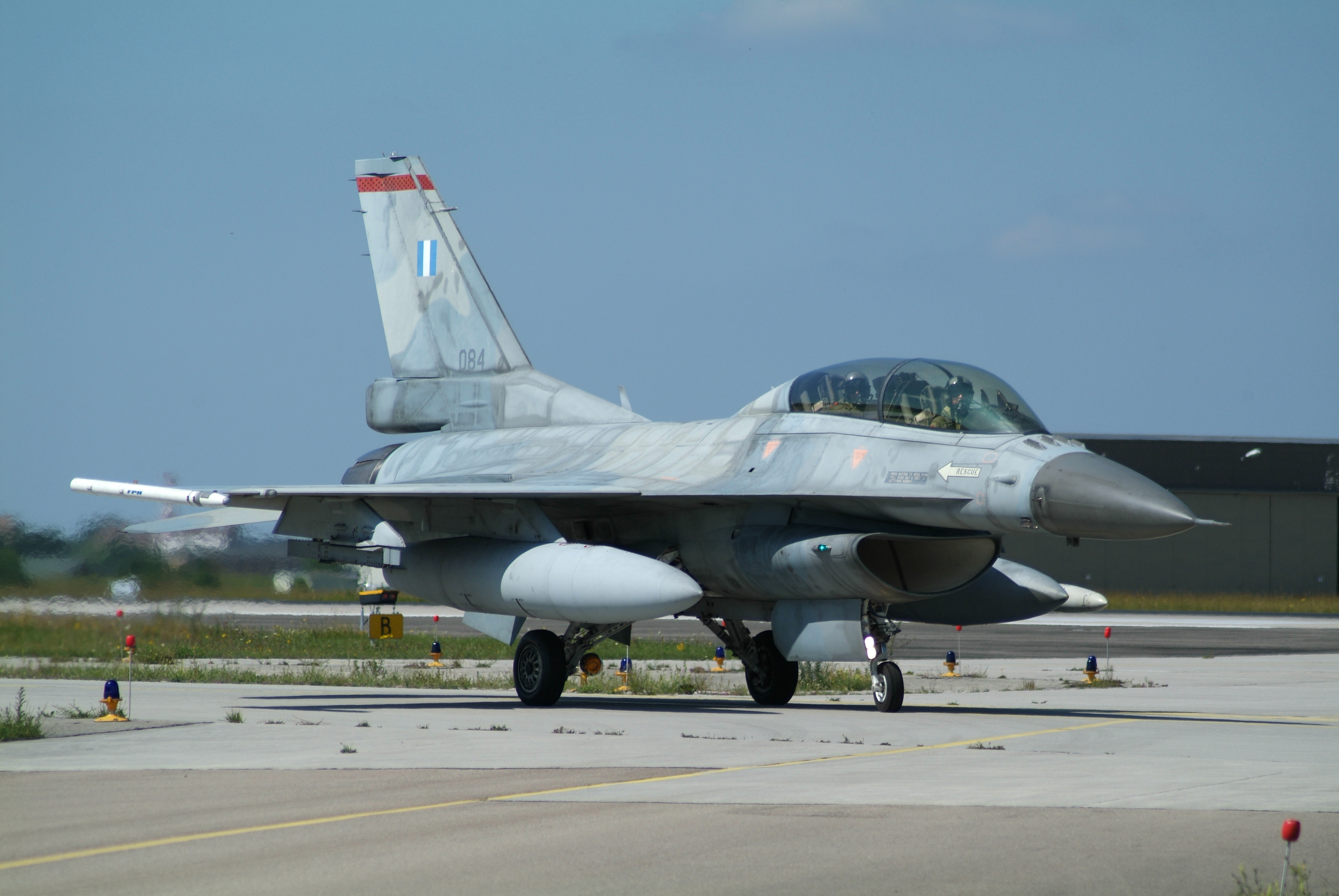
An F-16 Fighting Falcon, the main combat aircraft of the Hellenic Air Force, during an airshow

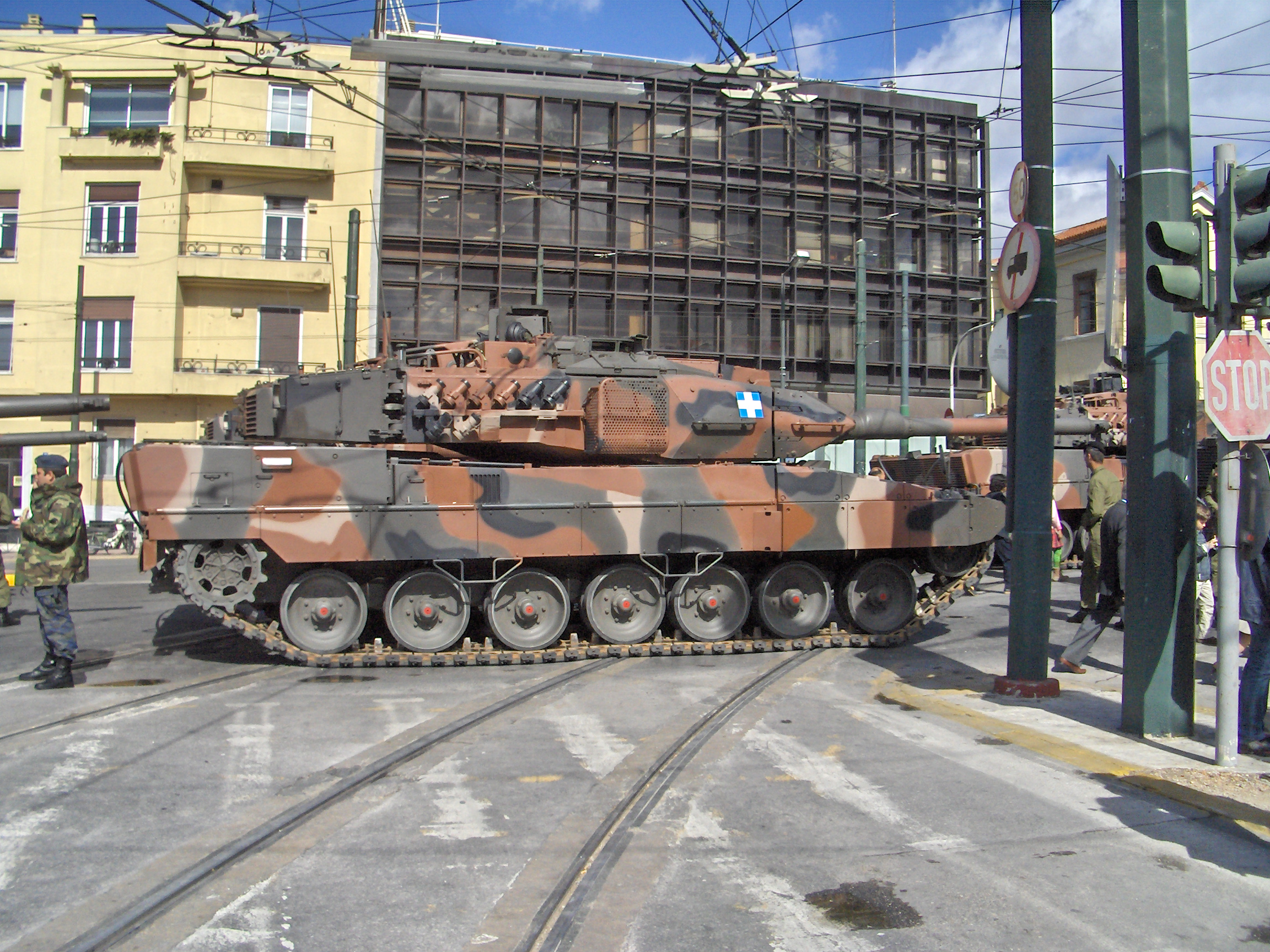
A Leopard 2A6 HEL of the Hellenic Army on parade in Athens

The Hellenic Armed Forces are overseen by the Hellenic National Defence General Staff (Greek: Γενικό Επιτελείο Εθνικής Άμυνας – ΓΕΕΘΑ), with civilian authority vested in the Ministry of National Defence. It consists of three branches: the Hellenic Army (Ellinikos Stratos, ES), the Hellenic Navy (Elliniko Polemiko Navtiko, EPN) and the Hellenic Air Force (Elliniki Polemiki Aeroporia, EPA).

Moreover, Greece maintains the Hellenic Coast Guard for law enforcement at sea, search and rescue, and port operations. Though it can support the navy during wartime, it resides under the authority of the Ministry of Shipping.

Greek military personnel total 364,050, of whom 142,700 are active and 221,350 are reserve. Greece ranks 28th in the world in the number of citizens serving in the armed forces. Mandatory military service is generally one year for 19 to 45 year olds. Additionally, Greek males between the ages of 18 and 60 who live in strategically sensitive areas may be required to serve part-time in the National Guard.

As a member of NATO, the Greek military participates in exercises and deployments under the auspices of the alliance, although its involvement in NATO missions is minimal. Greece spends over US$7 billion annually on its military, or 2.3% of GDP, the 24th-highest in the world in absolute terms, the seventh-highest on a per capita basis, and the second-highest in NATO after the United States. Moreover, Greece is one of only five NATO countries to meet or surpass the minimum defence spending target of 2% of GDP.

=== Law and justice ===
The judiciary is independent of the executive and the legislature and comprises three Supreme Courts: the Supreme Civil and Criminal Court of Greece, the Council of State and the Court of Audit. The judicial system is also composed of civil courts, which judge civil and penal cases and administrative courts, which judge disputes between citizens and the Greek administrative authorities.

The Hellenic Police is the national police force. It is a large agency with its responsibilities ranging from road traffic control to counter-terrorism. It was established in 1984, after the merge of the Hellenic Gendarmerie and the Cities Police forces.

== Economy ==
GDP per capita development

As of 2026, the economy was the 54th largest by purchasing power parity (PPP) at $490.550 billion. In per-person income, Greece is 49th in the world at $47,365. Greece is the 15th largest economy in the 27‑member European Union. The economy is advanced and high-income.

Greece is a developed country with a high standard of living and high ranking in the Human Development Index. Its economy mainly comprises the service sector (85%) and industry (12%), while agriculture makes up 3%. Important Greek industries include tourism (with 33 million international tourists in 2023, it is the 9th most visited country in the world) and merchant shipping (at 18% of the world's total capacity, the Greek merchant marine is the largest in the world), while the country is a considerable agricultural producer (including fisheries) within the union. In 2021 unemployment stood at 13% and youth unemployment at 33%, compared with respectively 7% and 16% in the EU and eurozone.

Greece has the largest economy in the Balkans, and an important regional investor. It has been the number-two foreign investor of capital in Albania and most important trading partner and largest foreign investor in North Macedonia. The Greek telecommunications company OTE has become a strong investor in other Balkan countries.

Greece was a founding member of the OECD and the Organisation of the Black Sea Economic Cooperation (BSEC). In 1979, its accession to the European Communities and the single market was signed, and completed in 1982. Greece was accepted into the Economic and Monetary Union of the European Union in June 2000, and in January 2001 adopted the euro as its currency, replacing the Greek drachma. Greece is a member of the International Monetary Fund and the World Trade Organisation.

=== Debt crisis (2010–2018) ===
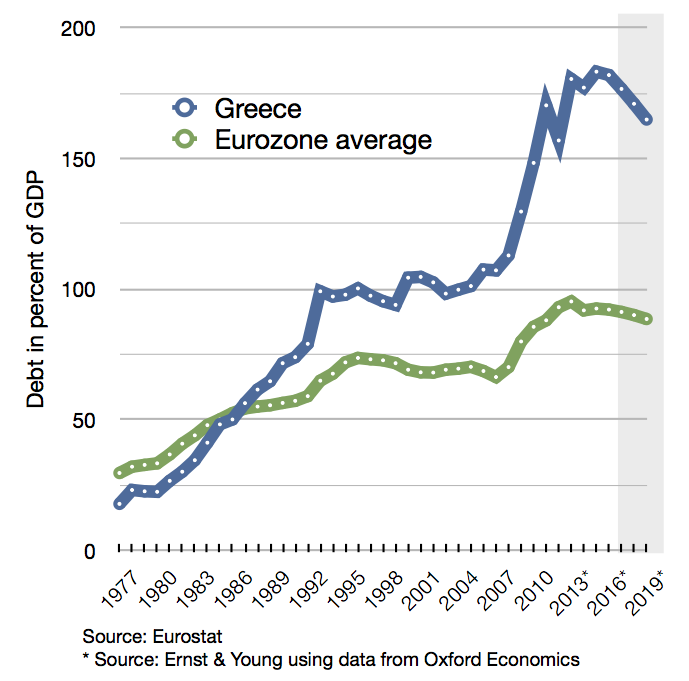
Greece's debt percentage since 1977, compared to the average of the eurozone

Greek economy had fared well (with high growth rates and low public debt) during most of the 20th century; high growth rates were maintained up to the 2008 financial crisis, coupled, however, with high structural deficits. In 2009, it was revealed deficits had been considerably higher than official figures. Banks had supplied cash in exchange for future payments by Greece and other Eurozone countries; in turn the liabilities of the countries were "kept off the books", hiding borrowing levels. This was one of the techniques that enabled Greece to reduce its recorded budget deficit.

The crisis was triggered by the Great Recession, which caused Greece's GDP to contract 2.5% in 2009. Simultaneously, deficits were revealed to have been allowed to reach 10% and 15% in 2008 and 2009. This caused Greece's debt-to-GDP ratio to increase to 127%. As a eurozone member, Greece had no autonomous monetary policy flexibility. Greece's borrowing rates increased, causing a crisis of confidence in Greece's ability to pay back loans in early 2010.

To avert a sovereign default, Greece, other eurozone members, and the International Monetary Fund agreed on a €110 billion rescue package in May 2010. Greece was required to adopt harsh austerity measures to bring its deficit down. A second bail-out of €130 billion was agreed in 2012, subject to financial reforms and further austerity. A debt haircut was agreed. Greece achieved a budget surplus in 2013 and returned to growth in 2014.

Partly due to the imposed austerity, Greece experienced a 25% drop in GDP between 2009 and 2015. The debt ratio, jumped from 127% to about 170%, due to the shrinking economy. In 2013, the IMF admitted it had underestimated the effects of tax hikes and budget cuts and issued an informal apology. The policies have been blamed for worsening the crisis, while others stressed the creditors' share in responsibility. The bailouts ended in 2018.

In 2024, the Greek economy was forecast to grow by nearly 3%, approaching its pre-crisis size of 2009 and far outpacing the eurozone's average economic growth of 0.8%.

In March 2026, it was reported that Greece would repay a further €7 billion from its first bailout package ahead of schedule as part of a broader effort to improve its financial standing and reduce debt. This follows previous earlier repayments to EU creditors, as well as completion of repayment of Greece's loans to the International Monetary Fund two years ahead of schedule in 2022. The early debt repayments were seen as part of the country's remarkable recovery following the end of the crisis in 2018.

=== Industry ===
Industrial activity was evident in Greece, since at least the second half of the 19th century (including heavy industry such as shipbuilding), mainly centered in Ermoupolis and Piraeus. Manufacturing output increased significantly during the period of Greece's rapid economic growth (1950-1973), followed by a sharp decline after 1980 when services, as in other parts of the world, rapidly replaced manufacturing. The value added by the manufacturing sector as a percentage of GDP in Greece has remained lower than in most European countries (see Table).

Value added by the manufacturing sector as % of GDP (Greece vs main European economies, 2023)
Country	Value added by manufacturing (% of GDP)
Germany	18.36
Italy	15.26
Spain	10.89
Netherlands	10.84
France	9.73
Greece	8.73
United Kingdom	8.28

In 2025 Greece's main exports were refined petroleum products (26.2%), food products (18.6%), manufactured goods (15.5%), chemicals (13%), and machinery and transport equipment (9.9%).

=== Agriculture ===
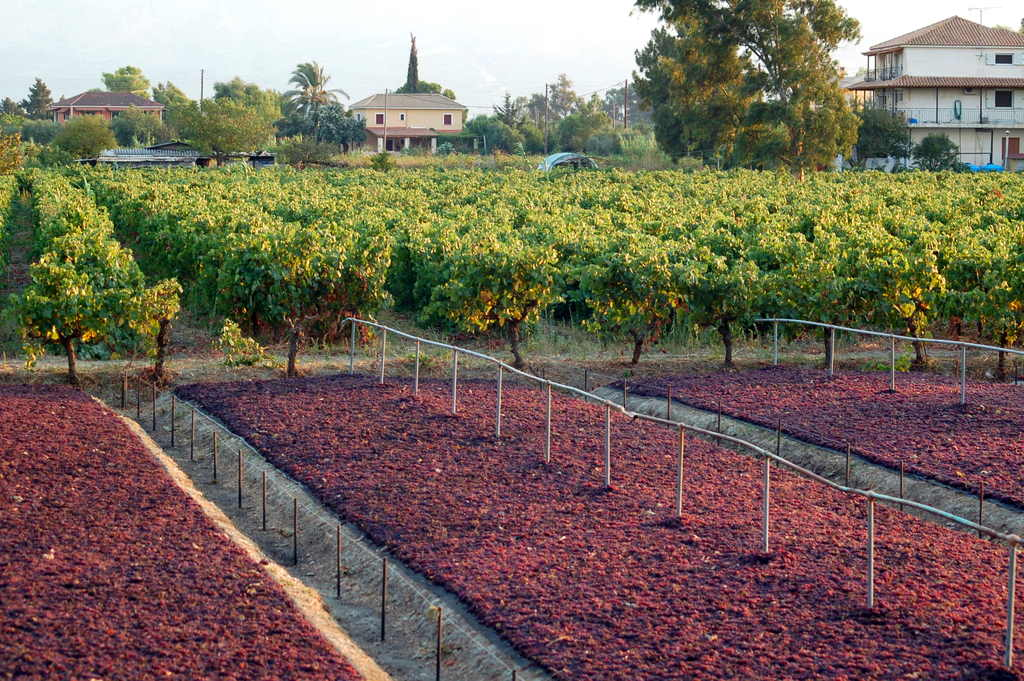
Sun-drying of Zante currant on Zakynthos

Greece is the European Union's largest producer of cotton and pistachios (7,200 tons in 2021), second in olives (3m tons in 2021), third in figs (8,400 tons in 2022) and watermelons (440,000 tons in 2022) and fourth in almonds (40,000 tons in 2022). Agriculture contributes 3.8% of GDP and employs 12% of the labour force.

Greece is a major beneficiary of the EU's Common Agricultural Policy. As a result of entry to the European Community, much of its agricultural infrastructure has been upgraded and output increased.

=== Energy ===
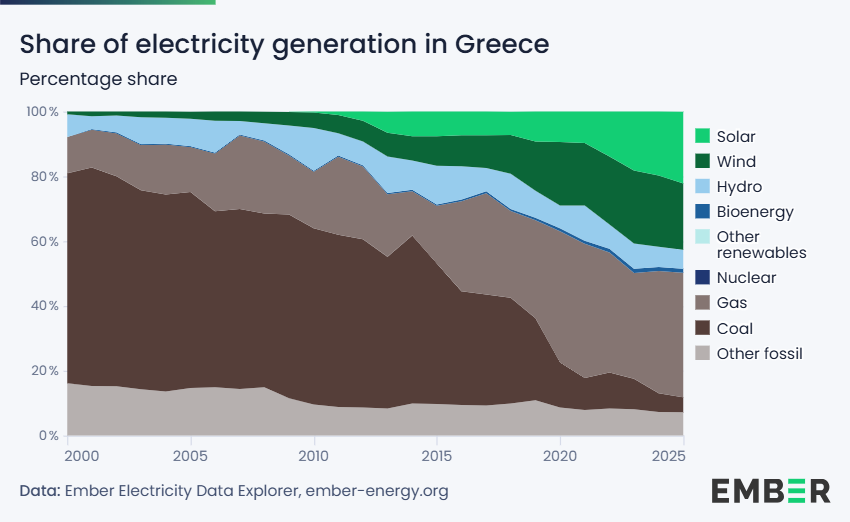
Electricity generation in Greece - percentage share

Electricity production is dominated by the state-owned Public Power Corporation (known by its acronym ΔΕΗ, transliterated as DEI), which supplied 75% of electricity in 2021. Some of DEI's output is generated using lignite. Renewable energy in Greece accounted for 46% of Greece's electricity in 2022, a rise from the 11% in 2011. Wind power accounts for 22%, solar power 14%, hydropower 9%, and natural gas 38%. Independent companies' energy production has increased. Greece does not have any nuclear power plants. During the 2nd Nuclear Energy Summit in Paris, Kyriakos Mitsotakis announced that Greece will begin exploring the possibility of using nuclear energy, especially Small Modular Reactors (SMRs), as part of its future energy mix.

=== Maritime ===
The shipping industry has been a key element of economic activity since ancient times. Shipping remains one of the country's most important industries, accounting for 5% of GDP and employing about 160,000 people (4% of the workforce).

The Greek Merchant Navy is the largest in the world at 18% of global capacity. The merchant fleet ranks first in tonnage (384 million dwt), 2nd in number of ships (at 4,870), first in tankers and dry bulk carriers, fourth in the number of containers, and fifth in other ships. The number of ships flying a Greek flag (includes non-Greek fleets) is 1,517, or 5% of the world's tonnage (ranked fifth globally). Today's fleet is smaller than an all-time high of 5,000 ships in the late 1970s. During the 1960s, the Greek fleet nearly doubled, through the investment undertaken by the shipping magnates, Aristotle Onassis and Stavros Niarchos. The modern Greek maritime industry was formed after World War II when Greek shipping businessmen were able to amass surplus ships sold by the U.S. government through the Ship Sales Act of the 1940s.

Greece has a significant shipbuilding and ship maintenance industry. The six shipyards around the port of Piraeus are among the largest in Europe. Greece has become a leader in the construction and maintenance of luxury yachts.

=== Tourism ===
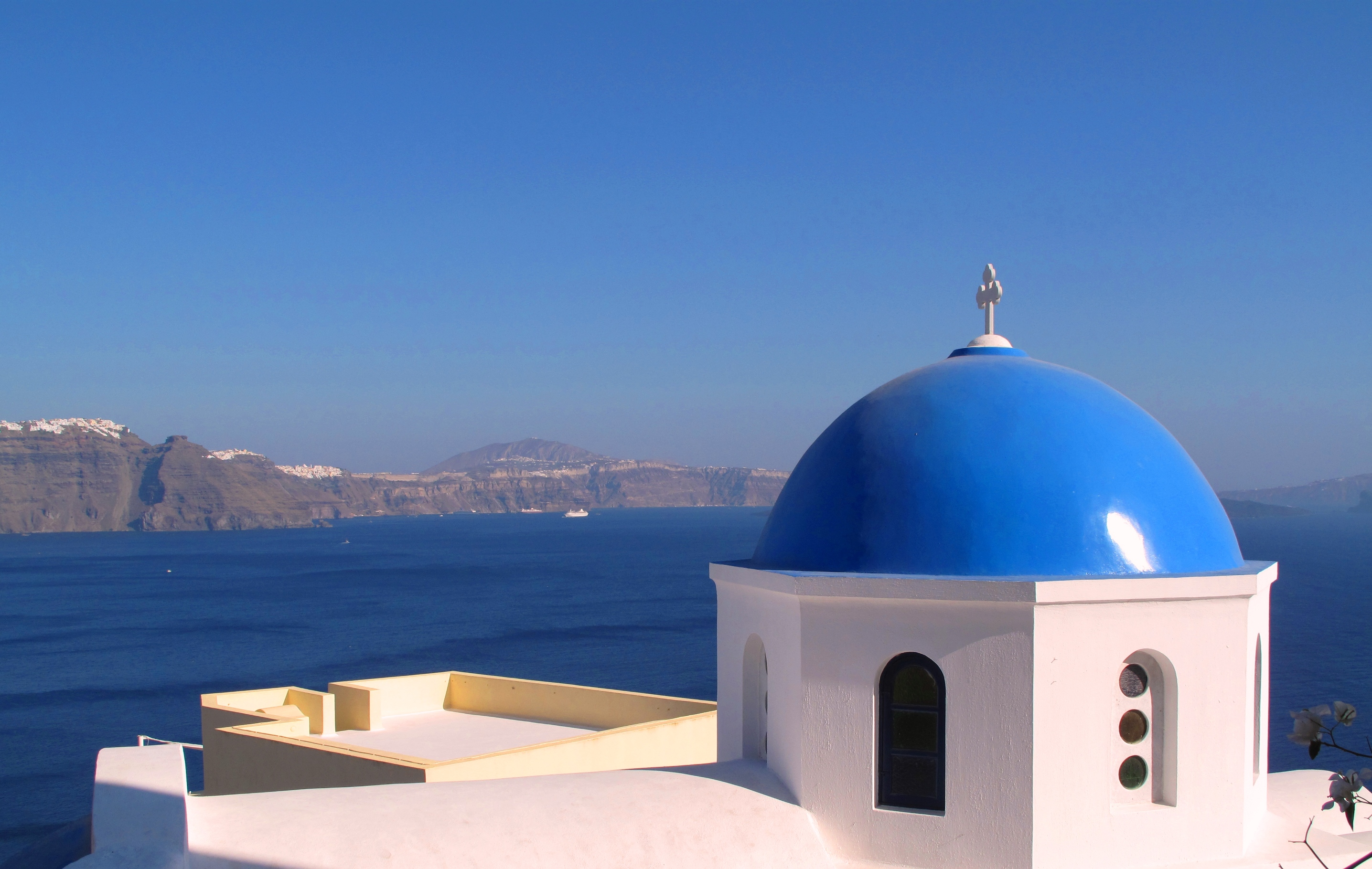
Santorini, a popular tourist destination, is ranked as the world's top island in many travel magazines and sites.

Tourism has been a key element of the economy and one of the most important sectors, contributing 21% of gross domestic product in 2018. Greece was the 9th most visited country in the world in 2022, hosting 28 million visitors, an increase from 18 million tourists in 2007.

Most visitors come from the European continent, while the most from a single nationality are from the United Kingdom, followed by Germany. The most visited region of Greece is Central Macedonia.

In 2011, Santorini was voted as "The World's Best Island" in Travel + Leisure. Its neighbouring island Mykonos, came in fifth in the European category. There are 21 UNESCO World Heritage Sites in Greece, and Greece is ranked 17th in the world in total sites. Eleven further sites are on the tentative list, awaiting nomination.

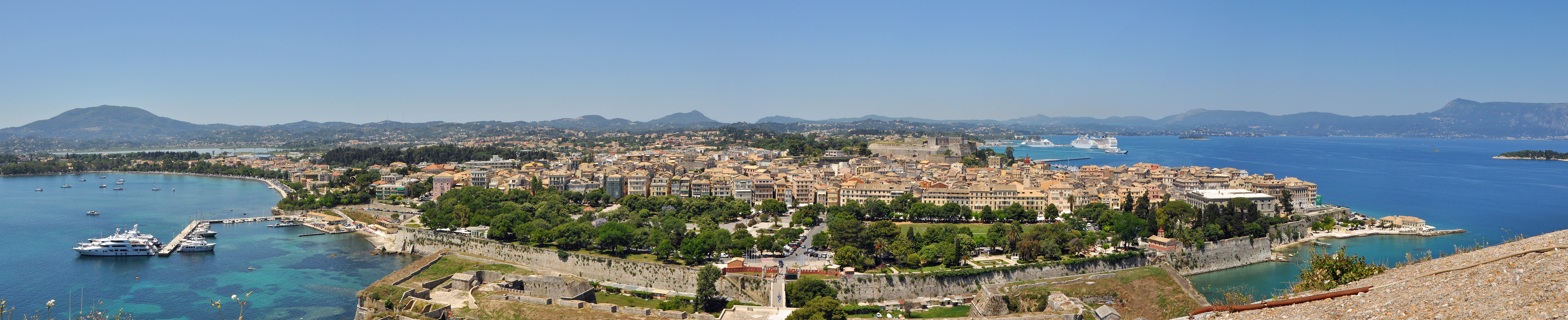
Panoramic view of the old Corfu City, a UNESCO World Heritage Site, as seen from the Old Fortress. The Bay of Garitsa is to the left and the port of Corfu is just visible on the top right. Spianada Square is in the foreground.

=== Transport ===
The Rio–Antirrio bridge connects mainland Greece to the Peloponnese

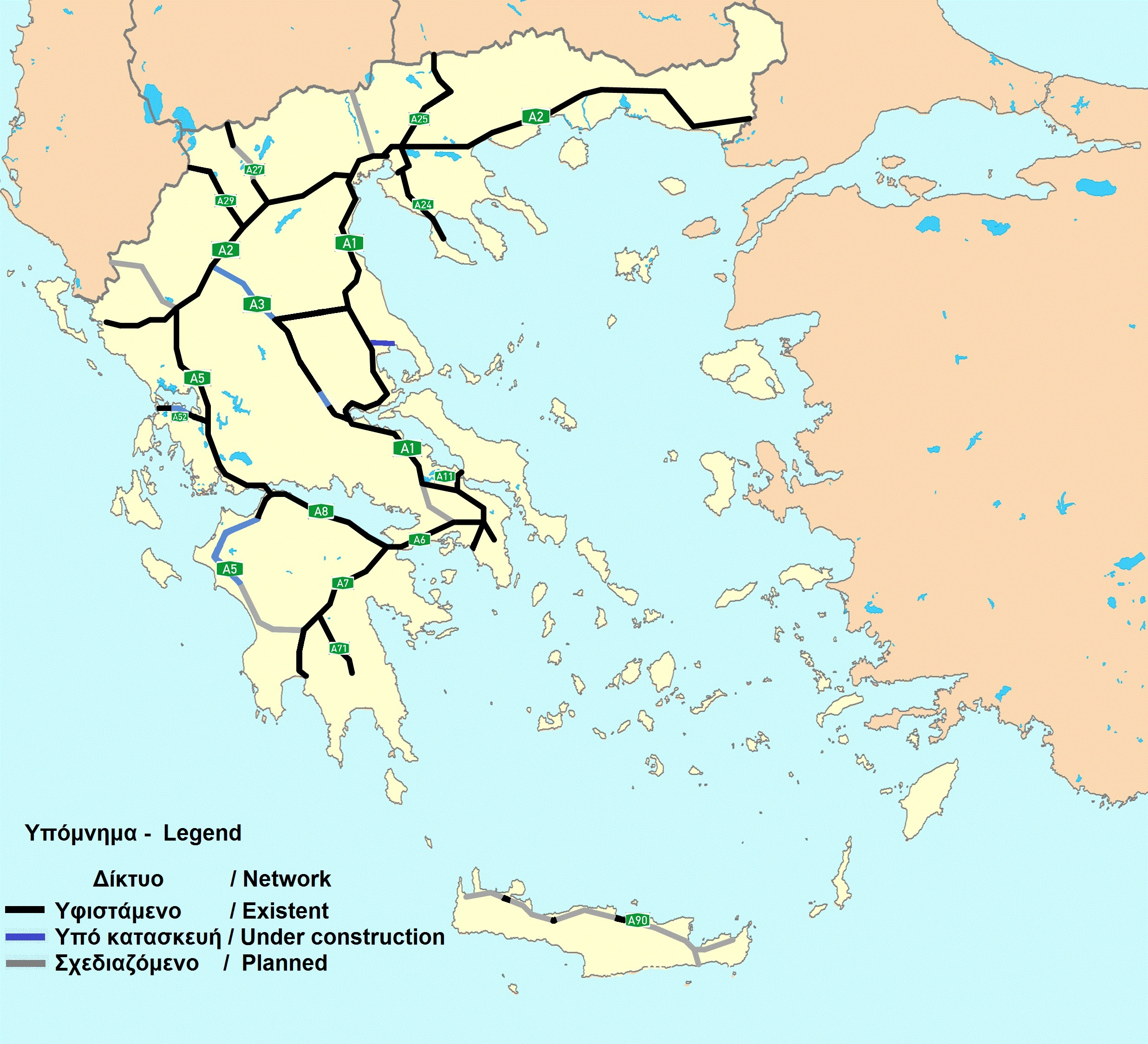
Map of Greece's motorway network as of 2022. Black=Completed routes, Blue=Under Construction, Grey=Planned routes

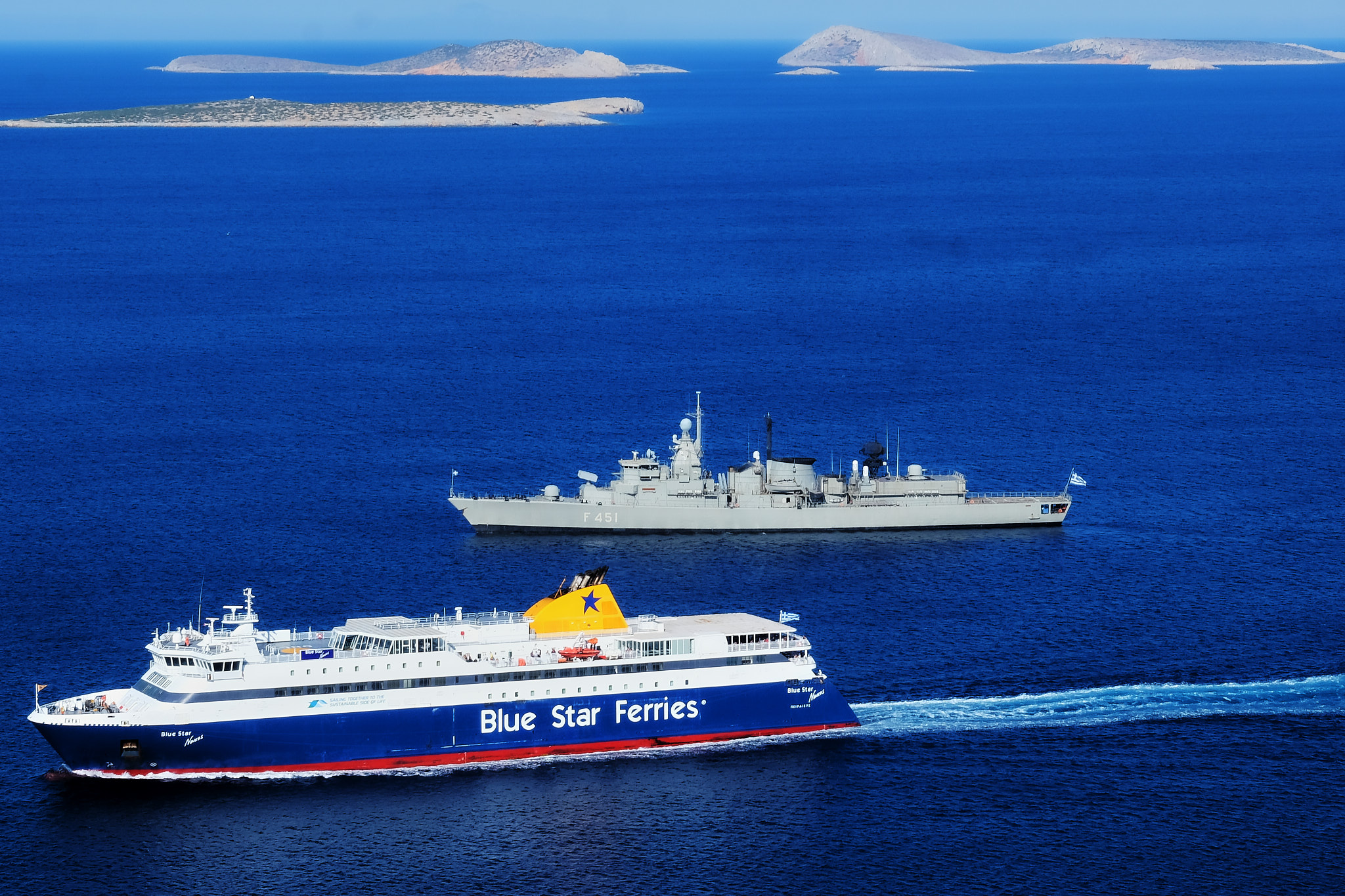
A Blue Star Ferries vessel and a Greek navy ship.

Since the 1980s, the road and rail network has been modernised. With a total length of about 2,320 km (1,440 mi) as of 2020, Greece's motorway network is the most extensive in Southeastern Europe and one of the most advanced in Europe, including the east–west A2 (Egnatia Odos) in northern Greece, the north–south A1 (Athens–Thessaloniki–Evzonoi, AThE) along the mainland's eastern coastline and the A5 (Ionia Odos) along the western coastline, leading to the Rio–Antirrio bridge, the longest suspension cable bridge in Europe (2,250 m (7,382 ft) long), connecting Rio in the Peloponnese with Antirrio in western Greece. The Athens Metropolitan Area is served by the privately run Attiki Odos (A6/A62/A621/A64/A65) motorway network and the expanded Athens Metro system, while the Thessaloniki Metro was launched in 2024.

Railway connections play a smaller role than in many other European countries but have been expanded, with new suburban/commuter rail connections, served by Proastiakos around Athens, Thessaloniki, and Patras. A modern intercity rail connection between Athens and Thessaloniki has been established, while an upgrade to double lines in many parts of the 2,500 km (1,600 mi) network is underway; along with a new double track, standard gauge railway between Athens and Patras (replacing the old metre-gauge Piraeus–Patras railway) which is under construction and opening in stages. International railway lines connect Greek cities with the rest of Europe, the Balkans and Turkey.

All major islands are served by ferries to the mainland. Piraeus, the port of Athens, was the third busiest passenger port in Europe as of 2021. 37 million passengers travelled by boat in Greece in 2019, the second-highest in Europe. Greece has 39 active airports, 15 of which serve international destinations. Athens International Airport served over 28 million passengers in 2023. Most Greek islands and main cities are connected by air by the three major airlines: Olympic Air, Aegean Airlines and Sky Express.

=== Telecommunications ===
Modern digital information and communication networks reach all areas. There are over 35,000 km (21,748 mi) of fiber optics and an extensive open-wire network. Broadband internet availability is widespread in Greece: there were a total of 2,252,653 broadband connections as of early 2011, translating to 20% broadband penetration. In 2017 around 82% of the population used the internet regularly.

Internet cafés that provide net access, office applications and multiplayer gaming are a common sight, while mobile internet on 3G and 4G- LTE cellphone networks and Wi-Fi connections can be found almost everywhere. As of July 2022, 5G service is accessible in most of major cities. The UN ranks Greece among the top 30 countries with a highly developed information and communications infrastructure.

=== Science and technology ===
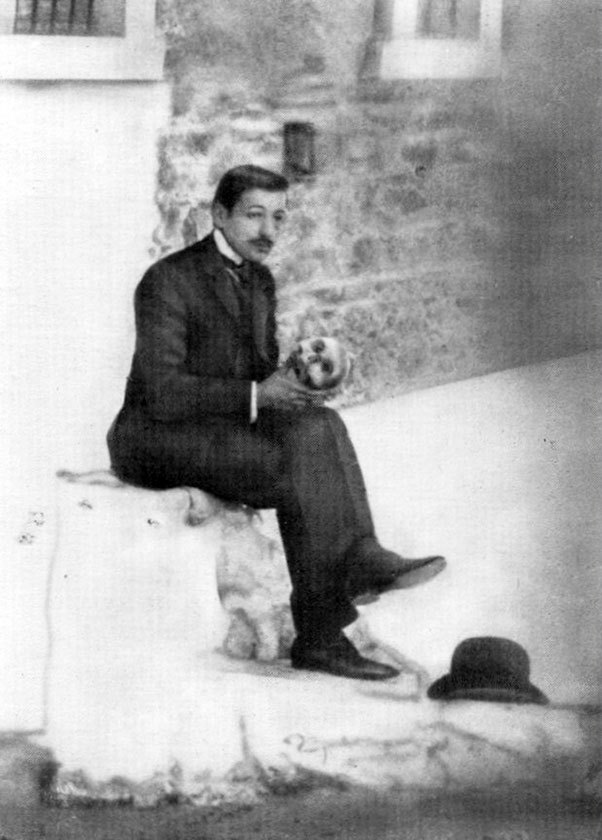
Georgios Papanikolaou, a pioneer in cytopathology and early cancer detection

The General Secretariat for Research and Technology of the Ministry of Development and Competitiveness is responsible for designing, implementing and supervising national research and technological policy. In 2017, spending on research and development (R&D) reached an all-time high of €2 billion, equal to 1.1% of GDP.

Greece was ranked 42nd in the Global Innovation Index in 2025.

Greece has major technology parks with incubator facilities. The Hellenic National Space Committee began cooperating with the European Space Agency (ESA) in 1994 and has been its member since 2005. The country participates in the ESA's telecommunication and technology activities and the Global Monitoring for Environment and Security Initiative. The National Centre of Scientific Research "Demokritos" was founded in 1959 and is the largest multidisciplinary research centre in Greece. Its activities cover several fields of science and engineering.

Greece has one of the highest rates of tertiary enrollment in the world, while Greeks are well represented in academia worldwide; leading Western universities employ a disproportionately high number of Greek faculty. Greek scientific publications have grown significantly in terms of research impact, surpassing both the EU and global average from 2012 to 2016.

Notable Greek scientists of modern times include Georgios Papanikolaou (inventor of the Pap test), mathematician Constantin Carathéodory (known for the Carathéodory theorems and Carathéodory conjecture), astronomer E. M. Antoniadi, archaeologists Ioannis Svoronos, Valerios Stais, Spyridon Marinatos, Manolis Andronikos (discovered the tomb of Philip II of Macedon in Vergina), Indologist Dimitrios Galanos, botanist Theodoros G. Orphanides, and scientists such as Michael Dertouzos, Nicholas Negroponte, John Argyris, John Iliopoulos (2007 Dirac Prize for his contributions on the physics of the charm quark), Joseph Sifakis (2007 Turing Award, the "Nobel Prize" of Computer Science), Christos Papadimitriou (2002 Knuth Prize, 2012 Gödel Prize), Mihalis Yannakakis (2005 Knuth Prize) and physicist Dimitri Nanopoulos.

== Demographics ==
Eurostat estimated the Greek population at 10.6 million in 2022.

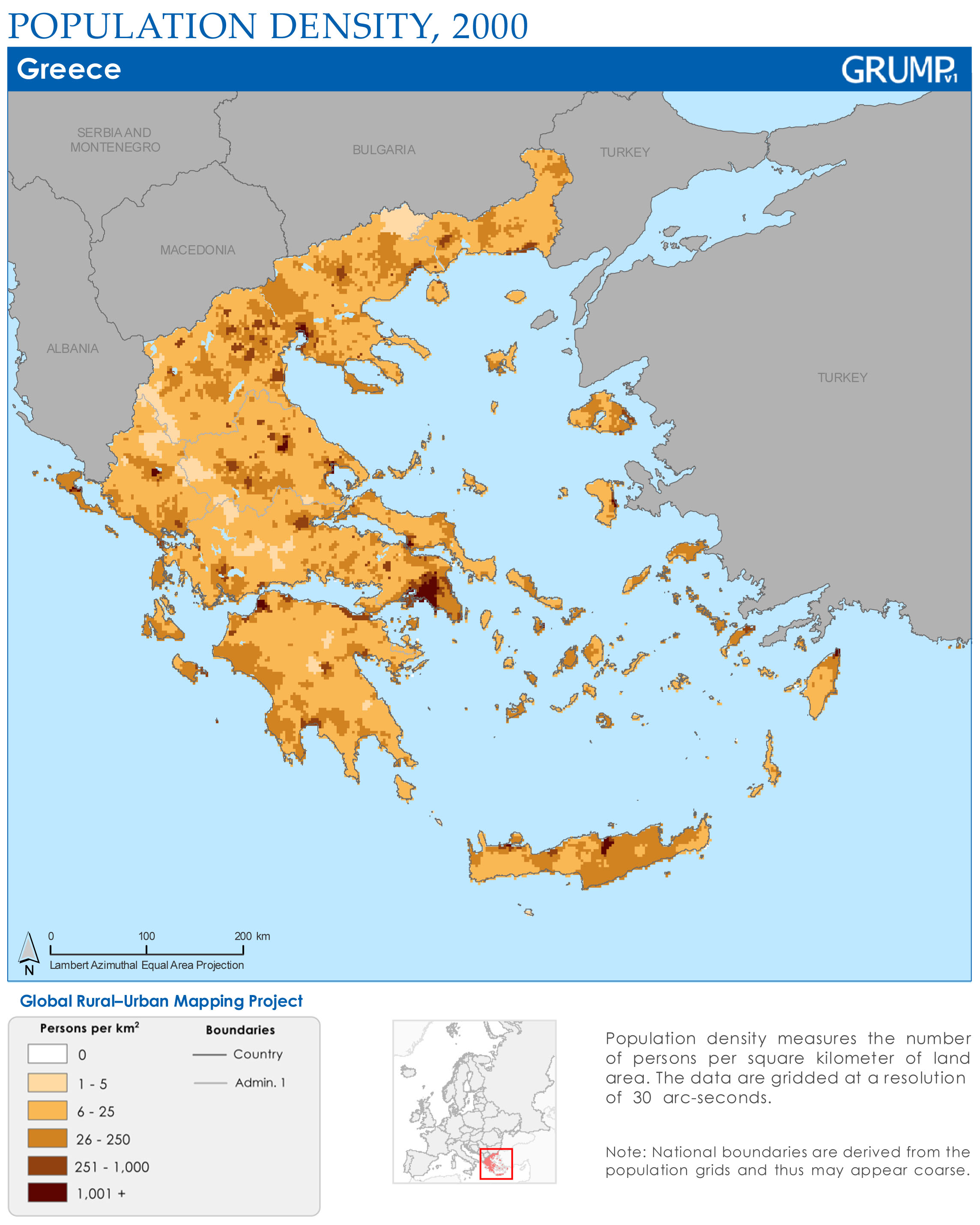
Greece population density, 2000

Greek society has changed significantly over recent decades, coinciding with the broader European trend of declining fertility and population aging. The fertility rate of 1.4 children per woman is well below the replacement rate of 2.1, and one of the lowest in the world, considerably below the high of 5.5 children in 1900. The crude birth rate in 2023 was 6.8 per 1,000 inhabitants, a significant decline from 8.5 per 1,000 in 2016 and 14.5 in 1981. The mortality rate in 2025 is 11.53 per 1,000 compared to 11.2 in 2016 and 8.9 in 1981.

Greece's median age is 44.2 years, the seventh highest in the world. In 2001, 17% of the population were 65 years old and older, 68% between the ages of 15 and 64 years old, and 15% were 14 years old and younger. By 2023, those aged 65 and older had risen to 25.4%, while those aged 14 and younger declined to 6.4%; the population aged 15 to 64 rose slightly to 68.2%. Marriage rates began declining from almost 71 per 1,000 inhabitants in 1981 to 51 in 2004. Divorce rates have increased from 32.8 per 100 marriages in 2018 to 33.4 in 2022, albeit declining from the peak of 41.2 in 2020.

As a result of these trends, the average household is smaller and older than in previous generations. The economic crisis exacerbated this development, with 350,000–450,000 Greeks, predominantly young adults, emigrating since 2010, when the population reached its peak of 11.1 million. Based on current trends, the Greek population is projected to fall to 7.5 million by 2050.

=== Cities ===
Almost two-thirds of the Greek people live in urban areas. Greece's largest and most influential metropolitan centres are Athens (population 3,744,059 according to 2021 census) and Thessaloniki (population 1,092,919 in 2021), that latter commonly referred to as the symprotévousa (συμπρωτεύουσα, lit. 'co-capital'). Other prominent cities with populations above 100,000 inhabitants include Patras, Heraklion, Larissa, Volos, Rhodes, Ioannina, Agrinio, Chania, and Chalcis.

Largest cities or towns in Greece Hellenic Statistical Authority 2021 census
Rank	Name	Region	Pop.	Rank	Name	Region	Pop.
1	Athens	Attica	3,287,653	11	Alexandroupoli	Eastern Macedonia and Thrace	59,476
2	Thessaloniki	Central Macedonia	784,948	12	Xanthi	Eastern Macedonia and Thrace	59,352
3	Patras	Western Greece	188,946	13	Kalamata	Peloponnese	57,706
4	Heraklion	Crete	171,995	14	Katerini	Central Macedonia	56,961
5	Larissa	Thessaly	154,637	15	Agrinio	Western Greece	56,594
6	Volos	Thessaly	117,487	16	Rhodes	South Aegean	54,562
7	Ioannina	Epirus	80,455	17	Chania	Crete	54,559
8	Chalcis	Central Greece	64,490	18	Kavala	Eastern Macedonia and Thrace	51,947
9	Serres	Central Macedonia	61,924	19	Komotini	Eastern Macedonia and Thrace	51,732
10	Trikala	Thessaly	61,608	20	Lamia	Central Greece	47,529

=== Languages ===
Regions with a traditional presence of languages other than Greek. Today, Greek is the dominant language throughout the country.

Greece is relatively homogeneous in linguistic terms, with a large majority of the native population using Greek as their first or only language. Among the Greek-speaking population, speakers of the distinctive Pontic dialect came to Greece from Asia Minor after the Greek genocide and constitute a sizeable group. The Cappadocian dialect came due to the genocide as well, but is endangered and barely spoken. Indigenous Greek dialects include the archaic Greek spoken by the Sarakatsani, traditionally transhumant mountain shepherds of Greek Macedonia and other parts of Northern Greece. The Tsakonian language, a distinct Greek language derived from Doric Greek instead of Koine Greek, is still spoken in villages in the southeastern Peloponnese.

The Muslim minority in Thrace, approximately 0.95% of the population, consists of speakers of Turkish, Bulgarian (Pomaks) and Romani. Romani is spoken by Christian Roma in other parts of the country. The Council of Europe has estimated that there are approximately 265,000 Romani people living in Greece (2.47% of the population). Other minority languages have traditionally been spoken by regional population groups in various areas. Their use decreased radically in the course of the 20th century through assimilation with the Greek-speaking majority. They are only maintained by the older generations and almost extinct. The same is true for the Arvanites, an Albanian-speaking group mostly located in rural areas around Athens, and for the Aromanians and Megleno-Romanians whose language is closely related to Romanian and who used to live scattered across areas of mountainous central Greece. Members of these groups usually identify ethnically as Greek and are bilingual in Greek.

Near the northern Greek borders there are some Slavic–speaking groups, most of whom identify ethnically as Greeks. It is estimated that after the population exchanges of 1923, Macedonia had 200,000 to 400,000 Slavic speakers. The Jewish community traditionally spoke Ladino (Judeo-Spanish), today maintained by a few thousand speakers. Other notable minority languages include Armenian, Georgian, and the Greco-Turkic dialect spoken by the Urums, a community of Caucasus Greeks from the Tsalka region of central Georgia and ethnic Greeks from southeastern Ukraine who arrived in Northern Greece as economic migrants in the 1990s.

=== Migration ===
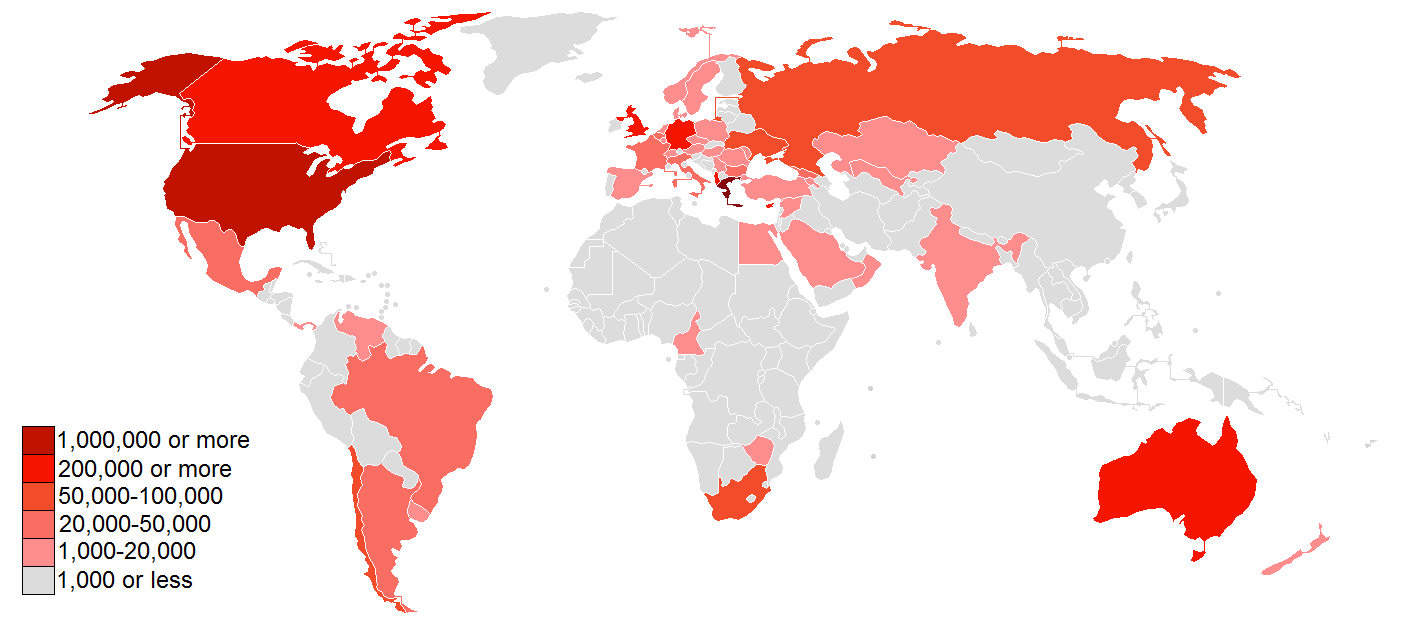
A map of the fifty countries with the largest Greek diaspora communities

Throughout the 20th century, millions of Greeks migrated to the United States, United Kingdom, Australia, Canada, and Germany, creating a large Greek diaspora. Net migration started to show positive numbers from the 1970s, but until the beginning of the 1990s, the main influx was returning Greek migrants or of Pontic Greeks and others from Russia, Georgia, Turkey the Czech Republic, and elsewhere in the former Soviet Bloc.

A study from the Mediterranean Migration Observatory maintains that the 2001 census recorded 762,191 persons residing in Greece without Greek citizenship, constituting around 7% of the population. Of the non-citizen residents, 48,560 were EU or European Free Trade Association nationals and 17,426 were Cypriots with privileged status. The majority came from Eastern European countries: Albania (56%), Bulgaria (5%), and Romania (3%), while migrants from the former Soviet Union (Georgia, Russia, Ukraine, Moldova, etc.) comprised 10% of the total. The total Albanian national population, which included temporary migrants and undocumented persons, was around 600,000.

The 2011 census recorded 9,903,268 Greek citizens (92%), 480,824 Albanian citizens (4.4%), 75,915 Bulgarian citizens (0.7%), 46,523 Romanian citizenship (0.4%), 34,177 Pakistani citizens (0.3%), 27,400 Georgian citizens (0.25%) and 247,090 people had other or unidentified citizenship (2%). 189,000 people of the total population of Albanian citizens were reported in 2008 as ethnic Greeks from Southern Albania, in the irredentist region of Northern Epirus.

The greatest cluster of non-EU immigrant population are in the larger urban centres, especially Athens, with 132,000 immigrants comprising 17% of the local population, and then Thessaloniki, with 27,000 immigrants reaching 7% of the local population. There is a considerable number of co-ethnics that came from the Greek communities of Albania and former Soviet Union.

Greece, together with Italy and Spain, is a major entry point for illegal immigrants trying to enter the EU. Illegal immigrants entering mostly do so from the border with Turkey at the Evros River and the islands of the eastern Aegean across from Turkey. In 2012, most illegal immigrants came from Afghanistan, followed by Pakistanis and Bangladeshis. In 2015, arrivals of refugees by sea had increased dramatically due to the Syrian civil war. There were 856,723 arrivals by sea in Greece, an almost fivefold increase to the same period of 2014, of which the Syrians represented almost 45%. Most refugees and migrants use Greece as a transit country to Northern Europe. In July 2025, Greek officials implemented a three month suspension of asylum processing for migrants from North Africa, drawing criticism from human rights groups.

=== Religion ===
Religiosity in Greece (2017):
1. Eastern Orthodoxy (90.0%)
2. Other Christians (exc.Catholics) (3.00%)
3. Irreligion (4.00%)
4. Islam (2.00%)
5. Other religions (inc.Catholics) (1.00%)

The Greek Constitution recognises Eastern Orthodoxy as the 'prevailing' faith of the country, while guaranteeing freedom of religious belief for all. The government does not keep statistics on religious groups and censuses do not ask for religious affiliation. According to the U.S. State Department, an estimated 97% of Greek citizens identify themselves as Eastern Orthodox, belonging to the Greek Orthodox Church, which uses the Byzantine rite and the Greek language, the original language of the New Testament. The administration of the Greek territory is shared between the Church of Greece and the Patriarchate of Constantinople.

In a 2010 Eurostat–Eurobarometer poll, 79% of Greek citizens responded that they "believe there is a God". According to other sources, 16% of Greeks describe themselves as "very religious", which is the highest among all European countries. The survey found just 3.5% never attend a church, compared to 5% in Poland and 59% in the Czech Republic. Estimates of the recognised Muslim minority of Greece, mostly located in Thrace, range around 100,000, about 1% of the population. Some of the Albanian immigrants to Greece come from a nominally Muslim background, though most are secular. Following the 1919–1922 Greco-Turkish War and the 1923 Treaty of Lausanne, Greece and Turkey agreed to a population transfer based on cultural and religious identity. About 500,000 Muslims from Greece, predominantly those defined as Turks, but also Greek Muslims, were exchanged with approximately 1.5 million Greeks from Turkey. However, many refugees who settled in former Ottoman Muslim villages in Central Macedonia, and were defined as Christian Orthodox Caucasus Greeks, arrived from the former Russian Transcaucasus province of Kars Oblast, after it had been retroceded to Turkey prior to the population exchange.

Judaism has been present in Greece for more than 2,000 years. The ancient community of Greek Jews is called Romaniotes, while the Sephardi Jews were once a prominent community in Thessaloniki, numbering some 80,000, or more than half of the population, by 1900. However, after the German occupation of Greece and the Holocaust, it is estimated to number around 5,500 people.

The Roman Catholic community is estimated to be around 250,000 of which 50,000 are Greek citizens. Their community is nominally separate from the smaller Greek Byzantine Catholic Church, which recognises the primacy of the Pope but maintains the liturgy of the Byzantine Rite. Old Calendarists account for 500,000 followers. Protestants, including the Greek Evangelical Church and Free Evangelical Churches, stand at about 30,000. Other Christian minorities, such as Assemblies of God, International Church of the Foursquare Gospel and various Pentecostal churches of the Greek Synod of Apostolic Church total about 12,000 members. The independent Free Apostolic Church of Pentecost is the biggest Protestant denomination in Greece with 120 churches. There are no official statistics about the Free Apostolic Church of Pentecost, but the Orthodox Church estimates the followers as 20,000. The Jehovah's Witnesses report having 28,874 active members.

Since 2017, Hellenic Polytheism, or Hellenism has been legally recognised as an actively practised religion, with estimates of 2,000 active practitioners and an additional 100,000 "sympathisers". Hellenism refers to religious movements that continue, revive, or reconstruct ancient Greek religious practices.

=== Education ===
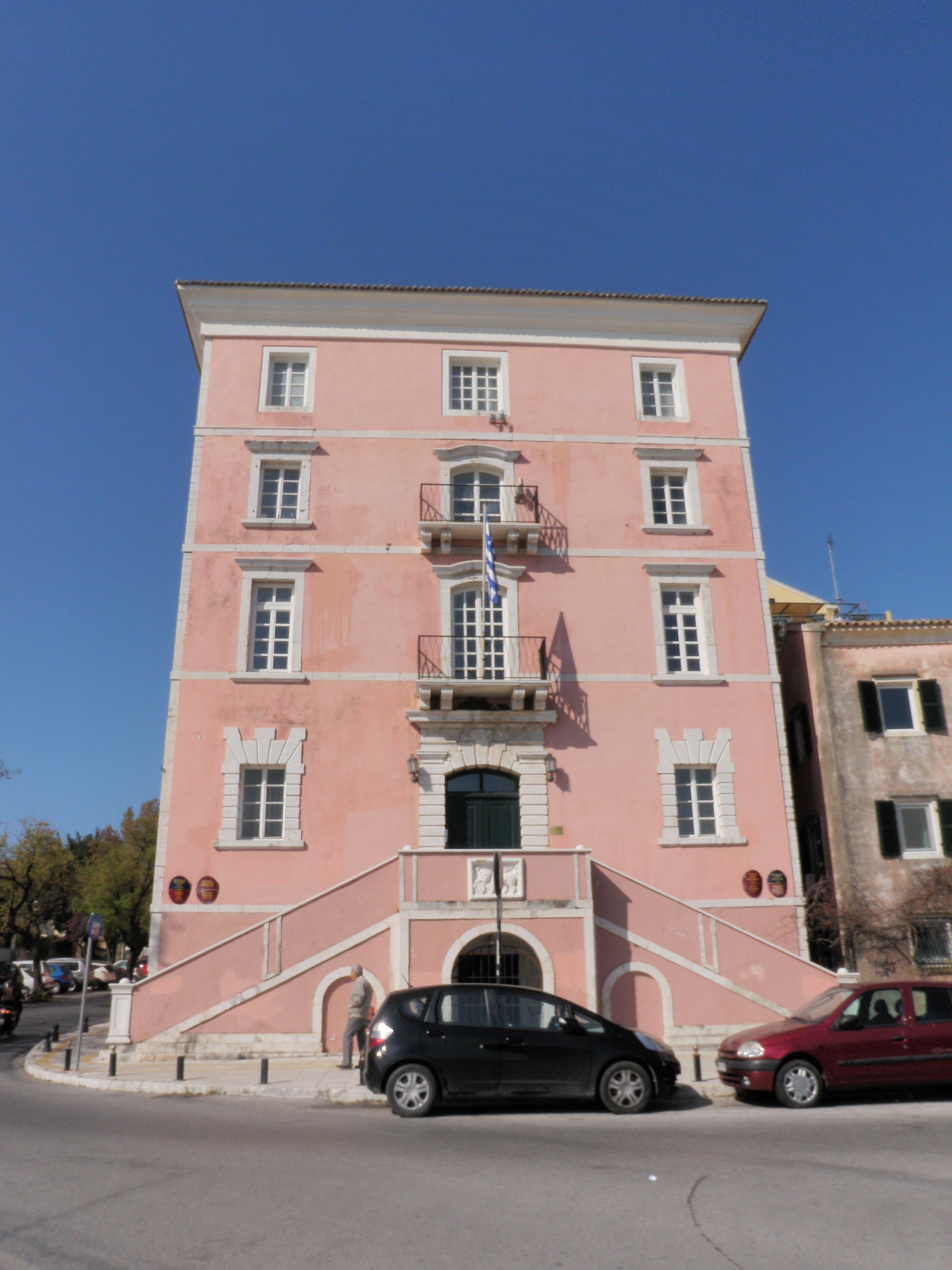
The Ionian Academy in Corfu, the first academic institution of modern Greece

Greeks have a long tradition of valuing and investing in paideia (education), which was upheld as one of the highest societal values in the Greek and Hellenistic world. The first European institution described as a university was founded in fifth-century Constantinople and continued operating in various incarnations until the city's fall to the Ottomans in 1453. The University of Constantinople was Christian Europe's first secular institution of higher learning, and by some measures was the world's first university.

Compulsory education in Greece comprises primary schools (Δημοτικό Σχολείο, Dimotikó Scholeio) and gymnasium (Γυμνάσιο). Nursery schools (Παιδικός σταθμός, Paidikós Stathmós) are popular but not compulsory. Kindergartens (Νηπιαγωγείο, Nipiagogeío) are compulsory for any child above four. Children start primary school aged six and remain there for six years. Attendance at gymnasia starts aged 12 and lasts for three years.

Greece's post-compulsory secondary education consists of two main school types: unified upper secondary schools (Γενικό Λύκειο, Genikό Lykeiό) and technical–vocational schools. The traditional Technical-Vocational Educational Schools (Τεχνικά και Επαγγελματικά Εκπαιδευτήρια, "TEE") have been replaced by two pathways: Vocational Lyceums (Επαγγελματικό Λύκειο, "EPAL") and Vocational Training Schools (Επαγγελματικές Σχολές, "EPAS"). Public higher education consists of Highest Educational Institutions (Ανώτατα Εκπαιδευτικά Ιδρύματα, "ΑΕΙ") and Schools of Advanced Vocational Training (Σχολές Ανώτερης Επαγγελματικής Κατάρτισης, "SAEK"). The Technological Education Institutions (TEI) have been incorporated into existing universities or merged into new universities.

The new National Library of Greece at the Stavros Niarchos Foundation Cultural Centre

The higher education landscape has seen a major shift with the enactment of Law 5094/2024, which for the first time establishes a framework for the licensing and operation of non-profit University-Legal Entities (ULEs) in Greece, affiliated with recognized foreign universities, starting from the 2025–2026 academic year.

Students are admitted to public AEI Institutes according to their performance at national level examinations taking place after completion of the third grade of Lykeio. Students over 22 may be admitted to the Hellenic Open University through a lottery.

The education system provides special kindergartens, primary, and secondary schools for people with special needs or difficulties in learning. There are specialist gymnasia and high schools offering musical, theological, and physical education.

72% of adults aged 25–64 have completed upper secondary education, which is slightly less than the OECD average of 74%. The average Greek pupil scored 458 in reading literacy, maths and science in the OECD's 2015 Programme for International Student Assessment (PISA). This is lower than the OECD average of 486. Girls outperformed boys by 15 points, much more than the average OECD gap of 2.

=== Health ===
Greece has universal health care. The system is mixed, combining a national health service with social health insurance (SHI). Per a 2000 World Health Organisation report, its health system ranked 14th in overall performance of 191 countries surveyed. In a 2013 Save the Children report, Greece was ranked the 19th out of 176 countries for the state of mothers and newborn babies. As of 2014, there were 124 public hospitals, of which 106 were general hospitals and 18 specialised hospitals, with a total capacity of about 30,000 beds.

Greece's health care expenditures was 9.6% of GDP in 2007. By 2015, it declined to 8.4%, compared with the EU average of 9.5%. Nevertheless, the country maintains the highest doctor-to-population ratio of any OECD country and the highest doctor-to-patient ratio in the EU.

Life expectancy is among the highest in the world; life expectancy in 2015 was 81.1 years, slightly above the EU average of 80.6. The island of Icaria has the highest percentage of nonagenarians in the world; 33% of islanders are 90 or older. Icaria is subsequently classified as a "Blue Zone", a region where people allegedly live longer than average and have lower rates of cancer, heart disease, or other chronic illnesses.

A 2011, OECD report showed Greece had the largest percentage of adult daily smokers of any of the 34 OECD members. The obesity rate is 18%, above the OECD average of 15%.

In 2008, infant mortality, with a rate of 3.6 deaths per 1,000 live births, was below the 2007 OECD average of 4.9.

== Culture ==
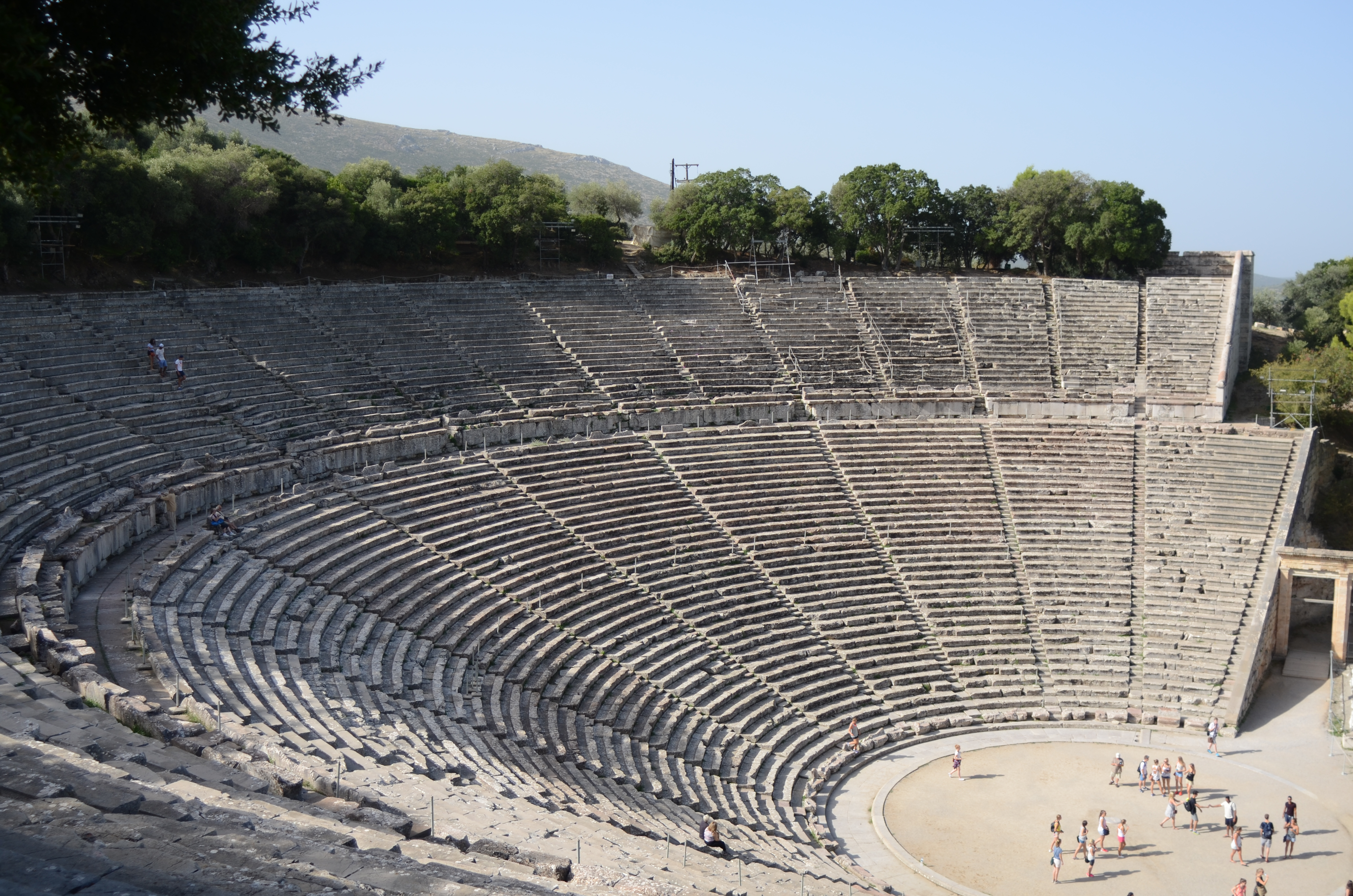
The Ancient Theatre of Epidaurus, annually used for theatrical plays since 1955

The culture of Greece has evolved, beginning in Mycenaean Greece and continuing into Classical Greece, through the influence of the Roman Empire and its Greek Eastern continuation, the Byzantine Empire. Other cultures and nations, such as the Latin and Frankish states, the Ottoman Empire, the Venetian Republic, the Genoese Republic, and the British Empire have left their influence on modern Greek culture, though historians credit the Greek War of Independence with revitalising Greece and giving birth to a single, cohesive entity of its multifaceted culture.

In ancient times, Greece was the birthplace of Western culture. Modern democracies owe a debt to Greek beliefs in government by the people, trial by jury, and equality under the law. The ancient Greeks pioneered in many fields that rely on systematic thought, including logic, biology, geometry, government, geography, medicine, history, philosophy, physics, and mathematics. They introduced important literary forms as epic and lyrical poetry, history, tragedy, comedy and drama. In their pursuit of order and proportion, the Greeks created an ideal of beauty that strongly influenced Western art.

=== Visual arts ===
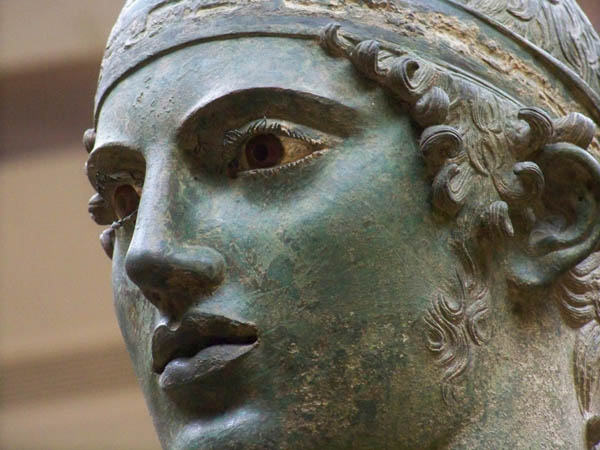
Close-up of the Charioteer of Delphi, a celebrated statue from the 5th century BC

Artistic production in Greece began in the prehistoric pre-Greek Cycladic and the Minoan civilisations, both of which were influenced by local traditions and the art of ancient Egypt.

There were interconnected traditions of painting in ancient Greece. Due to technical differences, they underwent differentiated developments. Not all painting techniques are equally well represented in the archaeological record. The most respected form of art, according to Pliny or Pausanias, were individual, mobile paintings on wooden boards, described as panel paintings. Wall painting in Greece goes back at least to the Minoan and Mycenaean civilisations, with the lavish fresco decoration of sites like Knossos, Tiryns, and Mycenae.

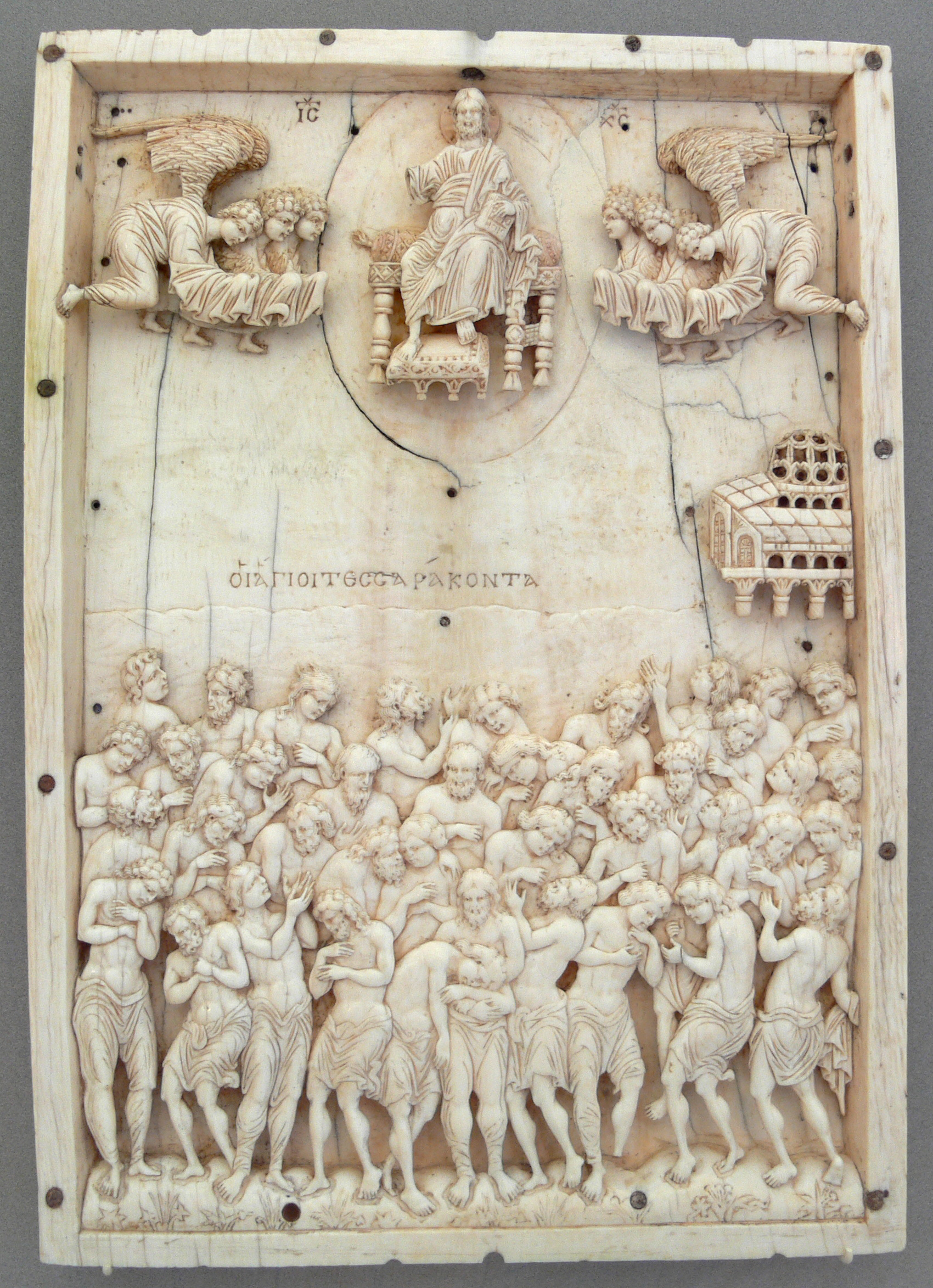
An example of Macedonian-era ivorywork from Constantinople: the Forty Martyrs of Sebaste, now in the Bode Museum, Berlin

Ancient Greek sculpture was composed almost entirely of workable and durable materials, marble or bronze, bronze becoming the favoured medium for major works by the early 5th century, while chryselephantine sculptures, made largely of gold and ivory and used for temple cult images and luxury works, were much rarer. It has been established that ancient Greek sculptures were painted with a variety of colours, a feature known as polychromy.

Art production continued during the Byzantine era. The most salient feature of this new aesthetic was its "abstract", or anti-naturalistic character. While classical art was marked by attempts to create representations that mimicked reality, Byzantine art favoured a more symbolic approach. Byzantine painting concentrated mainly on icons and hagiographies. The Macedonian art (Byzantine) was the artistic expression of the Macedonian Renaissance, a label used to describe the Macedonian dynasty of the Byzantine Empire (867–1056), which scholars have seen as a time of increased interest in classical scholarship and the assimilation of classical motifs into Christian artwork.

Post Byzantine art schools include the Cretan School and Heptanese School. The first artistic movement in the Greek Kingdom can be considered the Greek academic art of the 19th century (Munich School). Modern Greek painters include Nikolaos Gyzis, Georgios Jakobides, Theodoros Vryzakis, Nikiforos Lytras, Konstantinos Volanakis, Nikos Engonopoulos and Yannis Tsarouchis, while notable sculptors are Pavlos Prosalentis, Ioannis Kossos, Leonidas Drosis, Georgios Bonanos, and Yannoulis Chalepas.

=== Architecture ===
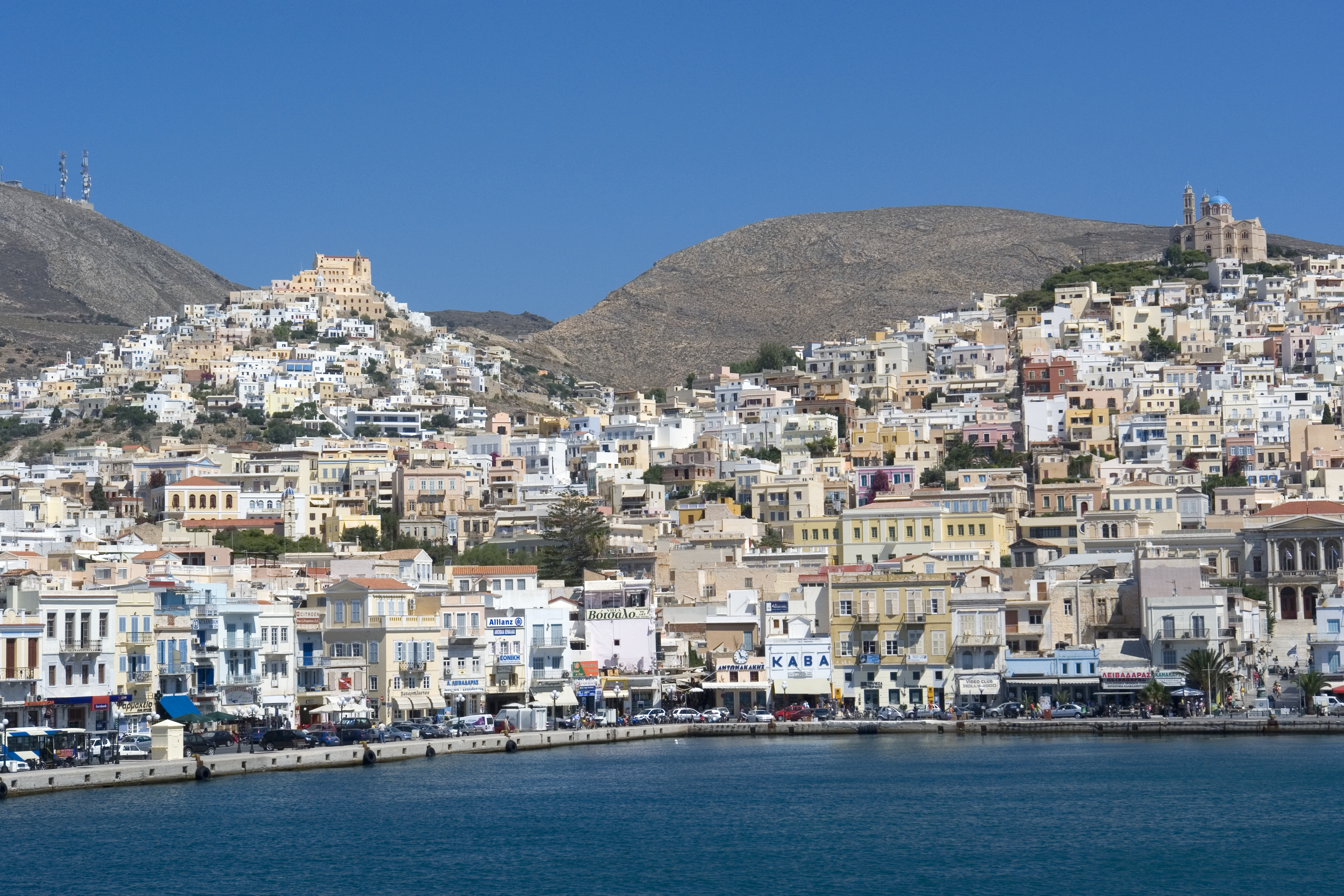
Harbour of Ermoupolis, on the island Syros, first capital of independent Greece.

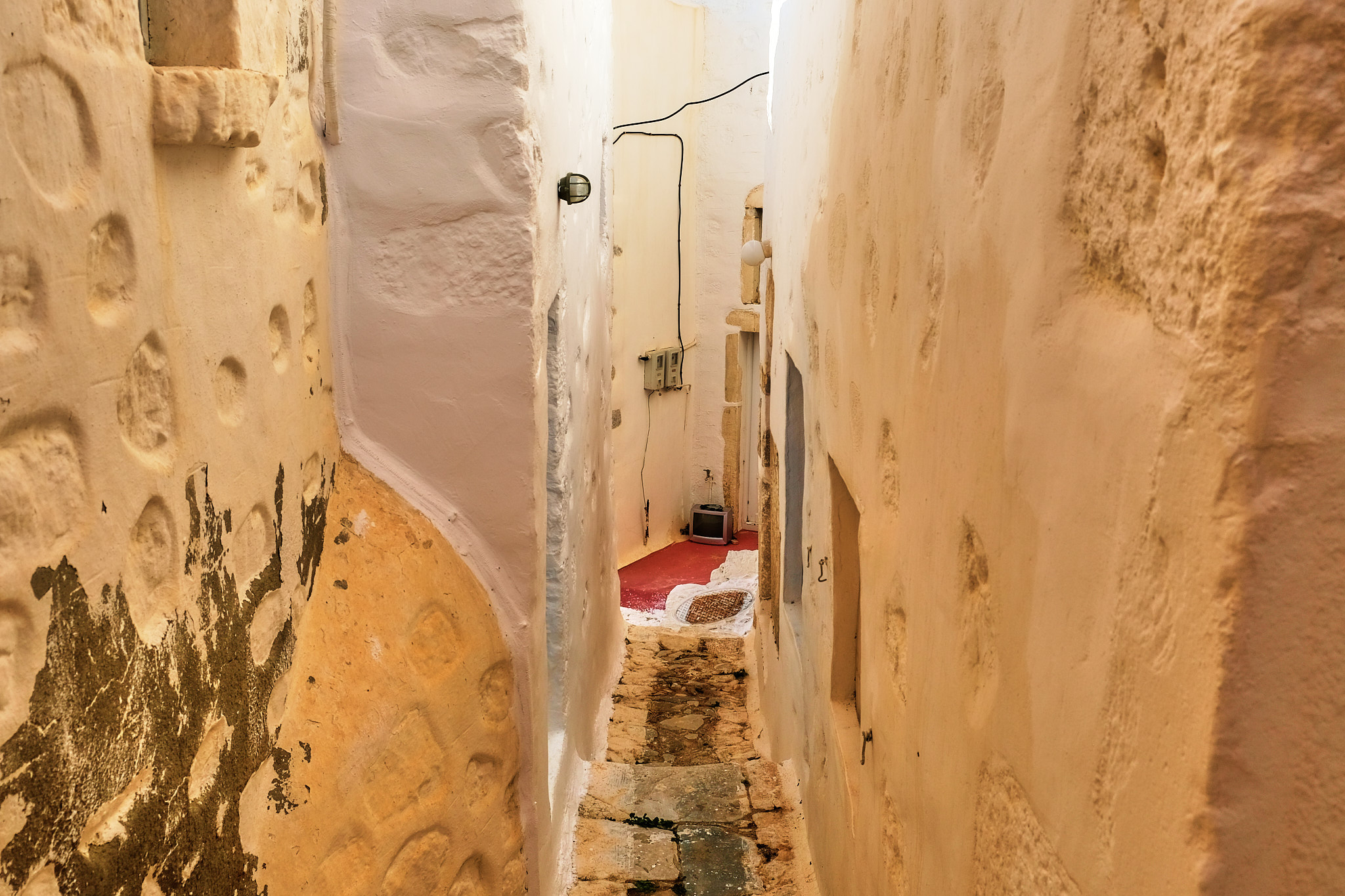
Narrow path between village houses on the island of Astypalea.

The architecture of ancient Greece was produced by the ancient Greeks (Hellenes), whose culture flourished on the Greek mainland, the Aegean Islands and their colonies, from about 900 BC until the 1st century AD, with the earliest remaining architectural works dating from around 600 BC. The formal vocabulary of ancient Greek architecture, in particular the division of architectural style into three defined orders (the Doric Order, the Ionic Order, and the Corinthian Order), was to have a profound effect on Western architecture.

Byzantine architecture was dominant in the Greek-speaking world and significantly influenced Medieval architecture throughout Europe and the Near East, becoming the primary progenitor of the Renaissance and Ottoman architectural traditions that followed the Byzantine Empire's collapse.

After Greek Independence, modern Greek architects combined traditional Greek and Byzantine elements and motives with Western European movements and styles. Patras was the first city of the modern Greek state to develop a city plan applying the orthogonal rule by Stamatis Voulgaris, a Greek engineer of the French army, in 1829.

Two special genres can be considered the Cycladic architecture, featuring white-coloured houses, in the Cyclades and the Epirotic architecture in the region of Epirus. Important is also the influence of the Venetian style in the Ionian Islands and the "Mediterranean style" of Florestano Di Fausto (during the fascist regime) in the Dodecanese islands.

After the establishment of the Greek Kingdom, the architecture of Athens and other cities was mostly influenced by the Neoclassical architecture. For Athens, the first King of Greece, Otto of Greece, commissioned the architects Stamatios Kleanthis and Eduard Schaubert to design a modern city plan fit for a capital. After the Great Thessaloniki Fire of 1917, the government ordered for a new city plan under the supervision of Ernest Hébrard. Other modern Greek architects include Anastasios Metaxas, Lysandros Kaftanzoglou, Panagis Kalkos, Ernst Ziller, Xenophon Paionidis, Dimitris Pikionis, and Georges Candilis.

There is an emerging need to secure the long-term preservation of the archaeological sites and monuments against the growing threats of climate change.

=== Theatre ===
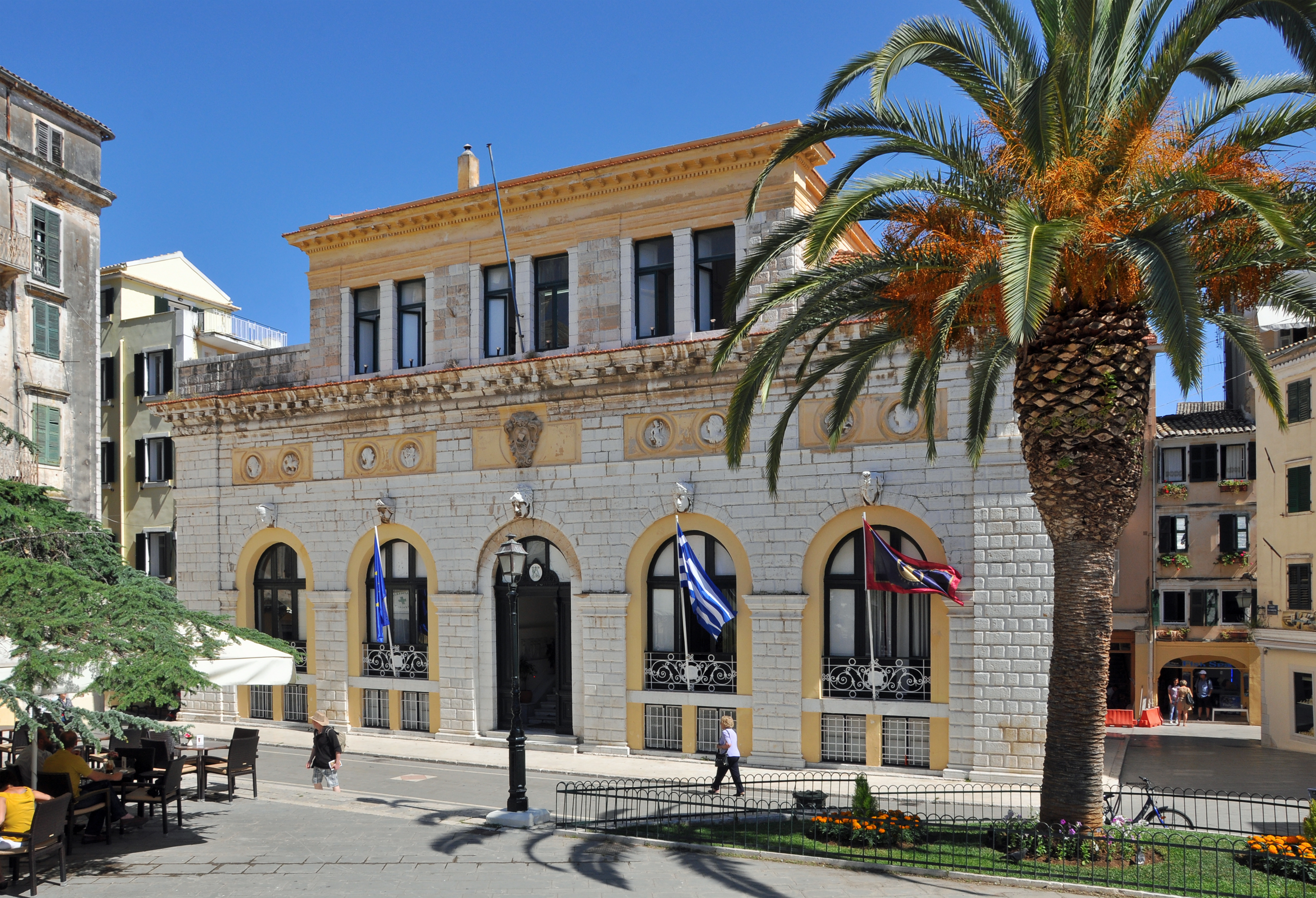
Nobile Teatro di San Giacomo di Corfù, the first theatre and opera house of modern Greece

Theatre in its Western form was born in Greece. Tragedy (late 6th century BC), comedy (486 BC), and the satyr play were the three dramatic genres that emerged in the city-state of Classical Athens and were institutionalised as part of a festival called the Dionysia, which honoured the god Dionysus. Of the hundreds of tragedies written and performed during the classical age, only a limited number of plays by three authors have survived: Aeschylus, Sophocles, and Euripides. The surviving plays by Aristophanes are a treasure trove of comic presentation.

During the Byzantine period, theatrical art declined; the only form that survived was folk theatre (Mimos and Pantomimos), despite the hostility of the state. During the Ottoman period, the main theatrical folk art was the Karagiozis. The Renaissance, which led to the modern Greek theatre, took place in the Venetian Crete. Significant dramatists of the era include Vitsentzos Kornaros and Georgios Chortatzis.

Modern Greek theatre was born after independence, in the early 19th century, and initially was influenced by Heptanesean theatre and melodrama, such as the Italian opera. The Nobile Teatro di San Giacomo di Corfù was the first theatre and opera house of modern Greece and the place where the first Greek opera, Spyridon Xyndas' The Parliamentary Candidate was performed. During the late 19th and early 20th century, the Athenian theatre scene was dominated by revues, musical comedies, operettas and nocturnes and notable playwrights included Spyridon Samaras, Dionysios Lavrangas, Theophrastos Sakellaridis.

The National Theatre of Greece was opened in 1900 as Royal Theatre. Notable playwrights of the modern Greek theatre include Gregorios Xenopoulos, Nikos Kazantzakis, Pantelis Horn, Alekos Sakellarios, and Iakovos Kambanellis, while notable actors include Cybele Andrianou, Marika Kotopouli, Aimilios Veakis, Orestis Makris, Katina Paxinou, Manos Katrakis, and Dimitris Horn. Significant directors include Dimitris Rontiris, Alexis Minotis, and Karolos Koun.

=== Literature ===
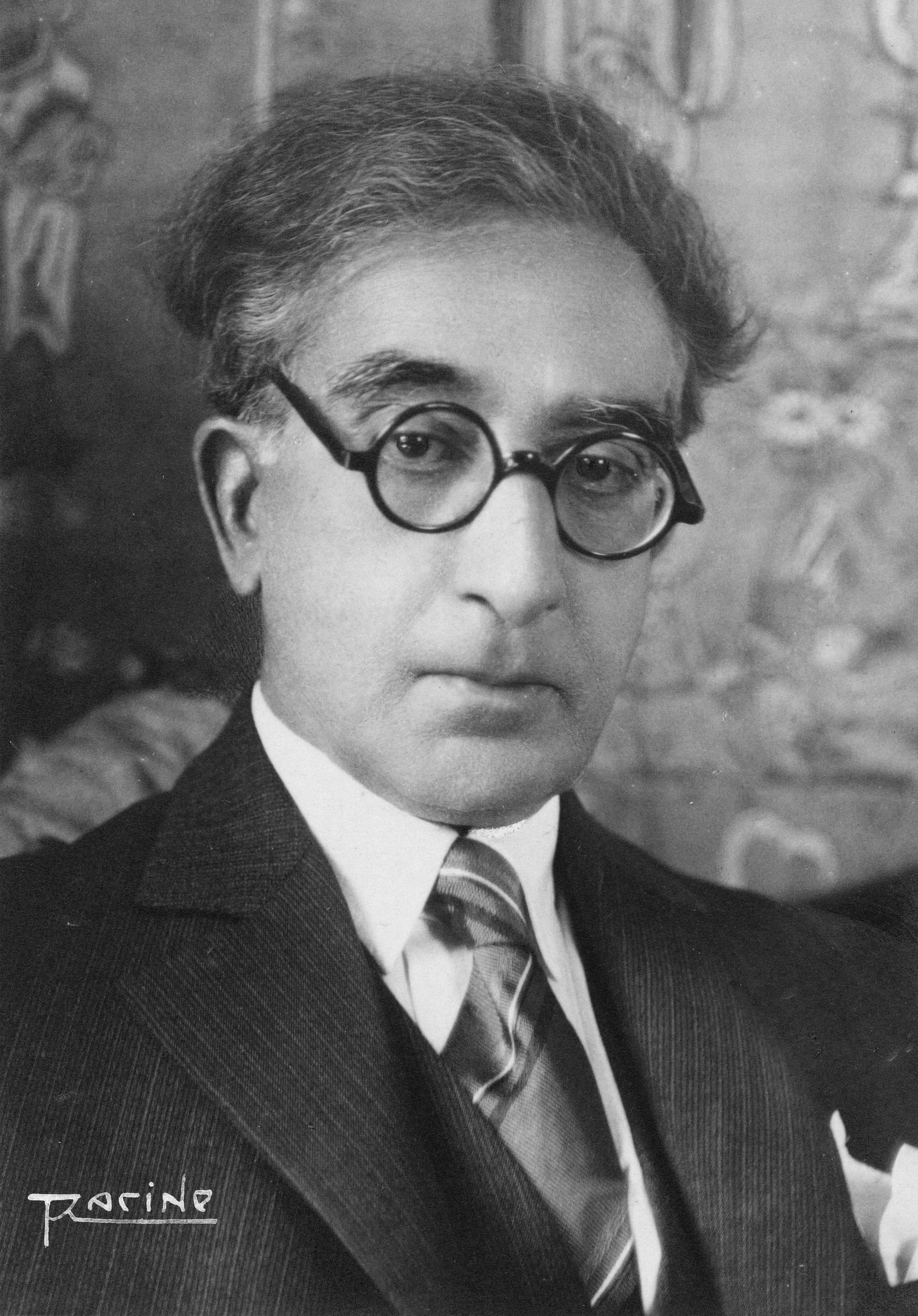
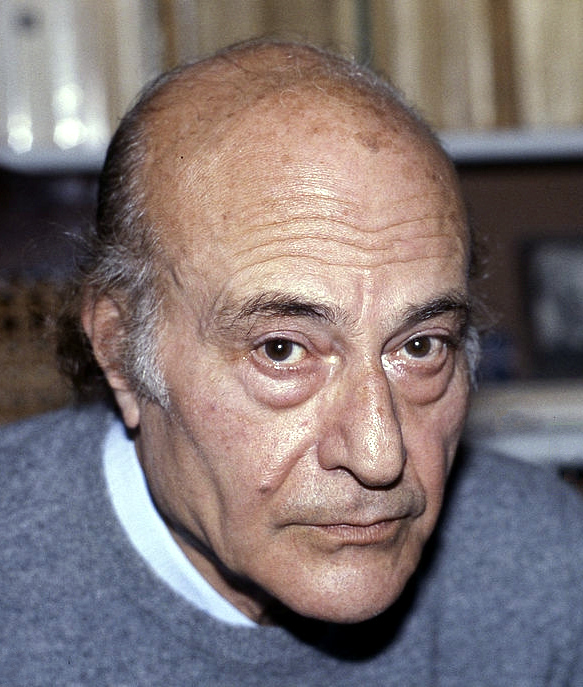
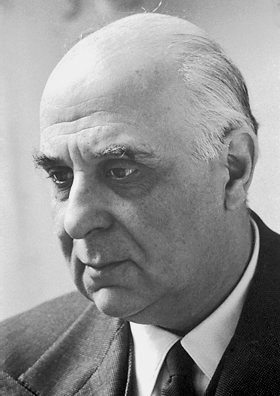
Constantine P. Cavafy's work was inspired mainly by the Hellenistic past, while Odysseas Elytis (centre) and Giorgos Seferis (right) were representatives of the Generation of the '30s and Nobel laureates in Literature

Greek literature can be divided into three main categories: Ancient, Byzantine, and modern Greek. Athens is considered the birthplace of Western literature. At the beginning of Greek literature stand the monumental works of Homer: the Iliad and the Odyssey, composed around 800 BC or after. In the classical period, many of the genres of Western literature became more prominent. Lyrical poetry, odes, pastorals, elegies, epigrams; dramatic presentations of comedy and tragedy; historiography, rhetorical treatises, philosophical dialectics, and philosophical treatises all arose in this period. The two major lyrical poets were Sappho and Pindar. Herodotus and Thucydides are two of the most influential historians in this period.

Byzantine literature written in Attic, Medieval and early Modern Greek, is the expression of the intellectual life of the Byzantine Greeks during the Christian Middle Ages. Although popular Byzantine literature and early Modern Greek literature both began in the 11th century, the two are indistinguishable.

Modern Greek literature refers to literature written in the common Modern Greek language, emerging in the late Byzantine period of the 11th century. The Cretan Renaissance poem Erotokritos is considered the masterpiece of this period. It is a verse romance written around 1600 by Vitsentzos Kornaros (1553–1613). Later, during the period of Greek enlightenment (Diafotismos), writers such as Adamantios Korais and Rigas Feraios prepared with their works the Greek Revolution.

Leading figures of modern Greek literature include Dionysios Solomos, Andreas Kalvos, Angelos Sikelianos, Emmanuel Rhoides, Demetrius Vikelas, Kostis Palamas, Penelope Delta, Yannis Ritsos, Alexandros Papadiamantis, Nikos Kazantzakis, Andreas Embirikos, Kostas Karyotakis, Gregorios Xenopoulos, Constantine Cavafy, Nikos Kavvadias, Kostas Varnalis, and Kiki Dimoula. Two Greek authors have been awarded the Nobel Prize in Literature: George Seferis in 1963, and Odysseas Elytis in 1979.

=== Philosophy ===
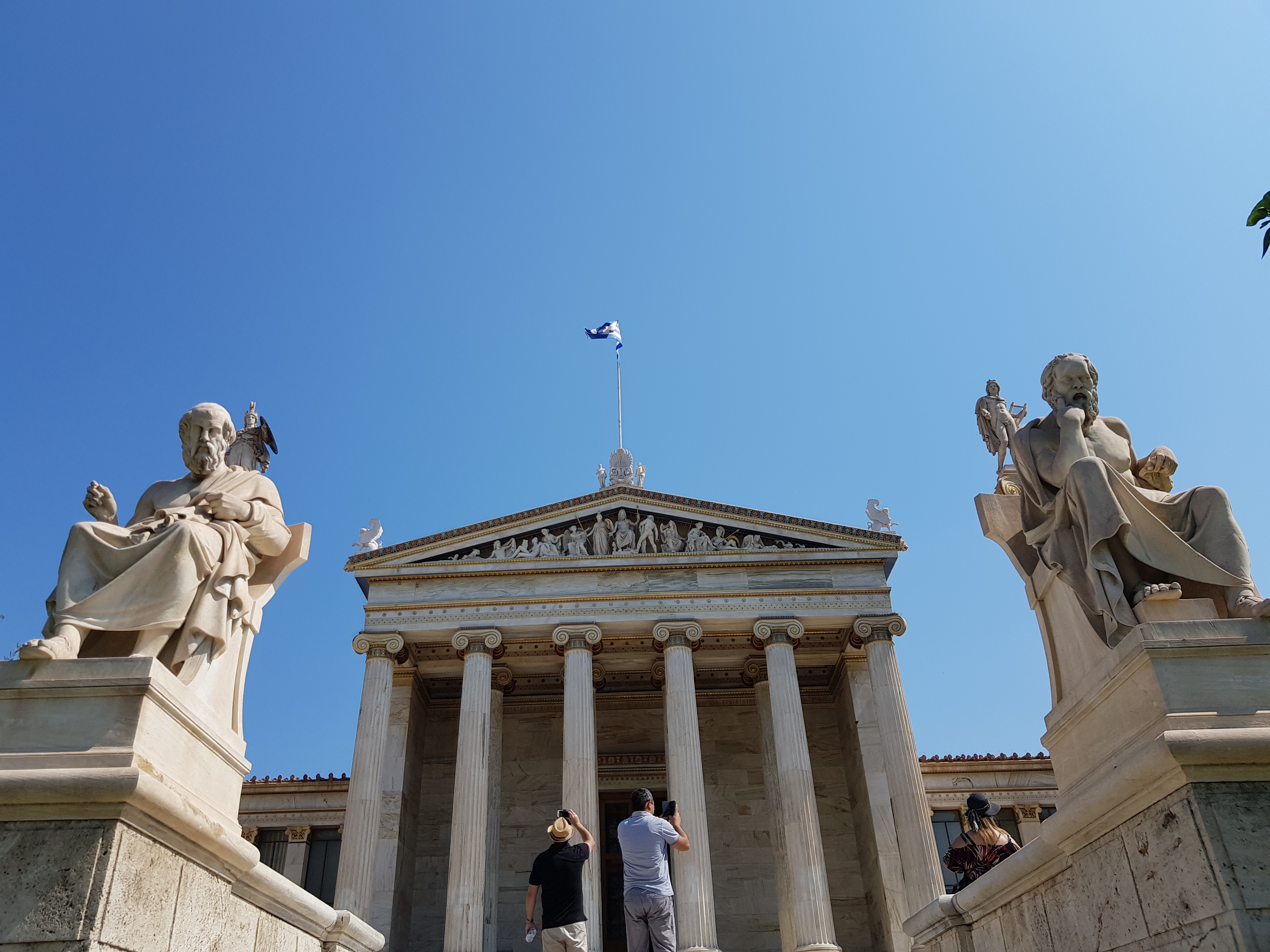
Statues of Plato (left) and Socrates (right) in front of the Academy of Athens, Greece's national academy and highest research establishment.

Ancient Greek philosophy involved a disposition to value reasoning and thinking critically of traditional culture, thus inaugurating the Western intellectual tradition. While thinkers before him provided proto-scientific explanations of the natural world, Socrates in 5th-century Athens systematically enquired ethics; the next century, his disciple, Plato, wrote presently still pertinent dialogues about ethics, politics, metaphysics, and epistemology. There were also topics of treatises composed by Plato's prolific student, Aristotle, whose thought, especially in physics, infused the West for centuries. Other philosophical schools emerged during the Hellenistic period, Cynicism, Stoicism, Epicureanism and Skepticism, while Neoplatonism dominated subsequent thought.

Byzantine philosophy was characterised by a Christian world-view, but one which could draw ideas directly from the Greek texts of Plato, Aristotle, and the Neoplatonists. On the eve of the Fall of Constantinople, Gemistus Pletho tried to restore the use of the term "Hellene" and advocated the return to the Olympian gods of the ancient world. Byzantine Greek scholars, who were largely responsible for preserving Classical Greek knowledge, fled to the West after the fall of Byzantium, taking with them literature and significantly contributing to the Renaissance.

In the modern period, Diafotismos (Greek: Διαφωτισμός, "enlightenment", "illumination") was the Greek expression of the Age of Enlightenment and its philosophical and political ideas. Notable representatives were Adamantios Korais, Rigas Feraios and Theophilos Kairis. Other modern era Greek philosophers or political scientists include Helle Lambridis, Cornelius Castoriadis, Nicos Poulantzas and Christos Yannaras.

=== Music and dances ===
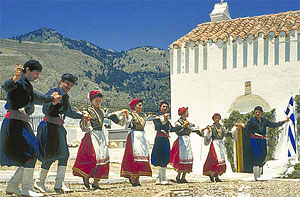
Cretan dancers of traditional folk music

Greek vocal music dates back to ancient times, when mixed-gender choruses performed for entertainment, celebration, and spiritual reasons. Instruments included the double-reed aulos and the plucked string instrument, the lyre, especially the special kind called a kithara. While the new technique of polyphony was developing in the West, the Eastern Orthodox Church resisted change. Therefore, Byzantine music remained monophonic and without any form of instrumental accompaniment. As a result, and despite certain attempts by certain Greek chanters, Byzantine music was deprived of elements which, in the West, encouraged an unimpeded development of art. Byzantium presented the monophonic Byzantine chant, a melodic music, with rhythmical variety and expressive power.

Along with Byzantine chant and music, the Greeks cultivated the Greek folk song (Demotiko), which is divided into two cycles, the akritic and klephtic. The akritic was created between the 9th and 10th centuries and depicted the life and struggles of the akrites (frontier guards) of the Byzantine Empire, the most well-known of whom was Digenes Akritas. The klephtic cycle came into being between the late Byzantine period and the start of the Greek War of Independence. The most famous klephtic and modern Greek folk song is The Battle of Mount Olympus and Mount Kisavos, a ballad based on a musico-poetic motif dating back to classical Greece. The klephtic cycle, together with historical songs, paraloghes (narrative song or ballad), love songs, mantinades, wedding songs, songs of exile, and dirges express the life of the Greeks.

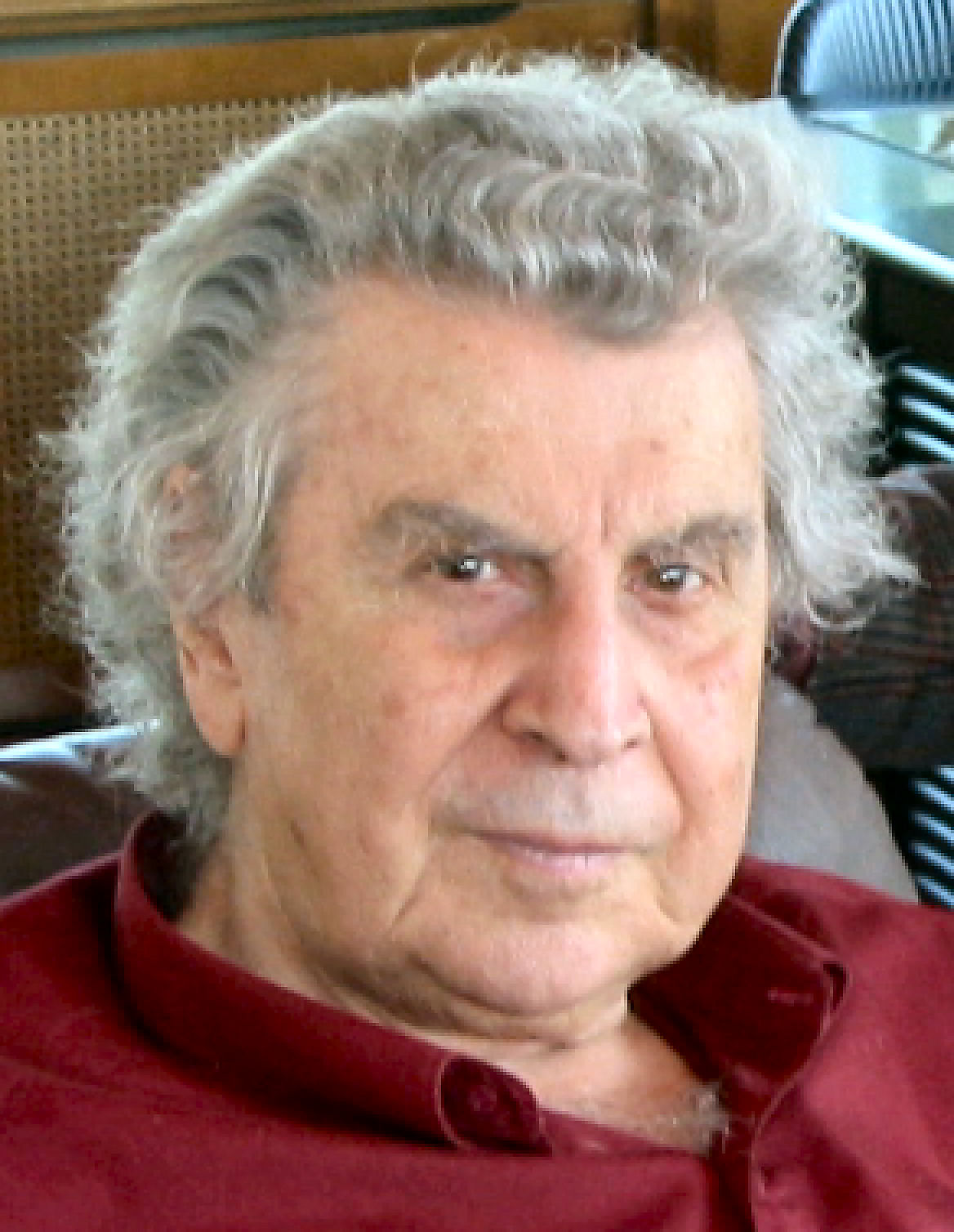
Mikis Theodorakis was one of the most popular and significant Greek composers.

The Heptanesean kantádhes (καντάδες 'serenades'; sing.: καντάδα) became the forerunners of the Greek modern urban popular song, influencing its development. For the first part of the next century, Greek composers continued to borrow elements from the Heptanesean style. The most successful songs during 1870–1930 were the so-called Athenian serenades, and the songs performed on stage ('theatrical revue songs') in revues, operettas, and nocturnes that dominated Athens' theatre scene.

Rebetiko, initially a music associated with the lower classes, later gained greater acceptance as the rough edges of its overt subcultural character were softened, sometimes to the point of unrecognisability. It was the base of the later laïkó (song of the people). The leading performers of the genre include Vassilis Tsitsanis, Grigoris Bithikotsis, Stelios Kazantzidis, George Dalaras, Haris Alexiou and Glykeria.

It was through the Ionian islands (which were under western rule) that major advances of the western European classical music were introduced to mainland Greeks. The region is notable for the birth of the first school of modern Greek classical music (Heptanesean or Ionian School), established in 1815. Prominent representatives of this genre include Nikolaos Mantzaros, Spyridon Xyndas, Spyridon Samaras and Pavlos Carrer. Manolis Kalomiris is considered the founder of the Greek National School of Music.

In the 20th century, Greek composers had a significant impact on the development of avant garde and modern classical music, with figures such as Iannis Xenakis, Nikos Skalkottas, and Dimitri Mitropoulos achieving international prominence. Composers and musicians such as Mikis Theodorakis, Manos Hatzidakis, Eleni Karaindrou, Vangelis and Demis Roussos garnered an international following, which include famous film scores such as Zorba the Greek, Serpico, Never on Sunday, America America, Eternity and a Day, Chariots of Fire, and Blade Runner. Greek American composers known for their film scores include Yanni and Basil Poledouris. Greek opera singers and classical musicians of the 20th and 21st century include Maria Callas, Nana Mouskouri, Mario Frangoulis, Leonidas Kavakos, and Dimitris Sgouros.

During the Greek junta of 1967–74, the music of Mikis Theodorakis was banned, the composer jailed, internally exiled, and put in a concentration camp, before finally being allowed to leave Greece due to international reaction. Released during the junta years, Make Love, Stop the Gunfire, by pop group Poll is considered the first anti-war protest song in Greek rock.

Greece participated in the Eurovision Song Contest 35 times after its debut at the 1974 Contest. In 2005, Greece won with "My Number One", performed by Greek-Swedish singer Elena Paparizou, which became a smash hit in different countries and especially in Greece, and the 51st Eurovision Song Contest of 2006 was held in Athens.

=== Cinema ===
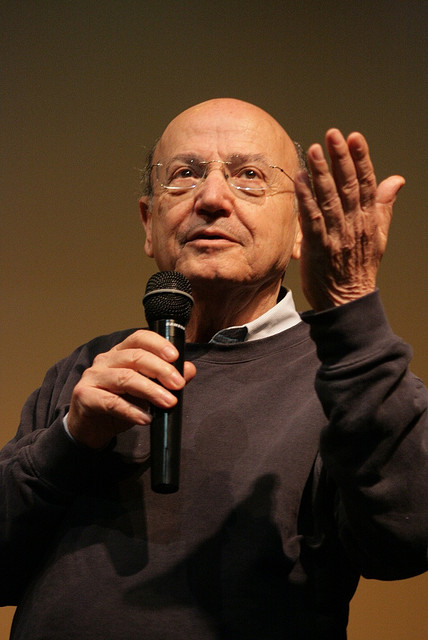
Theodoros Angelopoulos, winner of the Palme d'Or in 1998, notable director in the history of the European cinema

Cinema first appeared in Greece in 1896, but the first cine-theatre was opened in 1907 in Athens. In 1914, the Asty Films Company was founded and the production of long films began. Golfo, a well known traditional love story, is considered the first Greek feature film, although there were minor productions such as newscasts before. In 1931, Orestis Laskos directed Daphnis and Chloe, containing one of the first nude scene in European cinema; it was the first Greek movie played abroad. In 1944, Katina Paxinou was honoured with the Best Supporting Actress Academy Award for For Whom the Bell Tolls.

The 1950s and early 1960s are considered to be a "golden age" of Greek cinema. Directors and actors of this era were recognised as important figures in Greece and some gained international acclaim: George Tzavellas, Irene Papas, Melina Mercouri, Michael Cacoyannis, Alekos Sakellarios, Nikos Tsiforos, Iakovos Kambanelis, Katina Paxinou, Nikos Koundouros, Ellie Lambeti and others. More than sixty films per year were made, with most having film noir elements. Notable films include The Drunkard (1950, directed by George Tzavellas), The Counterfeit Coin (1955, by Giorgos Tzavellas), Πικρό Ψωμί (1951, by Grigoris Grigoriou), O Drakos (1956, by Nikos Koundouros), Stella (1955, directed by Cacoyannis and written by Kampanellis), Woe to the Young (1961, by Alekos Sakellarios), Glory Sky (1962, by Takis Kanellopoulos) and The Red Lanterns (1963, by Vasilis Georgiadis)

Cacoyannis directed Zorba the Greek with Anthony Quinn which received Best Director, Best Adapted Screenplay, and Best Film nominations. Finos Film contributed in this period with movies such as Λατέρνα, Φτώχεια και Φιλότιμο, Madalena, I theia ap' to Chicago, Το ξύλο βγήκε από τον Παράδεισο and many more.

During the 1970s and 1980s, Theo Angelopoulos directed notable movies. His film Eternity and a Day won the Palme d'Or and the Prize of the Ecumenical Jury at the 1998 Cannes Film Festival.

There are internationally renowned filmmakers in the Greek diaspora, such as the Greek-French Costa-Gavras and the Greek-Americans Elia Kazan, John Cassavetes, and Alexander Payne. Yorgos Lanthimos has received four Academy Award nominations for his work, including Best Foreign Language Film for Dogtooth (2009), Best Original Screenplay for The Lobster (2015), and Best Picture and Best Director for The Favourite (2018).

=== Cuisine ===
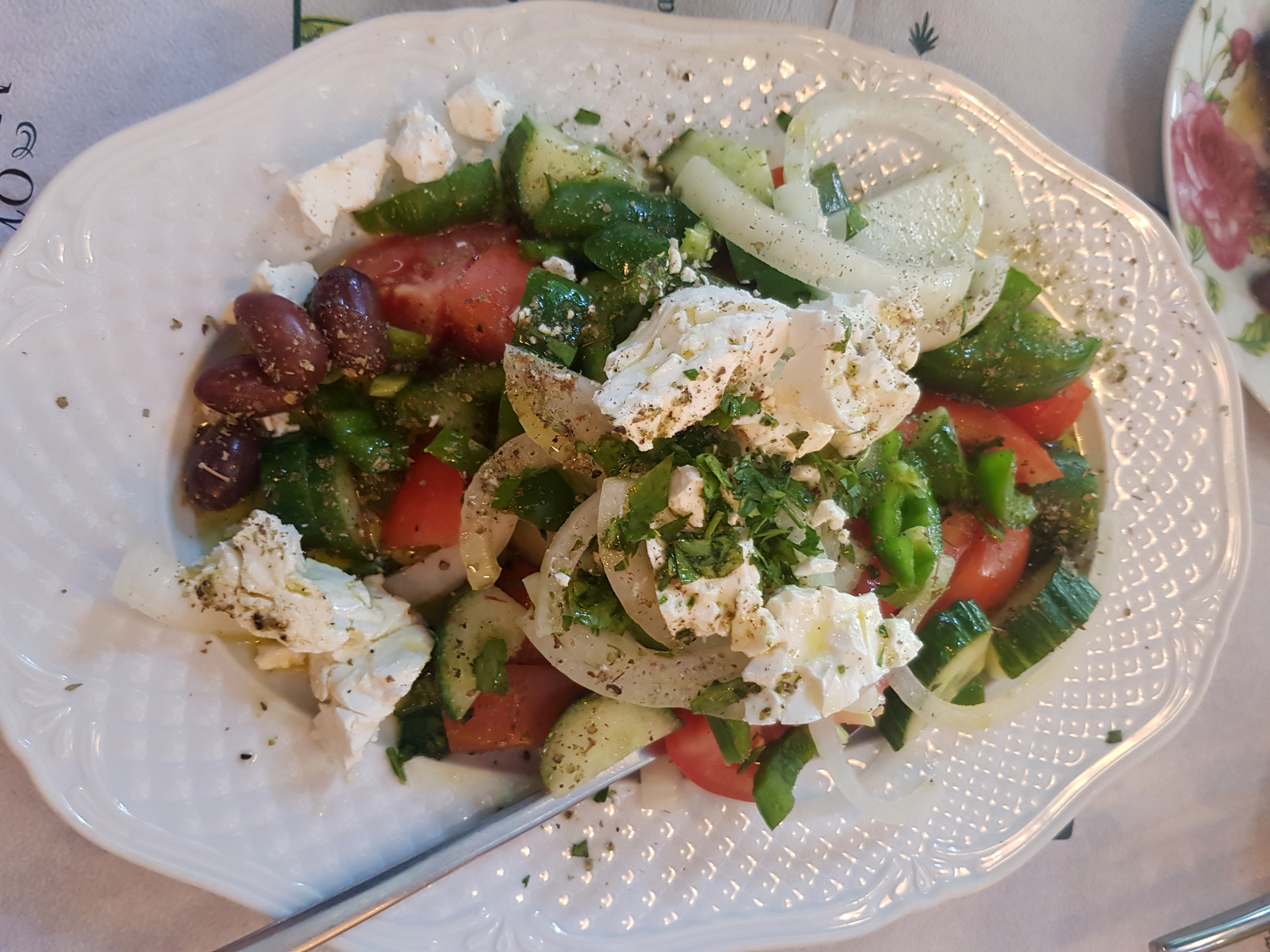
A Greek salad, with feta and olives

Greek cuisine is characteristic of the Mediterranean diet, which is epitomised by dishes of Crete. Greek cuisine incorporates fresh ingredients into local dishes such as moussaka, pastitsio, classic Greek salad, fasolada, spanakopita and souvlaki. Some dishes can be traced back to ancient Greece like skordalia (a thick purée of walnuts, almonds, crushed garlic and olive oil), lentil soup, retsina (white or rosé wine sealed with pine resin) and pasteli (candy bar with sesame seeds baked with honey). People often enjoy eating from small dishes such as meze with dips such as tzatziki, grilled octopus and small fish, feta cheese, dolmades (rice, currants and pine kernels wrapped in vine leaves), various pulses, olives and cheese. Olive oil is a widespread addition.

Sweet desserts include melomakarona, diples and galaktoboureko, and drinks such as ouzo, metaxa and wines including retsina. Greek cuisine differs from different parts of the mainland and island to island. It uses some flavourings more often than other Mediterranean cuisines: oregano, mint, garlic, onion, dill and bay laurel leaves. Other common herbs and spices include basil, thyme and fennel seed. Many recipes, especially in the northern parts of the country, use "sweet" spices in combination with meat, for example cinnamon and cloves in stews. Koutoukia are an underground restaurant common in Greece.

=== Sports ===
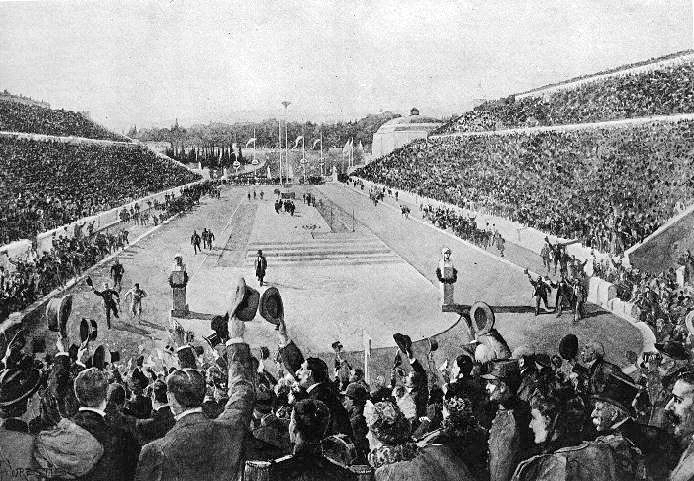
Spyridon Louis entering the Panathenaic Stadium at the end of the marathon; 1896 Summer Olympics

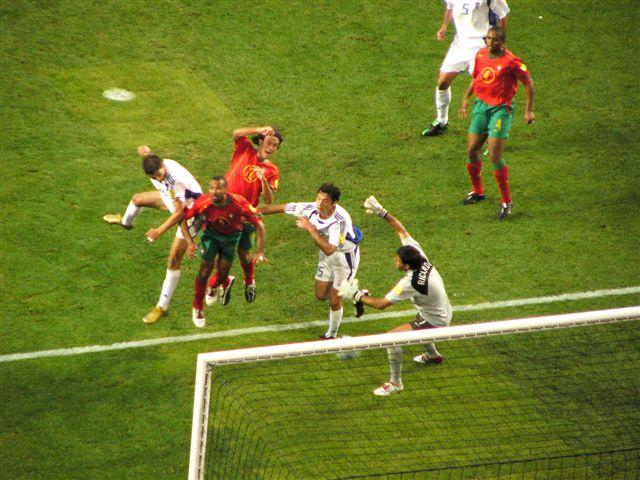
Angelos Charisteas scoring Greece's winning goal in the UEFA Euro 2004 Final

Greece is the birthplace of the ancient Olympic Games, first recorded in 776 BC in Olympia, and hosted the modern Olympic Games twice, the inaugural 1896 Summer Olympics and the 2004 Summer Olympics. During the parade of nations, Greece is always called first, as the founding nation of the ancient precursor of the modern Olympics. The nation has competed at every Summer Olympic Games, one of only four countries to have done so. Having won a total of 129 medals (36 gold, 46 silver and 47 bronze), Greece is ranked 35th by gold medals in the all-time Summer Olympic medal count. Their best ever performance was in the 1896 Summer Olympics, when Greece finished second in the medal table with 10 gold medals.

The Greece national football team, ranked 40th in the world as of 2026 (and having reached a high of 8th in 2008 and 2011), were crowned European Champions in Euro 2004 in one of the biggest upsets in the history of the sport. The Greek Super League is the highest professional football league, comprising fourteen teams. The most successful are Olympiacos, Panathinaikos, and AEK Athens.

The Greek national basketball team has a decades-long tradition of excellence and is considered among the world's top basketball powers. As of 2026, it ranked 12th in the world and 7th in Europe. They have won the European Championship twice in 1987 and 2005, and have reached the final four in two of the last four FIBA World Championships, taking the second place in the world in 2006 FIBA World Championship. The domestic top basketball league, A1 Ethniki, has fourteen teams. The most successful Greek teams are Panathinaikos, Olympiacos, Aris Thessaloniki, AEK Athens and PAOK. Greek basketball teams are the most successful in European basketball the last 25 years. After the 2005 European Championship triumph of the Greek national basketball team, Greece became the reigning European Champion in both football and basketball.

The Greece women's national water polo team have emerged as one of the leading powers in the world, becoming World Champions in 2011. They won gold at the 2005 World League and silver at the 2010 and 2012 European Championships. The Greece men's national water polo team became the third best water polo team in the world in 2005. The domestic top water polo leagues, Greek Men's Water Polo League and Greek Women's Water Polo League are considered amongst the top national leagues in European water polo, as its clubs have made significant success in European competitions.

The Greek men's national volleyball team has won two bronze medals, one in the European Volleyball Championship and another one in the Men's European Volleyball League. The Greek league, the A1 Ethniki, is considered one of the top volleyball leagues in Europe and Greek clubs have had significant success in European competitions. Olympiacos is the most successful volleyball club in the country. In handball, AC Diomidis Argous is the only Greek club to have won a European Cup.

=== Public holidays and festivals ===
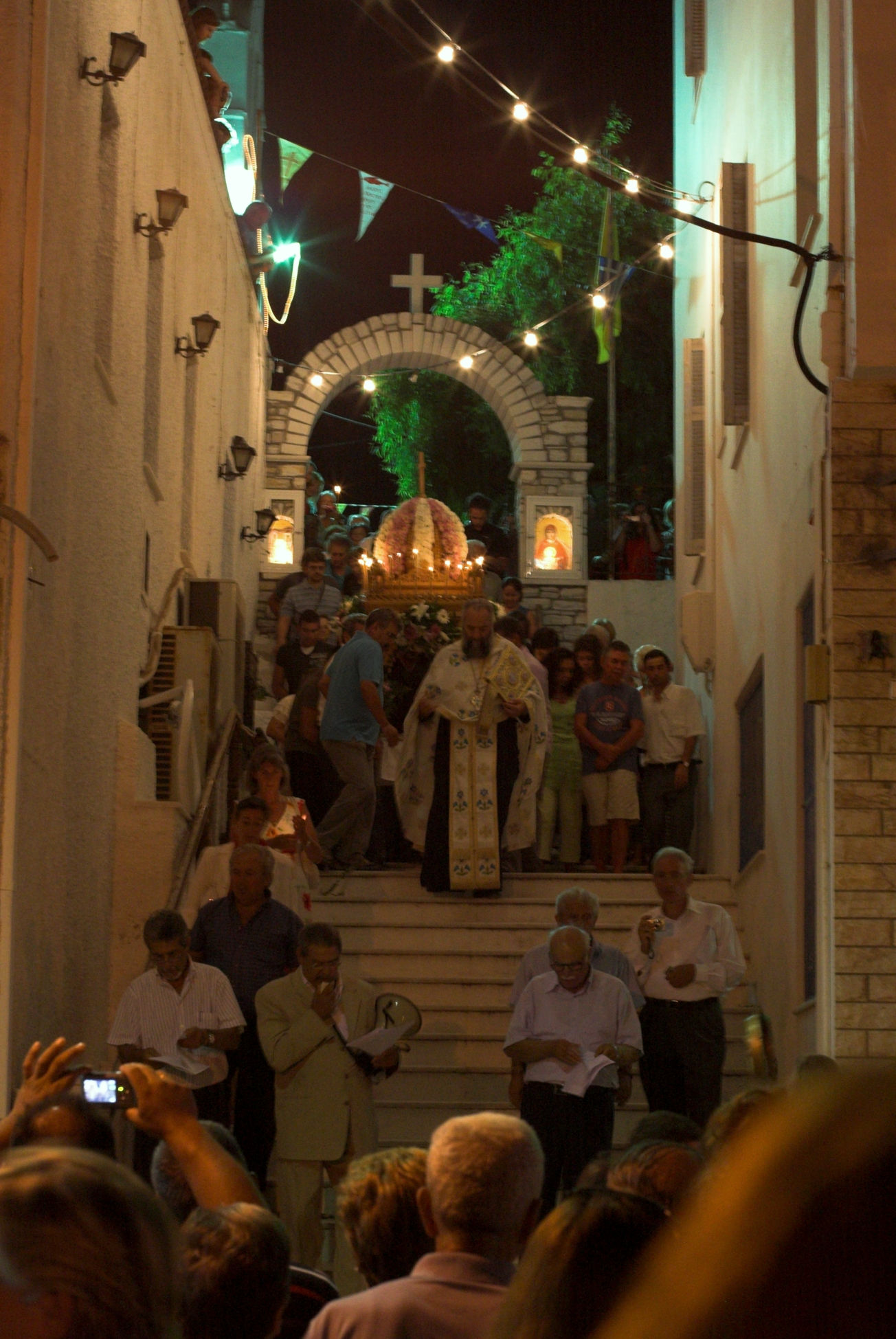
Procession in honour of the Assumption of Virgin Mary (15 August), a major holiday

According to Greek law, every Sunday of the year is a public holiday. Since the late '70s, Saturday has also been a non-school and non-working day. In addition, there are four mandatory official public holidays: 25 March (Greek Independence Day), Easter Monday, 15 August (Assumption or Dormition of the Holy Virgin), and 25 December (Christmas). 1 May (Labour Day) and 28 October (Ohi Day) are regulated by law as being optional but it is customary for employees to be given the day off. There are, however, more public holidays celebrated in Greece than announced by the Ministry of Labour each year as either obligatory or optional, giving a total of eleven national holidays each year. In addition to the national holidays, there are public holidays that are celebrated only by a specific professional group or a local community. For example, many municipalities have a "Patron Saint" parallel to "Name Days", or a "Liberation Day". Notable festivals, beyond the religious feasts, include Patras Carnival, Athens Festival, and local wine festivals. The city of Thessaloniki is also home of a number of festivals and events. The Thessaloniki International Film Festival is one of the most important film festivals in Southern Europe.

== See also ==
- Outline of Greece
  - Outline of ancient Greece
