= Thessaloniki Inner Ring Road =

Road in Greece

Thessaloniki Inner Ring Road
- Εσωτερική Περιφερειακή Οδός Θεσσαλονίκης
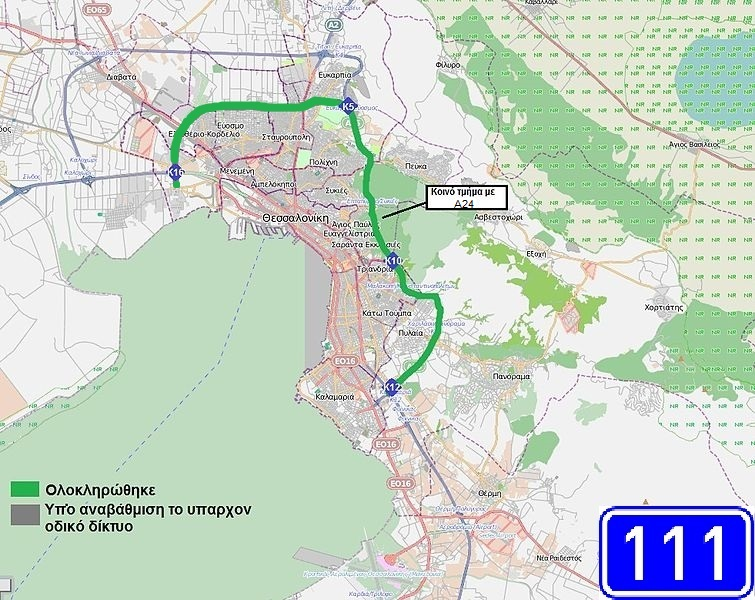

Route information
- Existed: 1970s–present

Major junctions
- West end: Lahanagora
- East end: Kalamaria

Location
- Country: Greece
- Regions: Central Macedonia
- Primary destinations: Thessaloniki

Highway system
- Highways in Greece; Motorways; National roads
← EO	→ EO

The Thessaloniki Inner Ring Road (Greek: Εσωτερική Περιφερειακή οδός Θεσσαλονίκης) is a dual carriageway ring road encircling most of the Thessaloniki Urban Area in Central Macedonia, Greece. Planned in 1975 and put into service in the 1990s, it consists of the Western Ring section (Δυτική Περιφερειακή), and of the main Inner Ring section (Greek: Εσωτερική Περιφερειακή). With three lanes per direction it carries over 120.000 cars per day, making it one of the country's most busy highway sections.

== Course ==
The Western Ring section starts at a coastal spur highway, the Thessaloniki New Western Entrance (signposted as part of the A2 motorway). Passing by the municipalities Ampelokipoi-Menemeni, Kordelio-Evosmos and Pavlos Melas it joins the A24 motorway (Promachonas–Nea Moudania) near Efkarpia. The Western Ring section has been recently upgraded to full Motorway standard in its biggest part with five new intersections have been built.

The A24 motorway forms the 21 km main section of the Inner Ring. Following the outline of the city's eastern periphery, it separates the city from the forests of Kedrinos Lofos (Cedar Hill) known as "Seich Sou" (Sheikh's water). When the road was planned in the 1970s, this fact drew massive protests by what would become the country's pioneer environmentalist movement, the Ecological Movement of Thessaloniki.

In southern Thessaloniki, A123 motorway forms a short extension of the Thessaloniki Inner Ring connecting it with National Road 16 and the Thessaloniki Airport.

== Exit list ==
Municipality	km	mi	Exit	Name	Destinations	Notes
Delta, Thessaloniki			—	—	Port, Kalochori	At-grade junction.
Ampelokipoi-Menemeni			—	—	A1 / E75 – Athens, Thessaloniki, Veria	
Ampelokipoi-Menemeni			—	—	Central Market of Thessaloniki, Pontou	
Kordelio-Evosmos			—	—	EO2 – Edessa, Evzonoi (via Monastiriou)	At-grade junction.
Kordelio-Evosmos			—	—	23 July 1974 Street	At-grade junction.
Kordelio-Evosmos			—	—	Neo Kordelio	
Kordelio-Evosmos			—	Evosmos	Evosmos	
Kordelio-Evosmos			—	—	Evosmos, Nea Politeia	Clockwise entry only.
Kordelio-Evosmos			—	Ilioupoli	Ilioupoli, Nea Politeia	
Pavlos Melas			—	Ilioupoli	Ilioupoli, Nea Politeia	
Pavlos Melas			—	—	EO2 / E79 – Oraiokastro, Centre, Stavroupoli	
Pavlos Melas			—	—	Efkarpia, Polichni, Papageorgiou Hospital	
Pavlos Melas			—	—	A24 – Kavala, Katerini, Papageorgiou Hospital, 424 Military Hospital	Clockwise exit only.
Pavlos Melas			—	—	Efkarpia	Clockwise entry and exit only.
Pavlos Melas			5	—	A24 – Edessa, Kilkis, Serres, Kavala, Katerini	Clockwise entry and anticlockwise exit only; turn off to stay on anticlockwise. Northern end of concurrency with the A24 expressway.
Pavlos Melas			—	—	Papageorgiou Hospital, 424 Military Hospital	Clockwise entry and anticlockwise exit only.
Pavlos Melas			6	—	Neapoli, Asvestochori, Pefka, Papanikolaou Hospital	No anticlockwise exit to Neapoli.
Neapoli-Sykies			6	—	Neapoli, Asvestochori, Pefka, Papanikolaou Hospital	No anticlockwise exit to Neapoli.
Neapoli-Sykies			7	—	Sykies, Heptapyrgion, Filipio	
Neapoli-Sykies			—	—	Agios Pavlos	No anticlockwise entry from Ochi Road.
Thessaloniki			—	—	Agios Pavlos	No anticlockwise entry from Ochi Road.
Thessaloniki			8	—	Thessaloniki (Centre), Triandria	Exits 8 and 9 combined clockwise.
Pylaia-Chortiatis			8	—	Thessaloniki (Centre), Triandria	Exits 8 and 9 combined clockwise.
Pylaia-Chortiatis			9	—	Toumba	Exits 8 and 9 combined clockwise.
Pylaia-Chortiatis			10	—	Toumba, Konstantinopolitika, Malakopi	
Pylaia-Chortiatis			11	—	Pylaia, Charilaou, Panorama, Chortiatis	
Pylaia-Chortiatis			—	—	Prasakaki Street	No crossover.
Pylaia-Chortiatis			12	—	A24 / EO – Chalkidiki, Airport, Thessaloniki (Centre)	No anticlockwise exit to Nea Diagonios. Southern end of concurrency with the A24 expressway.
Pylaia-Chortiatis			—	—	Agios Pavlos Hospital	
Pylaia-Chortiatis			—	—	EO16 – Airport, Kalamaria, Thessaloniki (Centre)	At-grade junction.
1.000 mi = 1.609 km; 1.000 km = 0.621 mi: Incomplete access
