= List of cities and towns in Greece =

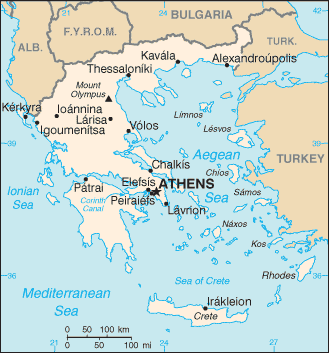
CIA map of Greece

Two thirds of the Greek people live in urban areas. Greece's largest metropolitan centers and most influential urban areas are those of Athens and Thessaloniki, with metropolitan populations of approximately 4,000,000 and 990,000 inhabitants, respectively. The third-largest city is Patras, with a metropolitan area of approximately 250,000 inhabitants. The table below lists the largest cities in Greece, by population size, using the official census results of 1991, 2001, 2011 and 2021. Athens is the most populous city in Greece, with a population of more than 600,000 people.

== Census-designated places ==
The lowest level of census-designated places in Greece are called oikismoi (settlements) and are the smallest continuous built-up areas with a toponym designated for the census. Although some urban CDPs form individual cities and towns (labeled in bold) the majority of them do not. They are either what make up the central districts, or suburbs (italicized), contained within the wider urban and metropolitan areas of Athens and Thessaloniki.

The list below presents every settlement (CDP) that is urban, with a population of more than 10,000 de jure (permanent) residents, using data collected from the 2021 census.

Explanation of the superscript numbers
^{1} a suburb of the Athens urban area, in Athens' agglomeration/conurbation
^{2} a suburb of the Thessaloniki urban area, in Thessaloniki's agglomeration/conurbation
^{3} a suburb that belongs to Piraeus regional unit (Greater Piraeus), which is part of the Athens urban area.
^{4} a suburb of Athens' metropolitan area
^{5} a suburb of Thessaloniki's metropolitan area
^{6} a municipal unit of the Volos urban area, in Volos' agglomeration/conurbation
^{7} a municipal unit of the Heraklion urban area, in Heraklion's agglomeration/conurbation.
^{8} the core municipal community of Patras municipality which has a population of 215,922 inhabitants
^{9} a municipal unit of the Ioannina urban area, in Ioannina's agglomeration/conurbation
^{10} a municipal unit of the Chalcis urban area, in Chalkis' agglomeration/conurbation
* The settlement (CDP) of Athens is the central district of the Athens urban area.
* The settlement (CDP) of Thessaloniki is the central district of the Thessaloniki urban area.

Rank	City	Census 2021	Census 2011	Census 2001	Census 1991	Region
1	**Athens** ^{1} *	643,452	664,046	745,514	772,072	Attica
2	**Thessaloniki** ^{2} *	309,617	315,196	363,987	383,967	Central Macedonia
3	**Patras** ^{8}	170,755	167,446	160,400	152,570	Western Greece
4	Piraeus ^{1,3}	168,151	163,688	175,697	182,671	Attica
5	**Heraklion**	149,501	140,730	130,914	115,270	Crete
6	**Larissa**	146,595	144,651	124,394	112,777	Thessaly
7	Peristeri^{1}	133,630	139,981	137,918	137,288	Attica
8	Acharnes^{1}	100,857	99,346	75,329	61,052	Attica
9	Kallithea^{1}	97,616	100,641	109,609	114,233	Attica
10	Kalamaria^{2}	92,248	91,279	87,255	80,698	Central Macedonia
11	Glyfada^{1}	89,597	87,305	80,409	63,306	Attica
12	Nikaia^{1,3}	88,077	89,380	93,086	87,597	Attica
13	**Volos**	85,803	86,046	82,439	77,192	Thessaly
14	Ilion^{1}	84,004	84,793	80,859	78,326	Attica
15	Evosmos ^{2}	79,221	74,686	52,624	28,821	Central Macedonia
16	Chalandri ^{1}	77,102	74,192	71,684	66,285	Attica
17	Ilioupoli ^{1}	76,730	78,153	75,904	75,037	Attica
18	Keratsini ^{1,3}	75,721	77,077	76,102	71,982	Attica
19	Nea Smyrni ^{1}	72,853	73,076	73,986	69,749	Attica
20	Marousi ^{1}	71,830	72,333	69,470	64,092	Attica
21	Agios Dimitrios ^{1}	71,664	71,294	65,173	57,574	Attica
22	Zografou ^{1}	69,874	71,026	76,115	80,492	Attica
23	Egaleo ^{1}	65,831	69,946	74,046	78,563	Attica
24	**Ioannina**	64,896	65,574	61,629	56,699	Epirus
25	Palaio Faliro ^{1}	64,863	64,021	64,759	61,371	Attica
26	Nea Ionia ^{1}	64,611	67,134	66,017	60,635	Attica
27	**Chalcis**	64,490	59,125	53,584	51,646	Central Greece
28	Agia Paraskevi ^{1}	62,147	59,704	56,836	47,463	Attica
29	**Trikala**	62,064	61,653	48,686	45,835	Thessaly
30	Korydallos ^{1,3}	61,248	63,445	67,456	63,184	Attica
31	Petroupoli ^{1}	60,146	58,979	48,327	38,278	Attica
32	**Alexandroupoli**	59,723	57,812	48,885	37,904	Eastern Macedonia and Thrace
33	**Serres**	59,260	58,287	54,266	50,017	Central Macedonia
34	**Katerini**	59,189	55,997	50,510	43,613	Central Macedonia
35	Vyronas ^{1}	59,134	61,308	61,102	58,523	Attica
36	**Kalamata**	58,816	54,100	49,154	43,625	Peloponnese
37	**Xanthi**	58,760	56,122	45,111	37,430	Eastern Macedonia and Thrace
38	Galatsi ^{1}	57,909	59,345	58,042	57,230	Attica
39	**Rhodes**	56,440	49,541	52,318	42,400	South Aegean
40	**Chania**	54,559	53,910	53,373	50,077	Crete
41	**Komotini**	54,165	50,990	43,326	37,036	Eastern Macedonia and Thrace
42	**Kavala**	54,065	54,027	58,663	56,571	Eastern Macedonia and Thrace
43	**Agrinio**	50,690	59,329	54,523	52,081	Western Greece
44	Irakleio^{1}	50,494	49,642	45,926	42,905	Attica
45	Kifissia ^{1}	48,700	47,332	43,929	39,166	Attica
46	**Lamia**	47,529	52,006	46,406	44,084	Central Greece
47	Chaidari ^{1}	47,051	45,642	45,227	44,831	Attica
48	Stavroupoli ^{2}	45,891	46,008	41,653	37,596	Central Macedonia
49	**Drama**	44,257	44,823	42,501	37,604	Eastern Macedonia and Thrace
50	**Kozani**	43,316	41,066	35,242	31,553	Western Macedonia
51	**Veria**	43,212	43,158	42,794	37,858	Central Macedonia
52	Alimos ^{1}	43,174	41,720	38,047	32,024	Attica
53	**Karditsa**	40,272	38,554	32,031	30,067	Thessaly
54	Polichni ^{2}	38,887	39,332	36,146	27,894	Central Macedonia
55	Pylaia ^{2}	36,843	34,625	22,744	20,785	Central Macedonia
56	Ampelokipoi^{2}	35,846	37,381	40,959	40,093	Central Macedonia
57	**Rethymno**	35,763	32,468	27,868	23,420	Crete
58	Sykies ^{2}	35,545	37,753	41,726	34,059	Central Macedonia
59	Ano Liosia ^{1}	35,047	33,565	26,423	21,397	Attica
60	Gerakas ^{1}	33,856	29,939	13,921	8,512	Attica
61	**Mytilene**	33,523	27,871	27,247	23,971	North Aegean
62	Argyroupoli ^{1}	33,312	34,097	33,158	31,530	Attica
63	Vrilissia ^{1}	32,417	30,741	25,582	16,571	Attica
64	Agioi Anargyroi ^{1}	32,283	34,168	32,957	30,739	Attica
65	Nea Ionia^{6}	31,684	32,661	30,804	27,904	Thessaly
66	**Ptolemaida**	31,575	32,127	28,679	25,125	Western Macedonia
67	Voula ^{1}	31,497	28,364	25,532	17,998	Attica
68	Aspropyrgos ^{4}	31,381	30,251	27,741	15,715	Attica
69	Cholargos ^{1}	31,304	30,840	32,166	33,691	Attica
70	Koropi ^{4}	30,817	19,164	15,860	12,790	Attica
71	**Corinth**	30,816	30,176	29,787	27,412	Peloponnese
72	**Corfu**	30,737	24,838	28,185	31,359	Ionian Islands
73	**Giannitsa**	30,498	29,789	26,296	22,504	Central Macedonia
74	**Tripoli**	30,448	30,866	25,520	22,429	Peloponnese
75	Metamorfosi ^{1}	30,174	29,891	26,448	21,052	Attica
76	Kamatero ^{1}	29,179	28,361	22,234	17,410	Attica
77	Megara ^{4}	29,122	23,456	23,032	20,403	Attica
78	**Chios**	27,015	26,850	23,779	22,894	North Aegean
79	Agia Varvara ^{1}	26,759	26,550	30,562	28,706	Attica
80	Kaisariani ^{1}	26,269	26,370	26,323	26,701	Attica
81	Eleftherio-Kordelio ^{2}	26,131	27,067	21,630	16,549	Central Macedonia
82	**Pyrgos**	26,052	24,359	23,274	28,465	Western Greece
83	Neapoli^{2}	25,822	27,084	29,995	30,568	Central Macedonia
84	Perama ^{1,3}	25,628	25,389	25,720	24,119	Attica
85	Moschato ^{1}	25,322	25,441	23,153	22,039	Attica
86	Nea Filadelfeia ^{1}	25,198	25,734	24,112	25,261	Attica
87	Salamina^{4}	24,997	25,370	25,730	22,567	Attica
88	Eleusis ^{4}	24,971	24,910	25,863	22,793	Attica
89	**Kilkis**	24,130	22,914	17,430	12,139	Central Macedonia
90	**Arta**	24,079	21,895	19,435	19,087	Epirus
91	Oraiokastro ^{5}	23,626	20,852	11,896	5,458	Central Macedonia
92	Melissia ^{1}	23,618	22,741	19,526	13,469	Attica
93	Pallini ^{1}	23,445	16,415	12,552	8,021	Attica
94	Dafni^{1}	23,431	22,913	23,674	24,152	Attica
95	**Livadeia**	22,113	21,379	20,061	18,437	Central Greece
96	Artemida^{4}	21,924	21,488	17,391	9,485	Attica
97	**Argos**	21,891	22,209	24,239	21,901	Peloponnese
98	**Thebes**	21,530	22,883	21,211	19,505	Central Greece
99	**Kos**	21,430	19,432	17,890	14,714	South Aegean
100	Pefki ^{1}	21,293	21,352	19,887	17,987	Attica
101	**Preveza**	21,099	19,042	16,321	13,695	Epirus
102	**Aigio**	20,249	20,422	21,061	22,178	Western Greece
103	**Orestiada**	19,666	18,426	15,246	12,691	Eastern Macedonia and Thrace
104	Thermi ^{5}	19,602	16,004	11,360	5,156	Central Macedonia
105	Nea Erythraia ^{1}	18,604	17,379	15,439	12,993	Attica
106	**Amaliada**	18,223	16,763	18,261	15,232	Western Greece
107	Nea Makri ^{4}	18,114	15,554	13,986	12,120	Attica
108	**Naousa**	18,049	18,882	19,870	19,794	Central Macedonia
109	**Edessa**	17,848	18,229	18,253	17,128	Central Macedonia
110	**Sparta**	17,773	16,239	14,817	13,011	Peloponnese
111	**Kalymnos**	17,752	12,324	10,149	10,543	South Aegean
112	**Ierapetra**	17,710	12,355	11,678	9,541	Crete
113	Panorama ^{5}	17,679	17,444	14,552	10,275	Central Macedonia
114	**Florina**	17,188	17,686	14,279	12,355	Western Macedonia
115	Peraia ^{5}	16,995	18,326	13,306	2,949	Central Macedonia
116	Vari ^{1}	16,717	15,855	10,998	8,488	Attica
117	Elliniko ^{1}	16,715	17,259	16,740	13,517	Attica
118	**Kastoria**	16,393	13,387	14,813	14,775	Western Macedonia
119	Gazi ^{7}	16,256	12,606	8,018	1,395	Crete
120	Paiania ^{4}	16,159	14,595	12,855	9,710	Attica
121	**Alexandreia**	15,906	14,821	13,229	12,109	Central Macedonia
122	Kalyvia Thorikou ^{4}	15,486	14,424	12,202	8,488	Attica
123	Efkarpia ^{2}	15,416	13,905	6,598	3,480	Central Macedonia
124	Agios Ioannis Renti ^{1,3}	15,411	16,050	15,060	14,218	Attica
125	Rafina ^{4}	14,620	12,168	11,352	7,752	Attica
126	**Nafplio**	14,532	14,203	13,822	11,897	Peloponnese
127	Tavros ^{1}	14,339	14,972	14,963	15,456	Attica
128	Menemeni ^{2}	14,297	14,746	14,910	12,932	Central Macedonia
129	**Missolonghi**	13,965	12,785	12,225	10,916	Western Greece
130	Papagou ^{1}	13,962	13,699	13,207	13,974	Attica
131	**Loutraki**	13,919	11,564	11,383	9,388	Peloponnese
132	Drapetsona ^{1,3}	13,815	13,968	12,944	13,094	Attica
133	**Agios Nikolaos**	13,605	11,421	10,080	8,093	Crete
134	Pefka ^{5}	13,435	13,052	6,434	3,561	Central Macedonia
135	Nea Alikarnassos ^{7}	13,090	12,925	11,551	10,683	Crete
136	Spata ^{4}	12,991	9,198	7,738	6,725	Attica
137	**Nafpaktos**	12,950	13,415	12,924	10,854	Western Greece
138	**Ialysos**	12,717	11,331	10,107	7,193	South Aegean
139	**Grevena**	12,515	13,137	10,177	9,345	Western Macedonia
140	Mandra ^{4}	12,365	11,327	10,947	10,012	Attica
141	Glyka Nera ^{1}	11,877	11,049	6,623	5,813	Attica
142	Diavata ^{5}	11,876	9,890	8,423	4,463	Central Macedonia
143	**Tyrnavos**	11,210	11,069	11,116	12,028	Thessaly
144	**Sitia**	11,166	9,348	8,238	7,028	Crete
145	**Ermoupoli**	11,039	11,407	11,799	13,030	South Aegean
146	**Argostoli**	10,982	9,748	9,037	6,815	Ionian Islands
147	Neo Psychiko ^{1}	10,671	10,137	10,848	12,023	Attica
148	Agios Stefanos ^{1}	10,597	9,892	9,271	5,243	Attica
149	Ymittos ^{1}	10,455	10,715	11,139	11,671	Attica
150	Anatoli ^{9}	10,379	9,798	5,815	4,451	Epirus
151	**Igoumenitsa**	10,315	9,145	8,722	6,807	Epirus
152	Nea Artaki ^{10}	10,302	9,489	8,646	7,394	Central Greece
153	**Nea Moudania**	10,042	9,342	6,475	4,403	Central Macedonia

== See also ==
- Alphabetical list of municipalities and communities in Greece
- List of ancient Greek cities
- List of cities
- List of cities in Europe
