= Menemeni =

Suburb of the Thessaloniki Urban Area, Greece

Menemeni Μενεμένη
- Municipal unit
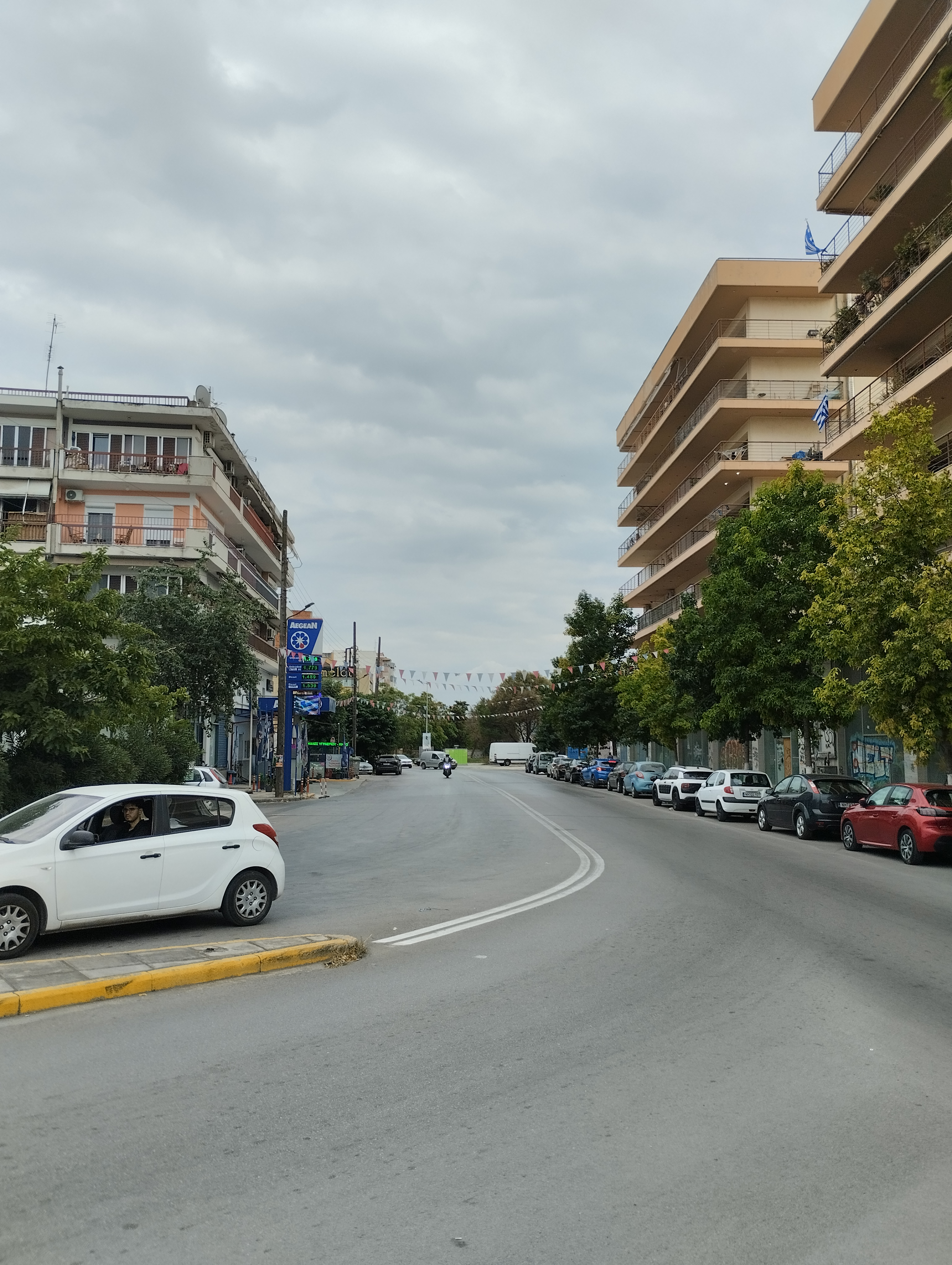

- Location within the regional unit

- Location within Greece
- Coordinates: 40°38′N 22°57′E
- Country: Greece
- Geographic region: Macedonia
- Administrative region: Central Macedonia
- Regional unit: Thessaloniki
- Municipality: Ampelokipoi-Menemeni

Area
  - Municipal unit: 7.989 km^{2} (3.085 sq mi)
- Elevation: 18 m (59 ft)

Population (2021)
  - Municipal unit: 14,297
  - Municipal unit density: 1,790/km^{2} (4,635/sq mi)
- Time zone: UTC+2 (EET)
  - Summer (DST): UTC+3 (EEST)
- Postal code: 56122
- Area code: 02310
- Vehicle registration: Ν
- Website: www.ampelokipi-menemeni.gr

Menemeni (Greek: Μενεμένη) is a suburb of the Thessaloniki Urban Area and was a former municipality in the regional unit of Thessaloniki in Macedonia, Greece. Since the 2011 local government reform it is part of the municipality Ampelokipoi-Menemeni, of which it is a municipal unit. It is neighbored by Evosmos, Ampelokipoi, Thessaloniki and Echedoros. Menemeni includes the quarters of Vosporos, Agios Nektarios, Dialogi and Lachanokipoi.

According to the 2021 census the population was 14,297 inhabitants. The municipal unit has an area of 7.989 km^{2}.

== History ==
Soon after the 1912 release and the incorporation in the national trunk of the Greek territories of Macedonia, the Municipality of Thessaloniki was reorganized by the “official journal of the Hellenic Republic 98/5-5-1918) on 3 May 1918. The particular conditions that prevailed, the local peculiarities and the dynamics of developments determined so much the development of the Municipality of Thessaloniki that the communities slowly began to integrate. Between these also Menemeni, that was created by families of refugees from Menemen, Smyrna (modern Izmir) afterwards the Asia Minor destruction in 1922.

In 1926 Menemeni was extracted from the municipality of Thessaloniki along with the settlements of Charmankioi, Lebet (Stavroupoli), Efkarpia and Kara-Isin (Polichni) and they constituted the Community of Charmankioi, in which were added the settlements of Neos Koukloutzas aka Evosmos, Ampelokipoi, Nea Menemeni and Neo Kordelio. This community included itself once again in the Municipality of Thessalonika in 1929. Until 1934 the Municipality of Thessaloniki included almost entire the built-up urban group of city.

With the “official journal of the Hellenic Republic 23/34” in 1934, important realignments in the administrative limits of Municipality of Thessaloniki came into effect and new communities were created. Thus, the settlements of Menemeni, New Charmankioi, New Bosporus, New Menemeni constituted the Community of Menemeni. The communities of Eleftherio, Menemeni, Pylaia and Triandria were recognized as municipalities afterwards 1981, when population increased bigger than the limit of ten thousands of residents.

== Transportation ==
Public transport in Menemeni is currently served only by buses (Route 20 Menemeni-Ermou). The bus company operating throughout the city is called Organismos Astikon Sygkoinonion Thessalonikis (OASTH).

An underground service is about to be launched near 2010 operating, at the beginning at least, mainly in the center of the Thessaloniki city. Further expansions on the west side are still under consideration for the "Thessaloniki Metro".

== People ==
- Stelios Kitsiou, Greek footballer
- Daniil Papadopoulos, Greek footballer

== See also ==
- List of settlements in the Thessaloniki regional unit

== Twinnings ==
- Menemen, Turkey
