= Kordelio-Evosmos =

Kordelio-Evosmos Κορδελιό-Εύοσμος
- Municipality
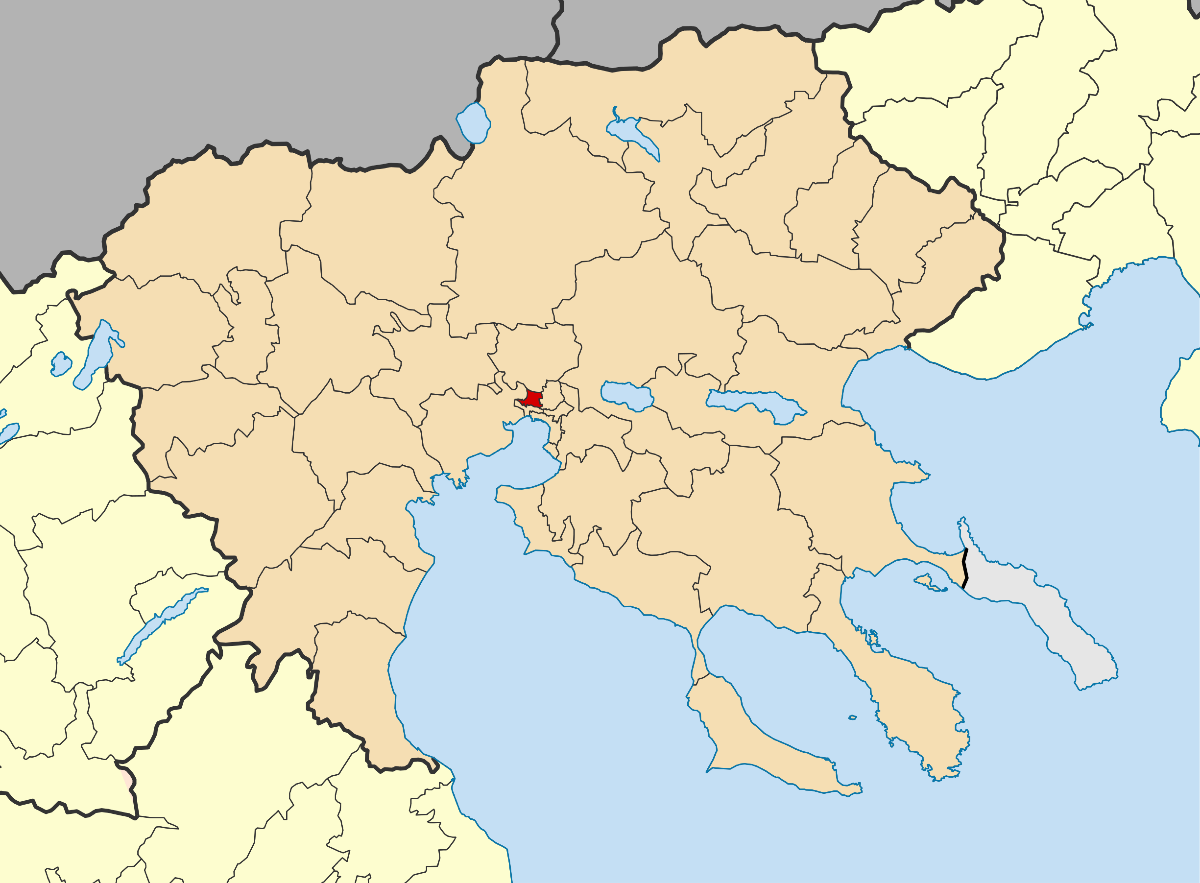

- Location within Greece
- Coordinates: 40°40′N 22°54′E
- Country: Greece
- Administrative region: Central Macedonia
- Regional unit: Thessaloniki
- Seat: Evosmos

Government
  - Mayor: Eleftherios Alexandridis (since 2023)

Area
  - Municipality: 13.36 km^{2} (5.16 sq mi)

Population (2021)
  - Municipality: 105,352
  - Density: 7,886/km^{2} (20,420/sq mi)
- Time zone: UTC+2 (EET)
  - Summer (DST): UTC+3 (EEST)
- Website: www.kordelio-evosmos.gr

Kordelio–Evosmos (Greek: Κορδελιό-Εύοσμος, Kordelió-Évosmos) is a municipality of the Thessaloniki Urban Area in the regional unit of Thessaloniki, Central Macedonia, Greece. The seat of the municipality is in Evosmos. The municipality has an area of 13.358 km^{2} and a population of 105,352 people (2021 census).

== Municipality ==
The municipality Kordelio–Evosmos was formed at the 2011 local government reform by the merger of the following 2 former municipalities, that became municipal units:

- Eleftherio-Kordelio
- Evosmos

== Neighbourhoods ==
=== Municipal Unit of Evosmos ===
- Evangelismos
- Agios Kosmas
- Kato Evosmos
- Kato Ilioupoli
- Nea Politeia
- Ano Nea Politeia

=== Municipal Unit of Kordelio ===
- Neo Kordelio
- Eleftheria
- Dialogi

== Transportation ==
In the area an important number of bus lines are operated both by the Thessaloniki Urban Transport Organization and Thessaloniki's KTEL (KTEL (Greece)). Those being:

- 1 Efkarpia – Nosokomeio Papageorgiou – KTEL (Thessaloniki Intercity Bus Station)
- 18 Agioi Anargyroi – Kordelio
- 19 Eleftherio Kordelio – Neos Sidirodromikos Stathmos (Thessaloniki railway station)
- 20 Menemeni – Aristotelous
- 21 Evosmos – Aristotelous
- 21A Evosmos – Aristotelous through Koimitiria Evosmou (Western Thessaloniki Cemeteries)
- 32 Kato Ilioupoli – Aristotelous
- 32A Kato Ilioupoli – Aristotelous through Gymnastirio
- 42 Kordelio – Koimitiria Evosmou (Western Thessaloniki Cemeteries)
- 42A Kordelio – Koimitiria Evosmou through Menemeni
- 42B Kordelio – Koimitiria Evosmou through Ampelokipoi
- 43 Topiko Evosmou (Evosmos Local Line)
- 43Y Evosmos – Voulgari (Express Line)

== Population ==
Year	Population	
Year	Evosmos	Kordelio
1940	1,475	1,554
1951	2,055	1,951
1961	7,713	4,430
1971	22,390	9,159
1981	26,528	12,595
1991	29,331	16,885
2001	54,825	22,349
2011	74.686	27.067
2021	79,221	26,131

== List of mayors of Kordelio-Evosmos ==
The list includes the Mayors of Evosmos as predecessors to the Mayors of Kordelio-Evosmos since the seat of the municipality remained in Evosmos.

#	Name	Term			Party
#	Name	Term start	Term end	Term Duration	Party
Mayors of Evosmos (1973–2010)
1	Savas Daniilidis	21 February 1973	4 October 1974	1 year, 194 days	Independent
2	Eleftherios Polichroniadis	4 October 1974	30 May 1975	239 days	Independent
3	Stamatis Dionysiou	1 June 1975	31 December 1990	15 years, 210 days	Communist
4	Panagiotis Alexandridis	1 January 1991	31 December 2006	16 years	Independent
5	Demetrios Chatzivretas	1 January 2007	31 December 2010	4 years	Independent
Mayors of Kordelio-Evosmos (2010 – today)
1	Efstathios Lafazanidis	1 January 2011	31 August 2014	3 years, 240 days	Independent
2	Petros Soulas	1 September 2014	31 August 2019	5 years	Independent
3	Kleanthis Mandalianos	1 September 2019	31 December 2023	4 years, 122 days	Independent
4	Eleftherios Alexandridis	1 January 2024	Incumbent	In office	Independent
