= Chrysanthos Theodoridis =

Greek singer and songwriter

Chrysanthos
- Born: 22 December 1923
- Died: 30 March 2005 (aged 71)
- Resting place: Polichni
- Citizenship: Greece
- Occupations: Singer, songwriter
- Style: Pontic Greek, Éntekhno
- Partner: Anastasia Pachatouridou (m. 1967)
- Relatives: Eulabia Theodoridou (sister); Ilias Theodoridis (brother)

Chrysanthos Theodoridis, or simply Chrysanthos (Greek: Χρύσανθος Θεοδωρίδης; 22 December 1934 – 30 March 2005) was a Greek singer and songwriter. He was born in Oinoi, Kozani to a Pontic Greek family from Kars and he wrote several songs for the Pontic music. He became a symbol for the people from Pontus worldwide. He died of a heart attack in Greece and his body was placed to accept pilgrimage by hundreds of people. Apart from the songs of Pontus, he also sang artistic songs, while collaborating with Christodoulos Chalaris.
