= Neapoli, Thessaloniki =

Suburb of the Thessaloniki Urban Area, Greece

Neapoli Νεάπολη
- Municipal unit
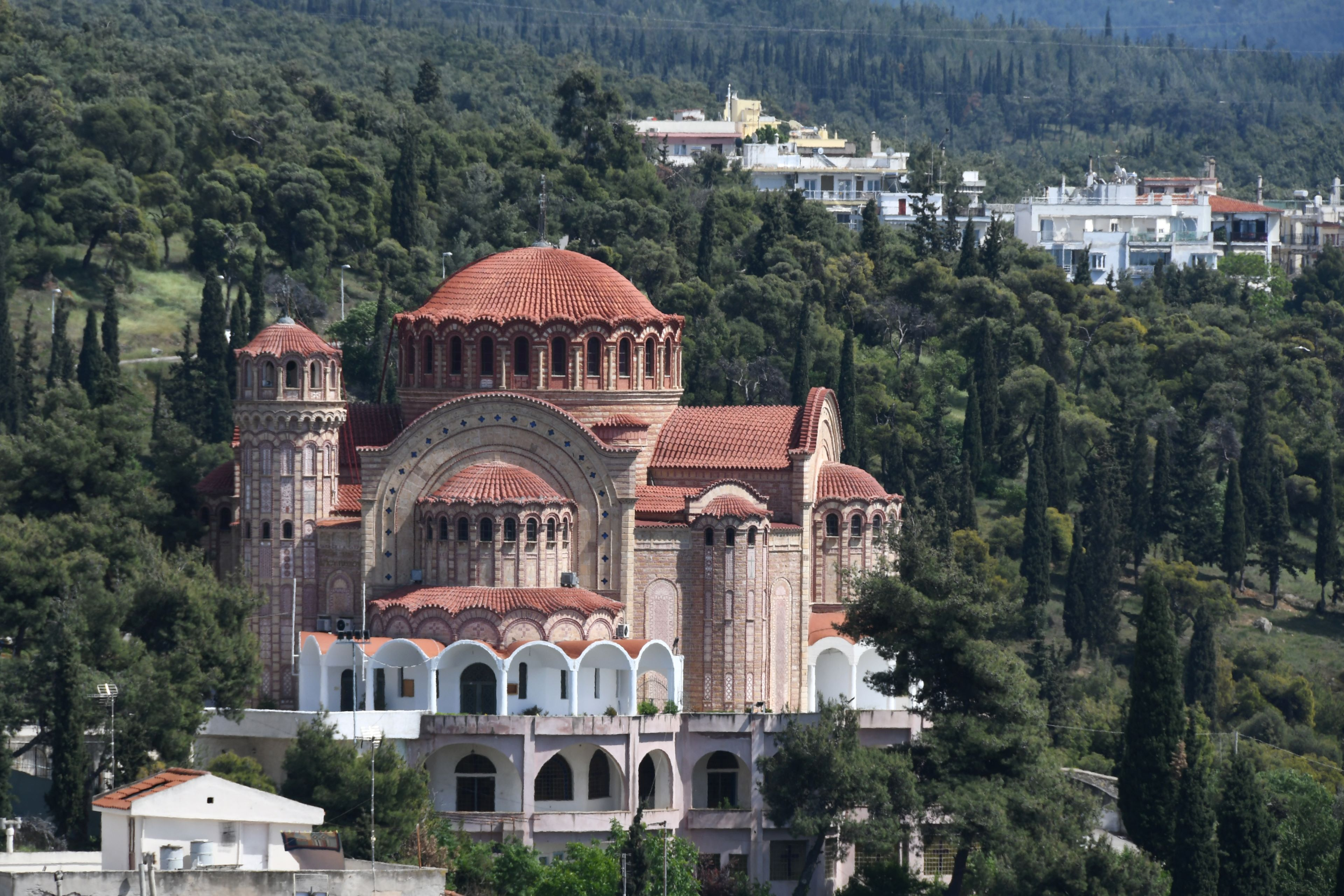
- St Paul (Agios Pavlos) church in the area

- Location within the regional unit

- Location within Greece
- Coordinates: 40°39′10″N 22°56′30″E
- Country: Greece
- Geographic region: Macedonia
- Administrative region: Central Macedonia
- Regional unit: Thessaloniki
- Municipality: Neapoli-Sykies

Area
  - Municipal unit: 1.168 km^{2} (0.451 sq mi)
- Elevation: 70 m (230 ft)

Population (2021)
  - Municipal unit: 25,822
  - Municipal unit density: 22,110/km^{2} (57,260/sq mi)
- Time zone: UTC+2 (EET)
  - Summer (DST): UTC+3 (EEST)

Neapoli (Greek: Νεάπολη) is a suburb of the Thessaloniki Urban Area and a former municipality in the regional unit of Thessaloniki, Macedonia, Greece. Since the 2011 local government reform it is part of the municipality Neapoli-Sykies, of which it is a municipal unit. The municipal unit population is 25,822 (2021 census), while its land area is only 1.168 km^{2} (0.45 sq mi), with a resulting population density of 22,108/km^{2} (57,260/sq mi), making it one of the densest places in the world.

== Geography ==
Neapoli is located northwest of the city center of Thessaloniki. Its neighboring suburbs are those of Polichni, Stavroupoli, Sykies, Thessaloniki and Ampelokipoi. There are eight districts in Neapoli: Neapoli, Piropathon, Kato Anagennisi, Pano Anagennisi, Kountourioti, Troada, Riga Feraiou, Hydragogio.

== People ==
- Giannis Aggelakas, musician
- Christos Sartzetakis, former President of Greece
