= Oine =

Oine may refer to:

- Kusumoto Ine, Japanese physician
- Oene (disambiguation), various places in Greece
