= Tehni Macedonian Art Association (Thessaloniki) =

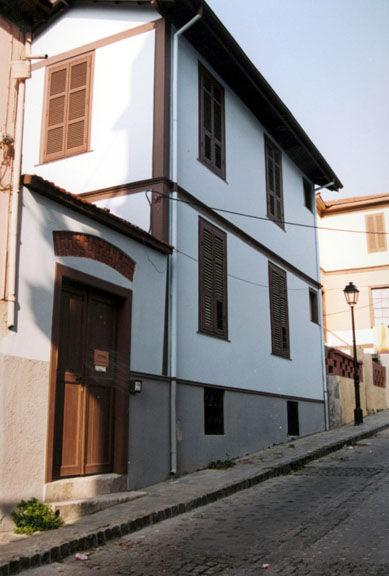
View from outside

Tehni Tehni Macedonian Art Association, or Tehni, was established in 1951, in Thessaloniki, Macedonia, Greece with the aim of cultivating and disseminating art and literature in Thessaloniki and the rest of Northern Greece. It helped to found the State Orchestra of Thessaloniki, the Thessaloniki Film Festival, and the State Theatre of Northern Greece, and assisted in the expansion of art activities by setting up similar associations in provincial towns. In 1999, Tehni moved into a restored, listed building next to the Byzantine walls in Ano Poli, Thessalonikis Upper Town.

Tehni runs a film club, a youth centre, a theatre workshop, a music workshop and a lending library specialising in music and drama. The Tehni art gallery consists of a collection of important paintings by 75 contemporary Greek painters and a collection of 370 engravings representative of Greek output in the 20th century.

The paintings are not on permanent display due to lack of space. However, the association sponsors exhibitions in Thessaloniki and northern Greece. In 1999, the engravings, grouped in four generations (1879–1967), were exhibited in Thessaloniki (Vafopoulos Cultural Centre and Neapoli Town Hall), Florina, and Kavala.

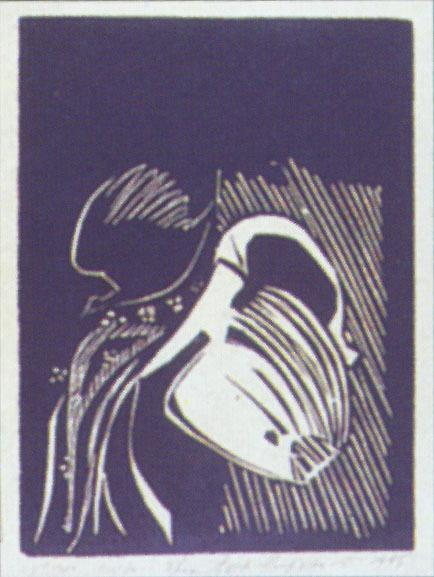

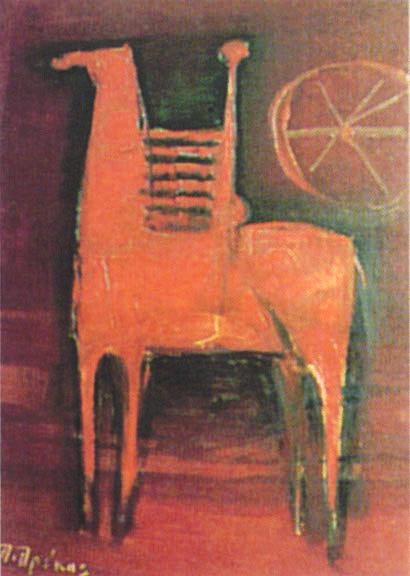

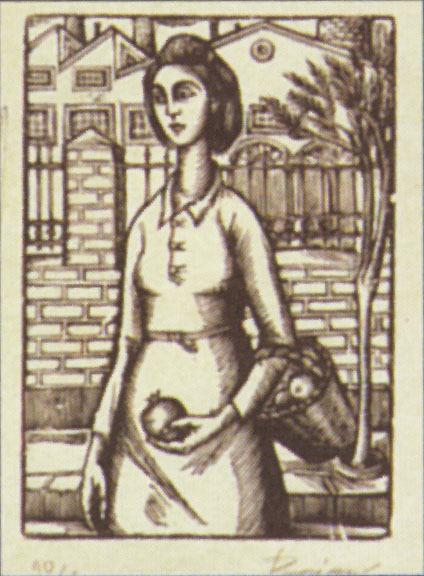

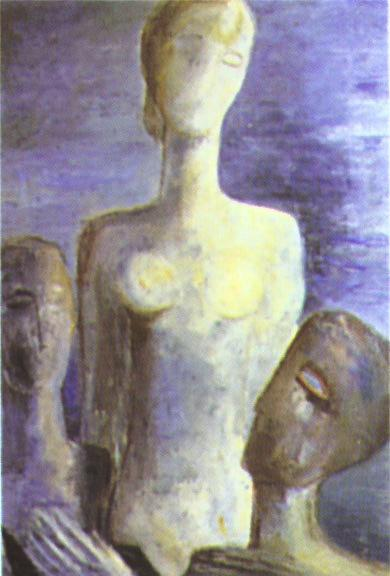
