= Thessaloniki (regional unit) =

Thessaloniki Μητροπολιτική ενότητα Θεσσαλονίκης
- Regional unit
- Municipalities of Thessaloniki

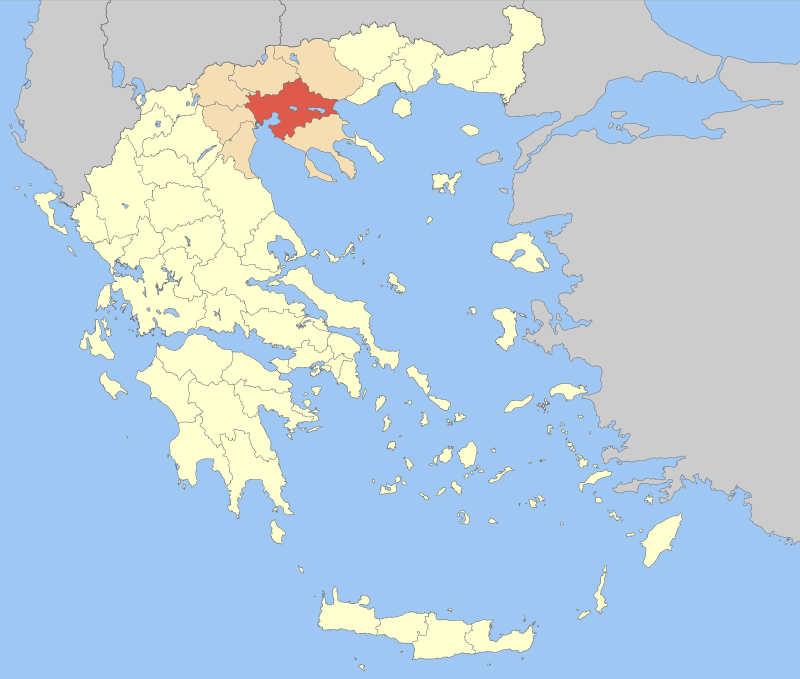
- Thessaloniki within Greece

- Location within Greece
- Coordinates: 40°40′N 23°10′E
- Country: Greece
- Administrative region: Central Macedonia
- Seat: Thessaloniki

Area
  - Total: 3,683 km^{2} (1,422 sq mi)

Population (2021)
  - Total: 1,092,919
  - Density: 296.7/km^{2} (768.6/sq mi)
- Time zone: UTC+2 (EET)
  - Summer (DST): UTC+3 (EEST)
- Postal code: 54x xx - 57x xx
- Area code: 231, 2391-2397
- Vehicle registration: N
- Website: pkm.gov.gr

Thessaloniki (Greek: Μητροπολιτική ενότητα Θεσσαλονίκης Mitropolitiki enotita Thessaloníkis, Metropolitan unit of Thessaloniki) is one of the regional units of Greece. It is part of the region of Central Macedonia and its capital is the city of Thessaloniki.

== Geography ==
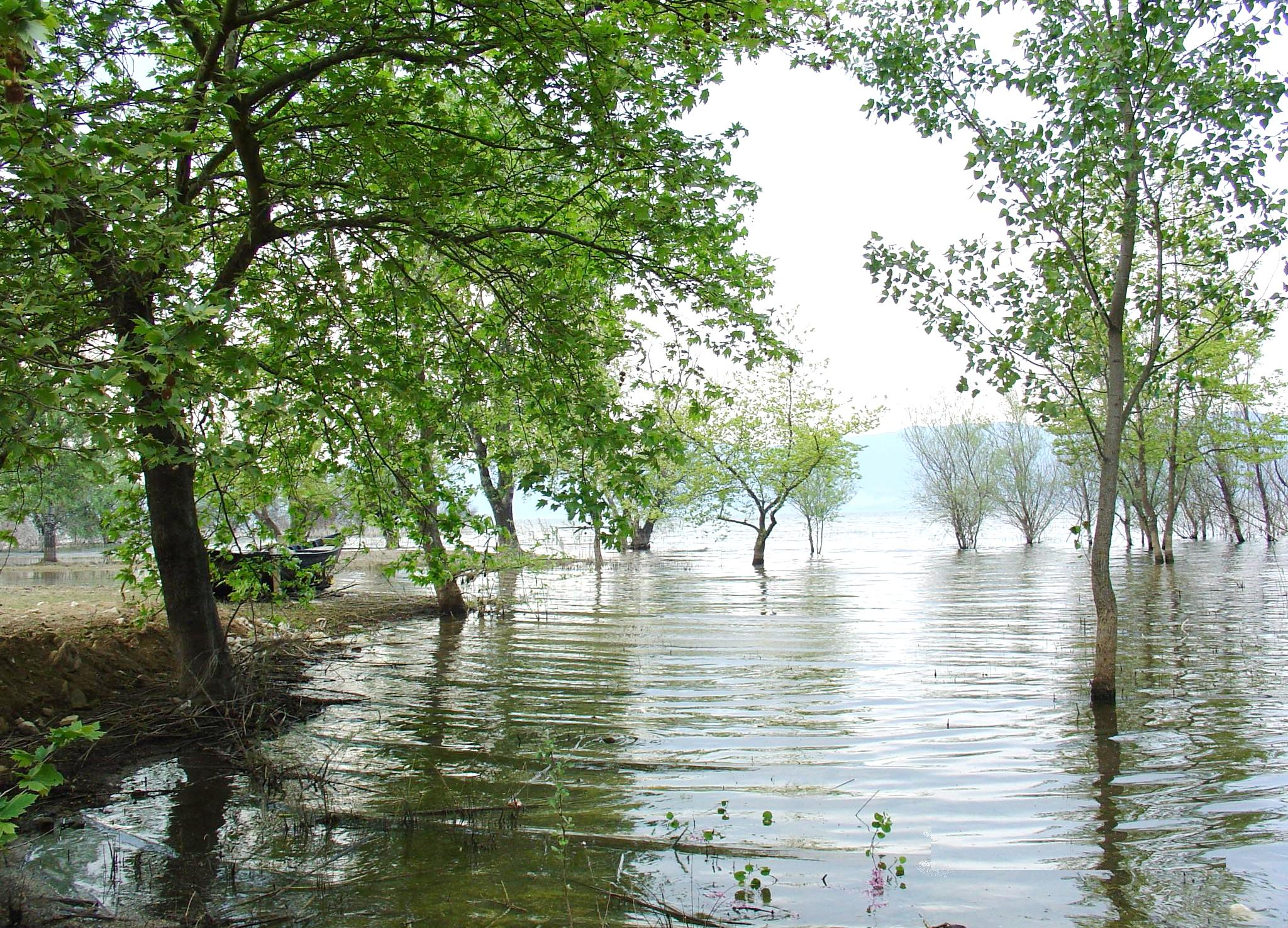
Lake Volvi

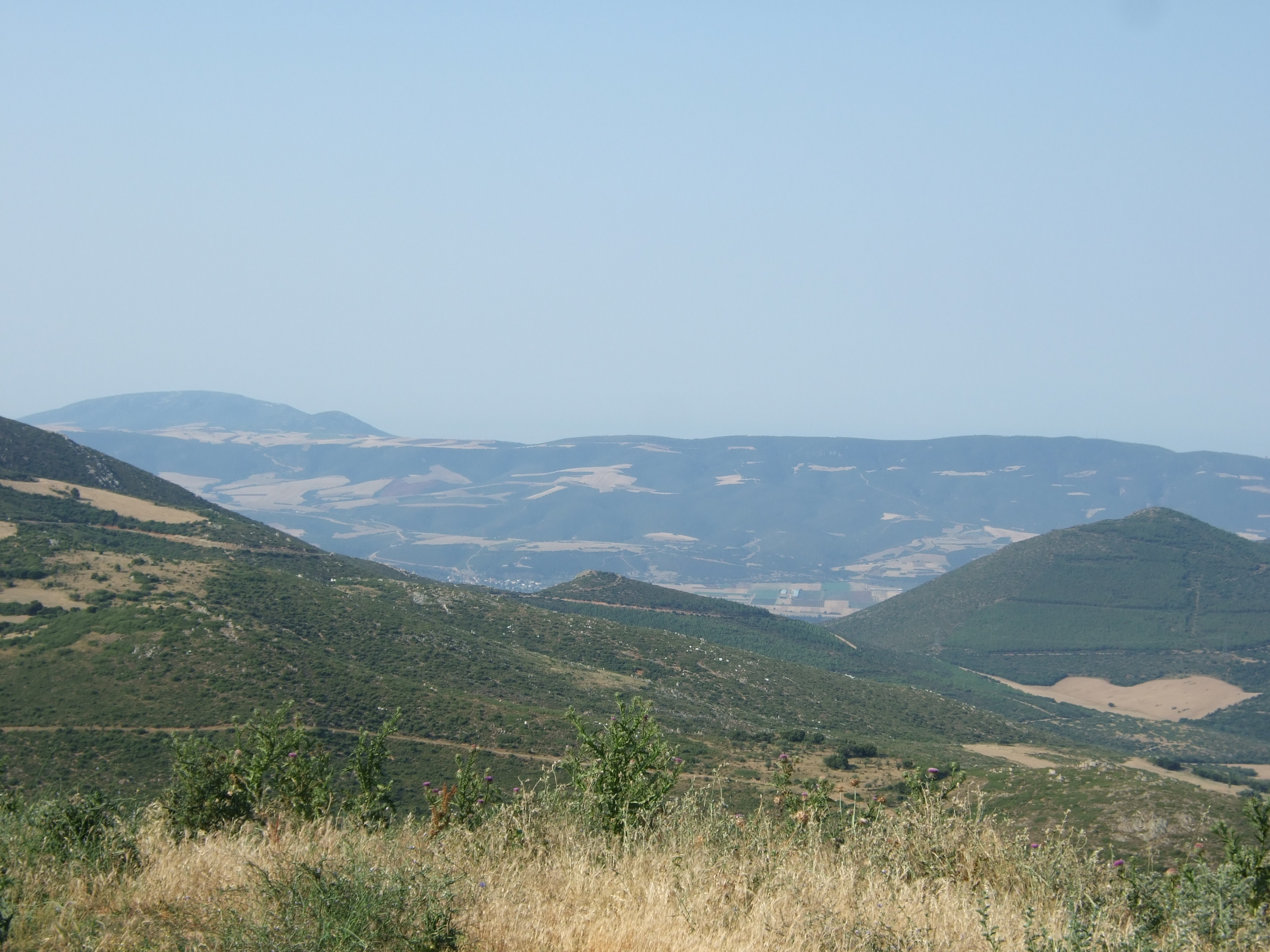
Mount Chortiatis

The regional unit stretches from the Thermaic Gulf in the southwest to the Strymonic Gulf in the east. Two bodies of water are located in the north, Lake Koroneia in the heart of the regional unit and Lake Volvi in the east. There are farmlands throughout the west and southwest, with fewer in the northeast, north and along the Axios River valley. Mountainous areas include the Chortiatis in the west-central part, the Vertiskos in the north and parts of the Kerdylio mountains in the northeast. The regional unit borders on the Imathia regional unit to the southwest, Pella to the west, Kilkis to the north, Serres to the east and Chalkidiki to the south.

Its climate includes hot Mediterranean summers and cool to mild winters in low-lying areas and plains. Winter weather is very common in areas 500m above sea level and into the mountains.

== History ==
The area that was to become the Thessaloniki regional unit was annexed by Greece in 1912, during the First Balkan War. The area was struck by an earthquake in 1978, and by flooding due to rainfall in October 2006. Mustafa Kemal Atatürk, founder of modern Turkey, was born in Salonica, the name for the city of Thessaloniki when it was part of the Ottoman Empire.

== Administration ==
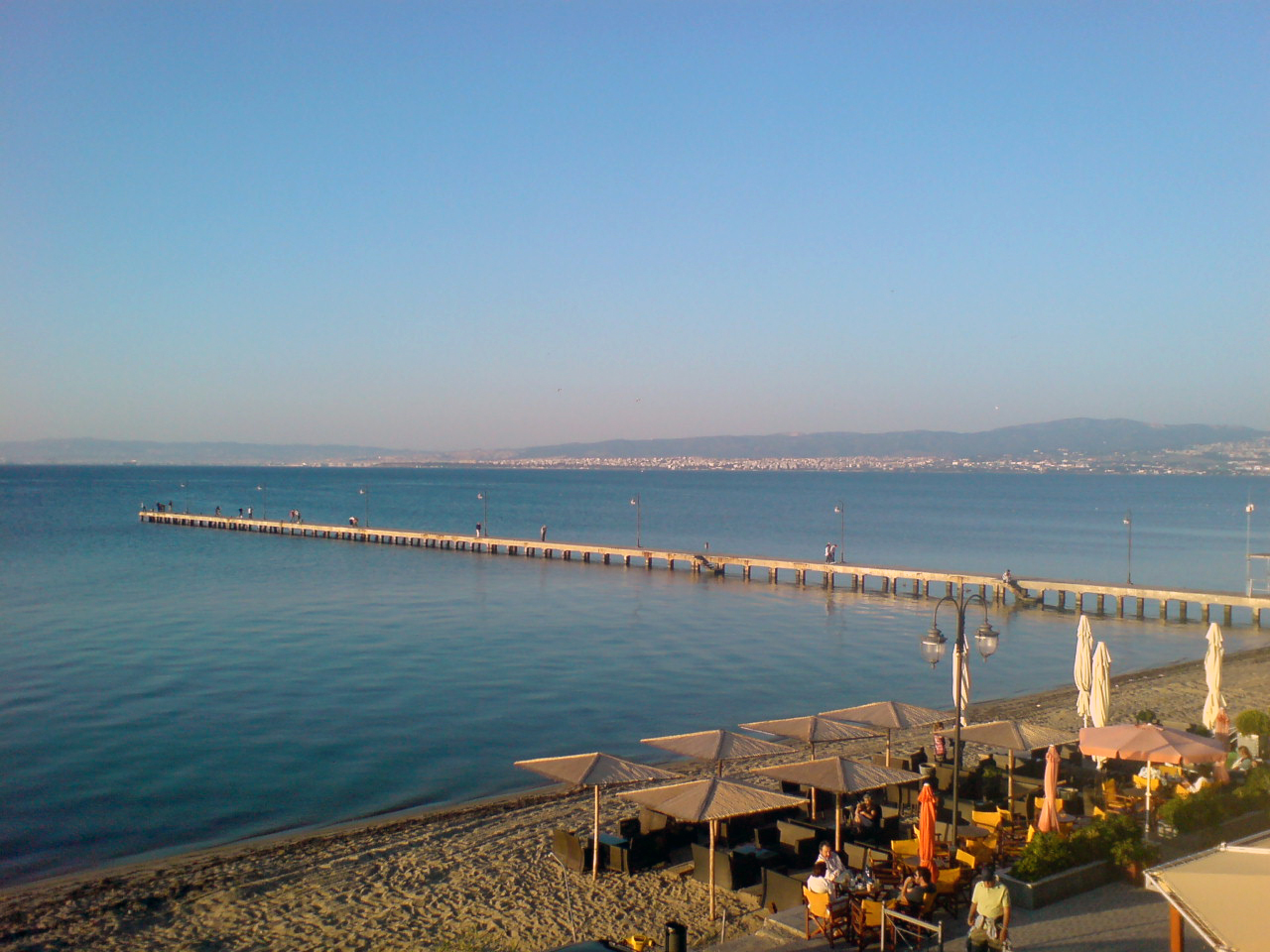
View of Thermaic Gulf from Peraia.

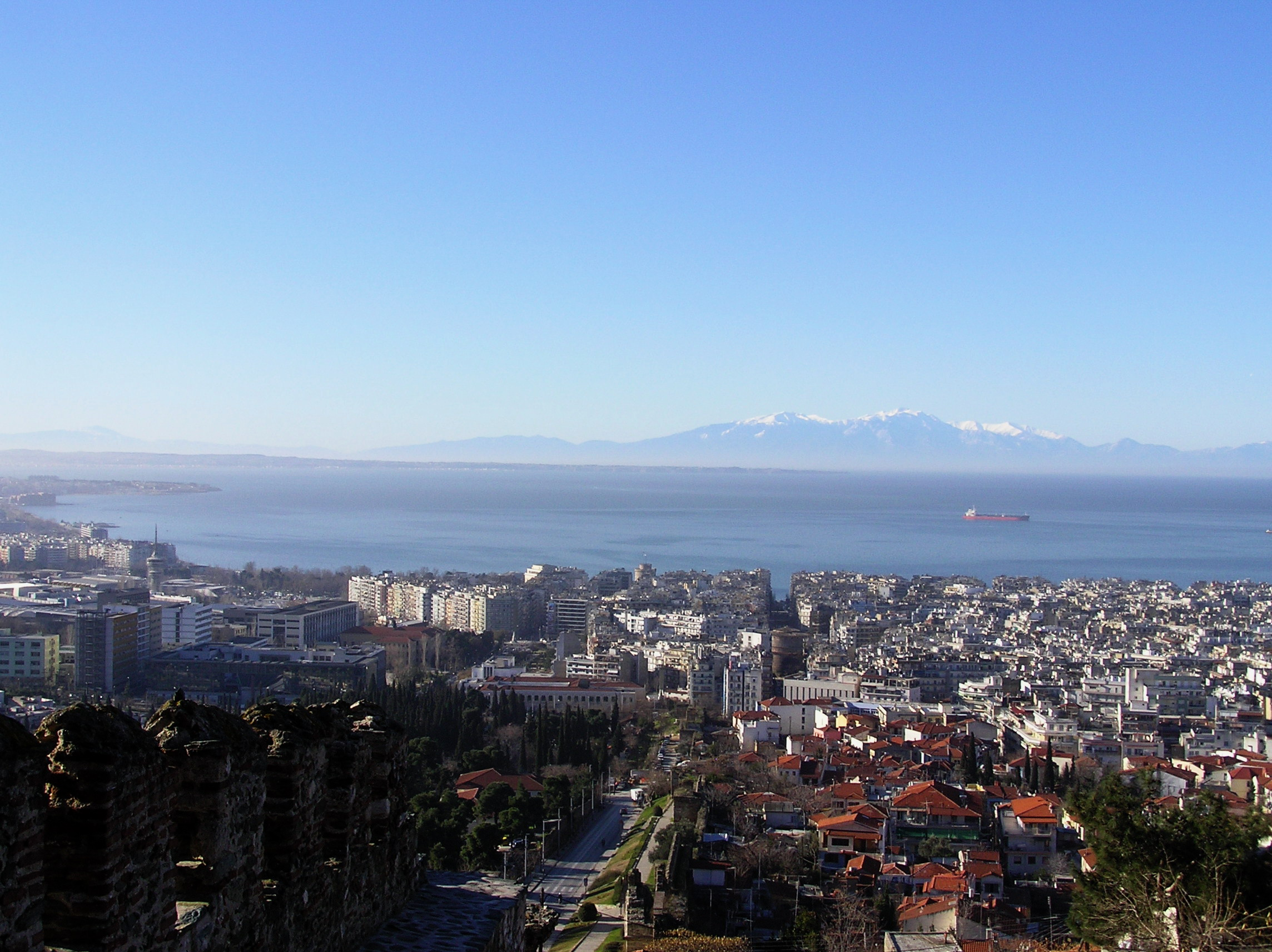
Thessaloniki

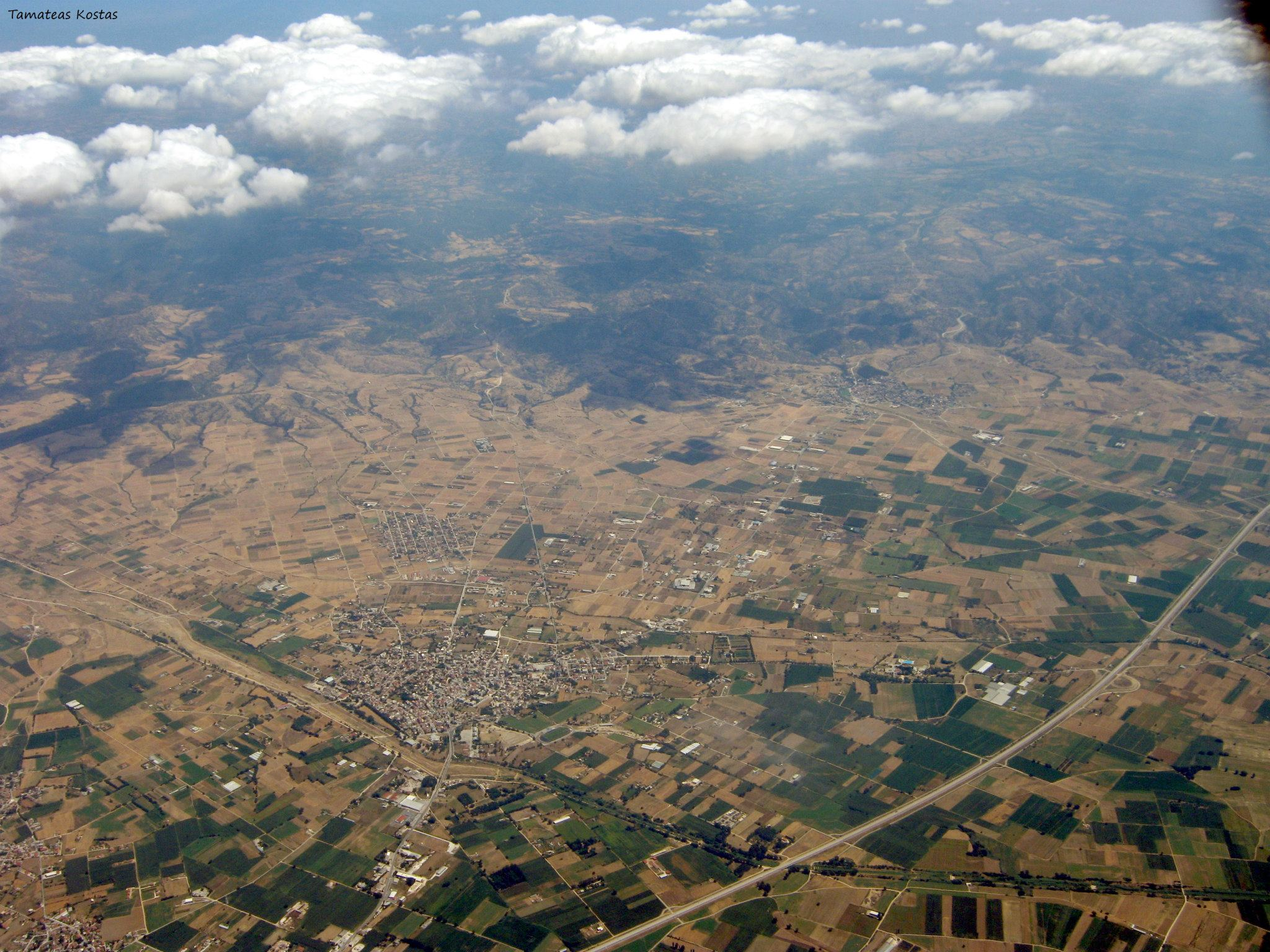
Langadas

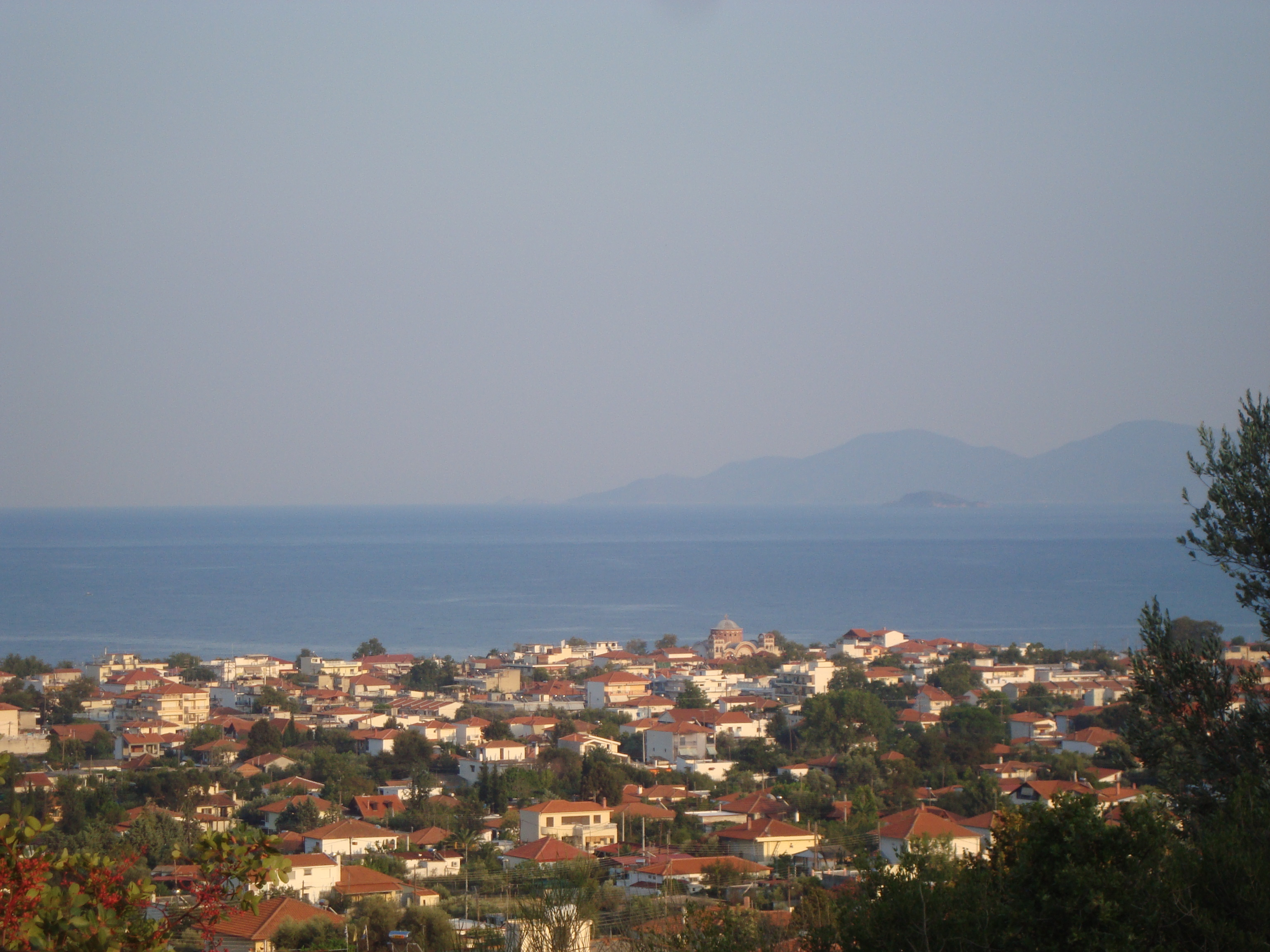
Asprovalta

=== Municipalities ===
The Thessaloniki regional unit is subdivided into 14 municipalities. These are:

(Number corresponds to the map in the infobox.)

- Ampelokipoi-Menemeni (2)
- Chalkidona (13)
- Delta (4)
- Kalamaria (7)
- Kordelio-Evosmos (8)
- Lagkadas (9)
- Neapoli-Sykies (10)
- Oraiokastro (14)
- Pavlos Melas (11)
- Pylaia-Chortiatis (12)
- Thermaikos (5)
- Thermi (6)
- Thessaloniki (1)
- Volvi (3)

=== Prefecture ===
The Thessaloniki Prefecture (Greek: Νομός Θεσσαλονίκης) was created when the area was annexed by Greece during the First Balkan War in 1913. At that time. its area was the largest prefecture in the country, covering about 7% of the total land. The prefectures of Pella and Kilkis were split off in 1930 and 1937 respectively, and after World War II in 1947, Imathia and Pieria were additionally created from land belonging to the Thessaloniki Prefecture.

As a part of the 2011 Kallikratis administrative reform, the prefecture was transformed into a regional unit within the Central Macedonia region, without any change in boundaries. At the same time, the municipalities were reorganized, according to the table below.

New municipality	Old municipalities	Seat
Ampelokipoi-Menemeni	Ampelokipoi	Ampelokipoi
Ampelokipoi-Menemeni	Menemeni	Ampelokipoi
Chalkidona	Chalkidona	Koufalia
Chalkidona	Agios Athanasios	Koufalia
Chalkidona	Koufalia	Koufalia
Delta	Axios	Sindos
Delta	Echedoros	Sindos
Delta	Chalastra	Sindos
Kalamaria	Kalamaria	Kalamaria
Kordelio-Evosmos	Eleftherio-Kordelio	Evosmos
Kordelio-Evosmos	Evosmos	Evosmos
Lagkadas	Lagkadas	Lagkadas
Lagkadas	Assiros	Lagkadas
Lagkadas	Vertiskos	Lagkadas
Lagkadas	Kallindoia	Lagkadas
Lagkadas	Koroneia	Lagkadas
Lagkadas	Lachanas	Lagkadas
Lagkadas	Sochos	Lagkadas
Neapoli-Sykies	Neapoli	Sykies
Neapoli-Sykies	Agios Pavlos	Sykies
Neapoli-Sykies	Pefka	Sykies
Neapoli-Sykies	Sykies	Sykies
Oraiokastro	Oraiokastro	Oraiokastro
Oraiokastro	Kallithea	Oraiokastro
Oraiokastro	Mygdonia	Oraiokastro
Pavlos Melas	Efkarpia	Stavroupoli
Pavlos Melas	Polichni	Stavroupoli
Pavlos Melas	Stavroupoli	Stavroupoli
Pylaia-Chortiatis	Panorama	Panorama
Pylaia-Chortiatis	Pylaia	Panorama
Pylaia-Chortiatis	Chortiatis	Panorama
Thermaikos	Thermaikos	Peraia
Thermaikos	Epanomi	Peraia
Thermaikos	Michaniona	Peraia
Thermi	Thermi	Thermi
Thermi	Vasilika	Thermi
Thermi	Mikra	Thermi
Thessaloniki	Thessaloniki	Thessaloniki
Thessaloniki	Triandria	Thessaloniki
Volvi	Rentina	Stavros
Volvi	Agios Georgios	Stavros
Volvi	Apollonia	Stavros
Volvi	Arethousa	Stavros
Volvi	Egnatia	Stavros
Volvi	Madytos	Stavros

== Provinces ==
- Province of Thessaloniki
- Province of Lagkadas

Note: Provinces no longer hold any legal status in Greece.

== Transport ==
=== Railways ===
The Thessaloniki regional unit has railways that mainly radiate westbound from the city's main railway station. The three main railways in the regional unit are Thessaloniki–Alexandroupolis, Thessaloniki–Bitola, and Thessaloniki–Skopje: there is also a connection between Adendro and Gefyra, allowing trains to travel between Athens and Skopje without needing to reverse at Thessaloniki.

=== Roads and highways ===
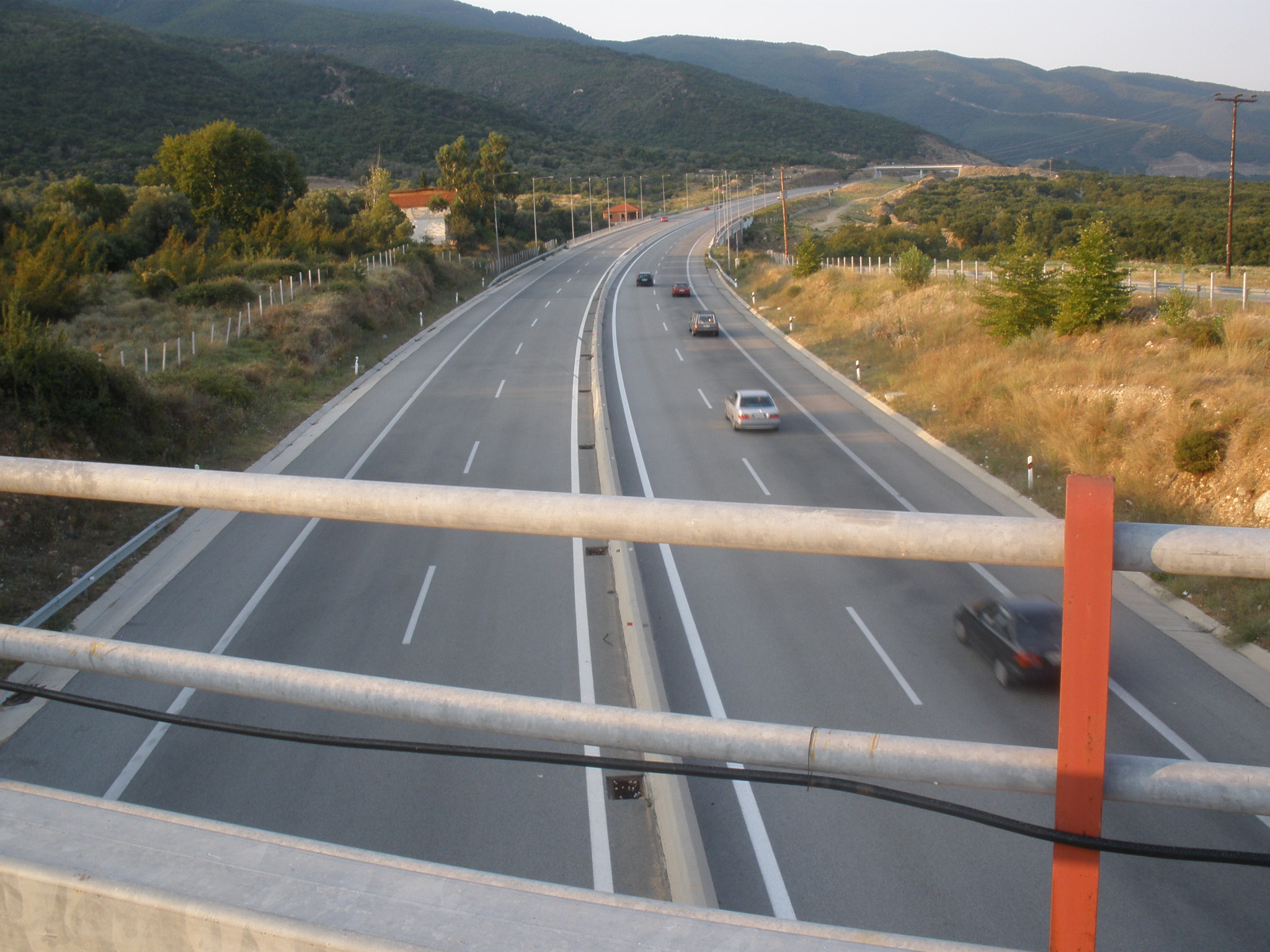
A2 motorway (Egnatia Odos)

The Thessaloniki regional unit is served by many main roads: the A1 motorway (E75) leads to Athens and the border with North Macedonia near Evzonoi; the A2 (E90) leads to Igoumenitsa and the border with Turkey near Kipoi; and the A25 (E79) leads to Serres and the border with Bulgaria near Promachonas. The A24 is an expressway towards Nea Moudania, with a small section of motorway at the northern end of the ring road, while the A242 is a spur of the A24, towards Thessaloniki Airport.

The national roads in the regional unit are: the ΕΟ1 and its newer equivalent ΕΟ1a, ΕΟ2 (E86 west of Gefyra), ΕΟ12, ΕΟ16, ΕΟ65 and ΕΟ67, as well as the Liti–Nea Santa National Road, Nea Diagonios and the Thessaloniki Inner Ring Road.

==== History ====
Until the A1/E75 motorway (constructed during the 1970s) and the A2/E90 motorway (constructed during the 1990s) were constructed, the EO1 and EO2 were the main road links connecting the regional unit of Thessaloniki with other parts of the country. Furthermore, parts of the A24 expressway linking Chalkidiki, and the EO65 linking Kilkis, were upgraded during the 2000s.

=== Mass transit ===
- Public transport services are provided by the Thessaloniki Urban Transport Organization
- Thessaloniki Metro

== Communications ==
Most of the stations are in the city (see Thessaloniki#Communications). Here are list of stations outside the city:

- Thermi TV - Thermi

== Major Sport Clubs ==
- Iraklis (founded in 1908)
- Aris (founded in 1914)
- PAOK (founded in 1926)
- Apollon Kalamarias (founded in 1926)
- Agrotikos Asteras (founded in 1932)

== See also ==
- List of settlements in the Thessaloniki regional unit
- Macedonia (Greece)
