= Oenoe =

Oenoe (Ancient Greek: Οἰνόη; Greek: Οινόη), also written Oinoi or Oene, may refer to:

== Places ==
- Oenoe (Attica), a town of ancient Attica
- Oenoe (Argolis), a town of ancient Argolis, Greece
- Oenoe (Corinthia), a fort of ancient Corinthia, Greece
- Oenoe (Elis), a town of ancient Elis, Greece
- Oenoe (Icaria), an ancient city on the island of Icaria, Greece
- Oenoe (Locris), a city of ancient Locris, Greece
- Oenoe (Marathon), a town of ancient Attica, near Marathon
- Oinoi, Greece, a village in the municipality of Mandra-Eidyllia, West Attica, Greece
- Oinoi, Boeotia, a village in the municipality of Tanagra, Greece
- Oinoi, Kastoria, a village in the municipality of Kastoria, Greece
- Oinoi, Kozani, part of the city of Kozani, Greece
- Oenoe, the ancient Greek name of Ünye, Turkey
- Oenoe, the ancient name of Sikinos, an island of Greece

== Other uses ==
- Battle of Oenoe, a 460 battle in Attica in the First Peloponnesian War
- Oenoe (mythology), several characters in Greek mythology
- Oenoe (moth), a genus of moths

== See also ==
- Oene, Gelderland, a village in Gelderland, The Netherlands
