= Agios Pavlos, Thessaloniki =

Suburb of the Thessaloniki Urban Area, Greece

Agios Pavlos Άγιος Παύλος
- Municipal unit
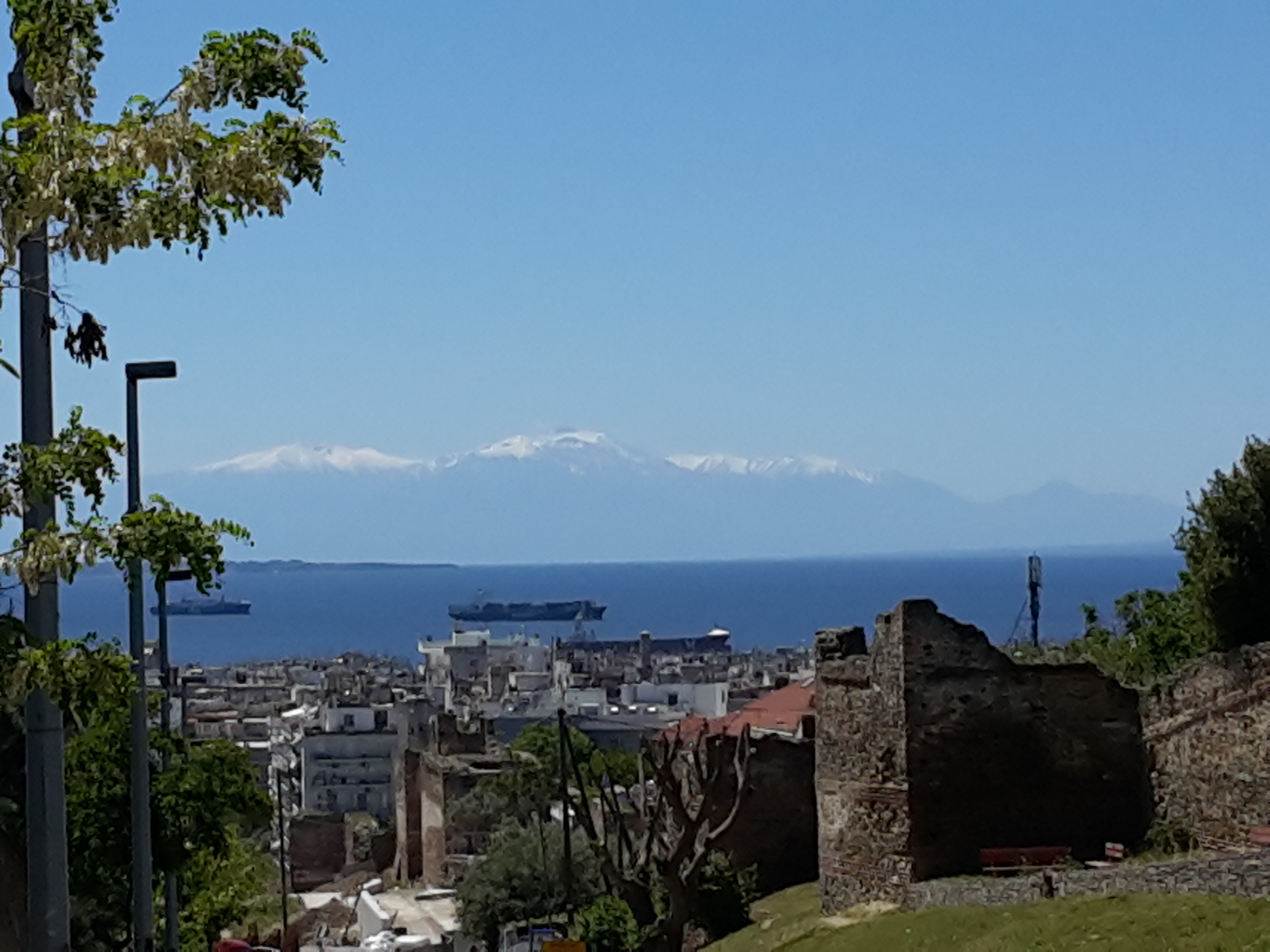

- Location within the regional unit

- Location within Greece
- Coordinates: 40°38.6′N 22°57.7′E
- Country: Greece
- Geographic region: Macedonia
- Administrative region: Central Macedonia
- Regional unit: Thessaloniki
- Municipality: Neapoli-Sykies

Area
  - Municipal unit: 1.953 km^{2} (0.754 sq mi)
- Elevation: 140 m (460 ft)

Population (2021)
  - Municipal unit: 6,086
  - Municipal unit density: 3,116/km^{2} (8,071/sq mi)
- Time zone: UTC+2 (EET)
  - Summer (DST): UTC+3 (EEST)
- Postal code: 554 38
- Area code: +30-231
- Vehicle registration: NA to NX

Agios Pavlos (Greek: Άγιος Παύλος, lit. 'Saint Paul') is a suburb of the Thessaloniki Urban Area and a former municipality in Macedonia, Greece. Since the 2011 local government reform it is part of the municipality of Neapoli-Sykies, of which it is a municipal unit. The 2021 census recorded 6,086 people in Agios Pavlos. The municipal unit of Agios Pavlos covers an area of 1.953 km^{2}.

== Notable people ==
- Giorgos Koudas, football player

== Sister cities ==
- * (Malta) Saint Paul's Bay

== See also ==
- List of settlements in the Thessaloniki regional unit
