= Eleftherio-Kordelio =

Suburb of the Thessaloniki Urban Area, Greece

Eleftherio-Kordelio Ελευθέριο-Κορδελιό
- Municipal unit
- Location within the regional unit

- Location within Greece
- Coordinates: 40°40′N 22°54′E
- Country: Greece
- Geographic region: Macedonia
- Administrative region: Central Macedonia
- Regional unit: Thessaloniki
- Municipality: Kordelio-Evosmos

Area
  - Municipal unit: 3.431 km^{2} (1.325 sq mi)
- Elevation: 18 m (59 ft)

Population (2021)
  - Municipal unit: 26,131
  - Municipal unit density: 7,616/km^{2} (19,730/sq mi)
- Time zone: UTC+2 (EET)
  - Summer (DST): UTC+3 (EEST)

Eleftherio-Kordelio (Greek: Ελευθέριο-Κορδελιό, Elefthério-Kordelió) is a suburb of the Thessaloniki Urban Area and a former municipality of the regional unit of Thessaloniki, Macedonia, Greece. Since the 2011 local government reform it is part of the municipality Kordelio-Evosmos, of which it is a municipal unit. It gained its present form in 1982, after the union of the then municipalities of Eleftheria and Neo Kordelio. They were formed in 1924 by Greek refugees from the town of Kordelio on the west coast of Asia Minor. In the Ottoman Empire the region and the small village that stood in the same area was known as Harmanköy.

Eleftherio-Kordelio covers an area of 3.431 km^{2} with 26,131 inhabitants in 2021. In this region is located the Railway Museum of Thessaloniki.
