= Ampelokipoi-Menemeni =

Ampelokipoi-Menemeni Αμπελόκηποι-Μενεμένη
- Municipality
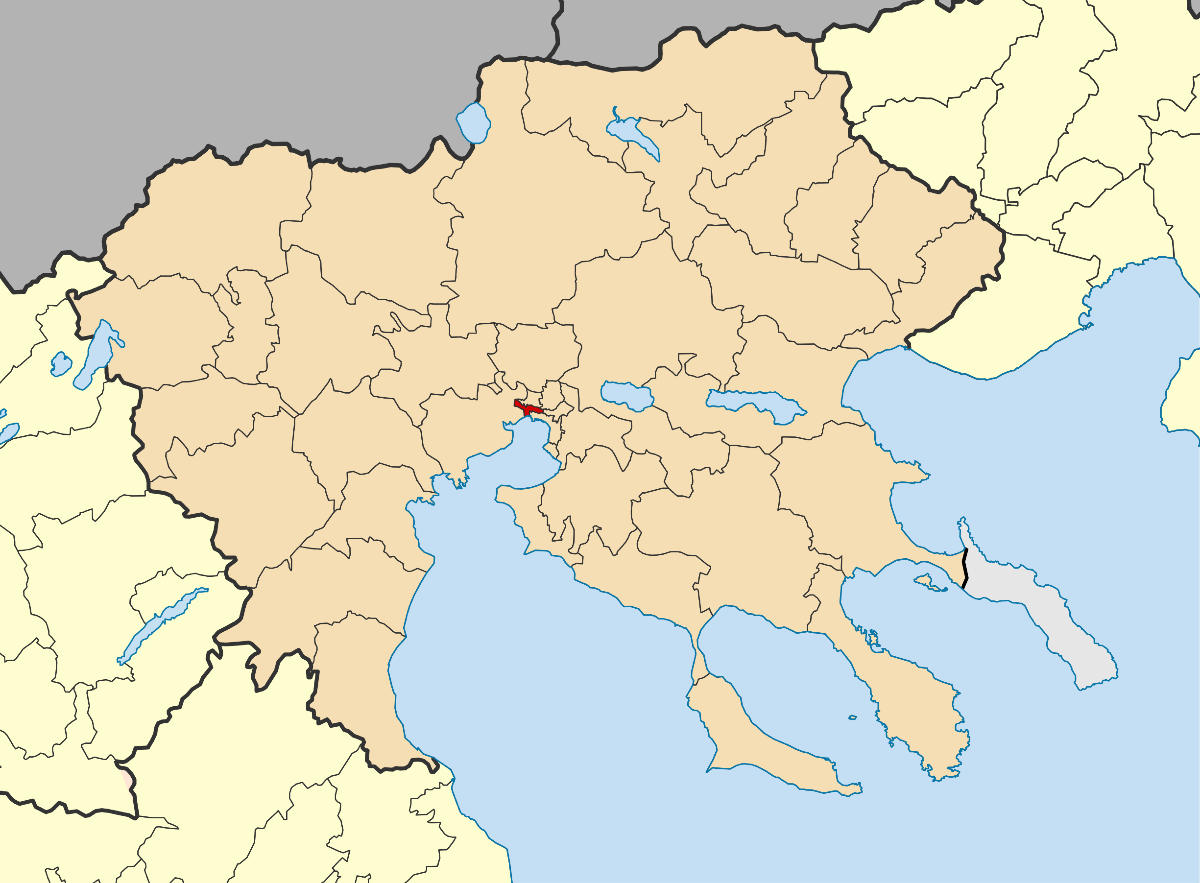

- Location within Greece
- Coordinates: 40°39′N 22°55′E
- Country: Greece
- Administrative region: Central Macedonia
- Regional unit: Thessaloniki
- Seat: Ampelokipoi

Government
  - Mayor: Lazaros Kyrizoglou (since 2011)

Area
  - Municipality: 8.82 km^{2} (3.41 sq mi)

Population (2021)
  - Municipality: 50,143
  - Density: 5,690/km^{2} (14,700/sq mi)
- Time zone: UTC+2 (EET)
  - Summer (DST): UTC+3 (EEST)
- Website: www.ampelokipi-menemeni.gr

Ampelokipoi–Menemeni (Greek: Αμπελόκηποι-Μενεμένη) is a municipality of the Thessaloniki Urban Area in the regional unit of Thessaloniki, Central Macedonia, Greece. The seat of the municipality is in Ampelokipoi.

== Municipality ==
The municipality Ampelokipoi–Menemeni was formed at the 2011 local government reform by the merger of the following 2 former municipalities, that became municipal units:

- Ampelokipoi
- Menemeni

== Population ==
Year	Population
2011	52,127
2021	50,143

== Neighborhoods ==
=== Municipal Unit of Ampelokipoi ===
- Eptalofos
- Akriton
- Kaistri
- Skeparni
- Filipou

=== Municipal Unit of Menemeni ===
- Nea Menemeni
- Vosporos
- Agios Nektarios

== Monuments ==
=== Municipal Unit of Ampelokipoi ===
- Monument of the Greeks of Asia Minor.
- Monument of the National Resistance (Eleftherias Street).
- Statue of the Mother of the People (Eptalofos Square).
- "Zeitenlik" WW1 Allied Cemetery and Museum of the French quarter of the cemetery.
- Monument of the last Byzantine Emperor, Constantine XI Palaiologos (Dimokratias Square).

=== Municipal Unit of Menemeni ===
- Monument of Chrysostomos of Smyrna and of the Asia Minor Catastrophe (Tsompanoglou Square).
- "Harmankioi" Allied Cemetery. It is an Indian Allied Cemetery which was used for the burial of Indians who were drafted by the British to support the Entente Powers during World War I.
