= Oenoe (Icaria) =

Ancient Greek settlement

Oenoe Οἰνόη
- Abandoned town
- Location within Greece
- Coordinates: 37.631°N 26.14537°E
- Country: Greece
- Region: North Aegean
- Regional unit: Ikaria

Oenoe or Oenoë or Oinoe (Ancient Greek: Οἰνόη) was a small town on the northwest coast of the island of Icaria. The name of the town seems to be derived from the wine grown in its neighbourhood on the slopes of Mount Pramnos, though others believe that the Icarian Oenoë was a colony of the Attic town of the same name. During the 6th century BC, Oenoe and the rest of Icaria became part of the sea empire of Polycrates, and during the 5th century BC, the Icarian cities of Oenoe and Thermae were members of the Athenian-dominated Delian League. During the 2nd century BC, the island was colonized by Samos. At this time, the Tauropolion, the temple of Artemis, was built at Oenoe. Coins of the city represented Artemis and a bull, with a legend "ΟΙ" or "ΟΙΝΑΙ[ΩΝ]".

Oenoe's site is located near Kampos, Evdilos.
