= Pefka =

Suburb of the Thessaloniki Urban Area, Greece

Pefka Πεύκα
- Municipal unit
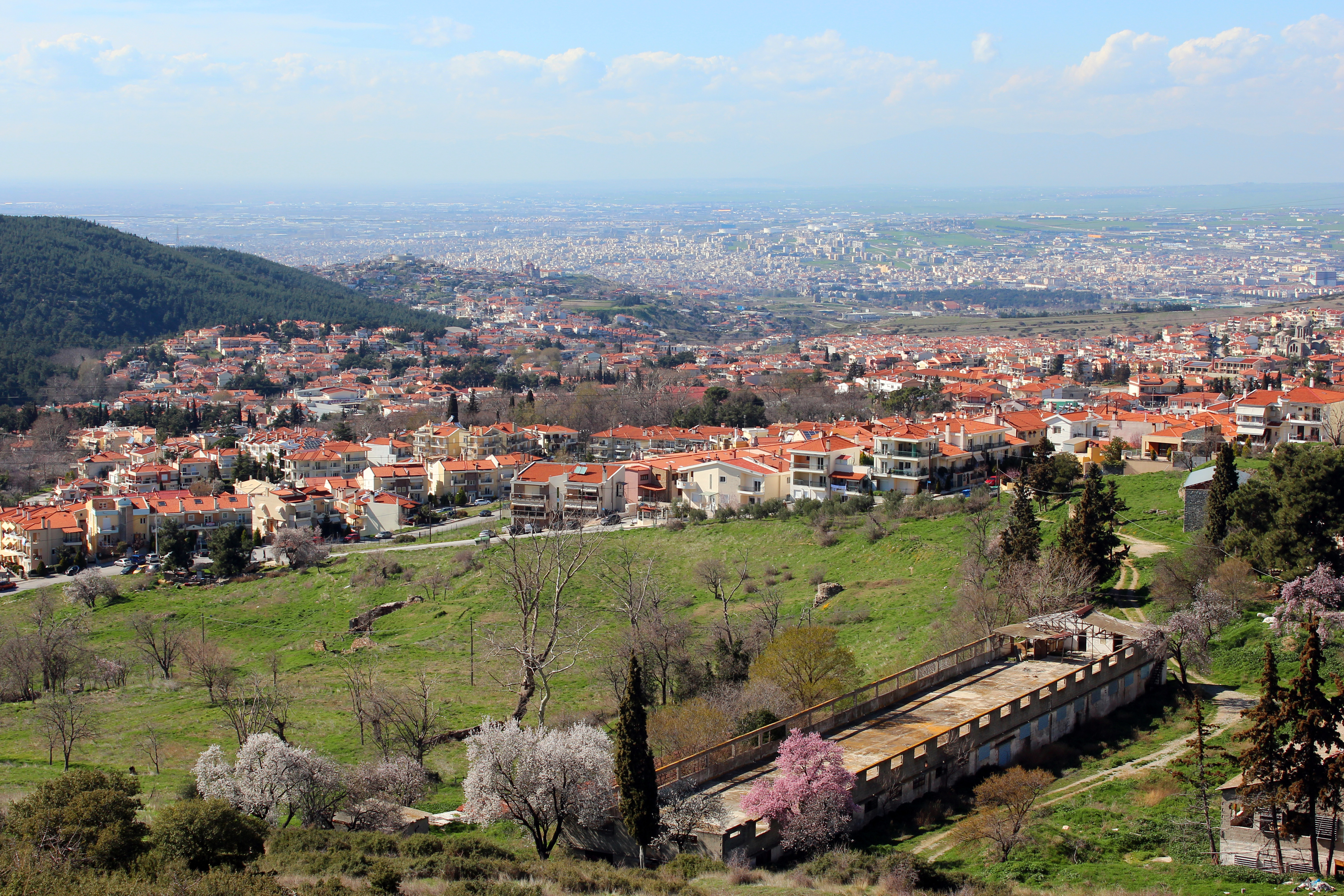
- View of Pefka with the Thessaloniki urban area in the background

- Location within the regional unit

- Location within Greece
- Coordinates: 40°39′N 22°59′E
- Country: Greece
- Geographic region: Macedonia
- Administrative region: Central Macedonia
- Regional unit: Thessaloniki
- Municipality: Neapoli-Sykies

Area
  - Municipal unit: 1.800 km^{2} (0.695 sq mi)

Population (2021)
  - Municipal unit: 13,435
  - Municipal unit density: 7,464/km^{2} (19,330/sq mi)
- Time zone: UTC+2 (EET)
  - Summer (DST): UTC+3 (EEST)

Pefka (Greek: Πεύκα), also known as Retziki (Ρετζίκι), is a suburb and a former municipality in the Thessaloniki regional unit of Macedonia, Greece. Since the 2011 local government reform it is part of the municipality Neapoli-Sykies, of which it is a municipal unit. It has a land area of 1.800 km^{2} and a population of 13,435 (2021).
