= Triandria =

Suburb of the Thessaloniki Urban Area, Greece

Triandria Τριανδρία
- Municipal unit
- Eleftherias street

- Location within the regional unit

- Location within Greece
- Coordinates: 40°37.4′N 22°58.2′E
- Country: Greece
- Geographic region: Macedonia
- Administrative region: Central Macedonia
- Regional unit: Thessaloniki
- Municipality: Thessaloniki

Area
  - Municipal unit: 1.475 km^{2} (0.570 sq mi)
- Elevation: 80 m (260 ft)

Population (2021)
  - Municipal unit: 9,428
  - Municipal unit density: 6,392/km^{2} (16,550/sq mi)
- Time zone: UTC+2 (EET)
  - Summer (DST): UTC+3 (EEST)
- Postal code: 553 37
- Area code: 2310
- Vehicle registration: Ν
- Website: www.triandria.gr

Triandria (Greek: Τριανδρία) is a suburb of the Thessaloniki Urban Area and was a former municipality in the regional unit of Thessaloniki, Macedonia, Greece. Since the 2011 local government reform it is part of the municipality Thessaloniki, of which it is a municipal unit. The municipal unit has an area of 1.475 km^{2}. It is located east of Thessaloniki's city centre at an average elevation of 80 m (260 ft). It borders on the Thessaloniki districts of Saranta Ekklisies to the northwest and of Ano Toumpa to the southeast. Motorway 25, which forms the eastern beltway of Thessaloniki, passes east of Triandria. The suburb (borough) is named after the World War I-era "Triumvirate of National Defence" (Τριανδρία της Εθνικής Αμύνης), comprising the statesman Eleftherios Venizelos, together with Admiral Pavlos Koundouriotis and General Panagiotis Danglis.

Triandria has four elementary schools, two gymnasiums and a lyceum. There is also a church of Saint Spyridon. The first church was housed in a stable in 1915 with the arrival of the first Asia Minor refugees. After the Asia Minor Catastrophe of 1922, a wooden Church of Saint Spyridon was built on the site of the old church (stable), as he is the protector saint of shoemakers, the job of most refugees in the area.

== Sports ==
- Achilleas Triandrias, football

== Historical population ==
Year	Population
1991	11,822
2001	11,289
2011	9,986
2021	9,428

== See also ==
- List of settlements in the Thessaloniki regional unit
