= Neapoli-Sykies =

Neapoli-Sykies Νεάπολη-Συκιές
- Municipality
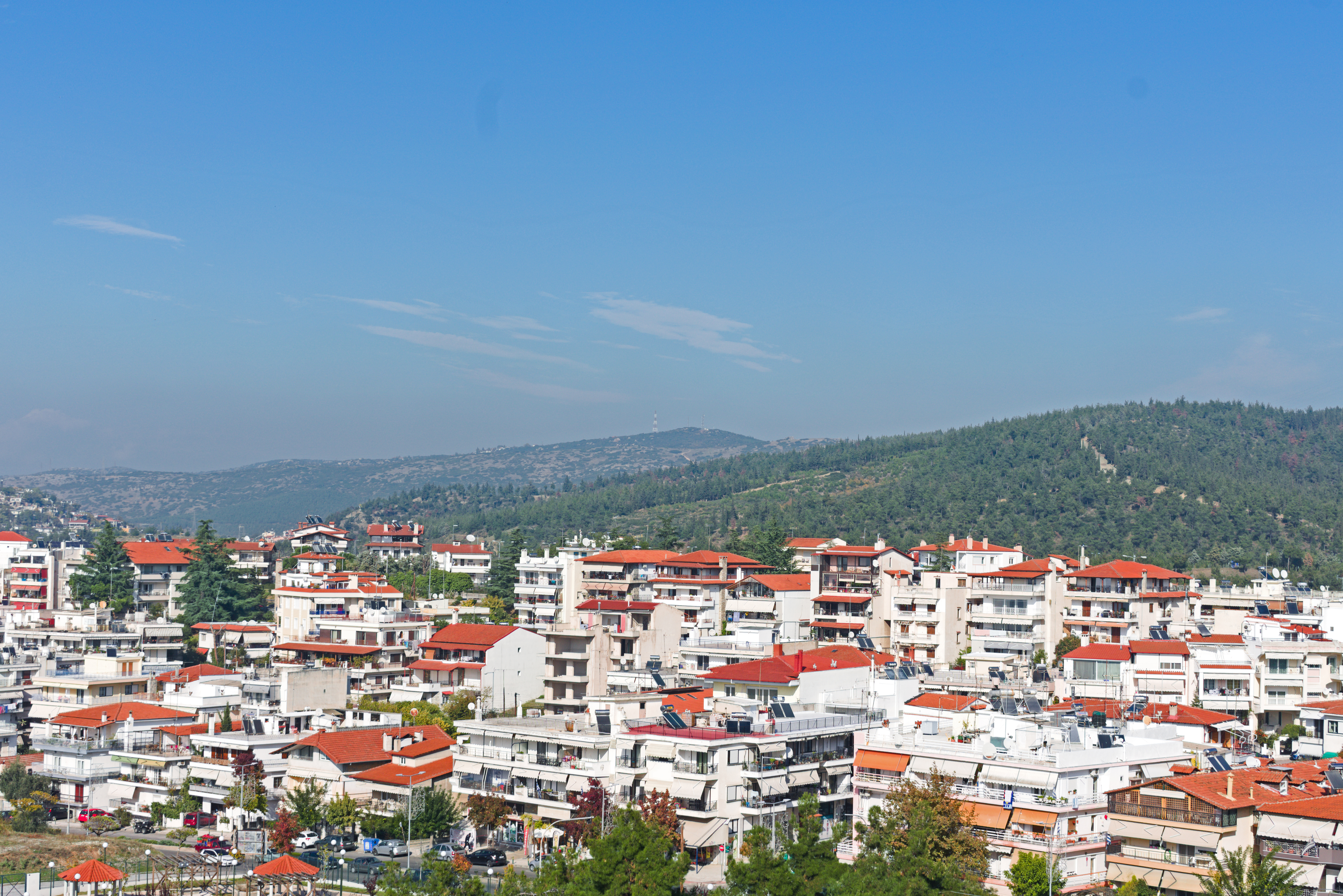
- Sykies seen from Heptapyrgion

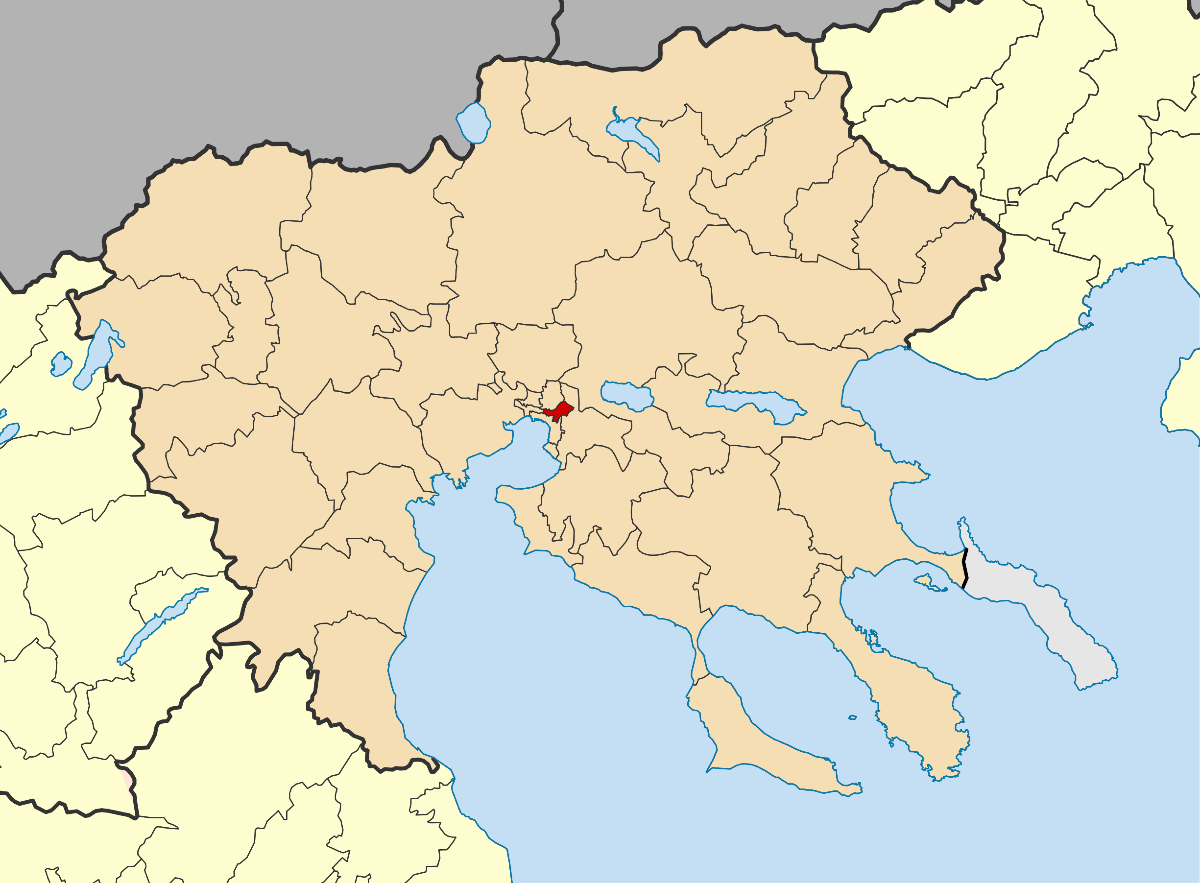

- Location within Greece
- Coordinates: 40°39′N 22°57′E
- Country: Greece
- Administrative region: Central Macedonia
- Regional unit: Thessaloniki
- Seat: Sykies

Government
  - Mayor: Simos Daniilidis (since 2011)

Area
  - Municipality: 12.90 km^{2} (4.98 sq mi)

Population (2021)
  - Municipality: 80,888
  - Density: 6,270/km^{2} (16,240/sq mi)
- Time zone: UTC+2 (EET)
  - Summer (DST): UTC+3 (EEST)
- Website: www.dimosneapolis-sykeon.gr

Neapoli–Sykies (Greek: Νεάπολη-Συκιές) is a municipality of the Thessaloniki Urban Area in the regional unit of Thessaloniki, Central Macedonia, Greece. The seat of the municipality is in Sykies. The municipality has an area of 12.903 km^{2}.

== Municipality ==
The municipality Neapoli–Sykies was formed at the 2011 local government reform by the merger of the following 4 former municipalities, that became municipal units:

- Agios Pavlos
- Neapoli
- Pefka
- Sykies
