= Oinoi, Kozani =

Oinoi Οινόη
- Community
- Location within Greece
- Coordinates: 40°19′12″N 21°54′50″E
- Country: Greece
- Administrative region: Western Macedonia
- Regional unit: Kozani
- Municipality: Kozani
- Municipal unit: Kozani

Population (2021)
  - Community: 67
- Time zone: UTC+2 (EET)
  - Summer (DST): UTC+3 (EEST)

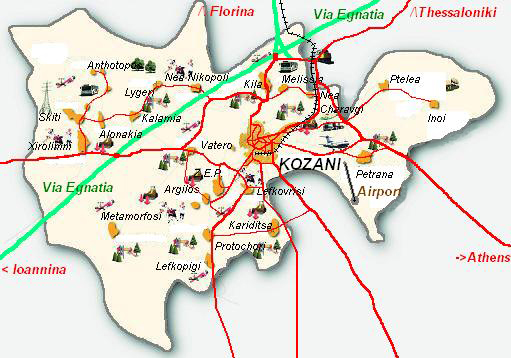
Location in Kozani

Oinoi (Greek: Οινόη) is a community of the city of Kozani in northern Greece. Located east of the city centre, it has a population of 67 (2021).
