= Ampelokipoi, Thessaloniki =

Suburb of the Thessaloniki Urban Area, Greece

Ampelokipoi Αμπελόκηποι
- Municipal unit
- Location within the regional unit

- Location within Greece
- Coordinates: 40°39′N 22°55′E
- Country: Greece
- Geographic region: Macedonia
- Administrative region: Central Macedonia
- Regional unit: Thessaloniki
- Municipality: Ampelokipoi-Menemeni

Area
  - Municipal unit: 1.803 km^{2} (0.696 sq mi)
- Elevation: 5 m (16 ft)

Population (2021)
  - Municipal unit: 35,846
  - Municipal unit density: 19,880/km^{2} (51,490/sq mi)
- Time zone: UTC+2 (EET)
  - Summer (DST): UTC+3 (EEST)
- Postal code: 561 21, 561 23
- Area code: +30231
- Vehicle registration: Ν
- Website: www.ampelokipoi.gr

Ampelokipoi (Greek: Αμπελόκηποι, meaning vineyards) is a suburb of the Thessaloniki Urban Area (not to be confused with the Athenian neighborhood-suburb with the same name and other areas throughout Greece) and a former municipality in the regional unit of Thessaloniki, Macedonia, Greece. Since the 2011 local government reform it is part of the municipality of Ampelokipoi-Menemeni, of which it is a municipal unit. The population was 35,846 in 2021, with a land area of 1.803 km². Ampelokipoi is the seat of the new Ampelokipoi-Menemeni municipality.

== Areas ==
Ampelokipoi include the areas of Heptalofos, Skeparni, Kaistri, Philippou and Akriton.

== Sport activities ==
The municipal sports club AO Ampelokipon has football, basketball, volleyball, swimming and athletic clubs. The local stadium was a training center for the Olympic Games of 2004.

== Other ==
In the area is located also the Zeitenlik WWI Allied cemetery, such as the Catholic cemetery of Saint Vincent.

== See also ==
- Zeitenlik
- Ampelokipoi, Athens
- https://en.wikipedia.org/w/index.php?title=Ampelokipoi,_Zakynthos&oldid=1253147846
