= Stavroupoli =

Suburb of Thessaloniki Urban Area, Greece

Stavroupoli Σταυρούπολη
- Municipal unit
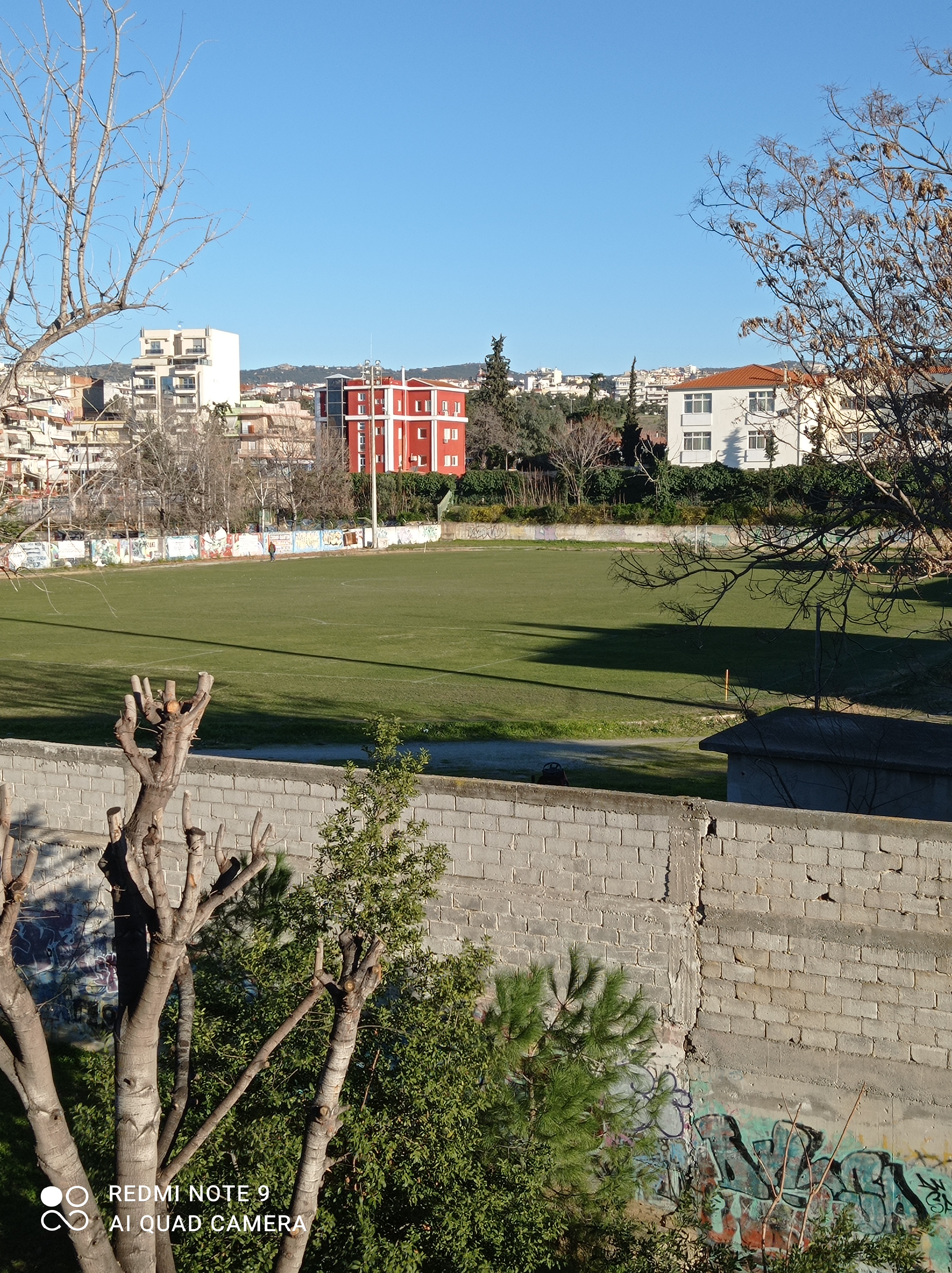
- View of Pavlos Melas football field and the town hall

- Location within the regional unit

- Location within Greece
- Coordinates: 40°40′N 22°56′E
- Country: Greece
- Geographic region: Macedonia
- Administrative region: Central Macedonia
- Regional unit: Thessaloniki
- Municipality: Pavlos Melas

Area
  - Municipal unit: 3.175 km^{2} (1.226 sq mi)

Population (2021)
  - Municipal unit: 45,891
  - Municipal unit density: 14,450/km^{2} (37,440/sq mi)
- Time zone: UTC+2 (EET)
  - Summer (DST): UTC+3 (EEST)
- Postal code: 564 xx
- Area code: 2310
- Vehicle registration: N
- Website: www.pavlosmelas.gr

Stavroupoli (Greek: Σταυρούπολη, literally city of the Cross) is a suburb of the Thessaloniki Urban Area and a former municipality in the regional unit of Thessaloniki, Greece. Since the 2011 local government reform it has been part of the Pavlos Melas Municipality, of which it is the seat and a municipal unit. The municipal unit has an area of 3.175 km^{2}. Stavroupoli is located northwest of Thessaloniki's city centre.

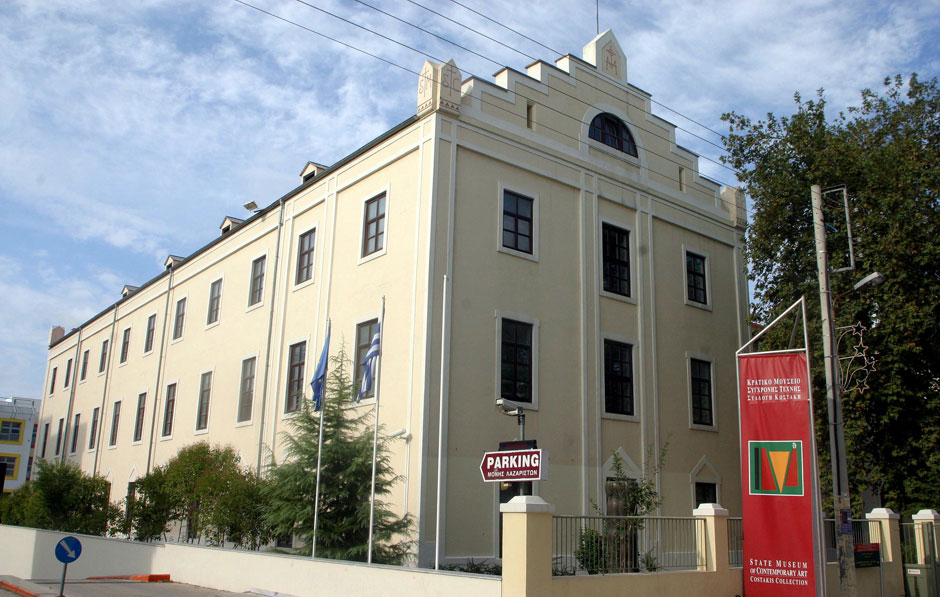
The Catholic Lazarist Monastery (Moni Lazariston)

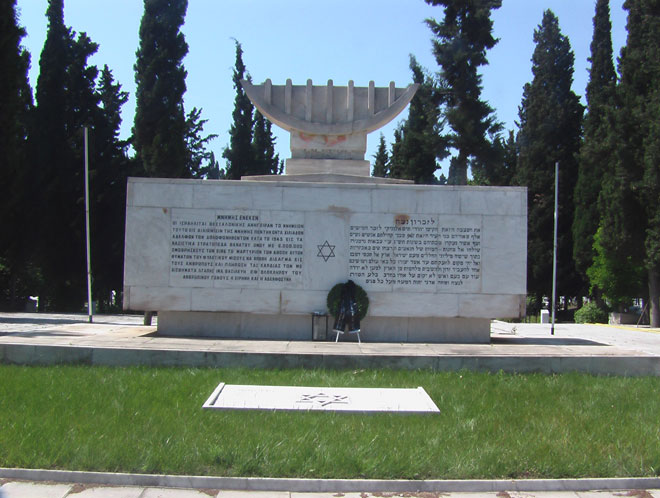
Holocaust memorial in the area of the new Jewish cemetery of the city

== Geography ==
The Stavroupoli region includes the areas of:

Τερψιθέα (Terpsithea)
Πρόνοια (Welfare)
Αμπελώνες (Vineyards)
Άνω Ηλιούπολη (Upper Ilioupoli)
Κάτω Ηλιούπολη (Lower Ilioupoli)
Νεόκτιστα (New City)
Άνωθεν Ασύλου (Upper Asylum)
Νικόπολη (Nikopoli)
Ομόνοια (Omonia)

The town is served by buses 27, 34 and 56.

The town hall is located at Karaoli & Dimitriou 1.

The area was also home to a military camp-converted-concentration camp during WWII, known in German as "Konzentrationslager Pavlo Mela" (Pavlos Melas Concentration Camp), where Jews, members of the Greek resistance and other anti-fascists were held either to be killed or sent to other concentration camps. Today the buildings are under restoration with a plan of construction of a museum.

== Historical population ==
Year	Population
1991	37,596
2001	41,653
2011	46,008
2021	45,891

== Notable people ==
- George Papassavas (1924), painter
