= Efkarpia =

Suburb of the Thessaloniki Urban Area, Greece

Efkarpia Ευκαρπία
- Municipal unit
- Dimokratias Square, Efkarpia

- Location within the regional unit

- Location within Greece
- Coordinates: 40°41′N 22°57′E
- Country: Greece
- Geographic region: Macedonia
- Administrative region: Central Macedonia
- Regional unit: Thessaloniki
- Municipality: Pavlos Melas

Area
  - Municipal unit: 13.263 km^{2} (5.121 sq mi)
- Elevation: 110 m (360 ft)

Population (2021)
  - Municipal unit: 15,416
  - Municipal unit density: 1,162.3/km^{2} (3,010.4/sq mi)
- Time zone: UTC+2 (EET)
  - Summer (DST): UTC+3 (EEST)
- Postal code: 56429
- Website: www.dimos-efkarpias.gr

Efkarpia (Greek: Ευκαρπία, romanized: Eukarpiá), also known as Nea Efkarpia (Greek: Νέα Ευκαρπία, lit. 'New Efkapria'), is a suburb of the Thessaloniki Urban Area and a former municipality in the regional unit of Thessaloniki, Macedonia, Greece. Since the 2011 local government reform it is part of the municipality Pavlos Melas, of which it is a municipal unit. It has a population of 15,416 (2021) and the area of the municipal unit is 13.263 km^{2}.

== History ==
Nea Efkarpia was established after the Greco-Turkish War of 1919–1922 by Greek refugees from Asia Minor and Pontus who settled there during the subsequent population exchange. It was named after Efkarpia in what is now the Uşak District of Turkey, with Nea translating to New in Greek. A considerable number of Aromanians also moved there from the villages of Megala Livadia and Kokkinopilos.
