= Sykies =

Suburb of the Thessaloniki Urban Area, Greece

Sykies Συκιές
- Municipal unit
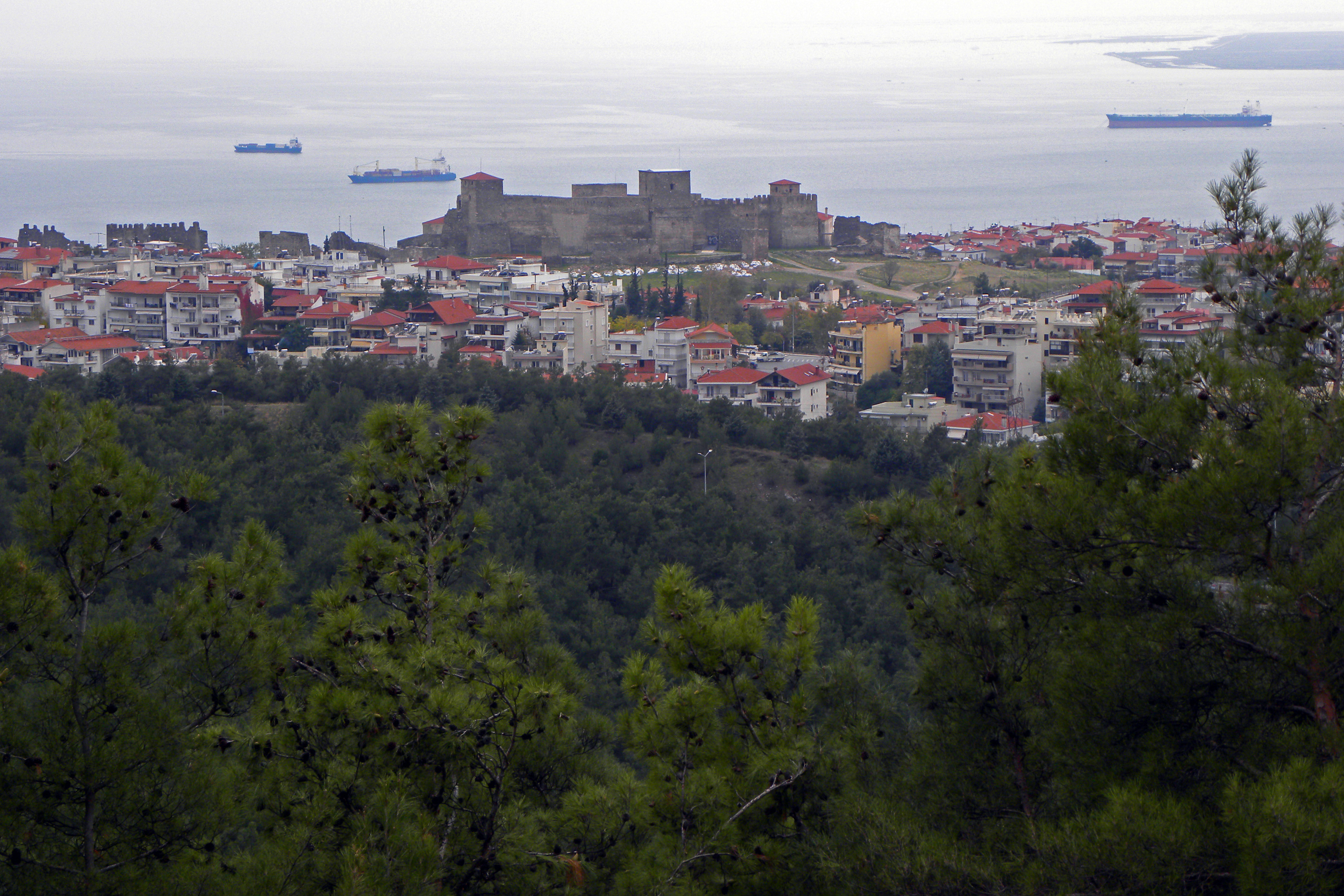
- View of Sykies district with Heptapyrgion

- Location within the regional unit

- Location within Greece
- Coordinates: 40°39′N 22°57′E
- Country: Greece
- Geographic region: Macedonia
- Administrative region: Central Macedonia
- Regional unit: Thessaloniki
- Municipality: Neapoli-Sykies

Area
  - Municipal unit: 7.982 km^{2} (3.082 sq mi)

Population (2021)
  - Municipal unit: 35,545
  - Municipal unit density: 4,453/km^{2} (11,530/sq mi)
- Time zone: UTC+2 (EET)
  - Summer (DST): UTC+3 (EEST)

Sykies (Greek: Συκιές) or Sykeai (Συκεαί) is a suburb of the Thessaloniki Urban Area and was a former municipality in the regional unit of Thessaloniki, Greece. Since the 2011 local government reform it is part of the municipality Neapoli-Sykies, of which it is the seat and a municipal unit. The municipal unit population is 35,545 (2021 census). Its land area is 7.982 km².

== History ==
Sykies was mostly built after settling of refugees from Asia Minor in 1922. The refugees were mostly from Rodochori of Asia Minor. The new residents built a new church that dedicated to patron saints from their origin places.

A part of the district is named Varna built by Greeks from Varna, modern Bulgaria. Other areas include Kallithea, Riga Feraiou and Heptapyrgiou.

In 1934 the municipality of Thessaloniki was divided in smallest administrative units, so Sykies became a separate community. In 1954 the community of Sykies changed to municipality. Today it is part of Neapoli-Sykies municipality.

== Culture ==
=== Sports ===
Sykies is the seat of many clubs. The most famous of them are Akrites Sykies and VAO, long-standing clubs with achievements in several sports.

Sport clubs based in Sykies
Club	Founded	Sports	Achievements
V.A.O.	1926	Basketball, Volleyball, Handball	Panhellenic title in handball, earlier presence in A1 Ethniki basketball
Akrites Sykies	1939	Football	Presence in Beta Ethniki Football
Phoebus Sykeon	1982	Handball	Presence in A1 Ethniki Handball
Panathlitikos Sykeon	1988	Basketball	Presence in A1 Ethniki women

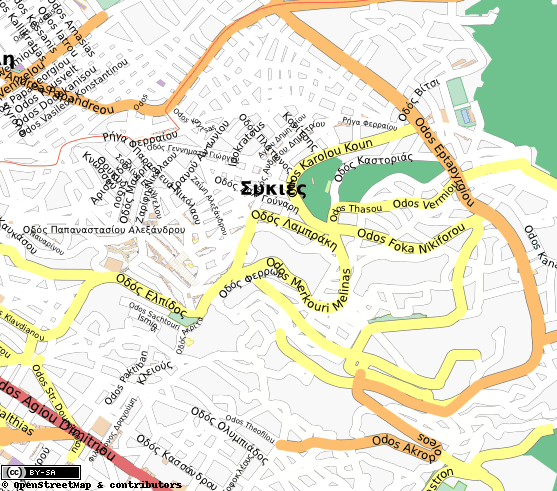
Part of the municipal unit of Sykies

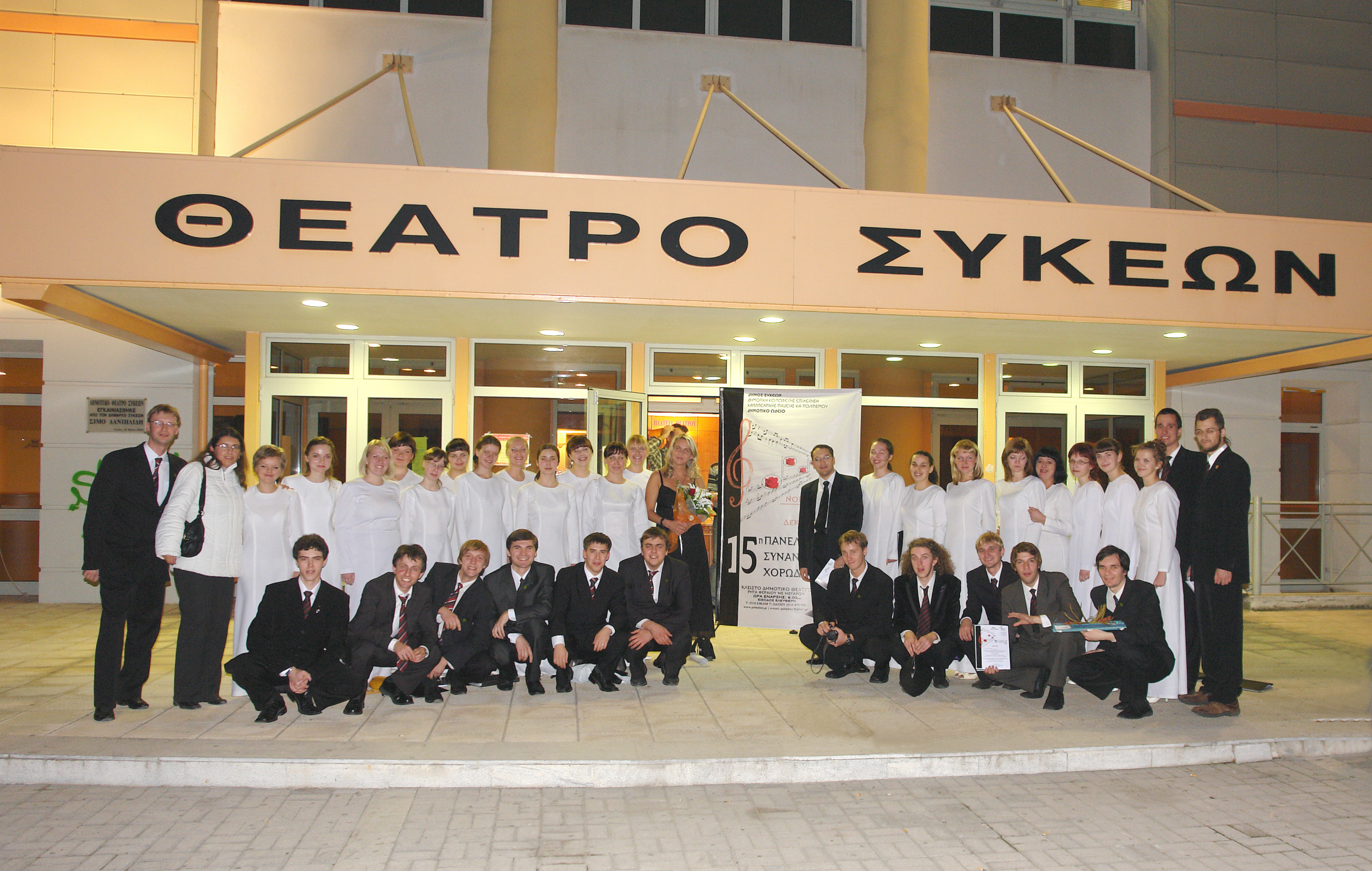
A choir at the Sykies Theatre
