= Panorama, Thessaloniki =

Suburb of the Thessaloniki Urban Area, Greece

Panorama Πανόραμα
- Municipal unit
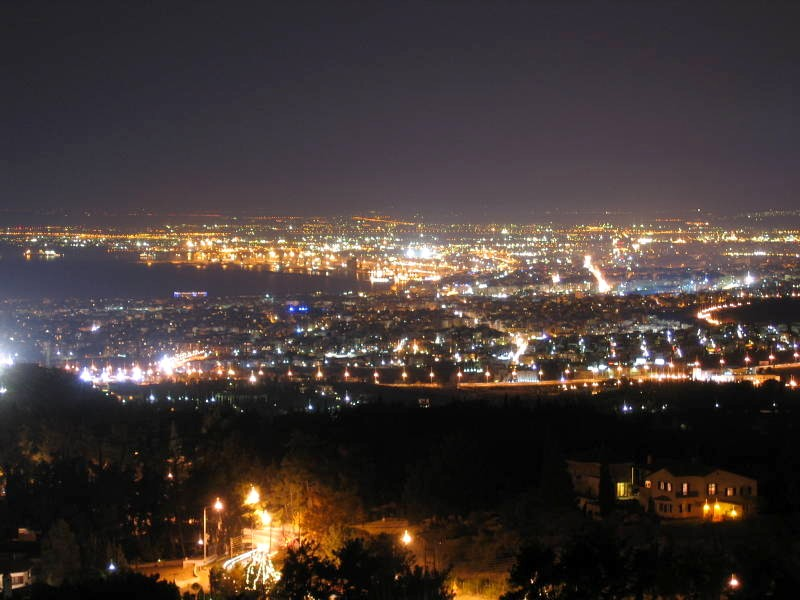
- Night view of central Thessaloniki from Panorama.

- Location within the regional unit

- Location within Greece
- Coordinates: 40°35′N 23°2′E
- Country: Greece
- Geographic region: Macedonia
- Administrative region: Central Macedonia
- Regional unit: Thessaloniki
- Municipality: Pylaia-Chortiatis

Area
  - Municipal unit: 21.321 km^{2} (8.232 sq mi)
- Elevation: 340 m (1,120 ft)

Population (2021)
  - Municipal unit: 17,679
  - Municipal unit density: 829.18/km^{2} (2,147.6/sq mi)
- Time zone: UTC+2 (EET)
  - Summer (DST): UTC+3 (EEST)
- Postal code: 552 xx
- Area code: 2310
- Vehicle registration: Ν

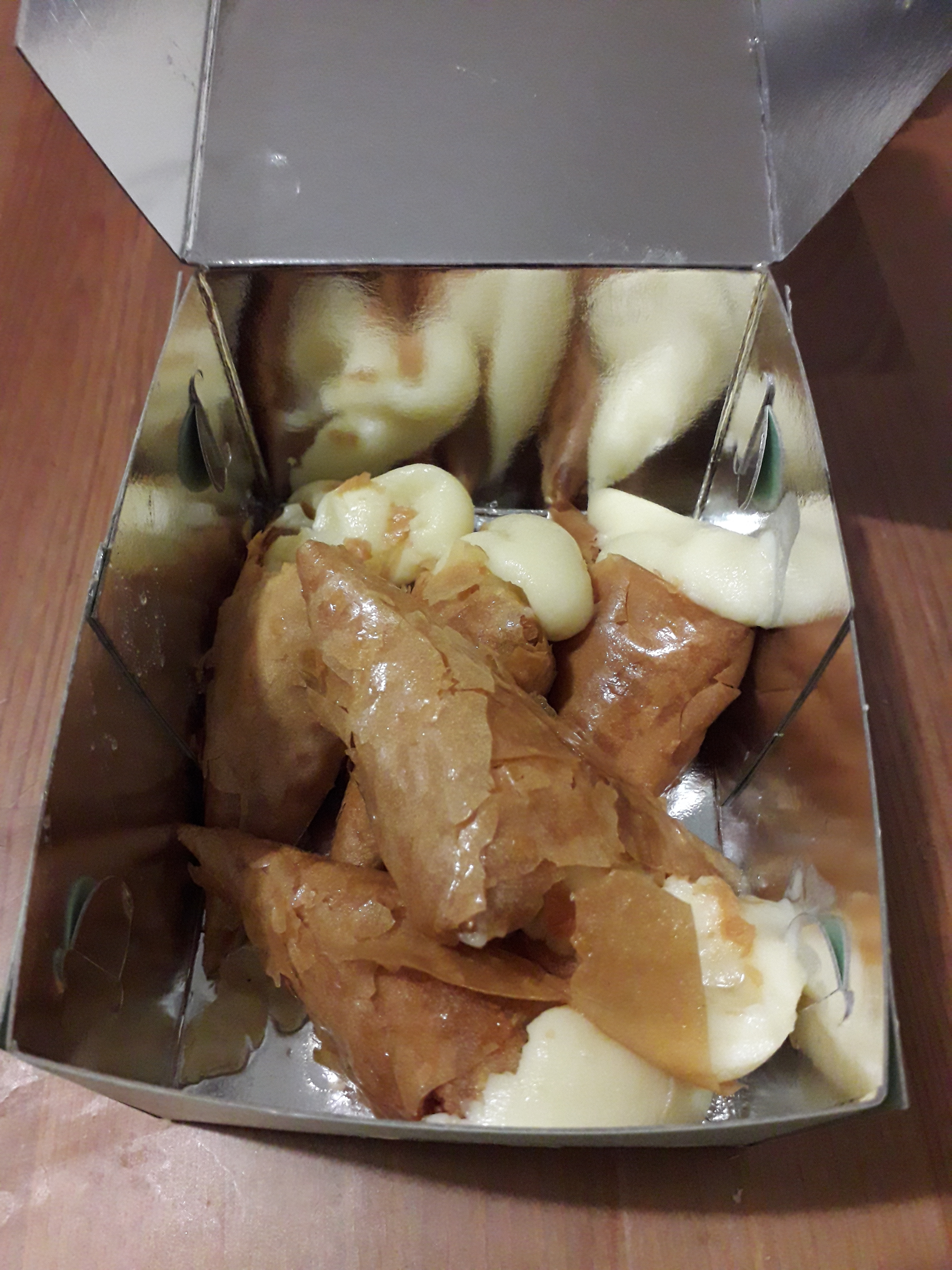
The Trigona Panoramatos dessert originated in Panorama

Panorama (Greek: Πανόραμα) is a suburb of Thessaloniki, in the Thessaloniki regional unit, Macedonia, Greece. Since the 2011 local government reform it is part of the municipality Pylaia-Chortiatis, of which it is the seat and a municipal unit. Panorama is located at the foot of Mount Chortiatis. The municipal unit has an area of 21.321 km^{2}.

== Historical population ==
Year	Population
1981	4,193
1991	10,278
2001	14,456
2011	17,444
2021	17,679

== See also ==
- List of settlements in the Thessaloniki regional unit
