= Polichni =

Suburb of the Thessaloniki Urban Area, Greece

Polichni Πολίχνη
- Municipal unit
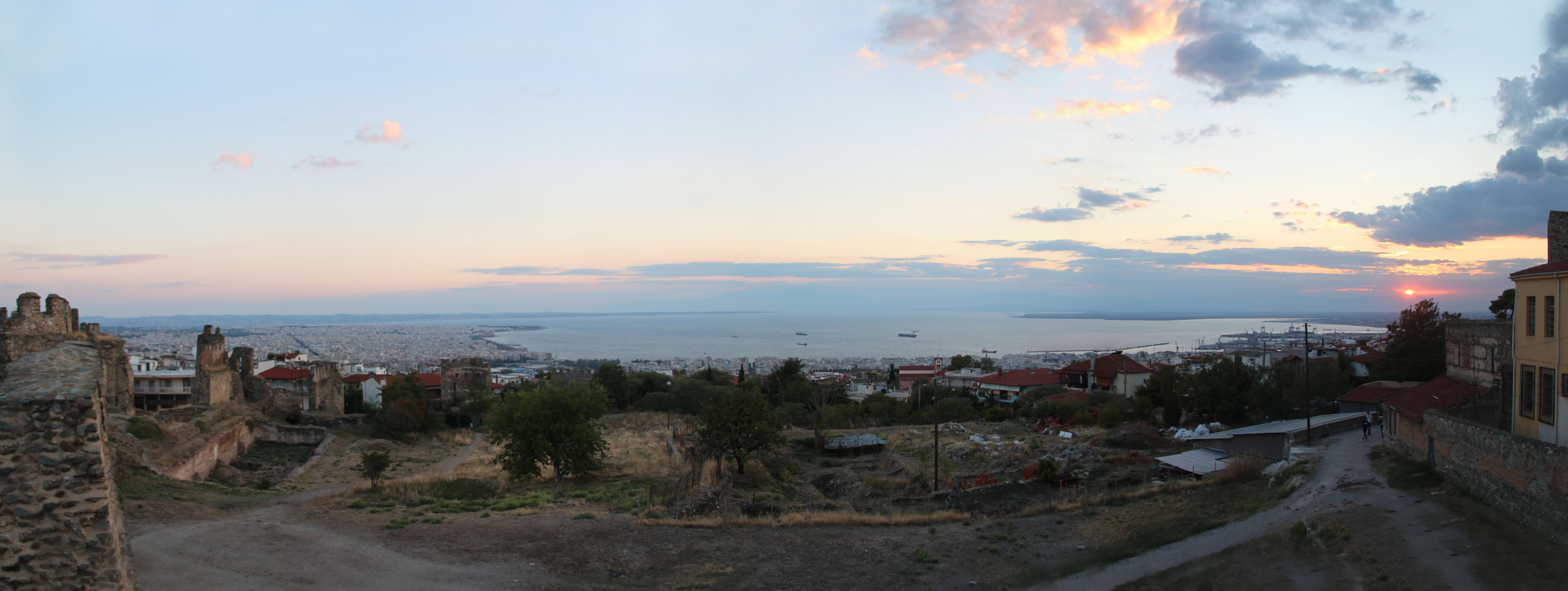
- View to Thessaloniki with Polichni in the foreground.

- Location within the regional unit

- Location within Greece
- Coordinates: 40°40′N 22°57′E
- Country: Greece
- Geographic region: Macedonia
- Administrative region: Central Macedonia
- Regional unit: Thessaloniki
- Municipality: Pavlos Melas

Area
  - Municipal unit: 7.325 km^{2} (2.828 sq mi)

Population (2021)
  - Municipal unit: 38,887
  - Municipal unit density: 5,309/km^{2} (13,750/sq mi)
- Time zone: UTC+2 (EET)
  - Summer (DST): UTC+3 (EEST)

Polichni (Greek: Πολίχνη, literally Little town) is a suburb of the Thessaloniki Urban Area and a former municipality in the regional unit of Thessaloniki, Macedonia, Greece. Since the 2011 local government reform, it is part of the municipality Pavlos Melas, of which it is a municipal unit. The population is 38,887 (2021 census), and it has a land area of 7.325 km^{2}.

The Polichni district includes the areas of:

Anthokipoi (Gardens)
Ano Polichni (Upper Polichni)
Meteora
Neromiloi (Water Mills)
St Panteleimon

The central square of Polichni is named after the Saint Panteleimon church.
