= Thessaloniki metropolitan area =

Metropolitan area in Greece

Coordinates: 40°38′N 22°57′E

Thessaloniki's urban and metropolitan areas as of 2011

The Thessaloniki metropolitan area or larger urban zone (LUZ) is the complete area covered and directly influenced by Thessaloniki. The metropolitan area traditionally consisted of the municipality of Thessaloniki and its immediate surroundings, which is today referred to as the Thessaloniki urban area. However, since the mid to late 1990s, the areas surrounding the urban area have succumbed to urban sprawl and what used to be agrarian communities are rapidly urbanizing and being developed into suburbs or exurbs. This is creating new problems for a region already facing issues such as pollution, traffic congestion and social ills.

Thessalonians usually refer to 6 municipalities and 1 municipal unit as the "City of Thessaloniki" (or the Thessaloniki urban area); this is the contiguous densely built-up urban area of the city. However, the metropolitan area also includes the city's immediate surroundings, adjacent zone of influence and its low to medium density suburbs that surround the densely built-up urban area.

Thessaloniki spreads over 30 kilometres (19 mi) from Oraiokastro in the north to Thermi in the south.

== Geography ==
The municipalities that have been historically associated with the Thessaloniki metropolitan area (and are part of the current Thessaloniki urban area), in descending order of population are Thessaloniki, Kalamaria, Neapoli-Sykies, Pavlos Melas, Kordelio-Evosmos, Ampelokipoi-Menemeni and the municipality of Pylaia.

However, with urban sprawl, more municipalities are being interconnected with the growing region. The region now consists of all the traditional areas noted above as well as the newly emerging suburbs and exurbs to the northwest, north, east and southeast of the city. Also, the industrial areas to the west are becoming more interwoven with the fabric of the city as new infrastructure encroaches on these areas.

Two old suburbs that are increasingly coalescing into the Thessaloniki urban area, due to its expansion and the creation of new transportation networks, are those of Oraiokastro and Panorama. While Oraiokastro has traditionally been a middle-class suburb, Panorama has been a more upscale suburb and is considered the city's most exclusive.

The main eastern and southeastern suburbs include the municipal units of Thermaikos, Thermi, Chortiatis, Mikra, Michaniona, Vasilika and Epanomi; while the main western suburbs include the municipal units of Echedoros and Chalastra.

== Demographics ==
The municipalities to the west of Thessaloniki are increasingly becoming home to new immigrants and are predominantly working class areas. The newly emerging suburbs to the east are where the vast majority of the middle class residents are moving to. Many of these suburbs are seeing rapid growth and development and infrastructure is not keeping pace.

=== Population ===
By far the largest municipality in the metropolitan area is the municipality of Thessaloniki (the city center).

A census carried out by Eurostat in 2004 has revealed an increased population for the metropolitan area or Larger Urban Zone (LUZ) of Thessaloniki of an estimated 995,766 residents (2004), while calculating its real area to be 1,455.62 square kilometres (562.02 sq mi). The 2011 Greek census revealed that Thessaloniki's metropolitan area has a population slightly larger than 1.000.000 residents.

The table below, which features population data from the 2021 census, lists the municipalities/suburbs of the Thessaloniki metropolitan area, among those of the city's urban area indicated in italics. Compared to the previous census in 2011, there is a slight decrease of 6,185 inhabitants, or approximately -0.61% population change.

Table source: National Statistical Service of Greece

| Municipality | Population (2021) | Area in km^{2} |
|---|---|---|
| Thessaloniki | 319,045 | 19.292 |
| Kordelio-Evosmos | 105,352 | 13.358 |
| Pavlos Melas | 100,194 | 23.763 |
| Kalamaria | 92,248 | 6.401 |
| Neapoli-Sykies | 80,888 | 12.903 |
| Pylaia-Chortiatis | 72,384 | 155.634 |
| Thermi | 55,358 | 382.106 |
| Ampelokipoi-Menemeni | 50,143 | 9.792 |
| Thermaikos | 45,561 | 133.410 |
| Delta | 44,935 | 311.094 |
| Oraiokastro | 40,004 | 217.855 |
| Metropolitan area | 1,006,112 | 1,285.608 |

== Growth issues ==
A serious problem that the suburbs of the Thessaloniki metropolitan area in particular have faced, was the lack of extending and introducing new growth boundaries on time (particularly in the southeast) by the national government, to manage the rapid suburban growth and urban sprawl that started in the 1990s. This allowed many new homes to be built on large blocks of land with no future urban provisions taken into consideration and in areas that were otherwise used for agriculture.

Floor area ratios (FAR) are recommended by the national government to manage growth and have been used to deter landowners from building homes outside the growth boundaries (city/town zones) of each suburb. It is common practice to violate the FARs by building structures that are larger than recommended, with many suburban homes being in direct violation of Greek planning laws. Only recently have actions been taken by the Hellenic government to extend the growth boundaries, allowing the creation of new and much needed urban layouts and addressing current issues by introducing new planning laws. However, the actual implementation of such actions for each municipality is usually expected to be complete in five years time, from the time that the government had announced it.
