= Greek refugees =

Greek natives in the Ottoman Empire who were forced to leave

Greek refugees is a collective term used to refer to the more than one million Greek Orthodox natives of Asia Minor, Thrace and the Black Sea areas who fled during the Greek genocide (1914–1923) and Greece's later defeat in the Greco-Turkish War (1919–1922), as well as remaining Greek Orthodox inhabitants of Turkey who were required to leave their homes for Greece shortly thereafter as part of the population exchange between Greece and Turkey, which formalized the population transfer and barred the return of the refugees. This Convention Concerning the Exchange of Greek and Turkish Populations was signed in Lausanne, on January 30, 1923 as part of the peace treaty between Greece and Turkey and required all remaining Orthodox Christians in Turkey, regardless of what language they spoke, be relocated to Greece with the exception of those in Istanbul and two nearby islands. Although the term has been used in various times to refer to fleeing populations of Greek descent (primarily after the Ionian Revolt, the Fall of Constantinople or the Greek Civil War), the population strength and the influence of the Asia Minor Greeks in Greece itself, has attached the term to the Anatolian Greek population of the early 20th century. At least 300,000 Greek refugees were from Eastern Thrace, whereas at least 900,000 were from Asia Minor. At least 150,000 were from Istanbul, who left the city in three years before 1928.

== Terminology ==
The Orthodox Christian refugees from Asia Minor are usually called in Greek simply Οι Πρόσφυγες (Oi Prosfyges, The Refugees). Alternative terms used are Οι Μικρασιάτες πρόσφυγες (Oi Mikrasiates prosfyges, The Asia Minor refugees) or Οι πρόσφυγες του '22 (Oi prosfyges tou '22, The refugees of 1922). Further distinctions are made to denote the refugees from various historic regions of Anatolia: Πόντιοι πρόσφυγες (Pontioi prosfyges, Pontic refugees) from the Black Sea coast, Καππαδόκες πρόσφυγες (Kappadokes prosfyges, Cappadocian refugees) from central Turkey, Μικρασιάτες πρόσφυγες (Mikrasiates prosfyges, The refugees from Asia Minor), to refer to the Greeks from the geographic area of the peninsula; special reference is made for the Refugees from Smyrna (Oi prosfyges tis Smyrnis, Πρόσφυγες της Σμύρνης), since Smyrna was then the second largest Turkish city, and many of the affected Greeks lived there. The refugees from Eastern Thrace are also included.

== Historical background ==
=== Antiquity ===
The eastern coast of the Aegean was inhabited by Greeks as early as the 9th century BC. Aeolian, Ionian and Dorian colonies were established from the Dardanelles to Caria, with the most important being Miletus, Phocaea, Ephesus and Smyrna. The prominence of the Ionians gave to the region the name Ionia. The Greeks of Asia Minor contributed significantly in the ancient Greek history, from the Ionian Revolt, the Ionian League and the conquests of Alexander the Great, to the Hellenistic kingdoms of Pergamos and Pontus. The Ionians were the first Greek-speaking people that the Persians encountered, and the Persian name for Greece became Younan or Yunan (یونان), derived from the word "Ionia." The name spread throughout the Near East and Central Asia.

Following the spread of the Hellenistic civilization in the 3rd century BC, Greek became the lingua franca of Asia Minor, and by the fifth century AD, when the last of the Indo-European native languages of Anatolia ceased to be spoken, Greek became the sole spoken language of the natives of Asia Minor.

=== Byzantine Empire ===
After the founding of Constantinople by the first Christian Roman Emperor Constantine the Great in 330, Asia Minor, the major part of the Greek East, became the most important region of the Eastern Roman (Byzantine) Empire. For the centuries to follow, the area was the main manpower and wheat source of the state. Numerous invasions and epidemics (especially the Plague of Justinian) devastated the area in various times. However, Asia Minor remained densely populated, compared to the rest of the Medieval world and held the bulk of the empire's Greek speaking orthodox Christian population. Thus, many renowned Greek-speaking figures who lived during this time were Asia Minor Greeks, including Saint Nicholas (270-343), John Chrysostomos (349-407), Isidore of Miletus (6th century), and Basilios Bessarion (1403-1472). The Greek speaking Christian population began to decline with the invasions of the Muslim Seljuq Turks in the 11th century. The establishment of the Seljuk Empire deprived the Byzantines of a large part of Asia Minor. The Fall of Constantinople on May 29, 1453, and the subsequent fall in 1461 of the Greek Empire of Trebizond, located along the eastern Black Sea coast, marked the end of Greek sovereignty in Asia Minor.

=== Ottoman Empire ===
The first centuries of the Ottoman rule were named The Dark centuries by the Greeks. The custom of the Janissaries and the various restrictions on the religious, economic and social lives of the non-Muslim inhabitants of the Empire constituted an imminent danger for the continuation of the Greek inhabitation of Asia Minor. Conditions were improved over the following centuries, but the Greeks remained in the lower caste status of Dhimmi. Islamization and gradual Turkification continued. The ideas of The Enlightenment and the subsequent Greek War of Independence, raised the hopes of the Asia Minor Greeks for sovereignty. Many Greeks from Anatolia fought as revolutionaries and faced the retaliations of the Sultan.

=== 20th century ===
The persecutions, massacres, expulsions, and death marches of the Asia Minor Greeks were renewed during the early 20th century by the Young Turk administration of the Ottoman Empire and during the subsequent revolution of Mustafa Kemal Atatürk. The Ottoman Greek population was severely affected; its misfortunes became known as the Greek Genocide. After the defeat of the Ottoman Empire during World War I, the Allies granted Greece, with the Treaty of Sèvres, the administration of Eastern Thrace (apart from Constantinople) and the city of Smyrna and its environs. The Pontic Greeks attempted to establish their own republic, the Republic of Pontus. The defeat of the Greek army during the Greco-Turkish War led to what became known in Greece as the Asia Minor Catastrophe. A series of events, with the Great Fire of Smyrna been their peak, ended the 3,000-year-old Greek presence in Asia Minor. The Treaty of Lausanne, which was signed in 1923, anticipated the compulsory exchange of populations. The remaining Greek Orthodox population of Asia Minor and Eastern Thrace, as well as the Muslim population of Greece (the Greeks of Constantinople, Imbros and Tenedos and the Muslims of Western Thrace were excluded) were denaturalized from homelands of centuries or millennia.

== Population strength ==
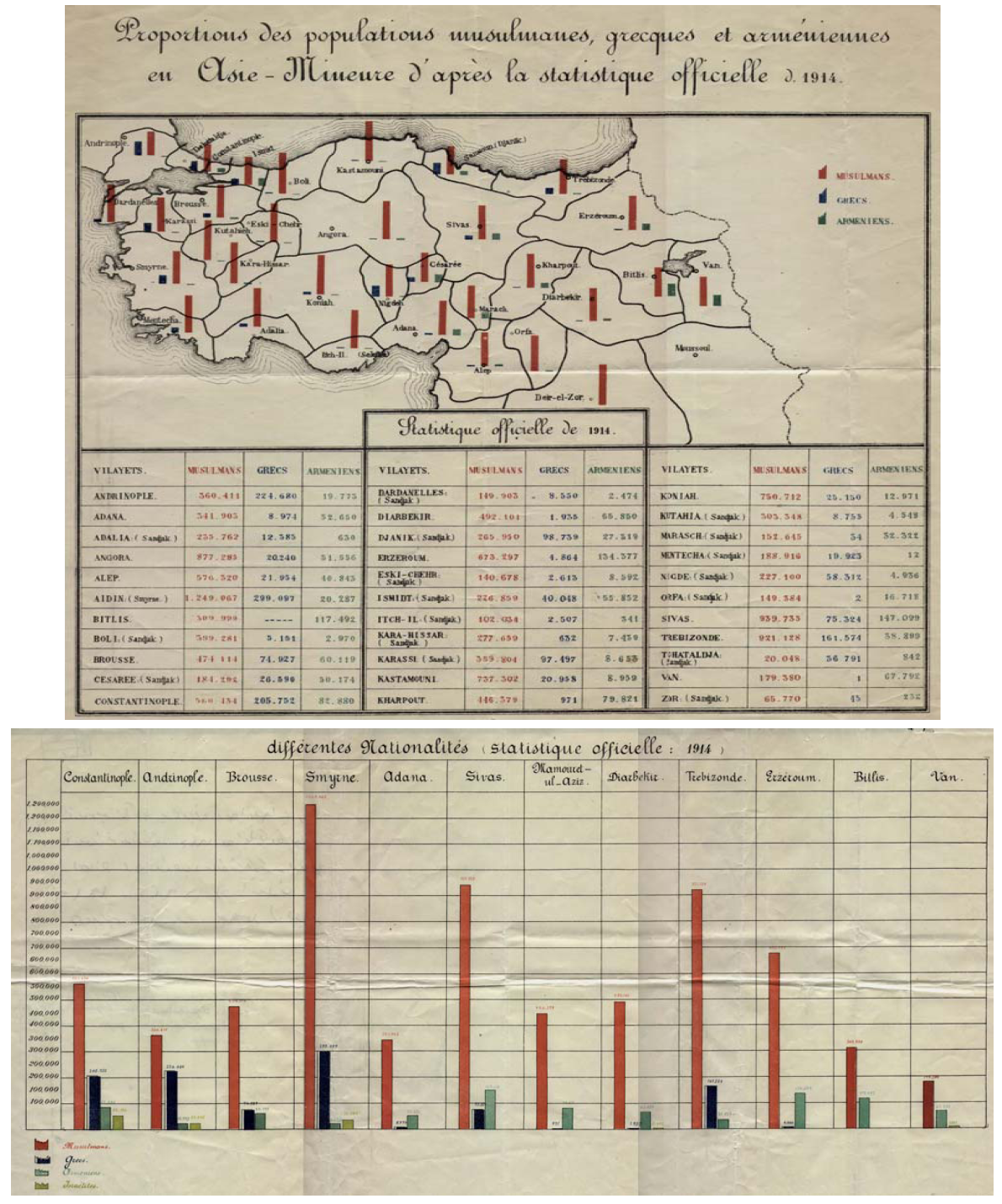
The archive document of 1914 Census of the Ottoman Empire. Total population (sum of all millets) was 20,975,345 and the Greek population before the Balkan Wars were 2,833,370 (1909 census) was dropped to 1,792,206 (due to loss of lands to Greece) in 1914 census; published also by Stanford J. Shaw.

1914 Ottoman census, which followed the 1909 census, showed a steep decrease of the Greek population by almost 1 million between these years due to loss of lands (with their population) to Greece after the Balkan Wars. The argument that Greeks constituted the majority of the population of Anatolia claimed by Greece during Greco-Turkish War (1919–1922) has been contested by a number of historians. In their book about the British foreign policy of World War I and post war years, Cedric James Lowe and Michael L. Dockrill argued that: Greek claims were at best debatable, [they were] perhaps a bare majority, more likely a large minority in the Smyrna Vilayet, which lay in an overwhelmingly Turkish Anatolia. The estimations of the Ecumenical Patriarchate, the Greek state and various Western sources, place their number much higher. The number of Greeks excluded from the population exchange was about 300,000 (270,000 living in Istanbul). There are not exact figures of the refugee population in Greece.

The first national Greek census after 1923, conducted in 1928, showed the number of the Greeks of Asia Minor origin to be 1,164,267. Some refugees had moved to Russia and the Middle East in previous years. Approximately 250,000 Greek Americans of Asia Minor descent had emigrated to the United States between 1866 and 1917, had American citizenship, and thereby would not become refugees; they would, however, be deprived from their property rights in their ancestral homeland, as well as from their right to return. It is usually estimated that the refugees in Greece numbered approximately 1.5 million people. Descendants of the refugees took part in the great Greek migrations of the Interwar period, as well as the large immigrations to the United States, Australia and Germany in the 1960s and 1970s.

== Areas of settlement ==
The core of the refugee population settled in Attica and Macedonia. The official refugee population per region in 1928 was as follows (number of refugees and percent of the refugee population):

Macedonia: 638,253 52.2% (with 270,000 in Thessaloniki alone)
Central Greece and Attica: 306,193 25.1%
Thrace: 107,607 8.8%
North Aegean islands: 56,613 4.6%
Thessaly: 34,659 2.8%
Crete: 33,900 2.8%
Peloponnese: 28,362 2.3%
Epirus: 8,179 0.7%
Cyclades: 4,782 0.4%
Ionian Islands: 3,301 0.3%
Total: 1,221,849 100%

Numerous suburbs, towns and villages were established to house the additional population of Greece, which rose by about 1/3 in just a few months. These areas are often named Nea (New) followed by the name of the Greek-speaking town or city in Asia Minor that its residents came from. In addition, to this day many towns in Greece have a quarter named Προσφυγικά, The Refugees' (quarter). These new settlements were usually named after the place of origin of their inhabitants:

=== List of settlements ===
This is a list of refugee settlements in Greece (the place of origin is in parentheses)

- Thrace

Orestiada, Evros (Adrianople)

- Macedonia

Drama*, (Pontus and Asia Minor)
Kavala*, (Pontus and Asia Minor)
Xanthi*, (Pontus and Asia Minor)
Pontoiraklia (Serres), (Heraclea Pontica, Pontus)
Neokaisareia, Pieria (Neocaesarea, Pontus)
Nea Karvali, Kavala (Cappadocia)
Nea Moudania, Chalcidice (Apamea Myrlea)
Nea Triglia, Chalcidice (Triglia)
Nea Santa, Kilkis (Pontus)
Loutrochori, Pella (Pontus)
Kalamaria, Thessaloniki (Pontus)
Mandres, Kilkis (Mandritsa)
Menemeni, Thessaloniki (Mainemeni)
Nea Madytos, Thessaloniki (Madytus, Gallipoli)
Nea Michaniona, Thessaloniki (Pontus)
Nea Magnesia, Thessaloniki (Manisa)
Nea Filadelfeia, Thessaloniki (Philadelphia)
Nea Krini, Thessaloniki (Krini)
Vamvakoussa, Serres (Kidia, Bursa Asia Minor)
Toumba, Thessaloniki (Pontus and Asia Minor)
Saranta Ekklisies, Thessaloniki (Saranta Ekklisies)
Eleftherio-Kordelio, Thessaloniki (Kordelio)
Chalkidona, Thessaloniki (Chalcedon)
Nea Kallikrateia, Halkidiki (Kallikrateia)
Nea Mpafra, Serres (Bafra)

- Epirus

Nea Kerasous, Preveza (Kerasous)
Nea Sampsous, Preveza (Sampsous)
Nea Sinopi, Preveza (Sinopi)
Anatoli, Ioannina (Asia Minor)

- Thessaly

Nea Ionia, Magnesia (Ionia)
Mandra, Larissa (Misthi, Cappadocia)
Amygdalea, Larissa (Cappadocia)

- Central Greece

Nea Sinasos, Euboea (Sinassos)
Nea Artaki, Euboea (Artaki)

- Peloponnese

Nea Kios, Argolis (Cius)
Patras*, Achaia

- Crete

Nea Alikarnassos, Heraklion (Halicarnassus)

- Attica

Kallithea (Pontus)
Argyroupolis (Pontus)
Drapetsona (Pontus)
Sourmena (Pontus)
Nea Chalkidona (Chalcedon)
Nea Erythraia (Krini)
Nea Filadelfeia (Philadelphia)
Nea Peramos (Karşıyaka near Peramos)
Nea Smyrni (Smyrna)
Kesariani (Ionia)
Vironas (Ionia)
Imittos (Ionia)
Nea Fokaia (Phocaea)
Nikaia (Asia Minor), (Pontus)
Keratsini (Asia Minor)
Nea Ionia (Pisidia, Cilicia, Isparta, Cappadocia)
Paleo Faliro (Constantinople)
Nea Makri (Makri, now Fethiye)
Pefki (Ionia)
Saframpolis, Nea Ionia (Safranbolu)
Inepolis, Nea Ionia (Inebolu)
Nea Aeolis, Dionysos, (Pergamos, Aeolis)

* denotes settlement that pre-existed, but acquired a large number or refugees

== Positive effects ==
The arrival of the Asia Minor Greeks resulted in the rise of the agricultural production of the state by 400%. The arable land increased by 55%. The Nikolaos Plastiras Government decided on February 14, 1923 to further divide the arable land of Greece, in order for the refugees and their descendants to be the owners of their own land. The income tax revenues of the Greek state rose by about 400%, or five-fold, within four years, mainly thanks to the refugees (from 319 million drachmas in 1923, to 1.137 billion in 1927).

Greece managed to increase the homogeneity of the population, especially in Northern Greece (Macedonia and Thrace). The urban population increased greatly, resulting in the creation of the modern Greek metropolises of Athens and Thessaloniki. New liberal ideas arrived along with the refugees, especially those coming from the cosmopolitan city of Smyrna. The influence of the refugees was particularly important in the cultural field.

The Greek trade and the exchange rates pushed the Greek economy into a new era of industrialization and development, partly due to the arrival of thousands of cheap hands, manpower of low cost. New industries were established in short time by the skilled refugee population (e.g. carpet industries). In addition, many of them became later successful ship-owners (e.g. Aristotle Onassis).

The Asia Minor Greeks became an inspiration for the native Greek population during the Interwar period, and fought along with their compatriots in World War II, as well, as they had an active role in the Greek Resistance.

== Negative effects ==
The Greek Orthodox population of Anatolia constituted one of the wealthiest groups of the former Ottoman Empire. They controlled a lot of the economic life and the trade of Anatolia. Their expulsion led to the abandonment of many factories and shops in the hands of the newly established Republic of Turkey. According to the Treaty of Lausanne, both states had the obligation to make reparations of the properties of the exchanged populations, an obligation that was never fulfilled, at the expense mostly of the Greek Orthodox refugees (whose number was larger and wealthier than the agricultural Muslim population of Greece).

The demographic changes of the Anatolian Christian population were severe, as well as the changes in the demography of Greece herself, where thousands of people died of diseases. The diseases had also an impact on the native population of the country. Apart from malaria, which caused the death of tens of thousands, diseases that had not appeared in Greece for years (cholera, plague) increased the already high mortality rates.

The problem of the housing of the refugees was the most pressing. Within the first ten days of October 1922, 50,000 Greeks mainly from Kydonies/Ayvali arrived in Lesbos, creating a huge humanitarian problem. During the years 1923–1928, the Greek state built 25,000 houses for the refugees. The Institute for the Relief of the Refugees (ΕΑΠ, EAP) built another 27,000 houses (11,000 only in Attica). The same institute spent an estimated 2,422,961 English pounds in order to house 165,000 refugees in Athens and Thessaloniki.

== Impact on the Greek psyche ==
The Asia Minor Expedition and Catastrophe, as well as the uprooting of the ethnic Greek population from Anatolia after three thousand years of presence, had an enormous impact on the Greek psyche. The Smyrna Catastrophe has been considered as the worst incident of modern Greek history, and as an incident of the same magnitude as the Fall of Constantinople. The matters related to the refugees halted the Greco-Turkish relations for many decades. The issues concerning the missing Greeks were soon raised in the International Red Cross, without any success and cooperation from the Turkish side. To this day, the Greek citizens who were born in Asia Minor have to apply for a visa in order to enter Turkey (something that does not apply to Greek citizens born in Greece).

The descendants of the refugees have founded hundreds of organizations and institutes in Greece and in the diaspora to promote their civilization and to keep in touch with their roots. Various museums in Greece (such as the Benaki Museum) display artifacts from Asia Minor, Pontus, Cappadocia and Eastern Thrace to denote the Greek presence and emphasize the origins of about 40% of the population of modern Greece.

== Nobel Peace Prize nominations ==
For its efforts concerning the relief of the refugees The Greek Red Cross (Croix-Rouge Hellénique) was nominated a total of 19 times from 1923 to 1930 for the Nobel Peace Prize; 16 times in 1923, 2 in 1924 and 1 in 1930. The Nobel Peace Prize was not awarded in 1923 and 1924.

== In popular culture ==
- The Greek refugees and their tragedy was depicted in the Closing ceremony of the 2004 Olympic Games in Athens.
- Various successful Greek singers have sung songs about the refugees and the Asia Minor Catastrophe (mainly Alkistis Protopsalti, Haris Alexiou, George Dalaras, Eleftheria Arvanitaki, Nikos Xilouris, Glykeria).
- The refugees have been the main theme of many Greek movies, since the 1920s, and especially during the Golden Age of the Greek cinema in the 1960s and 1970s. Two well known movies include 1922 and Smyrna, My Beloved.
- The film America, America by the renowned Cappadocian Greek-American director Elia Kazan presents the harsh situation and the uprooting of Asia Minor Greeks in the years preceding World War I.

== See also ==
- Constantinople pogroms
- Outline of Greek genocide
- List of massacres in Turkey
- Cyprus problem
