= Varieties of Modern Greek =

Dialects and differences between the written standard and spoken speech

The linguistic varieties of Modern Greek can be classified along two principal dimensions. First, there is a long tradition of sociolectal variation between the natural, popular spoken language on the one hand and archaizing, learned written forms on the other. Second, there is regional variation between dialects. The competition between the popular and the learned registers (see Diglossia) culminated in the struggle between Dimotiki and Katharevousa during the 19th and 20th centuries. As for regional dialects, variation within the bulk of dialects of present-day Greece is not particularly strong, except for a number of outlying, highly divergent dialects spoken by isolated communities.

== Diglossia ==
=== Roots and history: Demotic and Katharevousa ===
Ever since the times of Koiné Greek in Hellenistic and Roman antiquity, there was a competition between the naturally evolving spoken forms of Greek on the one hand, and the use of artificially archaic, learned registers on the other. The learned registers employed grammatical and lexical forms in imitation of classical Attic Greek (Atticism). This situation is known in modern linguistics as diglossia.

During the Middle Ages, Greek writing varied along a continuum between extreme forms of the high register very close to Attic, and moderate forms much closer to the spoken Demotic. According to Manolis Triantafyllides, the modern Greek language of the beginning of the 19th century, as used in the demotic poetry of the time, has very few grammatical differences from the vernacular language of the 15th century. During the early Modern Era, a middle-ground variety of moderately archaic written standard Greek emerged in the usage of educated Greeks (such as the Phanariots) and the Greek church; its syntax was essentially Modern Greek. After the Greek War of Independence and the formation of the modern Greek state (1830), a political effort was made to "purify" this form of Greek by bringing it back to resemble classical Attic Greek more closely. The result was Katharevousa (καθαρεύουσα, lit. 'the purifying one'), still a compromise form with basically Modern Greek syntax, but re-lexified with a much larger amount of Ancient Greek words and morphology. Katharevousa was used as an official language in administration, education, the church, journalism, and (until the late 19th century) in literature.

At the same time, spoken Demotic, while not recognised as an official language, nevertheless developed a supra-regional, de facto standard variety. From the late 19th century onwards, written Demotic rather than Katharevousa became the primary medium of literature. During much of the 20th century, there were heated political conflicts over the use of either of the two varieties, especially over the issue of their use in education. Schools were forced to switch from one form to the other and back several times during the 20th century. The conflict was resolved only after the overthrow of the Greek military junta of 1967–1974, whose strong ideological pro-Katharevousa stance had ultimately contributed to bringing that language form into disrepute. In 1976, shortly after the restoration of democracy, Demotic was finally adopted for use everywhere in education and became the language of the state for all official purposes. By that time, however, the form of Demotic used in practice was no longer the pure popular dialect, but had begun to assimilate elements from the Katharevousa tradition again. In 1982 diacritics were replaced by the monotonic orthography.

=== Standard Modern Greek ===
Modern linguistics has come to call the resulting variety "Standard Modern Greek" to distinguish it from the pure original Demotic of earlier literature and traditional vernacular speech. Greek authors sometimes use the term "Modern Greek Koiné" (Greek: Νεοελληνική Κοινή, romanized: Neoellinikí Koiní, lit. 'Common Modern Greek'), reviving the term koiné that otherwise refers to the "common" form of post-classical Ancient Greek; according to these scholars, Modern Greek Koiné is the "supra-dialect product of the composition of both the Demotic and Katharevousa." Indeed, Standard Modern Greek has incorporated a large amount of vocabulary from the learned tradition, especially through the registers of academic discourse, politics, technology and religion; together with these, it has incorporated a number of morphological features associated with their inflectional paradigms, as well as some phonological features not originally found in pure Demotic.

== History of modern Greek dialects ==
The first systematic scholarly treatment of the modern Greek dialects took place after the middle of the 19th century, mainly thanks to the work of the prominent Greek linguist Georgios Hadjidakis. The absence of descriptive accounts of the speech of individual regions made the efforts of the researchers of the 19th century more difficult. Therefore, the dialects' forms are known to us only during their last phase (from the middle of the 19th century, and until the panhellenic dominance of the Standard Modern Greek).

=== Initial dialect differentiation ===
Modern linguistics is not in accord with the tendency of the 19th century scholars to regard modern Greek dialects as the direct descendants of the dialects of ancient Greek. According to the latest findings of scholarship, modern Greek dialects are products of the dialect differentiation of Koiné Greek, and, with the exception of Tsakonian and possibly Italiot Greek, they have little correlation with the ancient dialects.

It is difficult to monitor the evolution of Koiné Greek and its splitting into the modern Greek dialects; certain researchers make the hypothesis that the various local varieties were formed between the 10th and the 12th century (as part of an evolution starting a few centuries before), but it is difficult to draw some safer conclusions because of the absence of texts written in the vernacular language, when this initial dialect differentiation occurred. Very few paradigms of these local varieties are found in certain texts, which used mainly learned registers. The first texts written in modern Greek dialects appear during the Early Renaissance on the islands of Cyprus and Crete.

=== Historical literary dialects ===
Before the establishment of a common written standard of Demotic Greek, there were various approaches to using regional variants of Demotic as a written language. Dialect is recorded in areas outside Byzantine control, first in legal and administrative documents, and then in poetry. The earliest evidence for literary dialects comes from areas under Latin control, notably from Cyprus, Crete, and the Aegean islands. From Cyprus under the Lusignan dynasty (the 14th to 16th centuries), legal documents, prose chronicles, and a group of anonymous love poems have survived. Dialect archives also survive from 15th century Naxos.

It is above all from the island of Crete, during the period of Venetian rule from 1204 until its capture by the Ottomans in 1669, that dialect can be illustrated more fully. Documents showing dialectal features exist from the end of the 12th century, rapidly increasing in number from the 13th century onward. During the Cretan Renaissance in the 16th and early 17th centuries there existed a flourishing vernacular literature in the Cretan dialect, based on Italian literary influences. Its best-known specimen today is the verse romance Erotokritos, by Vitsentzos Kornaros (1553–1614).

Later, during the 18th and early 19th centuries, the Ionian Islands, then also under Italian rule, became a centre of literary production in Demotic Greek. The best-known writer from that period was the poet Dionysios Solomos (1789–1857), who wrote the Greek national anthem (Hymn to Liberty) and other works celebrating the Greek Revolution of 1821–1830. His language became influential on the further course of standardisation that led to the emergence of the modern standard form of Demotic, based on the south-western dialects.

== Modern varieties ==
Spoken modern vernacular Greek can be divided into various geographical varieties. There are a small number of highly divergent, outlying varieties spoken by relatively isolated communities, and a broader range of mainstream dialects less divergent from each other and from Standard Modern Greek, which cover most of the linguistic area of present-day Greece and Cyprus. Native Greek scholarship traditionally distinguishes between "dialects" proper (διάλεκτος), i.e. strongly marked, distinctive varieties, and mere "idioms" (ιδίωμα), less markedly distinguished sub-varieties of a language. In this sense, the term "dialect" is often reserved to only the main outlying forms listed in the next section (Tsakonian, Pontic, Cappadocian and Italiot), whereas the bulk of the mainstream spoken varieties of present-day Greece are classified as "idioms". However, most English-speaking linguists tend to refer to them as "dialects", emphasising degrees of variation only when necessary. The geographical varieties of Greek are divided into three main groups, Northern, Semi-Northern and Southern, based on whether they make synizesis and vowel elision:

Examples of modern Northern Greek dialects are:

- Rumelian,
- Epirote (except Thesprotia prefecture),
- Thessalian,
- Macedonian,
- Thracian.

The Southern category is divided into groups that include variety groups from:

- Megara, Aegina, Athens, Kymi (Old Athenian) and Mani Peninsula (Maniot)
- Peloponnese (except Mani), Cyclades, Crete and Ionian Islands
- Dodecanese and Cyprus.
- Parts of southern Albania (known as Northern Epirus among Greeks).
- Asia Minor (Modern Turkey)

=== Outlying varieties ===
==== Tsakonian ====
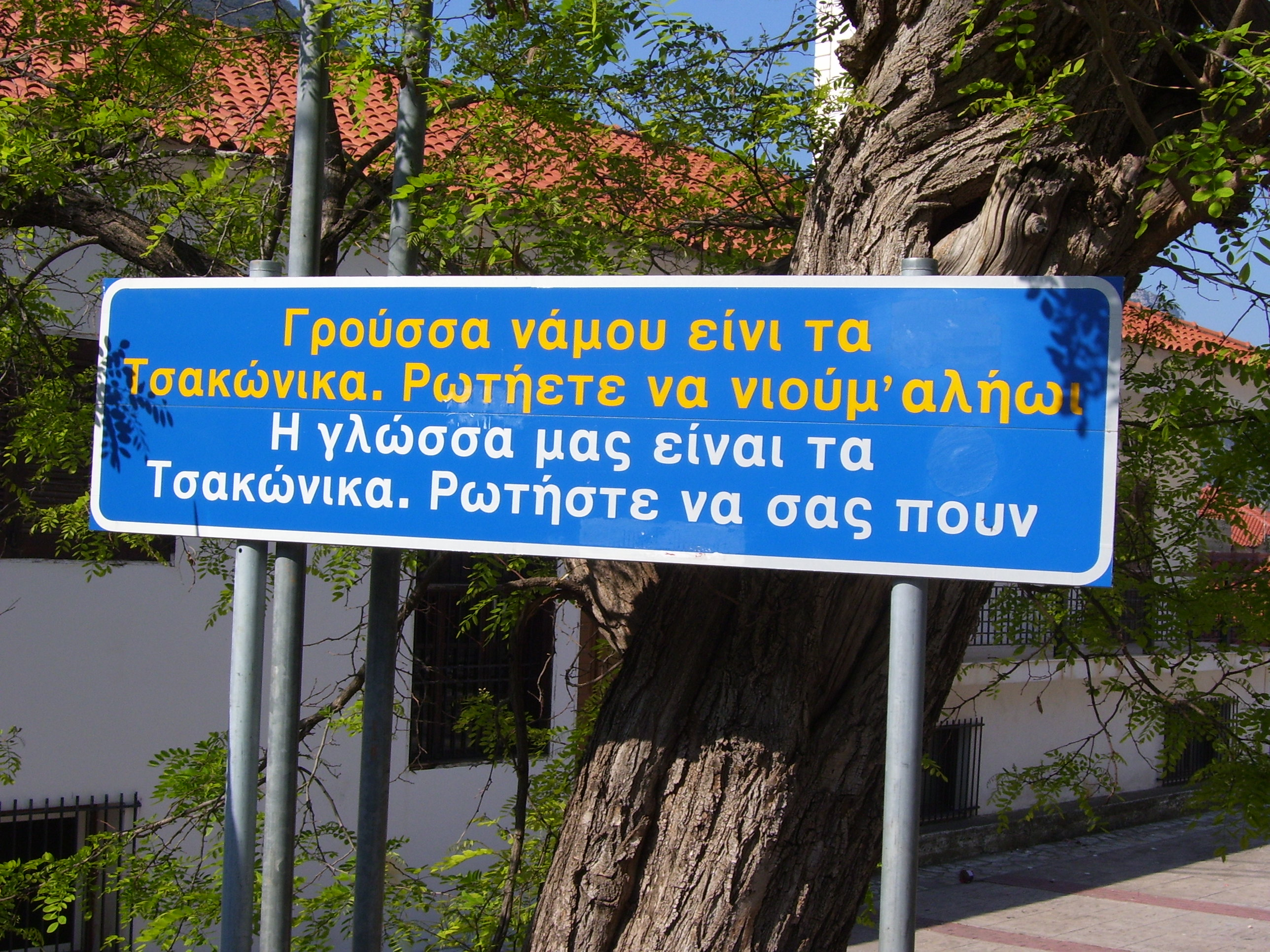
(Tsakonian/Greek) "Our language is Tsakonian. Ask and they'll tell you". Greek sign in the town of Leonidio.

Tsakonian Greek is a highly divergent variety, sometimes classified as a separate language because it is not intelligible to speakers of standard Greek. It is spoken in a small mountainous area slightly inland from the east coast of the Peloponnese peninsula. It is unique among all other modern varieties in that it is thought to derive not from the ancient Attic–Ionian Koiné, but from Doric or from a mixed form of a late, ancient Laconian variety of the Koiné influenced by Doric. It used to be spoken earlier in a wider area of the Peloponnese, including Laconia, the historical home of the Doric Spartans.

==== Pontic Greek ====
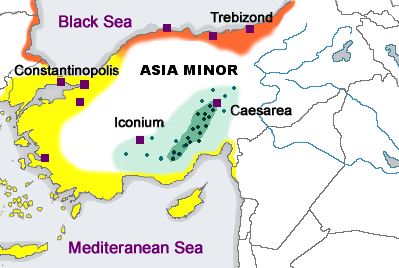
Anatolian Greek until 1923. Demotic in yellow. Pontic in orange. Cappadocian, Pharasiot and Silliot Greek are in green. Green dots indicate non-Pontic-speaking villages in 1910.

Pontic Greek varieties are those originally spoken along the eastern Black Sea coast of Asia Minor, the historical region of Pontus in Turkey. From there, speakers of Pontic migrated to other areas along the Black Sea coast, in Ukraine (see Mariupol), Russia and Georgia. Through the forced population exchange after the Greco-Turkish War (1919–1922) and the Treaty of Lausanne of 1923, the Pontic speakers of Turkey were expelled and moved to Greece. Of the Pontic speakers in the ex-Soviet Union, many have immigrated to Greece more recently. The number of Pontic Greeks currently maintaining the dialect is unclear. A small group of Muslim Pontic speakers remain in Turkey, although their varieties show heavy structural convergence towards Turkish.

==== Cappadocian Greek ====
Other varieties of Anatolian Greek that were influenced by the Turkish language, besides Pontic, are now almost extinct, but were widely spoken until 1923 in central Turkey, and especially in Cappadocia. In 1923, all Orthodox Christian inhabitants of Asia Minor were forced to emigrate to Greece after the Greek genocide (1919–1921) during the Population exchange between Greece and Turkey. In 2005, professors Mark Janse and Dimitris Papazachariou discovered that there are still native speakers of the Mistiot dialect of Cappadocian in Central and Northern Greece. Cappadocian Greek diverged from the other Byzantine Greek varieties earlier, beginning with the Turkish conquests of central Anatolia in the 11th and 12th centuries, and so developed several radical features, such as the loss of the gender for nouns. Having been isolated from the crusader conquests (Fourth Crusade) and the later Venetian influence of the Greek coast, it retained the Ancient Greek terms for many words that were replaced with Romance ones in Demotic Greek. The poet Rumi, whose name means "Roman", referring to his residence amongst the "Roman" Greek speakers of Cappadocia, wrote a few poems in Cappadocian Greek, leaving one of the earliest attestations of the dialect.

==== Pharasiot Greek ====
The Greek dialect spoken in Pharasa (Faraşa, now Çamlıca village in Yahyalı, Kayseri) and other nearby villages (Afshar-Köy, Çukuri), to the east of Cappadocia, is not particularly close to Cappadocian. It may be closer to Pontic, or equally distant from both. The Pharasiot priest Theodoridis published some folk texts. In 2018, Metin Bağrıaçık published a thesis on Pharasiot Greek, based on speakers remaining in Greece.

==== Silliot Greek ====
The Greek dialect of Sille (near Iconium/Konya) was the most divergent of the varieties of Asia Minor Greek.

==== Italiot Greek ====
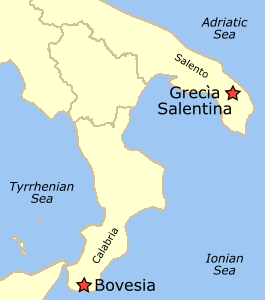
Location map of the Griko-speaking areas in Salento and Calabria

Griko or Italiot Greek is the group of Greek varieties spoken in some areas of southern Italy, a historical remnant of the ancient colonisation of Magna Graecia. There are two small Griko-speaking communities known as the Griko people who live in the Italian regions of Calabria, the southern tip of the Italian peninsula, and in Apulia, its south-easternmost corner. These varieties too are believed to have developed on the basis of an originally Doric ancient dialect, and have preserved some elements of it, though to a lesser extent than Tsakonian. They subsequently adopted influences from ancient Koiné, but became isolated from the rest of the Greek-speaking world after the decline of Byzantine rule in Italy during the Middle Ages. Among their linguistic peculiarities, besides influences from Italian, is the preservation of the infinitive, which was lost in the modern Greek of the Balkans.

==== Mariupolitan ====
Rumeíka (Ρωμαίικα) or Mariupolitan Greek is a dialect spoken in about 17 villages around the northern coast of the Sea of Azov in southern Ukraine. Mariupolitan Greek is closely related to Pontic Greek and evolved from the dialect of Greek spoken in the Crimea, which was a part of the Pontic Empire of Trebizond until that state fell to the Ottomans in 1461. Thereafter the Crimean region remained independent and continued to exist as the Greek Principality of Theodoro. The Greek speaking residents of the Crimea were invited by Catherine the Great to resettle in, and found, the new city of Mariupol after the Russo-Turkish War (1768–1774) to escape the then Muslim dominated Crimea. Its main features present certain similarities with both the Pontic (e.g. the lack of synizesis of -ía, éa), and the northern varieties of the core dialects (e.g. the northern vocalism).

==== Istanbul Greek ====
Istanbul Greek is a dialect of Greek spoken in Istanbul, as well as by the Istanbul Greek emigre community in Athens. It is characterized by a high frequency of loanwords and grammatical structures imported from other languages, the main influences being Turkish, French, Italian and Armenian, while also preserving some archaic characteristics lost in other dialects. Speakers are noted for their production of dark L and postalveolar affricates.

==== Greco-Australian ====
Greco-Australian is an Australian-based dialect of Greek that is spoken by the Greek diaspora of Australia, including Greek immigrants living in Australia and Australians of Greek descent.

==== Other outlying varieties ====
In Asia Minor, Greek varieties existed not only in the broader area of Cappadocia, but also in the western coast. The most characteristic is the dialect of Smyrna which had a number of distinguishing features, such as certain differences in the accusative and genitive cases of the definite article; the Greek speakers of the area had also incorporated into their dialect many French words. Constantinopolitan Greek, on the other side, has very few dialectal features, and it is very close to what scholars call "Modern Greek Koiné."

Another Greek outlying dialect was spoken, until the mid-20th century, in Cargèse on Corsica, by descendants of 17th-century settlers from the Mani Peninsula. The dialect, which is now regarded as extinct, had preserved the main characteristics of the Mani dialect, and had been also influenced by both the Corsican and the French language (official language of the island after its union with France).

=== Core dialects ===
Map showing the distribution of major Modern Greek dialect areas spoken in Greece The dialect of Northern Epirus (not listed here) belongs to the southern varieties.

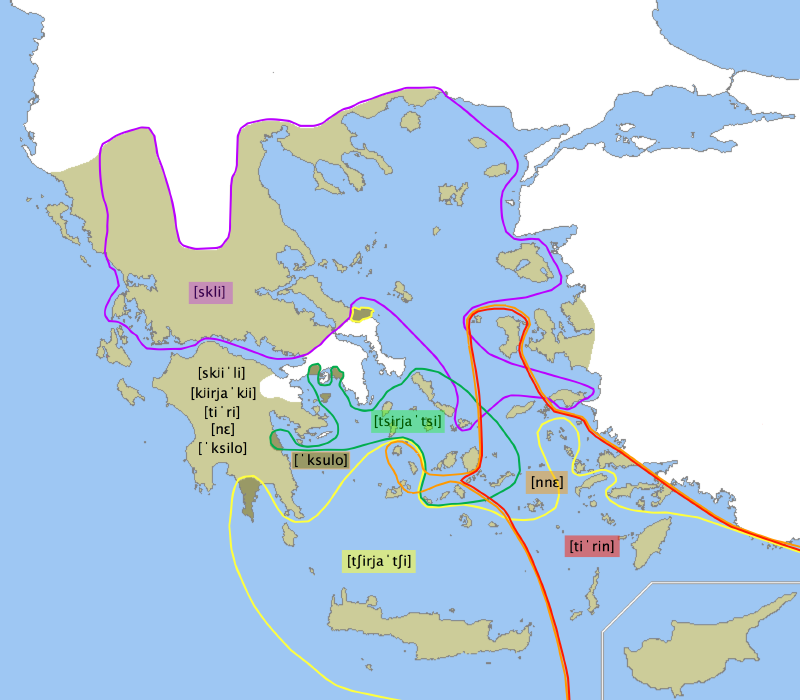
Map showing important isoglosses between the traditional Modern Greek dialects (c.1900).
- Purple: Area of "northern vocalism" (/skiˈli/ > [skli])
- Yellow: Area of palatalisation of /k/ > tʃ (/kiriaˈki/ > [tʃirjaˈtʃi]
- Green: Area of palatalisation of /k/ > [ts] (/kiriaˈki/ > [tsirjaˈtsi])
- Brown: Geminated initial consonants (/ne/ > [nne])
- Red: Retention of word-final /n/
- Dark brown: Historical /y/ > /u/

Unlike the above, the varieties described below form a contiguous Greek-speaking area, which covers most of the territory of Greece. They represent the vast majority of Greek speakers today. As they are less divergent from each other and from the standard, they are typically classified as mere "idioms" rather than "dialects" by Greek authors, in the native Greek terminology.

The most prominent contrasts between the present-day dialects are found between northern and southern varieties. Northern varieties cover most of continental Greece down to the Gulf of Corinth, while the southern varieties are spoken in the Peloponnese peninsula and the larger part of the Aegean and Ionian islands, including the large southern islands of Crete and Cyprus. The most salient defining marker of the northern varieties is their treatment of unstressed vowels (so-called northern vocalism), while many southern varieties are characterised, among other things, by their palatalisation of velar consonants. Between these areas, in a contiguous area around the capital Athens (i.e. the regions of Attica and neighbouring parts of Boeotia, Euboia, the Peloponnese and nearby islands), there is a "dialectal void" where no distinctly marked traditional Greek dialects are found. This is due to the fact that these areas were once predominantly inhabited by speakers of Arvanitika Albanian. The Greek spoken in this area today is the product of convergence between varieties of migrants who moved to the capital and its surroundings from various other parts of the country, and it is close to the standard. On the whole, Standard Modern Greek is based predominantly on the southern dialects, especially those of the Peloponnese.

At the fringes of this former Arvanitika-speaking area, there were once some enclaves of highly distinct traditional Greek dialects, believed to have been remnants of a formerly contiguous Greek dialect area from the time before the Arvanitic settlement. These include the old local dialect of Athens itself ("Old Athenian"), that of Megara (to the west of Attica), of Kymi in Euboia and of the island of Aegina. These dialects are now extinct.

The following linguistic markers have been used to distinguish and classify the dialects of Greece. Many of these features are today characteristic only of the traditional rural vernaculars and may be socially stigmatised. Younger, urban speakers throughout the country tend to converge towards accents closer to the standard language, with Cyprus being an exception to this.

==== Phonological features ====
- Northern vocalism (high vowel loss). In the north, unstressed high vowels (/i/ and /u/) are typically deleted (e.g. [skon] vs. standard [ˈskoni]) 'dust'). Unstressed mid vowels (/e/ and /o/) are raised to [i] and [u] instead (e.g. [piˈði] vs. standard [peˈði] 'child'). Subtypes of this phenomenon can be distinguished as follows: in "Extreme Northern" dialects these two processes apply throughout. In mid "Northern" dialects the deletion of /i/ and /u/ applies only to word-final vowels. "Semi-Northern" dialects only have the deletion of word-final /i/ and /u/, but not the raising of /e/ and /o/. The latter include Mykonos, Skiros, Lefkada and the urban dialect of the Greeks of Constantinople.
- Palatalisation. Standard Greek has an allophonic alternation between velar consonants ([k], [ɡ], [x], [ɣ]) and palatalised counterparts (([c], [ɟ], [ç], [ʝ]) before front vowels (/i/, /e/). In southern dialects, the palatalisation goes further towards affricates (e.g. [tʃe] vs. standard [ce] 'and'). Subtypes can be distinguished that have either palato-alveolar ([tʃ], [dʒ], [ʃ], [ʒ]) or alveolo-palatal sounds ([tɕ], [dʑ], [ɕ], [ʑ]). The former are reported for Cyprus, the latter for Crete, among others.
- Tsitakism. In a core area in which the palatalisation process has gone even further, covering mainly the Cycladic Islands, palatalised /k/ is further fronted to alveolar [t͡s] and thus merges with the original phoneme /t͡s/. This phenomenon is known in Greek as tsitakism (τσιτακισμός). It was also shared by Old Athenian.
- Ypsilon. A highly archaic feature shared by Tsakonian, the Maniot dialect, and the Old Athenian enclave dialects, is the divergent treatment of historical /y/ (<υ>). While this sound merged to /i/ everywhere else, these dialects have /u/ instead (e.g. [ˈksulo] vs. standard [ˈksilo] 'wood').
- Geminate consonants. Most Modern Greek varieties have lost the distinctively long (geminate) consonants found in Ancient Greek. However, the dialects of the south-eastern islands, including Cyprus, have preserved them, and even extended them to new environments such as word-initial positions. Thus, the word <ναι> 'yes' is pronounced with a distinctively long initial [nː] in Cypriot, and there are minimal pairs such as <φύλλο> [ˈfilːo] 'leaf' vs. <φύλο> [ˈfilo] 'gender', which are pronounced exactly the same in other dialects but distinguished by consonant length in Cypriot.
- Dark /l/. A distinctive marker of modern northern vernaculars, especially of Macedonia, is the use of a "dark" (velarised) [ɫ] sound.
- Medial fricative deletion. Some dialects of the Aegean Islands, especially in the Dodecanese, have a tendency of deleting intervocalic voiced fricatives /v/, /ð/, /ɣ/ (e.g. [meˈalo] vs. standard [meˈɣalo] 'big').
- Nasals and voiced plosives. Dialects differ in their phonetic treatment of the result of the assimilation of voiceless plosives with preceding nasals. All dialects have a voicing of the plosive in this position, but while some dialects also have an audible segment of prenasalisation, others do not; thus <πομπός> (pompós) 'transmitter' may be realised as either [poˈᵐbos] or [poˈbos]. Furthermore, prenasalisation tends to be preserved in more formal registers regardless of geography. In informal speech, it tends to be more common in northern varieties.
- Lack of synizesis of -ía, éa > /ja/. Standard Greek and most dialects have a pattern whereby Ancient Greek /e/ or /i/ immediately before an accented (later stressed) vowel have turned into a non-syllabic glide /j/, for instance in <παιδιά> [peˈðʝa] 'children', from Ancient Greek <παιδία> [pa͜idía]. In some dialects this process has not taken place or has done so only partially. These dialects display either full preservation of [e, i], or a schwa sound [ə], leading to forms such as <φωλέα> [foˈle.a] 'nest' and <παιδία> [peˈði.a] 'children'. The phenomenon is common in Griko and Pontic. It is also reported in Mani and Kythira. On the other hand, in some dialects that have /j/, the glide gets further reduced and deleted after a preceding sibilant (/s, z/), leading to forms like <νησά> [niˈsa] 'islands' instead of standard <νησιά> [niˈsça] (de-palatalisation of sibilants).

==== Grammatical features ====
- Final /n/. Most Modern Greek varieties have lost word-final -n, once a part of many inflectional suffixes of Ancient Greek, in most words except for a few fossilized cases in basic vocabulary. The south-eastern islands have preserved it in many words (e.g. είπεν, [ˈipen] vs. standard είπε, [ˈipe] he said; τυρίν [tiˈrin] vs. standard τυρί [tiˈri] 'cheese').
- inda? versus ti? In Standard Greek, the interrogative pronoun what? is τί (tí). In most of the Aegean Islands (except at its geographical fringe: Rhodes in the south-east, Lemnos, Thasos and the Sporades in the north; and Andros in the west) as well as in Cyprus, it is είντα (índa).
- Indirect objects. All Modern Greek dialects have lost the dative case. In some dialects, this has resulted in a merger between the dative and the genitive, whereas in others there has been a merger between the dative and the accusative. In the standard and in the southern dialects, the personal pronoun forms used to express indirect objects are those of the genitive case, as in example 1 below. In northern dialects, like Macedonian; mainly in Thessaloniki, Constantinople, Rhodes, and in Mesa Mani, the accusative forms are used instead, as in example 2. In plural, only the accusative forms are used both in southern and northern dialects.

(1)	Standard Greek:	Σου you.GEN	δίνω I-give	το βιβλίο the book
(2)	Northern Greek:	Σε you.ACC	δίνω I-give	το βιβλίο the book
		'I give you the book'
