= Cappadocian Greek =

Dialect of Modern Greek

Cappadocian
- Region: Greece, originally Cappadocia (modern-day Central Turkey)
- Native speakers: 2,800 (2015)
- Language family: Indo-European: Hellenic; Greek; (disputed); Attic–Ionic; Attic; Koine; Medieval Greek; Asia Minor Greek; Cappadocian

Language codes
- ISO 639-3: cpg
- Glottolog: capp1239
- ELP: Cappadocian Greek
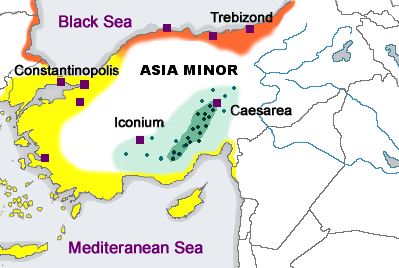
- Asia Minor Greek dialects until 1923. Demotic in yellow. Pontic in orange. Cappadocian in green, with green dots indicating individual Cappadocian Greek villages in 1910.

- Cappadocian Greek is classified as Critically Endangered by the UNESCO Atlas of the World's Languages in Danger

Cappadocian Greek (endonym: Καππαδοκικά, Καππαδοκική διάλεκτος), also known as Cappadocian, is a dialect of Modern Greek, originally spoken in Cappadocia (modern-day Central Turkey) by the descendants of the Byzantines of Anatolia. The language originally diverged from Medieval Greek after the late 11th century migrations of the Seljuk Turks from Central Asia into what is now Turkey began cutting the Cappadocians off from the rest of the Greek-speaking Byzantine Empire.

As a result of the population exchange between Greece and Turkey in 1923, all remaining speakers (known in Turkey as Rûm, and referred to now as Cappadocian Greeks) were forced to emigrate to Greece where they were resettled in various locations, primarily in Central and Northern Greece. The Cappadocians were encouraged to shift to Standard Modern Greek as part of their integration into Greece, and their language was thought to have been extinct since the 1960s. In June 2005, Mark Janse (Ghent University) and Dimitris Papazachariou (University of Patras) discovered Cappadocians in Central and Northern Greece who could still speak their ancestral language fluently. Many are middle-aged, third-generation speakers who take a very positive attitude towards the language, as opposed to their parents and grandparents. The latter are much less inclined to speak Cappadocian and more often than not switch to Standard Modern Greek.

== History and research ==
By the fifth century AD, the last of the Indo-European native languages of Asia Minor ceased to be spoken, replaced by Koine Greek. At the same time, the communities of central Anatolia were becoming actively involved in the affairs of the then Greek-speaking Byzantine Empire, and some (now Greek-speaking) Cappadocians, such as Maurice Tiberius (r. 582–602) and Heraclius (r. 610 to 641), would even rise to become emperors.

Cappadocian Greek first began to diverge from the Medieval Greek common language of the Byzantine Empire six centuries later, following the Byzantines' defeat at the Battle of Manzikert in 1071. This subsequent civil war and the Seljuk invasion led to the severing of Cappadocia from the rest of the Byzantine world. Among all Greek dialects, Cappadocian Greek is the one most influenced by Turkish, but unlike Standard Modern Greek, it would not be influenced by Venetian or French, which entered Modern Greek during the Frankokratia period, when those groups began ruling in Greece following the Fourth Crusade's sacking of Byzantine Constantinople.

The earliest records of the language are in the macaronic poems of Jalal ad-Din Muhammad Rumi (1207–1273), who lived in Iconium (Konya), and some ghazals by his son Sultan Walad. Interpretation of the Greek language texts is difficult as they are written in Arabic script, and in Rumi's case without vowel points; Dedes' edition (Δέδες) is the most recent edition.

By the early 20th century, many Cappadocians had shifted to Turkish altogether (written with the Greek alphabet). Where Greek was maintained (numerous villages near Kayseri, including Misthi, Malakopea, Prokopion, Karvali, and Anakou), it became heavily influenced by the surrounding Turkish. However, there are next to no written documents in Medieval or early Modern Cappadocian, as the language was, and still essentially is, a spoken language only. Those educated to read and write, such as priests, would do so in the more classicising literary Greek. The earliest outside studies of spoken Cappadocian date from the 19th century, but are generally not very accurate.

One of the first documented studies was Modern Greek in Asia Minor: A study of dialect of Silly, Cappadocia and Pharasa (Cambridge: Cambridge University Press, 1916), by Richard MacGillivray Dawkins (1871–1955), then a fellow of Emmanuel College, Cambridge and later the first Bywater and Sotheby Professor of Byzantine and Modern Greek Language and Literature at the University of Oxford, based on fieldwork conducted by the author in Cappadocia in 1909–1911. This included the Silliot Greek and Pharasiot Greek dialects spoken in Sille, Konya and Pharasa respectively.

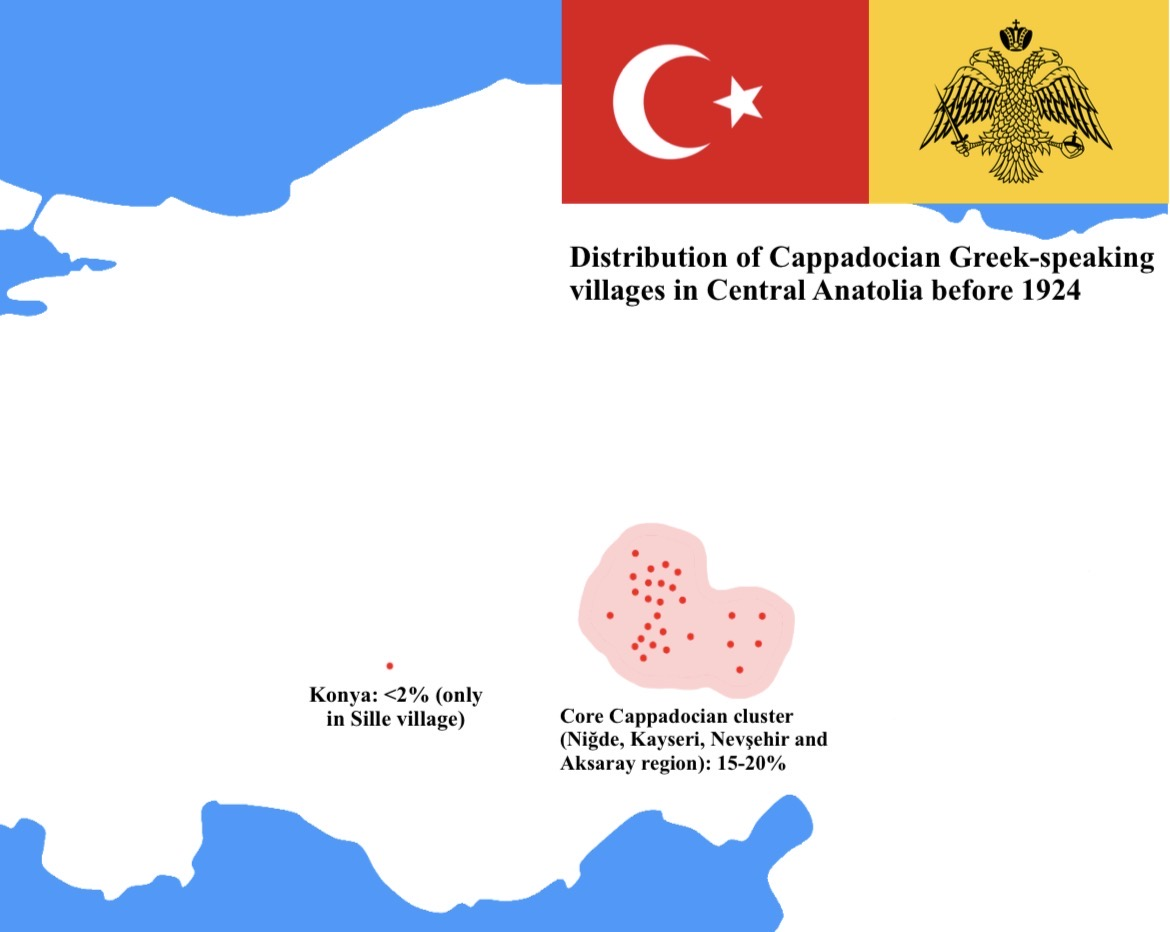
Distribution of Cappadocian Greek-speaking villages in Central Anatolia before 1924

After the population exchange, several Cappadocian dialects have been described by collaborators of the Center for Asia Minor Studies (Κέντρον Μικρασιατικών Σπουδών) in Athens: Uluağaç (I.I. Kesisoglou, 1951), Aravan (D. Phosteris & I.I. Kesisoglou, 1960), Axo (G. Mavrochalyvidis & I.I. Kesisoglou, 1960) and Anaku (A.P. Costakis, 1964), resulting in a series of grammars.

In the 21st century, the study of Cappadocian has seen a revival following the pioneering work on Language Contact, Creolization, and Genetic Linguistics (Berkeley: University of California Press, 1988) by Sarah Grey Thomason and Terrence Kaufman, and a series of publications on various aspects of Cappadocian linguistics by Mark Janse, professor at Roosevelt Academy, who has also contributed a grammatical survey of Cappadocian to a forthcoming handbook on Modern Greek dialects edited by Christos Tzitzilis (Aristotle University of Thessaloniki).

The discovery of Cappadocian speakers by Janse and Papazachariou will result in the release of a new dictionary and a compilation of texts.

Cappadocian Greek is well-known from the linguistic literature as being one of the first well-documented cases of language death, and in particular the significant admixture of non-Indo-European linguistic features into an Indo-European language. This process was pronounced in southwestern Cappadocia, and included the introduction of vowel harmony and verb-final word order.

== Characteristics ==
The Greek element in Cappadocian is to a large extent Byzantine, e.g. θίρ or tír 'door' from (Ancient and) Byzantine Greek θύρα (Modern Greek πόρτα, from Italian), ποίκα or έπκα 'I did' from Byzantine Greek έποικα (Modern Greek έκανα). Other, pre-Byzantine, archaisms are the use of the possessive adjectives μό(ν), σό(ν) etc. from Ancient Greek ἐμός, σός, etc. and the formation of the imperfect by means of the suffix -ισ̌κ- from the Ancient Greek (Ionic) iterative suffix -(ε)σκ-. Turkish influence appears at every level. The Cappadocian sound system includes the Turkish vowels ı, ö, ü, and the Turkish consonants b, d, g, š, ž, tš, dž, although some of these are also found in modern Greek words as a result of palatalization.

Cappadocian noun morphology is characterized by the emergence of a generalized agglutinative declension and the progressive loss of grammatical gender distinctions, e.g. το ναίκα 'the (neuter) woman (feminine)', genitive ναίκα-ιου, plural ναίκες, genitive ναίκεζ-ιου (Ulağaç). Another Turkish feature is the morphological marking of definiteness in the accusative case, e.g. λύκος 'wolf (nominative / unmarked indefinite accusative)' vs. λύκο 'wolf (marked definite accusative)'.

Some South Cappadocian varieties—most notably Ulağaç Cappadocian (UC)—show complete neutralization of grammatical gender in the noun phrase: the neuter definite article do (sg.) and da (pl.) and neuter adjective forms are used with all nouns regardless of their historical gender, i.e. a genderless determiner phrase.

For example:

Form	Ulağaç Cappadocian	Gloss	English
Singular	do kalon do andra	the.good.N the.man.M	‘the good man’
Singular	do kalon do neka	the.good.N the.woman.F	‘the good woman’
Singular	do kalon do pei	the.good.N the.child.N	‘the good child’
Plural	da kalan da andres	the.good.N.PL the.men.M	‘the good men’
Plural	da kalan da nekes	the.good.N.PL the.women.F	‘the good women’
Plural	da kalan da peija	the.good.N.PL the.children.N	‘the good children’

Kesisoglou (1951) already notes the generalized use of do/da in UC; later analyses document and discuss the system in detail. A typical UC sentence (cited via Kesisoglou and discussed by Janse) is: itó do néka do ándra-t páasen do do xorjó, which can mean either ‘that woman led her husband to the village’ or ‘that woman, her husband led her to the village’, illustrating uniform neuter targets (do) with historically feminine and masculine nouns and the resulting nominative–accusative ambiguity.

Agglutinative forms are also found in the verb system such as the pluperfect ήρτα τον 'I had come' (lit. 'I came I was') (Delmeso) on the model of Turkish geldi idi (geldiydi). Although Cappadocian word order is essentially governed by discourse considerations such as topic and focus, there is a tendency towards the Turkish subject–object–verb word order with its typological correlates (suffixation and pre-nominal grammatical modifiers). Turkish vowel harmony is found in forms such as δϋσ̌ϋνδΰζϋ 'I think', aor. 3sg δϋσ̌ΰντσϋ < δϋσ̌ΰντσι (Malakopi), from Turkish düşünmek, πατισ̌αχης < πατισ̌άχις 'king' (Delmeso), from Turkish padişah.

The commonality among all Greek Cappadocian dialects is that they evolved from Byzantine Greek under the influence of Turkish. On the other hand, those dialects evolved in isolated villages. This has resulted in a variety of Greek Cappadocian dialects.

== Revitalisation ==
Although Cappadocian Greek was once believed to be a dead language, the discovery of a population of speakers has led to an increase in awareness, both within and outside of the Cappadocian community in Greece. In the documentary Last Words, which follows Mark Janse through Cappadocian-speaking villages on the Greek mainland, community members are seen encouraging each other to use their dialect for ordinary things, such as joke telling. The members of these villages, including such notable figures as the bishop, recount being touched by a presentation given in Cappadocian by Janse on a visit to the region. The bishop went so far as to say that Janse's speech "has lifted their shame." The revitalisation process is seen through examples such as this, wherein the speakers have begun to take back their identity and embrace their mother tongue. Additionally, younger generations are embracing the power of technology to spread awareness, utilising social media about the language to inform the larger Greek population.

== Dialects ==
- Northeastern Cappadocian (Sinasos, Potamia, Delmeso)
- Northwestern Cappadocian (Silata or Zila, Anaku, Flojita, Malakopi)
- Central Cappadocian (Axo; Misthi) (See Misthiotica)
- Southwestern Cappadocian (Aravan, Gurzono; Fertek)
- Southeastern Cappadocian (Oulagatz (Uluağaç), Semendere)

== See also ==
- Cappadocian Greeks
- Pharasiot Greek
- Silliot Greek
- Pontic Greek
- Karamanli Turkish

== Bibliography ==
- Αναστασιάδης, Β. 1975. Ιστορία και γλώσσα της Καππαδοκίας και το ιδίωμα των Φαράσων. Μικρασιατικά Χρονικά 16: 150–184.
- Αναστασιάδη-Μανουσάκη, Σ., Μνήμες Καππαδοκίας ΚΜΣ Αθήνα 2002
- Ανδριώτης, Ν.Π. 1948. Το γλωσσικό ιδίωμα των Φαράσων.
- Αρχέλαος, Ι.Σ. 1899. Η Σινασός. Αθήνα: Ιωάννης Νικολαΐδης. 134–139, 144–147, 150–153.
- Costakis, A. 1964. Le Parler Grec d'Anakou. Athens: Centre d'Études d'Asie Mineure.
- Costakis, A. 1968. Το γλωσσικό ιδίωμα της Σίλλης. Athens: Centre d'Études d'Asie Mineure.
- Dawkins, R.M. 1916. Modern Greek in Asia Minor. A study of dialect of Silly, Cappadocia and Pharasa. Cambridge: Cambridge University Press.
- Dawkins, R.M. 1921. Cyprus and the Asia Minor Dialects of Asia Minor. Αφιέρωμα εις Γ.Ν. Χατζιδάκιν. Αθήνα: Π.Δ. Σακελλαρίου. 42–59. passim.
- Dawkins, R.M. 1955. The Boy's Dream. Μικρασιατικά Χρονικά 6: 268–282.
- Θεοδωρίδης, Θ. 1960–61. Φαρασιώτικες παραδόσεις, μύθοι και παραμύθια. Λαογραφία 19: 222–259.
- Θεοδωρίδης, Θ. 1963–64. Φαρασιώτικες παραδόσεις, μύθοι και παραμύθια (Συλλογή δευτέρα). Λαογραφία 21: 269–336.
- Θεοδωρίδης, Θ. 1988. Βαρασώτικα τραγώδε. Μικρασιατικά Χρονικά 18: 41–89.
- Grégoire, H. 1909. Appendice: Notes sur le dialecte de Farasha. Bulletin de Correspondance Héllénique 33: 148–159.
- Janse, M. 1994. Son of Wackernagel. The Distribution of Object Clitic Pronouns in Cappadocian. Irene Philippaki-Warburton, Katerina Nicolaidis & Maria Sifianou (eds.): Themes in Greek Linguistics. Papers from the First International Conference on Greek Linguistics, Reading, September 1993 (Current issues in Linguistic Theory, 117. Amsterdam: Benjamins. 435–442.
- Janse, M. 1997. Synenclisis, Metenclisis, Dienclisis. The Cappadocian Evidence. Gabriel Drachman, Angeliki Malikouti-Drachman, Jannis Fykias & Sila Klidi (eds.): Greek Linguistics '95. Proceedings of the 2nd International Conference on Greek Linguistics (Salzburg, 22–24 Sep 1995. Graz: Neugebauer. 695–706.
- Janse, M. 1998a. Cappadocian Clitics and the Syntax-Morphology Interface. Brian D. Joseph, Geoffrey Horrocks & Irene Philippaki-Warburton (eds.): Themes in Greek Linguistics II (Current Issues in Linguistic Theory, 159). Amsterdam: Benjamins. 257–281.
- Janse, M. 1998b. Grammaticalization and Typological Change. The Clitic Cline in Inner Asia Minor Greek. Mark Janse (ed.): Productivity and Creativity. Studies in General and Descriptive Linguistics in Honor of E.M. Uhlenbeck (Trends in Linguistics. Studies and Monographs, 116). Berlin: Mouton de Gruyter. 521–547.
- Janse, M. 1998c. Le grec au contact du Turc. Le cas des relatives en Cappadocien. In Caron, B. (ed.), Proceedings of the 16th international congress of linguistics, 20–25 July 1997. Amsterdam: Elsevier Science. Paper no. 338.
- Janse, M. 1999. Greek, Turkish, and Cappadocian Relatives Revis(it)ed. Amalia Mozer (ed.): Greek Linguistics '97. Proceedings of the 3rd International Conference on Greek Linguistics. Athens: Ellinika Grammata. 453–462.
- Janse, M. 2001a. Morphological Borrowing in Asia Minor. Yoryia Aggouraki, Amalia Arvaniti, J.I.M. Davy, Dionysis Goutsos, Marilena Karyolaimou, Anna Panagiotou, Andreas Papapavlou, Pavlos Pavlou, Anna Roussou (eds.), Proceedings of the 4th International Conference on Greek Linguistics (Nicosia, 17–19 September 1999). Thessaloniki: University Studio Press. 473–479.
- Janse, M. 2001b. Cappadocian Variables. Mark Janse, Brian D. Joseph & Angela Ralli (eds.), Proceedings of the First International Conference of Modern Greek Dialects and Linguistic Theory. Patras: University of Patras. 79–88.
- Janse, M. 2002. Aspects of Bilingualism in the History of the Greek Language. J.N. Adams, Mark Janse & Simon Swain (eds.), Bilingualism in Ancient Society. Language Contact and the Written Word. Oxford: Oxford University Press. 332–390.
- Janse, M. 2004. Παλιό κρασί σε καινούρια ασκιά. Τουρκοελληνικά «αναφορικά» στην κεντρική Μικρασία. Νεοελληνική διαλεκτολογία. Τόμος 4ος. Πρακτικά του Τέταρτου Διεθνούς Συνεδρίου Νεοελληνικής Διαλεκτολογίας. Αθήνα: Εταιρεία Νεοελληνικής Διαλεκτολογίας. 173–182.
- Janse, M. 2004. Animacy, Definiteness and Case in Cappadocian and other Asia Minor Greek Dialects. Journal of Greek Linguistics 5: 3–26.
- Janse, M. 2006a. Η καππαδοκική διάλεκτος. Χρ. Τζιτζιλής (ed.), Νεοελληνικές διάλεκτοι. Θεσσαλονίκη: Ινστιτούτο Νεοελληνικών Σπουδών (΄Ιδρυμα Μανόλη Τριανταφυλλίδη). In press.
- Janse, M. 2006b. Object Position in Asia Minor Greek. Mark Janse, Brian D. Joseph & Angela Ralli (eds.), Proceedings of the Second International Conference of Modern Greek Dialects and Linguistic Theory. Patras: University of Patras. In press.
- Janse, M. 2006c. Clitic Doubling from Ancient to Asia Minor Greek. Dalina Kallulli & Liliane Tasmowski (eds.), Clitic Doubling in the Balkan Languages (Linguistics Today). Amsterdam: John Benjamins. In preparation.
- Joseph, B.D. 1997. Cappadocian Greek αρέ 'now' and related adverbs: The effects of conflation, composition and resegmentation. Στο Φιλερήμου Αγάπησις: Τιμητικός Τόμος για τον καθηγητή Αγαπητό Γ. Τσοπανάκη. Ρόδος: Στέγη Γραμμάτων και Τεχνών Δωδεκανήσου. 115–122.
- Καρατζά Ε. Καππαδοκία, Ο τελευταίος Ελληνισμός της περιφέρειας Ακσεράι - Γκέλβερι, Γνώση, Αθήνα 1985
- Karatsareas, Petros. 2009. The loss of grammatical gender in Cappadocian Greek. Transactions of the Philological Society 107, 2: 196–230.
- Karatsareas, Petros. 2011. A study of Cappadocian Greek nominal morphology from a diachronic and dialectological perspective. Unpublished PhD dissertation. University of Cambridge, Cambridge, United Kingdom.
- Karatsareas, Petros. 2013. Understanding diachronic change in Cappadocian Greek: the dialectological perspective. Journal of Historical Linguistics 3, 2: 192–229.
- Karatsareas, Petros. 2016a. Convergence in word structure: revisiting 'agglutinative' noun inflection in Cappadocian Greek. Diachronica 33(1), 31–66.
- Karatsareas, Petros. 2016b. The adpositional cycle in Asia Minor Greek: a tale of multiple causation. Journal of Greek Linguistics 16(1), 47–86.
- Lekakou, Marika & Petros Karatsareas. 2016. Marking definiteness multiply: evidence from two varieties of Greek. Studies in Greek Linguistics 36, 189–204.
- Κεσίσογλου, Ι.Ι. 1951. Το γλωσσικό ιδίωμα του Ουλαγάτς. Αθήνα: Γαλλικό Ινστιτούτο Αθηνών.
- Kooij, Jan G. & Revithiadou, Anthi. 2001. Greek Dialects in Asia Minor. Accentuation in Pontic and Cappadocian. Journal of Greek Linguistics 2: 75–117.
- Λεβίδης, Α., Αι εν μονολίθοις μοναί Καππαδοκίοας-Λυκανονίας, Κωνσταντινούπολις 1899
- Λουκόπουλος, Δ. & Λουκάτος, Δ.Σ. 1951. Παροιμίες των Φαράσων. Αθήνα: Institut Français d'Athènes.
- Μαυροχαλυβίδης, Γ. & Κεσίσογλου, Ι.Ι. 1960. Το γλωσσικό ιδίωμα της Αξού. Αθήνα: Γαλλικό Ινστιτούτο Αθηνών.
- Mirambel, A. 1965. Remarques sur les Systèmes Vocaliques des Dialects Néo-Grecs d'Asie Mineure. Bulletin de la Société Linguistique de Paris 60: 18–45.
- Ralli, A. 2009. Morphology meets Dialectology: insights from Modern Greek Dialects. Morphology 19 (2): 87–105.
- Ralli, A. 2012. Morphology in language contact: verbal loanblend formation in Asia Minor Greek. In M. Vanhov et al. eds. Morphologies in Contact, 177–194.
- Revithiadou, Anthi. 2006. Prosodic Filters on Syntax. An Interface Account of Second Position Clitics. Lingua 116: 79–111.
- Τσαλίκογλους, Ε.Ι. 1970. Πότε και πώς ετουρκοφώνησεν η Καππαδοκία. Μικρασιατικά Χρονικά 14: 9–30.
- Φάβης, Β. 1948. Συντακτικαί παρατηρήσεις εις το γλωσσικόν ιδίωμα Φαράσων. Επετηρίς της Εταιρεία Βυζαντινών Σπουδών 18: 173–191.
- Φωστέρης, Δ. & Κεσίσογλου, Ι.Ι. 1950. Λεξιλόγιο του Αραβανί. Αθήνα: Γαλλικό Ινστιτούτο Αθηνών.
- Φωστέρης, Δ.Π. 1952. Το Αραβάνιον. Μικρασιατικά Χρονικά 5: 133–177.

=== Rumi and Sultan Walad ===
- Δέδες, Δ. 1993. Ποιήματα του Μαυλανά Ρουμή. Τα Ιστορικά 10.18–19: 3–22.
- Meyer, G. 1895. Die griechischen Verse in Rabâbnâma. Byzantinische Zeitschrift 4: 401–411.
- Mertzios, C.D. 1958. Quelques vers grecs du XIIIe siècle en caractères arabes. Byzantinische Zeitschrift 51: 1516.
- Burguière, P. 1952. Quelques vers grecs du XIIIe siècle en caractères arabes. Byzantion 22: 63–80.
