= Angela Ralli =

Linguist

Angela Ralli is a Greek linguist, morphologist and dialectologist.

== Biography ==
Ralli received her BA, MA and PhD in linguistics from the Université de Montréal. From 1985 to 1990 she worked on the Greek section of the Eurotra project. In 1990 she took up a post at the University of Athens, first as a lecturer and then (from 1994) as assistant professor. In 1997 she moved to the University of Patras as associate professor, becoming promoted to full professor in 2001.

Ralli has held visiting positions at the University of Amsterdam (1996), Catania, L'Aquila and Turin (2003), the Royal Flemish Academy of Belgium for Science and the Arts (2008 and 2014), Princeton University (2012), UQAM (2017), and Saint Petersburg State University (2020). In 2013 she was elected as a member of the Academia Europaea.

== Research ==
Ralli is known for her work in morphological theory, and has worked extensively on morphological variation and change, including language contact. She founded the Laboratory of Modern Greek Dialects in 2000, serving as its director until 2020. She also developed Greece's first electronic linguistic atlas, focusing on the dialect of Lesbos.

== Selected publications ==
- Nespor, Marina, and Angela Ralli. 1996. Morphology–phonology interface: Phonological domains in Greek compounds. The Linguistic Review 13, 357–382. doi:10.1515/tlir.1996.13.3-4.357
- Ralli, Angela. 2000. A feature-based analysis of Greek nominal inflection. Glossologia 11–12, 201–227.
- Ralli, Angela. 2002. The role of morphology in gender determination: evidence from Modern Greek. Linguistics 40, 519–551. doi:10.1515/ling.2002.022
- Ralli, Angela. 2003. Morphology in Greek linguistics: the state of the art. Journal of Greek Linguistics 4, 77–129. doi:10.1075/jgl.4.09ral
- Ralli, Angela. 2008. Compound markers and parametric variation. Language Typology and Universals 61, 19–38. doi:10.1524/stuf.2008.0004
- Ralli, Angela. 2012. Compounding in Modern Greek. Dordrecht: Springer. ISBN 9789400749603
