= Misthi, Cappadocia =

Greek city in Cappadocia, now Konaklı

Aerial photo of Misthi / Konaklı today

Misthi or Misti (Greek: Μιστί or Μισθί) was a Greek city in the region of Cappadocia, which is in modern-day Turkey. It was situated 82 kilometres southwest of the regional capital, Caesarea (Greek: Καισαρεία), now known as Kayseri, Turkey. Administratively, it was a part of the nearby city of Niğde, situated 26 kilometres north-northwest at an altitude of 1380 metres above sea level. The current name of the town is Konaklı.

== Introduction ==
«’Απ’ Μιστί ’μι, νά πάμ’ σ’ Μιστί»

(From Misthi I am, let's go to Misthi)

=== Origines ===
There exist multiple explanations about the origins and establishment of the city as well as about the etymology of its name. For instance, according to Koimisoglou some sources trace the origin of Misthi to 401 BC when Greek mercenaries came to work for the Persian king Cyrus in the battle against his brother Artaxerxes II. A group of Greek soldiers was given the order to search for food and water. Some of them found an uninhabited area and settled down. Allegedly, they built a city there that became Misthi. This version of the city's creation, although interesting, has not yet become scientifically verified. Another version is that of Anastasiades (1995:16) who argues that the city was built by Greek mercenaries that were part of Alexander the Great's army. Rizos (1856:99-100), on the other hand, claims that the inhabitants of Misthi were originally from the Greek islands of Delos, Lemnos and Naxos while Carolides argues that the inhabitants of Misthi were simply Greeks from the lower port cities that came to Misthi to work as paid labour farmers. Koimisoglou also provides an explanation as to the etymology of the city's name. The ancient Greek word for mercenary is Μίσθιος (Místhios) (sing.) and in plural Μίσθιοι (Místhii) and in Modern Greek Μισθοφόροι (Misthofóri) or Μισθωτοί (Misthotí). Thus the name of the city he argues was a reflection of the inhabitants' original occupation. However, this is also a non-verified explanation. As it happens, the connotation of the word ‘Misthii’, although originally meaning mercenary, transformed during Byzantine times to denote labour-work, i.e. paid labour. Thus some authors have been inclined to suggest that the name refers to the skilled church builders of the city who often travelled far and took part in the constructing of churches.

The city was inhabited purely by Greeks practicing the orthodox religion and wrongfully described as being turcophonic (speakers of the Turkish language). At closer scrutiny however, the Greek dialect spoken, also referred to as Misthiotica, is a dialect based on ancient Greek drawing heavily on Byzantine Greek and with major influx of Turkish loan words. Misthiotica (still spoken today) is a unique dialect (language) linguistically belonging to the Greek Cappadocian group of languages. Misthiotica was a consequence of the isolation the inhabitants suffered from that of other Greek cities and villages. Misthiotica was, however, also spoken by inhabitants of the nearby villages of Tsaricli, Dila (Dilion), Tseltek and Cavaclou because these villages were founded by Misthiotes.

In reality Misthi ceased to exist after the exodus of the Misthiotes from Misthi which occurred following the population exchange according to the Treaty of Lausanne of 1923 signed by Greece and Turkey. Many of the Misthiotes would simply not believe that they would be forced to leave their homeland and continued to conduct their daily duties as traders, farmers and handicraftsmen after the news had arrived. However, when Turkish authority officials entered the village and forced them to leave they had no choice. In just two days, between Tuesday, 24 June and Wednesday, 25 June 1924, the population of Misthi comprising then of approximately 4400 people left Misthi and Cappadocia for Greece never to return again. They went by foot to the seaport of Mersina and embarked on the dangerous journey by sea to the port of Piraeus, Athens, Greece. They left Turkey as Greeks and were received in Greece as Turks. The Mistiotes were among the last identified Greeks to leave Turkey, their exodus ended permanently a period of over 2500 consecutive years of Hellenic presence in Asia Minor. The Misthiotes settled down in the following places in Greece but as their descendants have reached the fourth, and in some cases the fifth and sixth generation, they are to be found predominantly in the larger cities of Greece such as Thessaloniki and Athens.

List of settling places of the first generation Misthiotes in Greece:

- Ξηροχώρι Xirochori [in the Misthiotica dialect: Gördana²] (Salonica, Prefecture of Macedonia)
- Νέο Αγιονέρι Neo Agioneri [in the Misthiotica dialect: Várlantza] (Kilkis, Prefecture of Macedonia)
- Μάνδρα Mandra Larissis [in the Misthiotica dialect: Thomai³] (Larissa, Prefecture of Thessaly)
- Αμυγδαλέα Amygdalea (Larissa, Prefecture of Thessaly)
- Νεοχώρι Neochori (Evros, Prefecture of Thrace)
- Κόνιτσα Konitsa (Ioannina Prefecture of Epirus)
- Ξάνθη Xanthi (Xanthi Prefecture of Thrace)
- Διπόταμο Dipotamo (Kavala, Prefecture of Thrace)
- Κομνηνά Komnina (Kozani Prefecture of Macedonia)
- Άγιος Χαράλαμπος [[Agios Charalampos], [in the Misthiotica dialect: Tsagli], [Prefecture of Thessaly]]

² The name "Gördana" applied by the Misthiotes in their local dialect on current Xerochori seems most likely to be derived from the Bulgarian female name "Gordana". This name is in turn derived from "Gordiana", the feminine form of the Latin "Gordianus" (cf. Gordian). If true then the Misthiotes arriving by foot in the 1920s probably adopted the name from the village's previous inhabitants which are known to have been of Slavic origin and forced to move north due to the various wars the region was faced with resulting in the territory becoming annexed by Greece.

³ The name "Tomai" applied by the Misthiotes on current Mandra seems most likely to be derived from the Serbian and Bulgarian form of the name "Thomas". As with the original name on Xerochori, if true it may indicate the ethnicity of the village's previous inhabitants.

=== Konaklı – Misthi today ===
The city of Misthi is today inhabited by about 4000 Turkish citizens originating from the population exchange of 1924 between Greece and Turkey. The inhabitants are mostly descendants of Turks born in Thessaloniki, Greece (Tr. Selanik) and in the Kozani region at the turn of the 20th century. Descendants of the current inhabitants of the city came to Misthi while the Misthiotes had not yet left the city. When the Greeks population left the city the name changed from Misthi to Misly. Today, the city is known as Konaklı.

== Culture ==
=== Γαβούστημα (Annual Panhellenic Meeting) ===
"Modern" misthiotes. Stella Kaiserlidou, discussing Misthiotic gastronomy in Thessaloniki.

Difficult times in the new country. John Tsinides, a misthiote here with his wife in the new lands. Photo taken outside their home in Mandra Larissis, Greece, in the early 1950s.

Farming tools and their names in the Misthiotica dialect.

By the end of the 1990s the organizing committees of the descendants from the cities of Misthi and the towns of Tsaricli, Dela (Dilion), Tseltek and Cavaclou agreed to a first Annual Panhellenic Meeting in Mandra, Larissa (Greece). These meetings have since then been arranged at different locations in Greece where Misthiotes (and those related to them) settled down. In reality, the Annual Panhellenic Meeting is a cultural festival with activities ranging from art, music and dance exhibitions, academic lectures (often concerning history), gastronomical tours as well as book exposition. This event has proven highly successful in many respects and has attracted more than 3000 participants every year. In many cases, families have found relatives they did not know exist which has resulted in the illumination of their ancestry. The Gavoustema has also meant the resurrection of the Misthiotic culture which to many, especially to the youngest generations, has been completely unknown. As a result, the Gavoustema has spurred several individuals to engage in layman investigations or professional academic research about the history, culture and language of the Misthiotes.

The Gavoustema has been hosted by the following cities:

- 1997 Mandra, Larissa (August)
- 1998 Xanthi (August)
- 1999 Konitsa, Ioannena (August)
- 2000 Kokkinochoma, Kavala (August)
- 2001 Ano Mavrolofo, Magnesia (17–19 August)
- 2002 Xerochori, Salonica (23–24 August)
- 2003 Neo Agioneri, Kilkis (22–24 August)
- 2004 Alexandroupolis (6–8 August)
- 2005 Mandra, Larissa (19–21 August)
- 2006 Kavala (August). Guest lecture will be given by prominent professor of Linguistics and Classics Mark Janse who has focused his research on Cappadocian Greek dialects. Visit Professor Mark Janse's homepage.)
- 2007 - .
- 2008 Plagia, Kilkis (August).
- 2009 Kavala (August).
- 2010 Alexandroupolis (20–22 August).
- 2011 Neos Mylotopos, Pella (19–21 August).
- 2012 Neo Agioneri, Kilkis (24–25 August)
- 2013 Neokaisaria, Ioannena (23–25 August)
- 2014 Petrana, Kozani (22–23 August)

=== Misthiotica dialect ===
The Misthiotica dialect belongs to the Cappadocian branch of Greek and is thought to be based on Byzantine Greek with archaic features preserved as well as attached with a plethora of loanwords from Turkish. Some examples of this dialect are:

| Misthiotica | Transcribed | Demotic/Modern Greek | Meaning | Remarks |
Nouns
| Αεφλό/Αελφό, αελφί | Aefló/Aelfó, aelfí | Αδελφός, αδελφή | Brother/Brother, Sister | Simplification. Omission of Greek delta "-d-" |
| Αστενάρ | Astenar | Ασθενής | Patient | Simplification. "σθ->στ" |
| Βαβάς | Vavás | Πατέρας, μπαμπάς | Father, daddy | |
| Βαλί | Vali | Βουβάλι | Buffalo | Simplification. Omission of initial syllable "Bu-" |
| Βρεχός | Vrechos | Βροχή | Rain | Gender alteration. |
| Διάολους | Diaolus | Διάβολος/Διάολος | Devil | Use of "ου" instead of "ο" |
| Κιρυός | Cirios | Αέρας | Air | Unknown origin of word -perhaps from κρύος αέρας (cold, chilly air), similar to νερό from νεαρόν ύδωρ |
| Κρομμό | Crommó | Κρεμμύδι | Onion | Simplification. Omission of middle syllable "-mi-" |
| Λαλάτζα | Lalándza | Λουκουμάδες | Greek style dougnuts made of fried dessert dough | From Byzantine Lallangia (Λαλλάγγια) (Fried bread, cf. Lallangita)>Hellenistic Lallangi>Archaic Greek Laganon (wide but thin pita-like bread made with herbs and sesame seeds on it) [a predecessor to the current well-known pizza] |
| Λερό | Leró | Νερό | Water | Ν->Λ (N->L) |
| Μανάλ | Manal | Μανουάλι | Candle | Church candle |
| Ναίκα | Néca | Γυναίκα | Woman | Simplification. Omission of initial syllable "Gy" |
| Νεκκλησιά | Νeclischá | Στην Εκκλησία | Church | Reanalysis: the final nasal was misinterpreted to be constituent to the noun rather than the preposition/article and entered the morphology |
| Πισίκα | Pischíca | Πιτσιρίκα (Κορίτσι) | Fem. child | From Byzantine pitsiricon>N. Italic piccër (small)+Byzantine ίκο (ico). Cf. Modern Italian "piccolo" (small). |
| Παιί | Peí | Παιδί | Child | Simplification. Omission of Greek delta "d". See also "Fschách" for child. |
| Παλκάρ | Palcár | Παλικάρι | Mask. child | A brave person (mask). From Byzantine pallecarion (young follower of soldiers) > Hellenistic pallicarion> derived from pallak (follower)+arion (young)> Archaic Greek (attic) pallax (πάλλαξ). |
| Στράδα | Stradha | Δρόμος | Street, road | From Italian->Byzantine->Misthiotica. |
| Τσερί | Tscherí | Κερί | Candle | Sound alteration of initial "K"->Tsch |
| Τεμέλ | Temel | Θεμέλια | Foundation | Θ->T |
| Τύρα | Tíra | Θύρα | Door | From Archaic Greek->Byzantine->Misthiotica, Θ->T |
| Φ'σάχ | Fschách | Παιδί | Child | Possibly derived from the word "σπλάχνο" meaning gut, wound, religiously denoting "child"->Byzantine. |
| Φραίδα | Fraída | Σφραγίδα | Stamp | Simplification. Omission of initial "s" and middle (voiceless) "g". |
| Φτείρια | Ftíria | Ψείρες | Louse | Sound alteration PST->FT and gender alteration from feminine to neuter. |
| Χεγός | Cheyos | Θεός | God | Palatalisation of Θ->Χ, epenthesis of "g" to avoid hiatus between "e" and "o". (This epenthesis resembles the use of yumuşak ge in Turkish.) |
Other categories
| Ιτό | Itó | Αυτό | This, that | |
| Μι | Mi | Με | With | Vowel change E->I |

=== Misthiotic gastronomy ===
- Pitoulica [aka Mantiz] is a yoghurt-based soup with pasta and olive-oil croutons. There are variations where fried garlic sometimes adds to the distinctive character of the dish. Another version of Mantiz (from other places of Asia Minor) is a kind of pasta with minced meat, like tortellini, served with tomato sauce with yogurt and paprika (chilli pepper powder).
- Toundouri (tandouri) bread is bread baked in the ground-based oven known as toundouri. The toundouri is also found in numerous other cultures. Some examples are the Indian cuisine, the Middle East cuisine as well as in regional Turkish cuisines.
- Arjalou fai is a soup made of yoghurt and pligouri (cracked wheat).
- Gilindiria is a kind of soup with little balls of pasta made of pligouri (cracked wheat) and flour, and boukovo (chili pepper).
- Goultsigalat fai is a kind of soup with milk and pligouti (cracked wheat).
- Xovota avga (eggs) are fried eggs in boiled water instead of butter or olive-oil.
- Pintoush is a cream made of eggs, milk, flour and pligouri (cracked wheat) and it's like béchamel cream.
- Sougkatous is an omelet with eggs, milk and flour.

=== Cultural indicators of the inhabitants' ancient/Byzantine origin ===
- The language (Misthiotica) (archaic elements/Byzantine elements)
- Retained names used by the Misthiotes of older settlements, i.e. the nearby villages Nasrados (Tr. Ulağaç, [Ulagatsch], Nakroin (Tr. Kıçağaç, [Kitschagatsch]), the nearby sites Parapedissos, Nedissos, Maskados, Apsala.
- The design of their garments and footwear had a Byzantine origin (differing from the surrounding Turkish).
- Seasonal games took place in Misthi originating in ancient times such as wrestling, the Vara-Vara dance and polo on horseback (a 'sport' dating back to Alexandrian times and to the interaction of that army with people they met in today's Afghanistan).
- Marriage: The dressing of the groom calls to mind the robings of the Bishop which derived from Byzantium.
- A dying individual (often referred to men) was obliged to provide death duties in order to receive forgiveness and gain admission to Hades.
- There was a general belief, originating from Byzantine times, that the soul of a man was taken by the Archangel Michael using his sword. For this reason all water was thrown out of the house as the Archangel was believed to have washed his sword with it (bad omen to use the water).
- In accordance to ancient traditions, the stars and planets were consulted to give the propitious time to leave for work or travel. The moon and the sun were personified as brothers traveling in the sky, the one in daytime and the other at night. Their eclipse caused anxiety to men, and they tried, with they magic means to relieve these two heavenly bodies from the demon that had sieged them, this being the explanation of an eclipse.
- Misthiotes believed that earthquakes were caused by the movement of the world from one bull's horn to the other - because they believed that the world rested upon the horns of a bull. Magic ceremonies for instance accompanied the litany for the invocation of rain. These beliefs date back not only to Byzantine times but to ancient times as well.

=== Names of the inhabitants ===
- Below is a comprehensive list of names used by the inhabitants (Kostakis, 1977). The first column shows the Greek name, the second a transcription, the third the English equivalent, and the fourth (unfinished yet) the Modern Greek version.

Misthiotic male names

Misthiotic

- Αβεργάμης
- Αζαρίας
- Αλέκος
- Αλέξης
- Ανανίας
- Αναστάσης
- Ανέστης
- Αντρής
- Αντρίκος
- Αντών (ης)
- Απόστιλης
- Αχανάς
- Βασίλ
- Βενέτης
- Βετσή
- Βλάσης
- Γαβραήλ
- Γαραλέμης ή Χαραλέμης
- Γιάκωβος ή Γιακώφ
- Γιορντάνης
- Γιοφχάν (ης) ή Χιοφχάν (ης)
- Γεσήφης
- Γιωβάννης
- Γιωνάς
- Γουργόρης
- Γούτος
- Γιώρ ή Γιωρίκας
- Ερεμίας
- Κλήμιντης
- Κωσταΐνης ή Κωσταής
- Λάζαρης
- Λευτέρης
- Λεωνίδας
- Μακάριος
- Μανόλης
- Μελέτης
- Μεργκούλης
- Μάρκος
- Μηνάς
- Μουσαήλης
- Μουϋσής
- Μουχάλ ή Μουχαήλ
- Μπο(υ)ντής
- Νικόλας
- Νταμιανές ή Νταμιανής
- Νταναήλ
- Ντηρμήτ (ης)
- Παναϊώτ
- Παντελές
- Παραής
- Παυλής
- Πετρής
- Πρόιμο ή Ποπότσης
- Ροφαήλ
- Σάββας
- Σπύρης
- Σταυρής
- Συμοχός
- Τζηγλόρης ή Τζηλγόρης
- Τόγωρης
- Τσερεκάς ή Τσερετσής
- Τρύβιντης
- Τσύριλλης
- Φιλ΄ππους
- Φτύμ
- Χαρίτας
- Χεγοντός
- Χιμιάνες
- Χρυστόστομα
- Χρίστης ή Χούτος

Transcription

- Averyámis
- Azarías
- Alécos
- Aléxis
- Ananías
- Anastásis
- Anéstis
- Andrís
- Andrícos
- Andón(is)
- Apóstilis
- Achanásch
- Vaschíl
- Venétis
- Betschís
- Vláschis
- Yavraíl
- Yarelémis and Charelémis
- Iácovos and Iacóf
- Iordánis
- Yiofchán(is) and Chiofchán(is)
- Yeschífis
- Yiovánnis
- Yonás
- Yuryóris
- Yútos
- Yiór and Yioríca
- Eremías
- Clémindis
- Costaínis and Costaís
- Lázaris
- Leftéris
- Leonídas
- Makários
- Manólis
- Melétis
- Mergúlis
- Márcos
- Minás
- Musaílis
- Muisís
- Muchál and Muchaíl
- Bo(i)dís
- Nicólas
- Damianés and Damianís
- Danaíl
- Dirmít(is)
- Panayiót
- Pandelés
- Paraís
- Pavlís
- Petrís
- Próimo and Popótsis
- Rofaíl
- Sávvas
- Spirís
- Stavrís
- Schimochós
- Tziylóris and Tzilyóris
- Tóyoris
- Tscherecás and Tscheretschís
- Trivídis
- Tschírilis
- Fílpus
- Ftím
- Charítas
- Cheyodósch
- Chimianés
- Christostóma
- Chrstístis and Chútos

English

- Abraham
- Azarias
- Alex
- Alex
- Ananias
- Anastasius
- Anestes
- Andrew
- -
- Anthony
- Apostolus
- Achanias
- Basil
- Benett
- Joachim
- Basil
- Gabriel
- Charalampus
- Jacob
- Jordan
- Theophanes
- Joseph
- John
- Jonas
- Gregory
- Chrysostomus
- George
- Jeremy
- Clemence
- Constantine
- Lazarus
- Elefterius
- Leonidas
- Macarius
- Emanuel
- Meletus
- Mercury, Mercurius
- Marcus
- Menas
- Michael
- Moses
- Michael
- Prodromus
- Nicholas
- Damian
- Daniel
- Demetre
- Panayiot
- Pandeles
- Parascevius
- Paul
- Peter
- Primo, Prodromus
- Raphael
- Sebastian
- Spiritus
- Staurus
- Simonn
- Gregory
- Theodore
- Kiriakos or Sal(vatore) (Latin)
- Tryphon
- Cyril
- Philip
- Eutheme
- Charitas
- Theodosius
- Damian
- Chrysostomus
- Chris, Christian

Modern Greek

- Averyámis

Compare with Greek-Cappadocian names from the Old Testament

GREEK

- Αβραάμ [Avraám]
- Ανανίας [Ananías]
- Δανιήλ [Daniíl]
- Δαυίδ [Davídh]
- Δαυίδα [Davídha]
- Ελισάβετ [Elisávet]
- Ζαχαρίας [Zacharías]
- Ηλίας [Elías]
- Ιερεμίας [Ieremías]
- Ιωσήφ [Iosíf]
- Μωυσής [Moisís]
- Ναούμ [Naúm]
- Ραχήλ [Rachíl]
- Ρεβέκκα [Revéca]
- Σαμουήλ [Samuíl]
- Σολομών [Solomón]
- Σουσάννα ή Σουζάννα Susánna or Suzánna

TURKISH

- Avram
- Anania
- Danil
- Tavid
- Tavida
- Elish or Elisho
- Zahari
- Ilias
- -
- Yusuf
- Moyisa
- Naum
- Irahil
- Reveca
- Samuil
- Schlom or Scholom
- Susa and Sona

ENGLISH

- Abraham
- Anania
- Daniel
- David
- -
- Elizabeth
- Zachary
- Elias
- Jeremy
- Joseph
- Moses
- Naum
- Rachel
- Rebecca
- Samuel
- Solomon
- Susanna or Suzanna

== Surnames ==
Surnames were seldom used in the sense we know of today. Misthiotes referred to one another on a first name basis (a very common procedure during the Ottoman era for all Ottoman population). To separate between persons with similar or equal names they used patronymes or toponyms, i.e. names from places of origin. For instance "Daniil dou Yaserli" [Δανιήλ dου Γάσερλη], Daniel the Caesarian's / Daniel Caesarian's son. Such surnames became through transformation unrecognizable to the holders. The Yaserli surname for instance was originally in Greek (and Latin) Caesarius/Kaisarios [Καισάριος or plural Καισάριοι], denoting a person from Caesaria (Kayseri). With the influx of Turkish, the name went through a transformation process that rendered it adaptable to the Turkish equivalent Kaiserli (from Kayseri and the suffix 'li' denoting belonging). Usually an initial 'K' in Byzantine Greek was transformed in the Misthiotica dialect either as "ch" or "Y". In this case it was transformed as "Y". When the bearers of the name entered the port of Mersina from where they were taken by boat to Piraeus, Athens, their name were written in Turkish as "Kaiserli". Entering Piraeus the Greek authorities "re-Hellenised" their name by adding a common Greek surname suffix "-(i)dis" and once again transformed the surname into its current form "Kaiserlidis". Some members continued however to pronounce the name "Yaserli", and due to the civil war that broke out in Greece following WWII with the loss of the village archives, they were recorded as "Gaserli" or "Gaserlidis" [Γάσερλη, Γασερλίδης] during their entrance to Greek army service.

== Facts ==
- The international academic community of linguists considered Misthiotica and other Cappadocian-Greek languages to be extinct until recently when researchers discovered speakers of the language in Greece. (Studies are currently in progress of both linguistic as well as social character).
- Many Misthiotes left Misthi to establish themselves as traders in the United States of America and in Russia. Travels to Russia was usually a collective endeavour of 20-30 persons and took normally about 20–25 days. The Misthiotes would spend 2–3 years if not longer before returning home when another group would leave to the same destination.
- Many of the surnames of Misthiotes of today are of Turkish origin while some are just transliterations of Byzantine names. Many of the surnames of Turkish origin could be classified as having a derogatory meaning. For instance, Sismanides - 'sisman' meaning fat, or most commonly Delioglou - ('deli'=idiot) meaning the idiot's son. Only few of the first generation Misthiotes in Greece have understood the meaning of their surnames. These surnames were often given by the Turkish authorities. Numerous accounts show that Misthiotes would not recognise themselves by these names as they referred to themselves either only by their first name or by the first name followed by a patronyme and/or a name of the city of origin. The completely different level of literacy of the second and third generation has however spurred an interest of the subject and subsequently several name changing processes.
- Many of the second generation of the Misthiotes from Greece emigrated during the late 1960s from Greece to northern European countries such as Germany, Belgium, and Sweden but also to Australia and the US making Greece only a temporary place of stay along their history.

== See also ==
- Cappadocian Greek

== Resources on Misthi and Cappadocia ==
- Kappadokes.gr General information on Greek Cappadocia by the Greek Cappadocean Federation
- Cappadocia.gr General information on Greek Cappadocia
- Misti.gr Information on Misthi provided by Misthiotes from Neo Agioneri, Kilkis
- Cappadocian Greek Information from Wikipedia by Prof. Mark Janse on the Cappadocian Greek language
