= Gavoustema =

Annual meeting of Cappadocian Greeks

Gavoustema (Greek: Γαβούστημα) is the Annual Panhellenic Meeting of the Misthiotes, descendants of the inhabitants of Misthi (Cappadocia, today Turkey), in Greece. The Misthiotes refers to a group of Greek-Cappadocian people who came to Greece after the population exchange between Greece and Turkey following the Treaty of Lausanne in 1923. Having established themselves in their new homeland of Greece the organizing committees of these descendants agreed by the end of the 1990s to arrange an annual meeting to celebrate and promote their culture. The first Annual Panhellenic Meeting was held in Mandra, Larissa (Greece) in 1997. These meetings have since then been arranged at different locations in Greece where Misthiotes (and those related to them) settled down. In reality, the Annual Panhellenic Meeting is a cultural festival with activities ranging from art, music and dance exhibitions, academic lectures (often concerning history), gastronomical tours as well as book exposition. This event has proven highly successful in many respects and has attracted more than 3000 every year. In many cases, families have found relatives they did not exist which has resulted in the illumination of their ancestry. The Gavoustema has also led to the resurrection of the Misthiotic culture which to many, especially to younger generations, has been completely unknown. As a result, the Gavoustema has spurred several individuals to engage in layman investigations or professional academic research about the history, culture and language of the Misthiotes.

The Gavoustema has been hosted by the following cities in Greece:

- 1997 - Mandra, Larissa (August)
- 1998 - Xanthe (August)
- 1999 - Conitsa, Ioannena (August)
- 2000 - Kokkinochoma, Kavala (August)
- 2001 - Ano Mavrolofo, Magnesia (17-19 August)
- 2002 - Xerochori, Salonica (23-24 August)
- 2003 - Neo Agioneri, Kilkis (22-24 August)
- 2004 - Alexandroupolis (6-8 August)
- 2005 - Mandra, Larissa (19-21 August)
- 2006 - Kavala (August). Guest lecture was given by prominent professor of Linguistics and Classics Mark Janse who has focused his research on Cappadocian Greek dialects. Visit Professor Mark Janse's homepage.)
- 2008 - Plagia, Kilkis (16-17 August)
- 2009 - Eleftheroupolis, Kavala (date)
- 2010 - Alexandroupolis (date)
- 2011 - Neos Mylotopos, Pella (19-21 August)
- 2012 - Neo Agioneri, Kilkis (24-26 August)
- 2013 - Neokesaria, Ioannina (23-25 August)
- 2014 - Petrana, Kozani (22-23 August)
- 2015 - Vounena, Larissa (21-23 August)

== See also ==
- Misthi: Greek city in Cappadocia (nowadays Turkey)
