= Mandra, Larissa =

Mandra Μάνδρα
- Community
- Location within Greece
- Coordinates: 39°36′58″N 22°15′43″E
- Country: Greece
- Administrative region: Thessaly
- Regional unit: Larissa
- Municipality: Larissa
- Municipal unit: Koilada

Population (2021)
  - Community: 419
- Time zone: UTC+2 (EET)
  - Summer (DST): UTC+3 (EEST)

Mandra (Greek: Μάνδρα) is a village 14 km west of Larissa, Greece. Inhabited by Misthiotes deriving from the Greek city of Misthi south of Caesarea (Kayseri).
