= Sille, Konya =

Sille
- Neighbourhood
- A general view of the town of Sille

- Location within Turkey Location within Turkey Central Anatolia
- Coordinates: 37°55′35″N 32°25′0″E
- Country: Turkey
- Province: Konya
- District: Selçuklu
- Population (2022): 1,191
- Time zone: UTC+3 (TRT)
- Area code: 0332

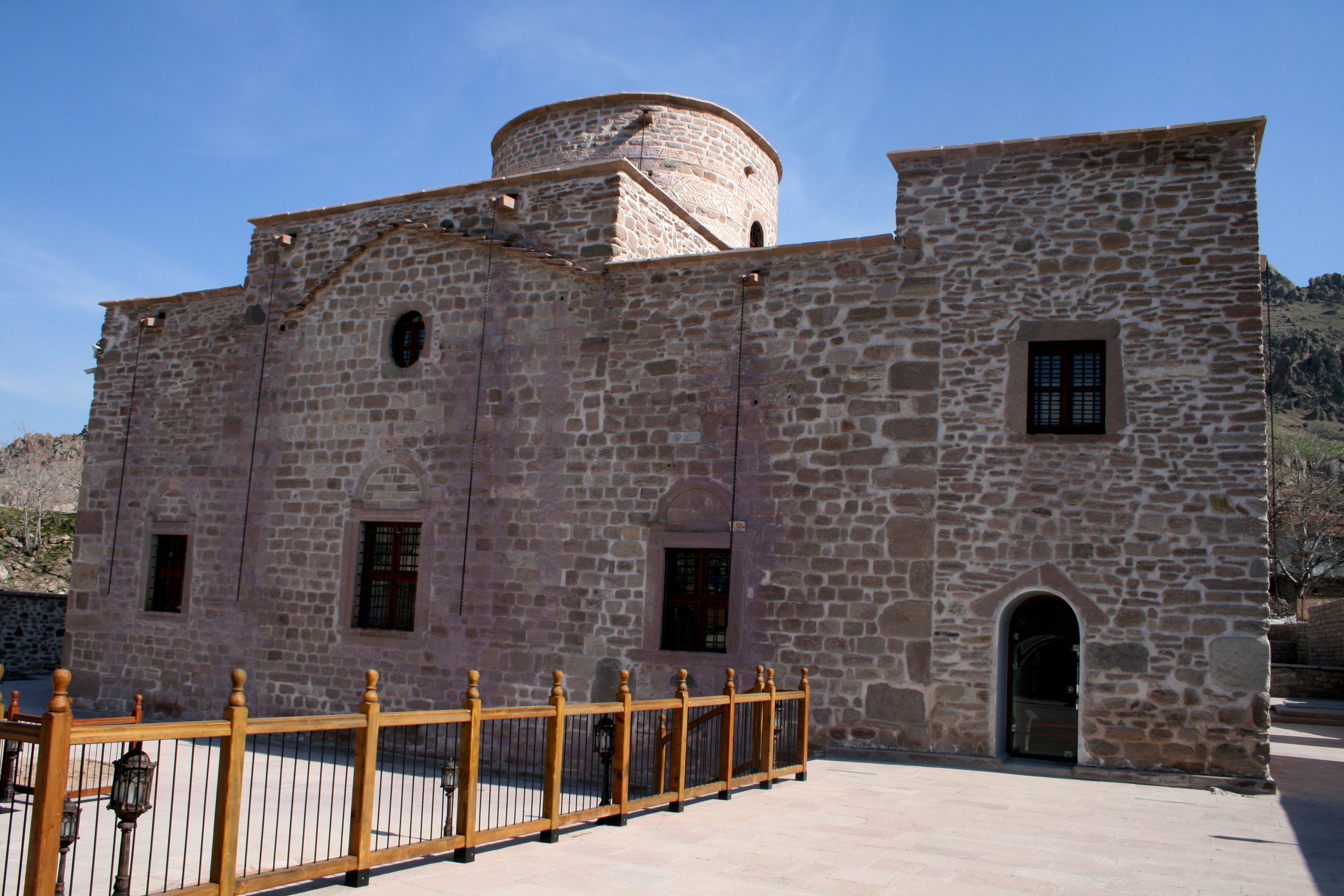
The former Greek Orthodox church of Archangelos Michael, known as the Hagia Eleni Church, founded by Saint Helen.

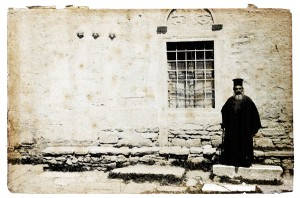
The priest and the three lion heads, in front of the church of Archangelos Michael

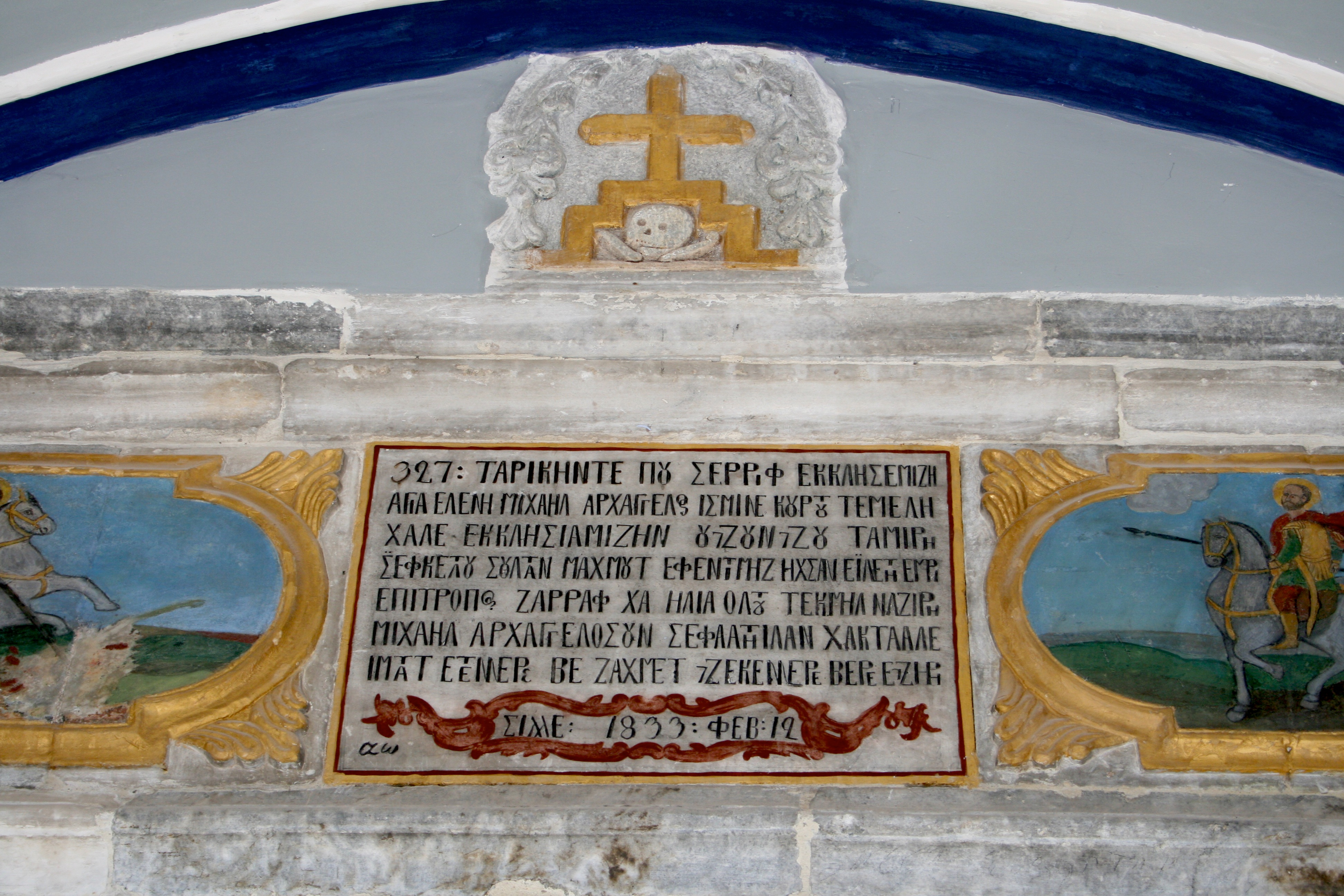
The inscription in Karamanli Turkish on the entrance of the former Greek Orthodox church of Archangelos Michael.

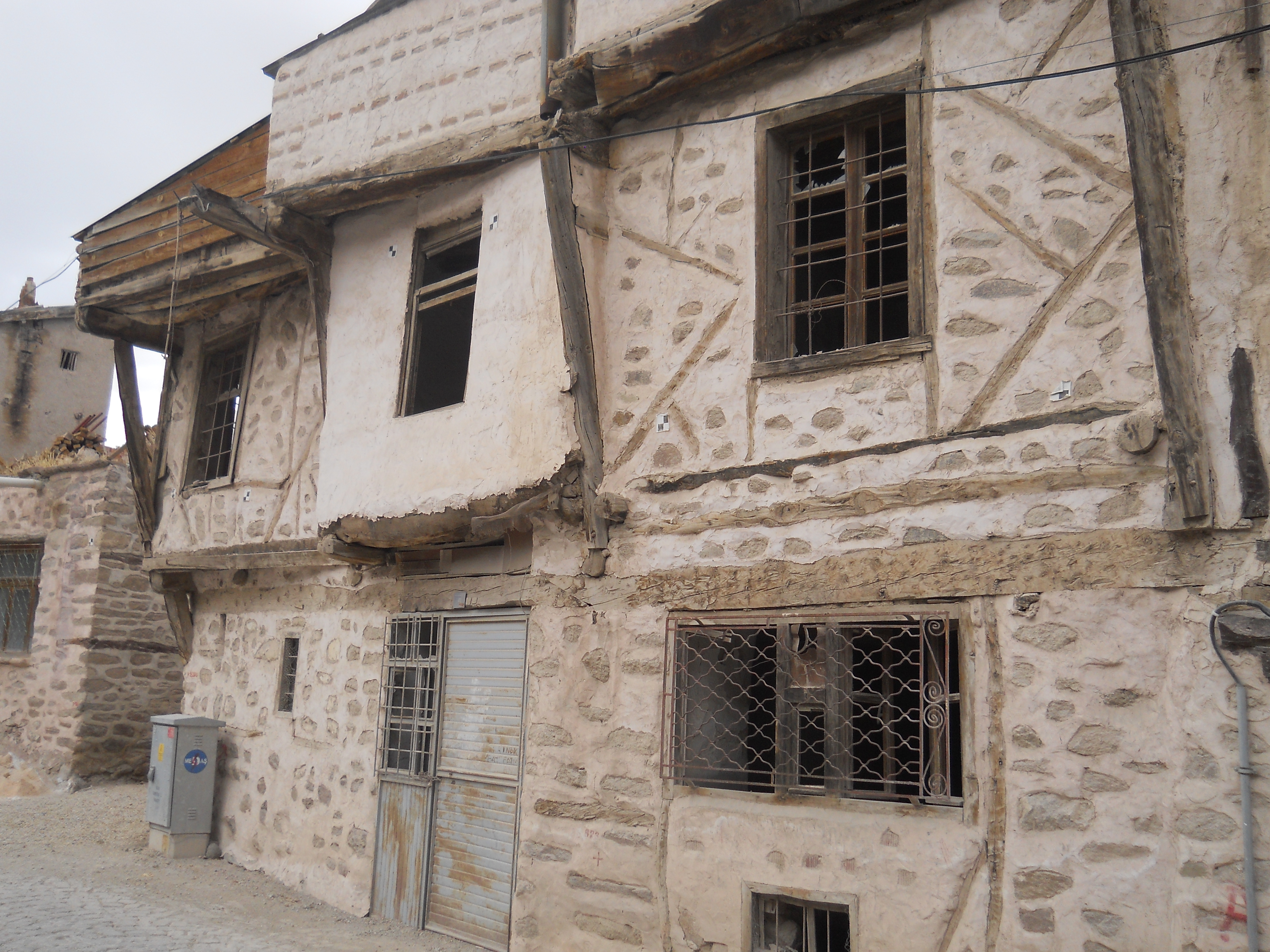
A historical house in Sille

Sille, also known as Sille Subaşı and historically Sylata, is a neighbourhood of the municipality and district of Selçuklu, Konya Province, Turkey. Its population is 1,191 (2022).

Sille Subaşı was one of the few villages where the Cappadocian Greek language was spoken until 1922. It was inhabited by Greeks who had been living there in peaceful coexistence with the nearby Turks of Konya for over 800 years.

The reason for this peaceful coexistence was Jalal al-Din Muhammad Rumi, who was the witness of a miracle that happened at the nearby Orthodox Christian monastery of Saint Chariton.

In the nineteenth and twentieth centuries there were three churches and a small mosque within the monastic complex. The Christians of the monastery reported a legend according to which the mosque was built by the Muslims in honor of St. Chariton when he saved Rumi’s son from a death fall in the hills surrounding the monastery. This miracle was celebrated, prior to World War I, by an annual gift of oil from the dervishes to the monastery. The leader of the Mawlawis spent one night each year in prayer at this mosque.

In the Turkish language the monastery is now called Akmanastir and is translated as, "White Monastery". Jalal al-Din Rumi constructed a small mosque inside the Saint Chariton monastery. It is also notable that Jalal al-Din Rumi wrote Greek poems using the Arabic-Turkish script, while Greek Sille villagers wrote Turkish using the Greek alphabet scripting. This form of writing spread across the region and was commonly known as Karamanli Turkish writing.

Mevlana asked the Turks never to hurt the Greeks of the village, and assigned to the Greek villagers the task of cleaning his own tomb. The Turks respected his commandment. In turbulent times, several firmans from the Sultan were sent to Konya Turks, which reminded them of their promise not to hurt the Sille villagers. The coexistence of Sille Greeks with the nearby Turks remained peaceful, which is why the villagers managed to preserve for over eight centuries both their native Greek language and their Orthodox Christian religion.

In the population exchanges between Greece and Turkey (1923), Turkey and Greece expelled their respective Christian and Muslim populations to the other. After 1924, all Greeks had left the village. The majority of this population relocated to the Nea Silata village in Chalkidiki, Greece.

Currently, the village is protected and renovation efforts were conducted for preservation and touristic purposes.
