= Mark Janse =

Dutch linguist (born 1959)

Mark Janse (born 31 August 1959 in Sas van Gent, The Netherlands) is Dutch research professor in Asia Minor and Ancient Greek at Ghent University. He is honorary consul of Greece for the Flemish region of Belgium.

== Biography ==
Janse studied classics, Hebrew and linguistics at Ghent University.

Janse was professor of linguistics and classics and head of the Department of Arts & Humanities at University College Roosevelt, an international honours college of Utrecht University (2004–2008). He is a former visiting fellow of the University of Amsterdam (2002–2004), All Souls College in Oxford (2007 & 2014), the Onassis Foundation in Greece (2008 & 2013) and the Center for Hellenic Studies of Harvard University (2013–2014), a visiting professor at Ghent University (1996–2004), the University of Amsterdam (2003), Ohio State University (2004) and the University of Patras (2006–2009), and an Onassis Senior Visiting Scholar at Harvard University, the University of Arizona, Stanford University and Princeton University (2012). He is a research associate of the ESRC Centre for Research on Bilingualism at Bangor University (since 2008) and CHS Associate in Greek Linguistics of the Center for Hellenic Studies of Harvard University (since 2017).

Janse has been editor of Linguistic Bibliography (1982–2004).

In June 2005, Mark Janse and Dimitris Papazachariou from the University of Patras discovered native speakers of Cappadocian Greek, a Greek-Turkish mixed language believed to have died out in the 1960s.
