= A24 motorway (Greece) =

Road in Greece

A24 expressway
- Αυτοκινητόδρομος Α24
- Route of the A24 and A242 expressways, and Nea Diagonios, in blue
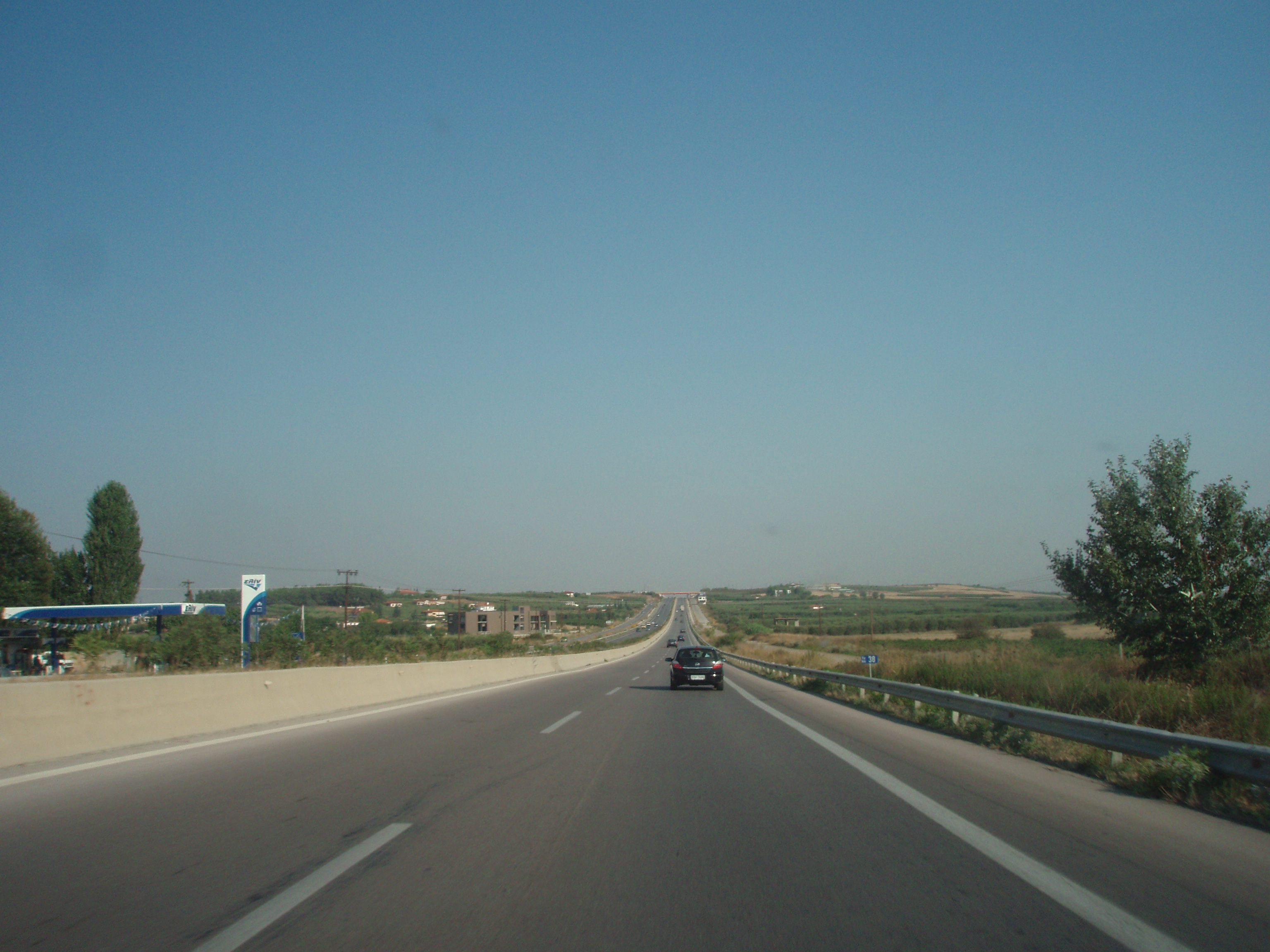
- The A24 near Nea Kallikrateia

Major junctions
- North end: Thessaloniki (Efkarpia, A2)
- South end: Nea Moudania

Location
- Country: Greece
- Regions: Central Macedonia
- Primary destinations: Thessaloniki (Efkarpia); Nea Moudania

Highway system
- Highways in Greece; Motorways; National roads
← A23	→ A242

The A24 motorway is a partial controlled-access highway and limited-access road in northern Greece. The A24 runs from Thessaloniki to Nea Moudania, starting as a short motorway spur from the A2 Egnatia Odos motorway to the junction with the Thessaloniki Inner Ring Road at the neighbourhood of Efkarpia: the A24 continues as a limited-access expressway, following the Inner Ring Road towards Kalamaria, before turning off south towards Nea Moudania and Kallithea on the Chalkidiki peninsula.

== Exit list ==
The exits of the A24 motorway:

Regional unit	Exit	Name	Destinations	Notes
Thessaloniki	23-K4	Efkarpia interchange	A2 motorway (Greece)	Northern terminus of the A24
Thessaloniki	K5	Efkarpia	(cont. Inner Ring Road)	begin of common section with the Thessaloniki Inner Ring Road
Thessaloniki	K6	Polichni		¦
Thessaloniki	K7	Kastra		¦
Thessaloniki	K7A	Agios Pavlos		¦
Thessaloniki	K8	Triandria		¦
Thessaloniki	K9	Ano Toumpa		¦
Thessaloniki	K10	Pylaia/Malakopi		¦
Thessaloniki	K11	Pylaia/Panorama		¦
Thessaloniki	K12	Kalamaria interchange	(cont. Inner Ring Road)	end of common section with the Thessaloniki Inner Ring Road
Thessaloniki		Foinikas/American Farm School		
Thessaloniki		Foinikas		
Thessaloniki		Thermi	Greek National Road 16	
Thessaloniki		Thessaloniki Airport	Greek National Road 67	
Thessaloniki		Tagarades		
Thessaloniki		Kardia		
Thessaloniki		Kato Scholari		
Thessaloniki		Mesimeri		
Chalkidiki		Nea Kallikrateia		
Chalkidiki		Sozopoli		
Chalkidiki		Nea Triglia		
Chalkidiki		Flogita		
Chalkidiki		Portaria		
Chalkidiki		Nea Moudania north		
Chalkidiki		Nea Moudania east / Sithonia / Polygyros		
Chalkidiki		Nea Poteidaia		
Chalkidiki		Nea Fokea		
Chalkidiki		Kallithea / Kassandra		Southern terminus of A24

== Branches ==
=== A242 expressway ===
The A242 expressway is a short spur that connects the A24 with the EO67 road (at coordinates 40.5329°N 22.9940°E), towards the passenger entrance of Thessaloniki Airport (as opposed to the Hellenic Air Force entrance that the EO67 serves): the spur is about 1.51 kilometres (0.94 miles) long, and was defined by Ministerial Decision DOY/oik/5776 of 4 December 2015. The road is one of three A-prefix roads in Greece that are entirely an expressway – the others being the A21 in Evros and the A23 in Rhodope.

=== Nea Diagonios ===
Nea Diagonios (Greek: Νέα Διαγώνιος) is an unnumbered national road in central and southern Thessaloniki: it used to run between Thessaloniki and Nea Moudania, before the A24 took over the section south of Foinikas. Today, Nea Diagonios is about 8.35 kilometres (5.19 miles) long, and runs between Dimokratias Square in the city centre and junction 12 of the Thessaloniki Inner Ring Road near Foinikas, following the Egnatia and Konstantinou Karamanli streets.

Nea Diagonios was created by Ministerial Decision DMEO/e/O/1308 of 15 December 1995, and was numbered the EO105γ for statistical purposes by the National Statistical Service of Greece (ESYE) in 1998.

== Gallery ==
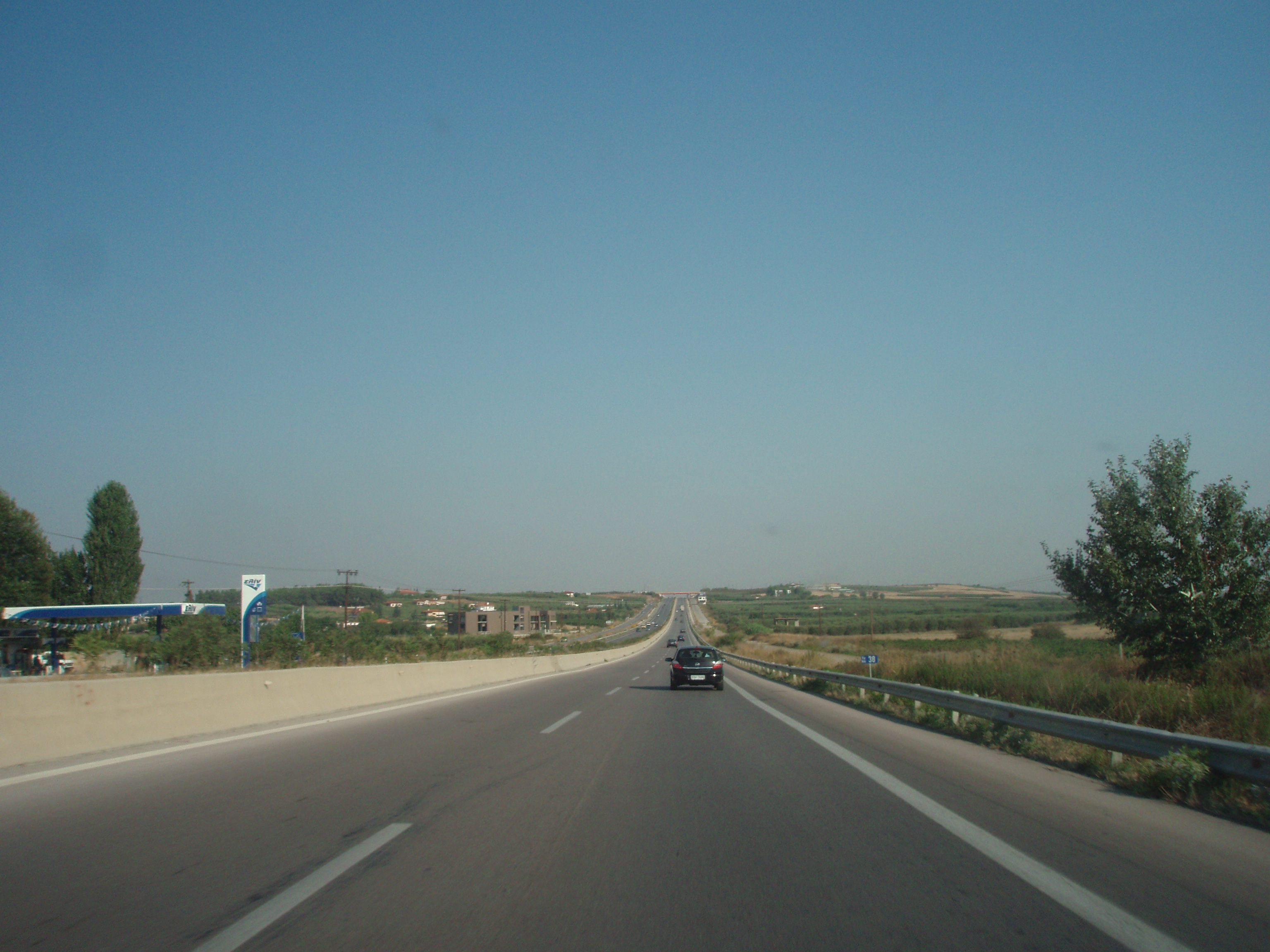
A24 Motorway near Nea Kallikratia
