= Agios Mamas, Chalkidiki =

Agios Mamas Άγιος Μάμας
- Community
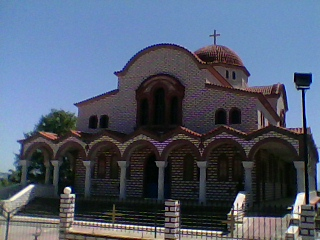
- Agios Mamas Church

- Location within Greece
- Coordinates: 40°15′N 23°21′E
- Country: Greece
- Administrative region: Central Macedonia
- Regional unit: Chalkidiki
- Municipality: Nea Propontida
- Municipal unit: Moudania
- Elevation: 14 m (46 ft)

Population (2021)
  - Community: 1,093
- Time zone: UTC+2 (EET)
  - Summer (DST): UTC+3 (EEST)
- Postal code: 632 00
- Area code: +30 23730
- Vehicle registration: ΧΚ

Agios Mamas (Greek: ΄Αγιος Μάμας [ˈaʝios ˈmamas]) is a village in the Chalkidiki peninsula in northern Greece. It is in the municipal unit of Moudania, within the Municipality of Nea Propontida.

== Location ==
It is located on the gulf of Torone, 3 km from the beach (Papa Aloni), between the two fingers (smaller peninsulas) of Kassandra and Sithonia, 68 km southeast of Thessaloniki and 9 km east of Nea Moudania.

== Economy ==
It is famous for its trade fair in the first days of September commemorating its patron saint Saint Mamas on 2 September.

The inhabitants are involved in olive farming for green table olives and olive oil as the rest of the villages of the area Olynthus, Kalyves Polygyrou and Yerakini.

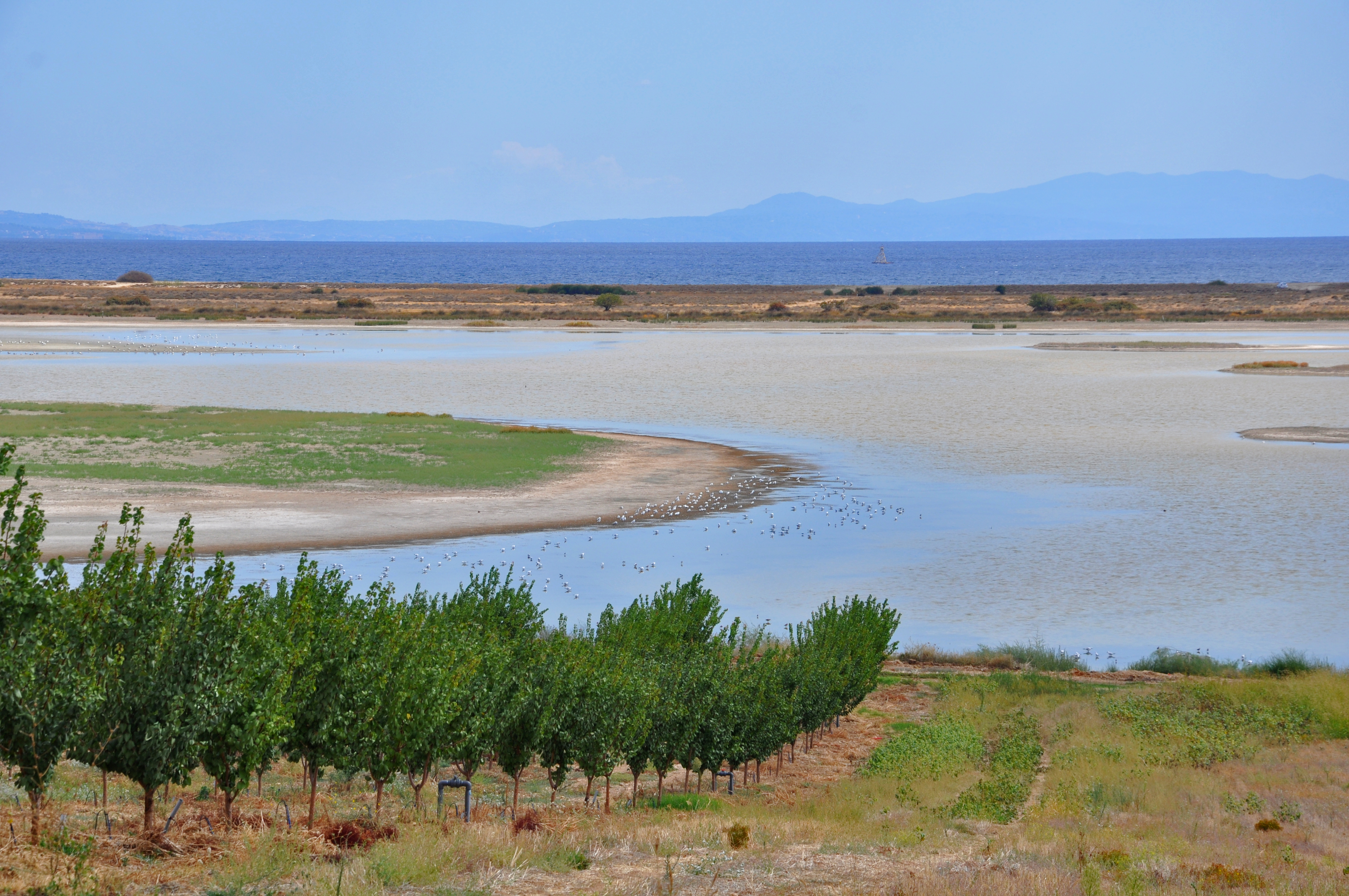
Agios Mamas lagoon

Its seaside is the continuation of Kalyves Polygyrou's with a very long sandy beach, after the river Olynthios delta, including Papa Aloni beach and Portes before Nea Potidea.

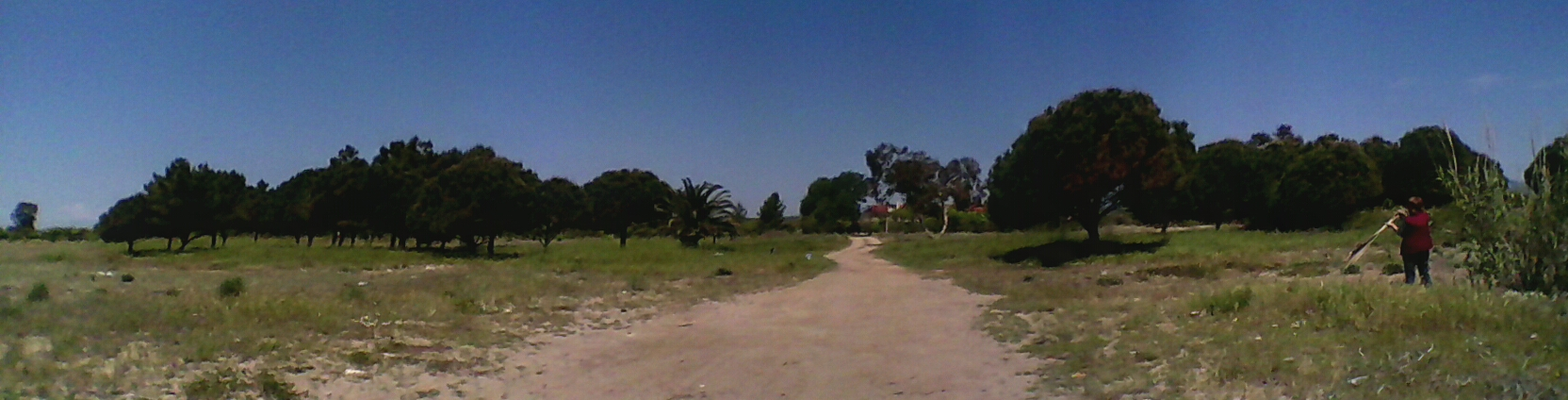
A part of the seaside

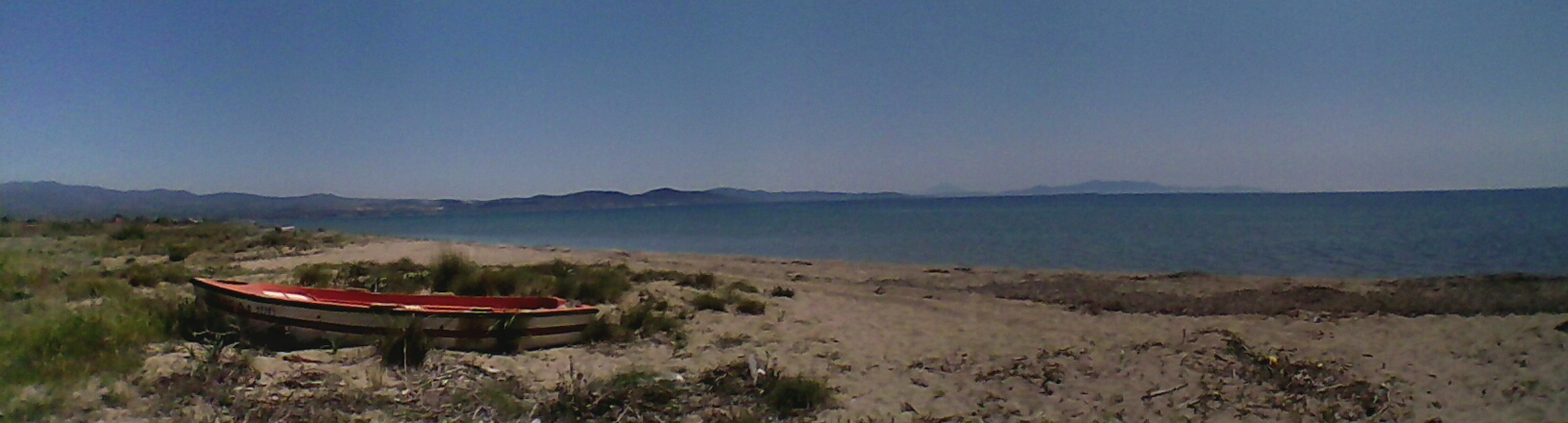
Eastern part of beach skyline
