= Kalchas =

Kalchas can refer to:

- Calchas, a seer in Greek mythology
- Kalchas, Pakistan, a town in Pakistan
- Kalchas, Rhodope, a village in Greece
- 4138 Kalchas, an asteroid
