= List of highways numbered 21 =

For roads named A21, see List of A21 roads
Route 21, or Highway 21, can refer to:

== International ==
- E21 European route E21

== Australia ==
- Chandler Highway
- Toowoomba Connection Road (QLD)
- – Kakadu Highway

== Austria ==
- Wiener Außenring Autobahn

== Cambodia ==
- National Road 21 (Cambodia)

== Canada ==
- Alberta Highway 21
- British Columbia Highway 21
- Manitoba Highway 21
- Newfoundland and Labrador Route 21
- Ontario Highway 21
- Prince Edward Island Route 21
- Saskatchewan Highway 21

== Costa Rica ==
- National Route 21

== Cuba ==
- Highway 6–21
- Highway 4–21 (former)

== Czech Republic ==
- I/21 Highway; Czech: Silnice I/21

== Greece ==
- A21 expressway, a limited-access road from Provatonas to Mandra
- EO21 road

== Hungary ==
- Main road 21 (Hungary)

== India ==
- National Highway 21 (India)

== Iran ==
- Road 21
- Freeway 21

== Ireland ==
- N21 road (Ireland)

== Italy ==
- Autostrada A21

== Japan ==
- Japan National Route 21

== Korea, South ==
- National Route 21

== Malaysia ==
- Kajang–Seremban Highway
- FT 21 Malaysia Federal Route 21

== Moldova ==
- M21 highway (Moldova)

== New Zealand ==
- New Zealand State Highway 21

== Paraguay ==
- National Route 21

== Turkey ==
- O-21, a motorway in Turkey running from Kemerhisar, Niğde Province to Tarsus, Mersin Province.

== United Kingdom ==
- British A21 (Hastings-London)
- A21 road (Northern Ireland)

== United States ==
- U.S. Route 21
- Alabama State Route 21
- Arkansas Highway 21
  - Arkansas Highway 21E (former)
  - Arkansas Highway 21W (former)
- California State Route 21 (former)
  - County Route A21 (California)
  - County Route E21 (California)
  - County Route G21 (California)
  - County Route J21 (California)
  - County Route S21 (California)
- Colorado State Highway 21
- Connecticut Route 21
- Florida State Road 21
  - County Road 21B (Clay County, Florida)
  - County Road 21B (Duval County, Florida)
  - County Road 21D (Duval County, Florida)
  - County Road 21 (Marion County, Florida)
  - County Road 21 (Putnam County, Florida)
- Georgia State Route 21
- Hawaii Route 21 (former)
- Idaho State Highway 21
- Illinois Route 21
- Indiana State Road 21 (former)
- Iowa Highway 21
- Kentucky Route 21
- Louisiana Highway 21
- Maryland Route 21
- Massachusetts Route 21
- M-21 (Michigan highway)
- Minnesota State Highway 21
  - County Road 21 (Anoka County, Minnesota)
  - County Road 21 (Hennepin County, Minnesota)
  - County Road 21 (Scott County, Minnesota)
- Mississippi Highway 21
- Missouri Route 21
- Montana Highway 21
- Nebraska Highway 21
  - Nebraska Spur 21B
  - Nebraska Spur 21C
- Nevada State Route 21 (former)
- New Jersey Route 21
  - County Route C21 (Bergen County, New Jersey)
  - County Route 21 (Monmouth County, New Jersey)
- New Mexico State Road 21
- New York State Route 21
  - County Route 21 (Allegany County, New York)
  - County Route 21 (Chautauqua County, New York)
  - County Route 21 (Columbia County, New York)
    - County Route 21B (Columbia County, New York)
    - County Route 21C (Columbia County, New York)
  - County Route 21 (Delaware County, New York)
  - County Route 21 (Dutchess County, New York)
  - County Route 21 (Erie County, New York)
  - County Route 21 (Essex County, New York)
  - County Route 21 (Genesee County, New York)
  - County Route 21 (Hamilton County, New York)
  - County Route 21 (Herkimer County, New York)
  - County Route 21 (Lewis County, New York)
  - County Route 21 (Oneida County, New York)
  - County Route 21 (Ontario County, New York)
  - County Route 21 (Orange County, New York)
  - County Route 21 (Oswego County, New York)
  - County Route 21 (Otsego County, New York)
  - County Route 21 (Putnam County, New York)
  - County Route 21 (Rensselaer County, New York)
  - County Route 21 (Saratoga County, New York)
  - County Route 21 (Schoharie County, New York)
  - County Route 21 (Suffolk County, New York)
  - County Route 21 (Sullivan County, New York)
  - County Route 21 (Ulster County, New York)
  - County Route 21 (Washington County, New York)
  - County Route 21 (Westchester County, New York)
  - County Route 21 (Wyoming County, New York)
  - County Route 21 (Yates County, New York)
- North Carolina Highway 21 (former)
- North Dakota Highway 21
- Ohio State Route 21
- Pennsylvania Route 21
- South Carolina Highway 21 (1920s) (former)
- South Dakota Highway 21
- Tennessee State Route 21
- Texas State Highway 21
  - Texas State Highway Loop 21
  - Farm to Market Road 21
  - Texas Park Road 21
- Utah State Route 21
- State Route 21 (Virginia 1918-1933) (former)
- Washington State Route 21
  - Primary State Highway 21 (Washington) (former)
  - Secondary State Highway 21B (Washington) (former)
  - Secondary State Highway 21C (Washington) (former)
- County Route 21 (Jackson County, West Virginia)
  - County Route 21 (Kanawha County, West Virginia)
  - County Route 21 (Wirt County, West Virginia)
  - County Route 21 (Wood County, West Virginia)
- Wisconsin Highway 21

Territories

- Puerto Rico Highway 21

== See also ==
- List of A21 roads
- List of highways numbered 21A

Preceded by 20	Lists of highways 21	Succeeded by 22
