= Moudania =

Moudania (Greek: Μουδανιά, Moudaniá) may refer to:

- Moudania, the Greek name of Mudanya, a town in Asia Minor, Turkey
- Moudania (former municipality), a municipal unit in Chalkidiki, Greece, named after Mudanya
- Nea Moudania, a town in Chalkidiki, Greece
