= Agios Pavlos =

Agios Pavlos or Ayios Pavlos (Greek: Άγιος Παύλος, "Saint Paul") may refer to the following places:

- Agios Pavlos, Thessaloniki
- Agios Pavlos, Chalkidiki
- Ayios Pavlos, Limassol
