= Flogita =

Town in Macedonia, Greece

Flogita Φλογητά
- Community
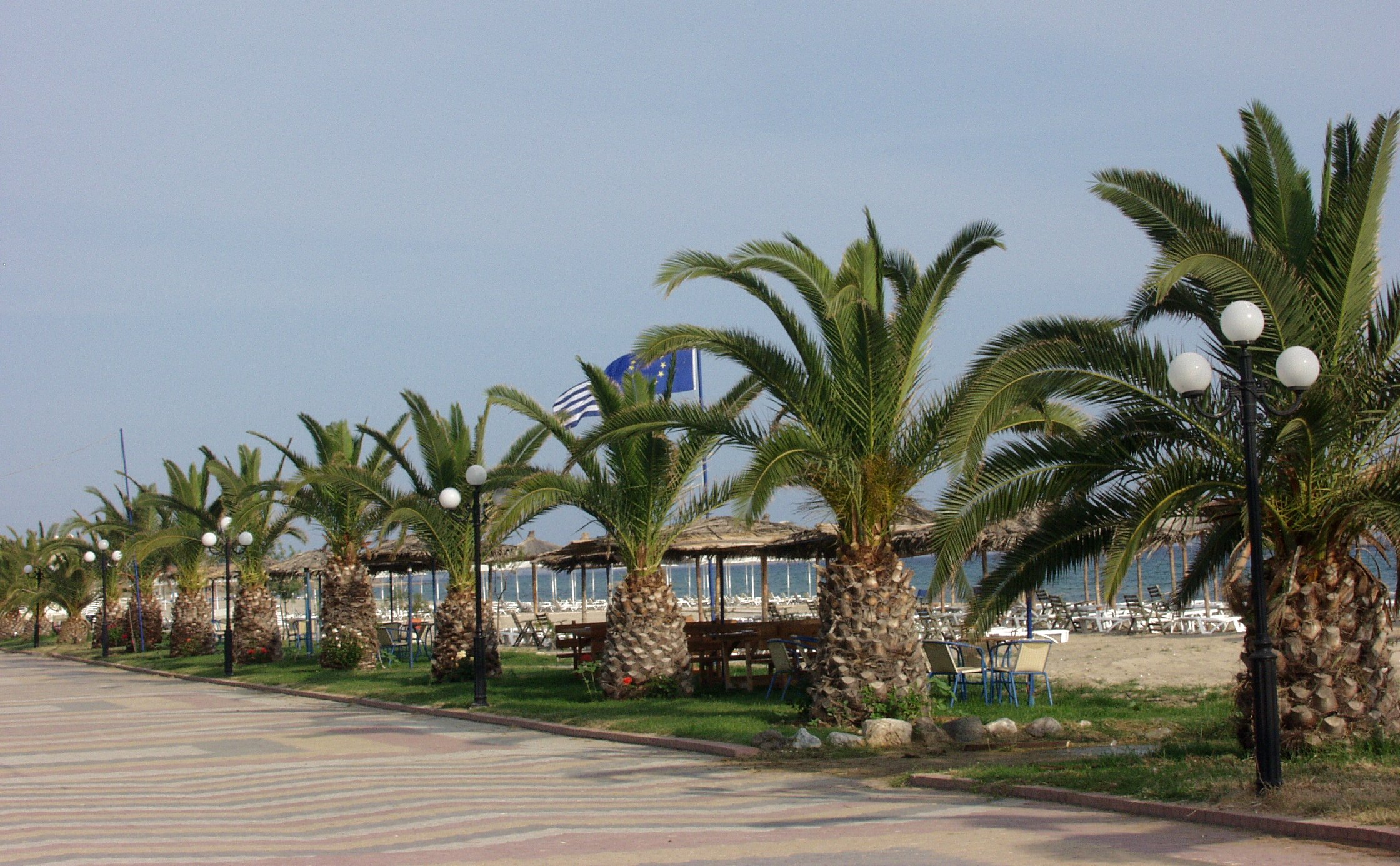
- View of Flogita promenade

- Location within Greece
- Coordinates: 40°26′N 23°22′E
- Country: Greece
- Administrative region: Central Macedonia
- Regional unit: Chalkidiki
- Municipality: Nea Propontida
- Municipal unit: Moudania
- Village established: 1923

Population (2021)
  - Community: 1,595
- Time zone: UTC+2 (EET)
  - Summer (DST): UTC+3 (EEST)

Flogita (Greek: Φλογητά, also: Νέα Φλογητά - Nea Flogita) is a coastal village in Chalkidiki, Greece, 52 km from Thessaloniki and 6 km from Nea Moudania. The village, in the municipality of Nea Propontida, is built on a hill overlooking the Thermaikos Gulf. Most of the village is only a few minutes from the sea, and on a clear day, there is a wonderful view across the bay to Mount Olympus.

Flogita was founded in 1923, when refugees fleeing from Anatolia after the Greco-Turkish War assembled to build New (Nea) Flogita. It takes its name from the village Flogita in Cappadocia, currently Suvermez in Derinkuyu District.

Flogita has 1,595 permanent residents, according to the 2021 census. This number increases hugely in the summer months, when visitor numbers raise the population to 20,000.

== Tourism ==
Flogita is a popular tourist resort, particularly in the summer, and as a result facilities and amusements have increased to cater for the influx. Flogita is noted for its big sandy beach, roughly one kilometre long, and its paved promenade which is popular in the evenings for the customary "volta", or walk. The sea is particularly warm. The sea floor is shallow, which has resulted in the popularity of marine sports in the village.

Along the sea front there are many tavernas, fast foods shops, confectioners, beach bar cafes, and nightclubs. The atmosphere in the height of the summer season is that of a “party style village”. In the "off" season, Flogita is very quiet.

== Climate ==
The climate in Western Chalkidiki is mild enough that even the wintry months allow some sunshine in the daytime. Summer is characterized by hot days and warm evenings.
