= List of A21 roads =

This is a list of roads designated A21. Roads are sorted in the countries' alphabetical order.

- City Ring Route in Adelaide, South Australia
- South Gippsland Highway (Victoria, Australia)
- A21 (Toowoomba, Queensland)
- A21 motorway (Austria), a road connecting Altlengbach and the A1 to Vösendorf and the A2
- A21 road (England), a road connecting London with Hastings on the south coast
- A21 motorway (France), a road connecting Aix-Noulette and Douai
- A 21 motorway (Germany), a road connecting the road interchange with the A 1 at Bargteheide with Wankendorf
- A21 expressway (Greece), a road connecting Provatonas and Mandra
- A21 motorway (Italy), a road connecting Turin and Brescia
- A-21 motorway (Spain), a road connecting Jaca, Aragon and Pamplona, Navarre
- A21 road (Sri Lanka), a road connecting Kegalle and Karawanella
- A21 road (United States of America) may refer to:
  - A21 road (California), a road

== See also ==
- List of highways numbered 21
- List of 21A roads
