= Agios Pavlos, Chalkidiki =

Agios Pavlos Άγιος Παύλος
- Community
- Location within Greece
- Coordinates: 40°20.5′N 23°3.7′E
- Country: Greece
- Administrative region: Central Macedonia
- Regional unit: Chalkidiki
- Municipality: Nea Propontida
- Municipal unit: Kallikrateia

Population (2021)
  - Community: 1,196
- Time zone: UTC+2 (EET)
  - Summer (DST): UTC+3 (EEST)
- Postal code: 630 80
- Area code: 23990
- Vehicle registration: XK

Agios Pavlos (Greek: Άγιος Παύλος) is a village and a community in Chalkidiki, Greece. It is part of the municipality Nea Propontida, southeast of Thessaloniki. The community consists of the villages Agios Pavlos and Nea Irakleia, and has a population of 1,196 (2021). Nea Irakleia has a school, a church and a beach.

== Geography ==
Farmlands cover the coastline around Nea Irakleia while the mountains cover the rest of the community. Tourism is very common during the summer months.

== See also ==
- List of settlements in Chalkidiki
