= A23 expressway (Greece) =

Expressway in Greece

A23 expressway
- Αυτοκινητόδρομος Α23
- Route of the A23 expressway, in blue

Route information
- Length: 23 km (14 mi)

Major junctions
- South end: Komotini (A2)
- North end: Border with Bulgaria (Makaza)

Location
- Country: Greece
- Regions: Eastern Macedonia and Thrace
- Primary destinations: Komotini; Nymfaia; Border with Bulgaria (Makaza)

Highway system
- Highways in Greece; Motorways; National roads
← A21	→ A24

The A23 expressway, also known as the Komotini–Nymfaia–Greek-Bulgarian Border Vertical Axis (Greek: Κάθετος Άξονας Κομοτηνή – Νυμφαία – Ελληνο-Βουλγαρικά Σύνορα), is an expressway in north eastern Greece. The road is one of three A-prefix roads in Greece that are entirely an expressway – the others being the A21 in Evros and the A242 towards Thessaloniki Airport.

== Route ==
The A23 expressway is a 23-kilometre-long (14-mile) north–south route, located entirely within the Komotini municipality: most of the road is single carriageway. The road branches off the A2 motorway at Kikidio, south east of Komotini, and heads north towards the border with Bulgaria at Makaza, passing Nymfaia to the east, and connecting with the I-5 road at the border. The road also connects with the EO2 at Kikidio.

According to Eleftherotypia in September 2013, the A23 was part of a 926-kilometre-long (575-mile) corridor through Southeast Europe, connecting Greece with Bulgaria, Romania and Moldova: however, the A23 north of Kalchas has a 3.5-tonne weight limit, making the road useless as an international route for trucks and large buses.

== History ==
Egnatia Odos S.A. was responsible for building the A23 expressway: the project was split in two phases: the first phase ran between Kalchas and the border with Bulgaria at Makaza; the second phase ran between the junction with the A2 motorway at Kikidio to Kalchas, bypassing Komotini.

The first phase was tendered on 15 December 2006, with an initial budget of €85 million, and the contract was signed with Consorzio Stabile Italimprese on 20 July 2007: this section, along with the border controls, opened on 9 September 2013, at a total cost of €90.4 million. The contract for the second phase was signed with Ergobeton S.A. on 20 April 2015, with an initial budget of €21 million: this section, completing the A23, opened on 14 March 2017, at a total construction cost of €13.1 million.

Border controls with Bulgaria, at the northern end of the expressway, were later abolished on 1 January 2025 when Bulgaria fully joined the Schengen Area.
