= Moudania (municipal unit) =

Moudania Μουδανιά
- Municipal unit
- Location within the regional unit

- Location within Greece
- Coordinates: 40°14′N 23°17′E
- Country: Greece
- Administrative region: Central Macedonia
- Regional unit: Chalkidiki
- Municipality: Nea Propontida

Area
  - Municipal unit: 141.464 km^{2} (54.620 sq mi)
- Elevation: 20 m (66 ft)

Population (2021)
  - Municipal unit: 19,104
  - Municipal unit density: 135.04/km^{2} (349.76/sq mi)
- Time zone: UTC+2 (EET)
  - Summer (DST): UTC+3 (EEST)
- Postal code: 632 00
- Area code: 23730
- Vehicle registration: ΧΚ
- Website: www.moudania.gr

Moudania (Greek: Μουδανιά, Moudaniá) is a former municipality in Chalkidiki, Greece, named after Mudanya in present Turkey. Since the 2011 local government reform it is part of the municipality Nea Propontida, of which it is a municipal unit. The municipal unit has an area of 141.464 km^{2}. The seat of the municipality was in Nea Moudania. The area is a popular tourist resort for people from Thessaloniki.

== Subdivisions ==
The municipal unit Moudania is subdivided into the following communities:

- Nea Moudania
- Agios Mamas
- Agios Panteleimonas
- Dionysiou
- Zografou
- Nea Poteidaia
- Portaria
- Simantra
- Flogita

== Population ==
Historical population
Year	Pop.	±%
1991	13,652	—
2001	16,236	+18.9%
2011	19,067	+17.4%
2021	19,104	+0.2%
