= Kallikrateia =

Kallikrateia Καλλικράτεια
- Municipal unit
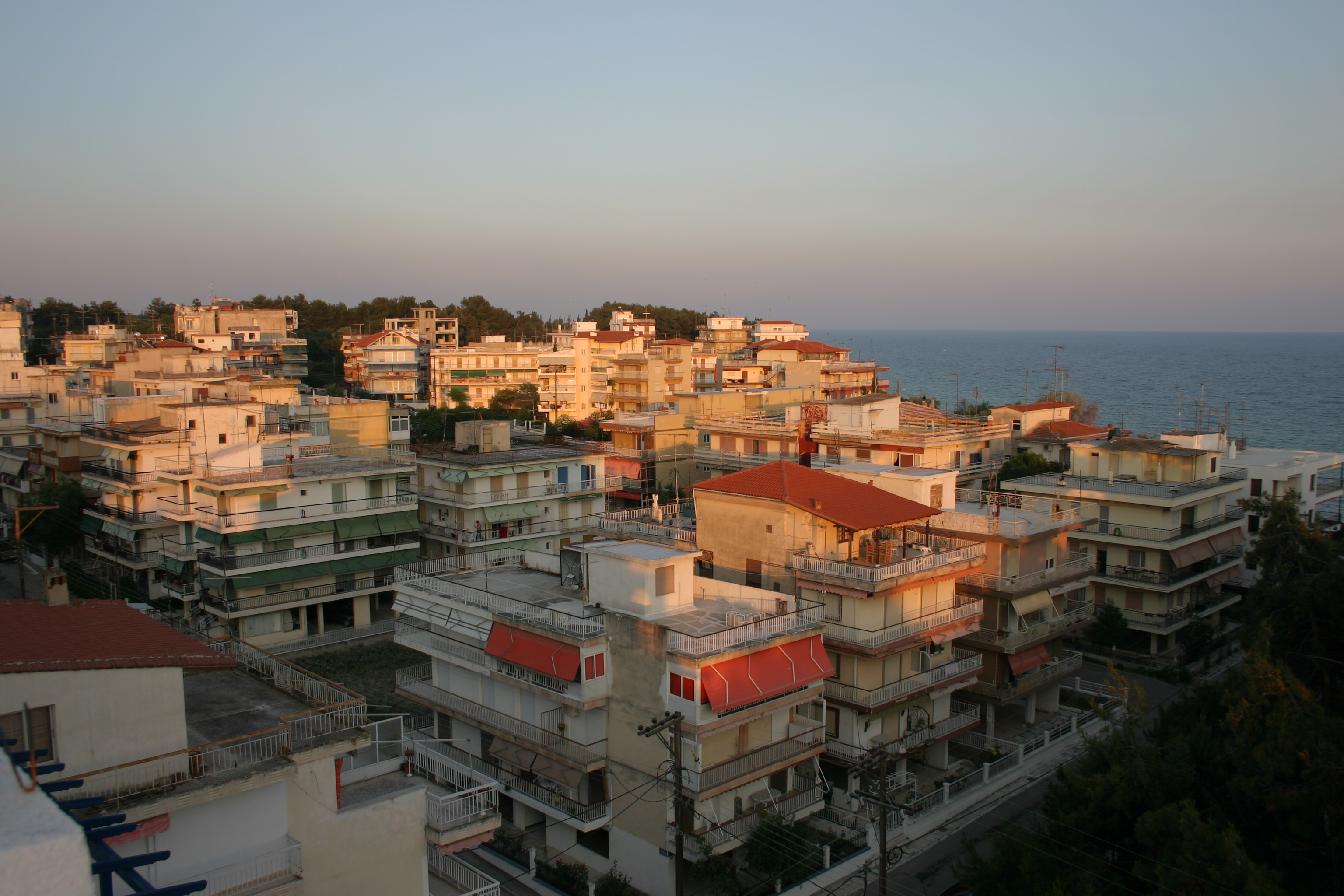
- View of Nea Kallikrateia

- Location within the regional unit

- Location within Greece
- Coordinates: 40°19′N 23°04′E
- Country: Greece
- Administrative region: Central Macedonia
- Regional unit: Chalkidiki
- Municipality: Nea Propontida

Area
  - Municipal unit: 108.9 km^{2} (42.0 sq mi)
- Elevation: 20 m (66 ft)

Population (2021)
  - Municipal unit: 10,144
  - Municipal unit density: 93.15/km^{2} (241.3/sq mi)
  - Community: 6,128
- Time zone: UTC+2 (EET)
  - Summer (DST): UTC+3 (EEST)
- Postal code: 63080
- Area code: 2399
- Vehicle registration: ΧΚ
- Website: http://www.kallikrateia.gr

Kallikrateia (Greek: Καλλικράτεια) is a municipal unit in Chalkidiki, Greece. Since the 2011 local government reform it is part of the municipality of Nea Propontida, before which it was a municipality with its seat in the town Nea Kallikrateia. The municipal unit has an area of 108.894 km^{2}. According to the census of 2021, the municipal unit has a population of 10,144 people while the town itself has 6,128 inhabitants, third largest in Chalkidiki.

== History ==
Nea Kallikrateia was established after the refugee crisis in 1922, mainly by the residents who came from Kallikrateia (today Mimarsinan, a neighbourhood of Büyükçekmece) in Eastern Thrace and set up in the area, where the metochi of the Xenophontos Monastery of Mount Athos existed and it was called “Stomion”. Many testimonies report that it was inhabited by the prehistoric years; however, they are not confirmed. Further, Christian refugees from Silata (today Sille, Konya) established the village of Nea Silata.

== Subdivisions ==
The municipal unit of Kallikrateia consists of the communities of Agios Pavlos, Lakkoma, Nea Gonia, Nea Kallikrateia and Nea Silata.
