= List of highways numbered 21A =

Route 21A, or Highway 21A, may refer to:

== India ==
- National Highway 21A (India)

== United States ==
- County Road 21A (Clay County, Florida)
- M-21A (Michigan highway) (former)
- Nebraska Spur 21A
- New Jersey Route 21A (former)
- New York State Route 21A (former)
  - County Route 21A (Suffolk County, New York)
  - County Route 21A (Sullivan County, New York)
  - County Route 21A (Warren County, New York)
- Secondary State Highway 21A (Washington) (former)

== See also ==
- List of A21 roads
