= Nea Poteidaia =

Village in Chalkidiki, Greece

Nea Poteidaia Νέα Ποτείδαια
- Community
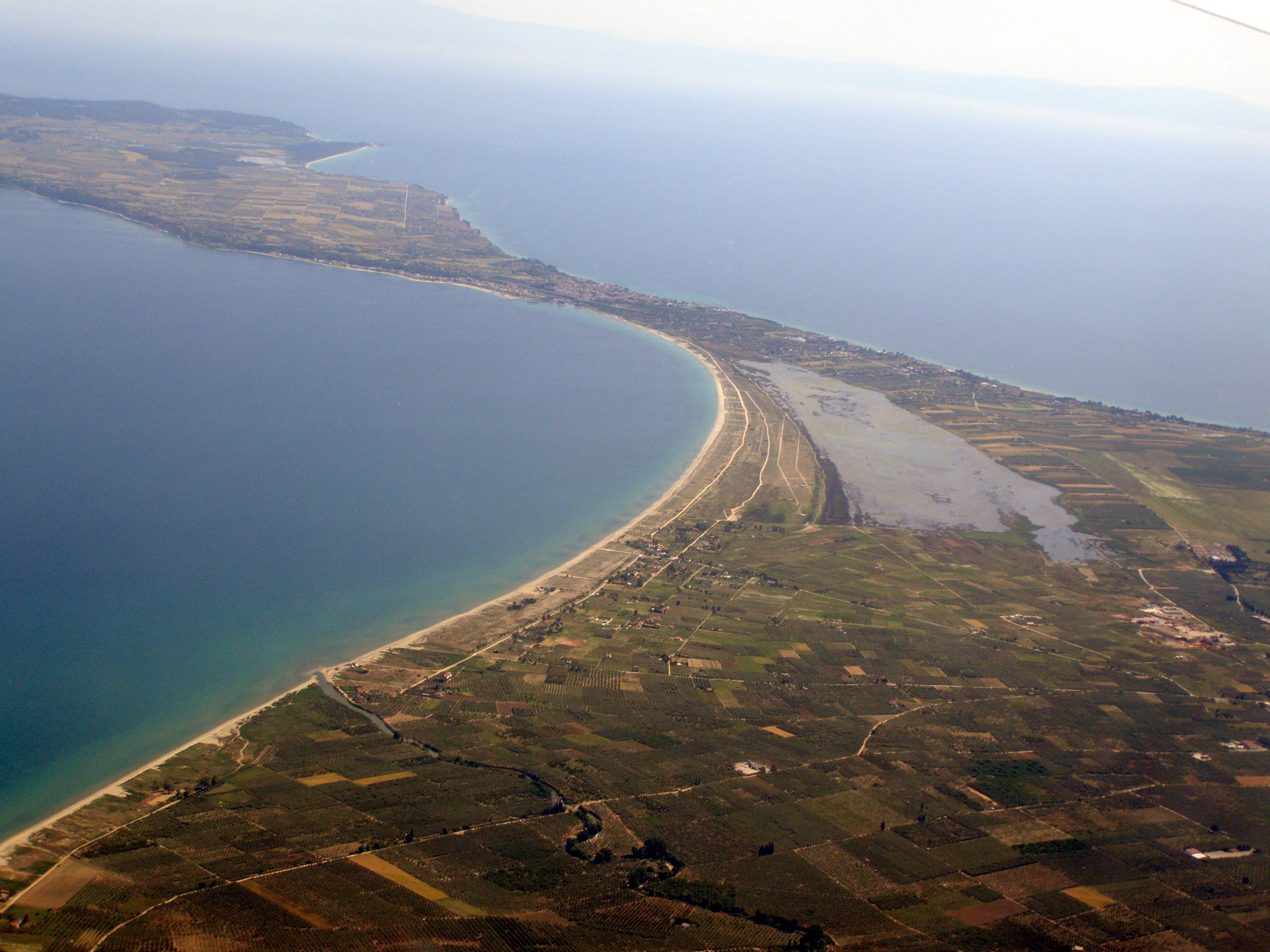

- Location within Greece
- Coordinates: 40°11′42″N 23°19′48″E
- Country: Greece
- Administrative region: Central Macedonia
- Regional unit: Chalkidiki
- Municipality: Nea Propontida
- Municipal unit: Moudania
- Village established: 1922 (104 years ago)

Population (2021)
  - Community: 1,543
- Time zone: UTC+2 (EET)
  - Summer (DST): UTC+3 (EEST)

Nea Poteidaia (Greek: Νέα Ποτείδαια, also Νέα Ποτίδαια) is a town in the municipality of Nea Propontida in Chalkidiki, Greece. The location is the only land access to the Kassandra Peninsula. Built on the site of the ancient city of Potidaea, 33 kilometers south-west of Polygyros, it was re-founded in 1922 by Greek refugees from Platanos in Eastern Thrace and Kalolimnos (now called Imrali) which remained under Turkish rule. Today it has a population of 1,543 (2011).

== Prehistory ==
In 1960, archeologists discovered the bones of a young girl believed to have died almost 700,000 years ago. These are the oldest skeletal remains ever found in Greece.

== History ==
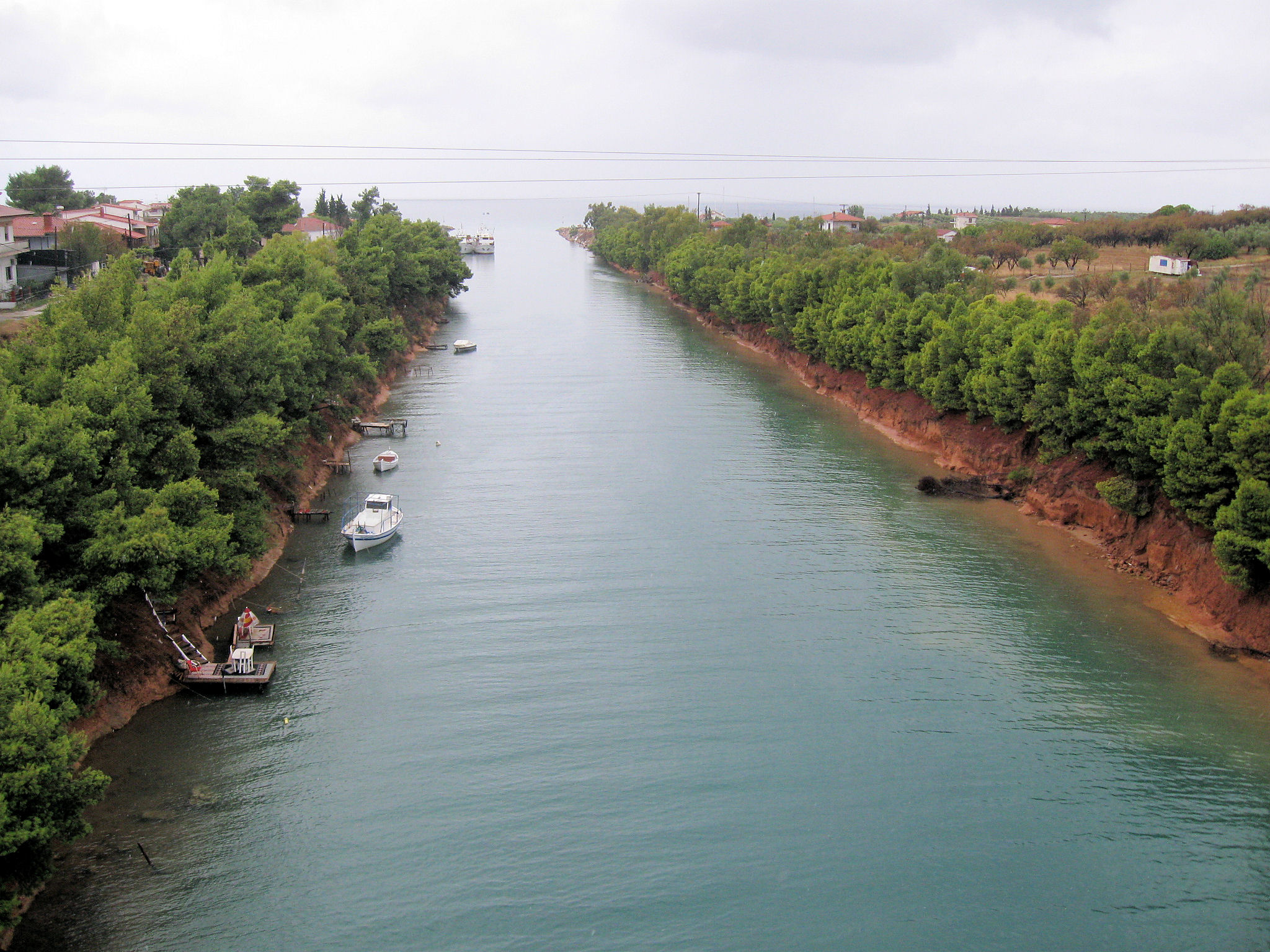
Potidea canal

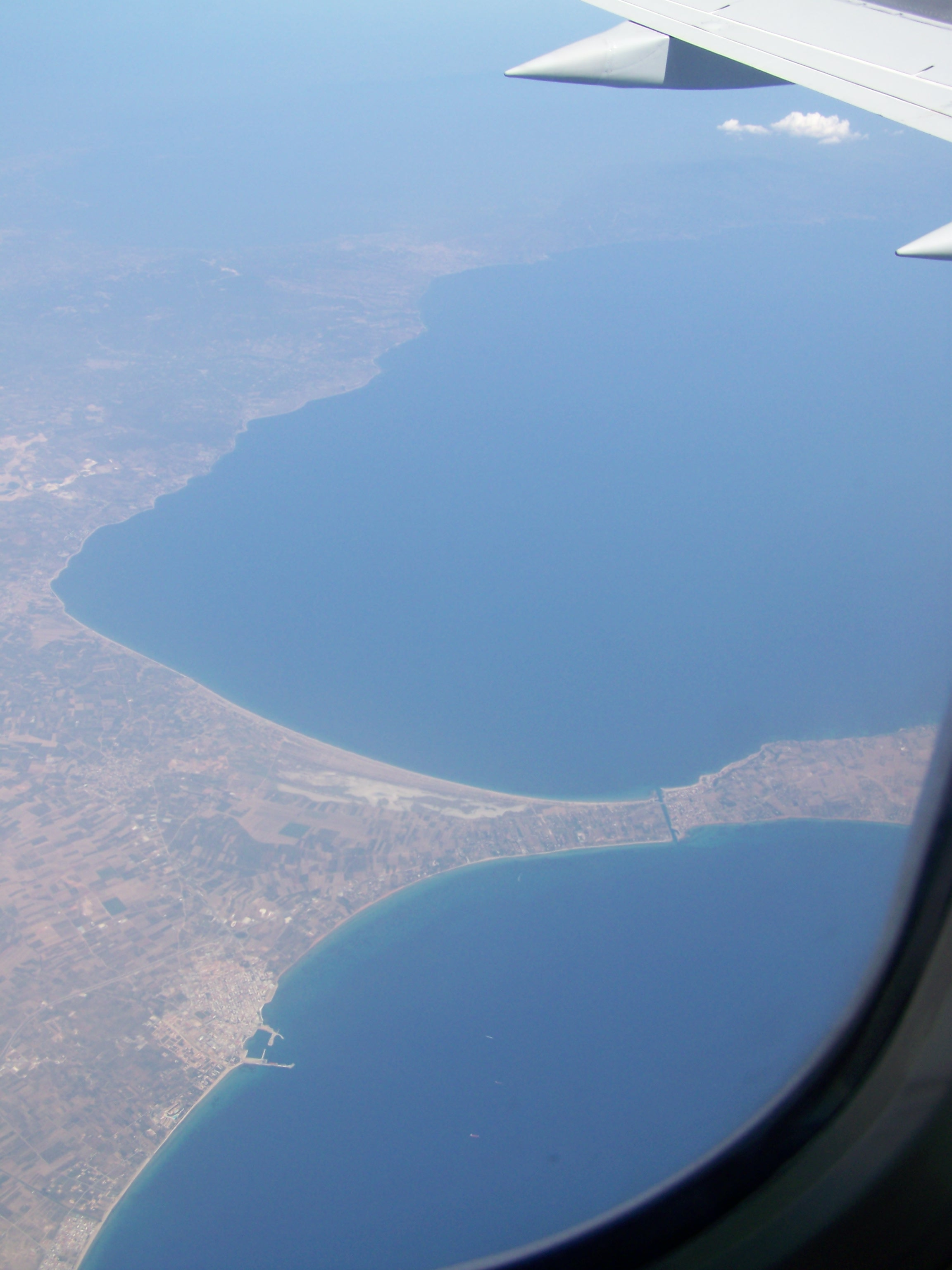
Nea Potidea and the isthmus connecting the Kassandra peninsula to the mainland.

Classical Potidaea, a colony of Corinth, was founded about 600 BC on the saddle of the Pallini Peninsula. As the name of the city denotes, its patron deity was Poseidon. During the expedition of Xerxes against Greece in 480 BC, the city was defeated following a siege. However, a year later it had gathered its forces and resisted the siege of Artavazos. In the same year, it was the only city of Macedonia which, along with other Greek cities, took part in the battle of Plataea, a Hellenic victory.

Subsequently Potidea was a member of the first Athenian Alliance. It seceded in 432/1 BC with the support of the Corinthians and King Perdikas II. In 431 BC, after the siege by the Athenian general Kallias (in which Socrates fought bravely as Alcibiades recounts at the end of Plato's 'The Symposium'), it was subjugated and subsequently forced to take in settlers from Athens. When the Peloponnesian War was over, Potidea was freed from the domination of Athens but received a second wave of Athenian settlers in 362/1 BC. In 356 BC, it was destroyed by the king of Macedonia, Philip II and was turned over to the Olynthians. In 349/8 BC the city along with the rest of the cities of Chalkidiki became part of the Macedonian Kingdom.

After a period of desertion of about 40 years, in 316 BC, Kassandros built a new city on the site of Potidea, which was named after him, Kassandria (this may indicate that he intended to make it his capital, or at least an important naval base). In the following period until Macedonia was conquered by the Romans (168 BC), Kassandria developed into one of the most powerful cities of Macedonia. It was almost certainly during this time that the canal was opened, which facilitated navigation and boosted trade and economic development.

In 168 BC, the city came under Roman rule and flourished anew. Potidea's decay is linked to the invasions of the Huns, who invaded Macedonia in 540 AD. Consequently, despite Justinian's efforts in the 6th century AD, the city was completely deserted, according to historical sources. Its castle, being of great importance for the security of the whole peninsula, was repaired by John VII Paleologos in 1407 and later by the Venetians when they were given the city of Thessalonica in 1423 in an attempt to keep it from the Ottomans. In 1430 it came under Turkish domination.

During the Greek Revolution of 1821, the people of Chalkidiki entrenched themselves in the castle. They fought hard until the ”turmoil of Kassandra“, the well-known "holocaust", when the canal 'ran with blood', which is commemorated with official celebrations every year on its anniversary, November 14. After the revolution, the old fortification was repaired and re-used, and a new cutting of the canal was made.

Today Nea Poteidaia is mainly a tourist destination for visitors seeking beaches and wildlife.

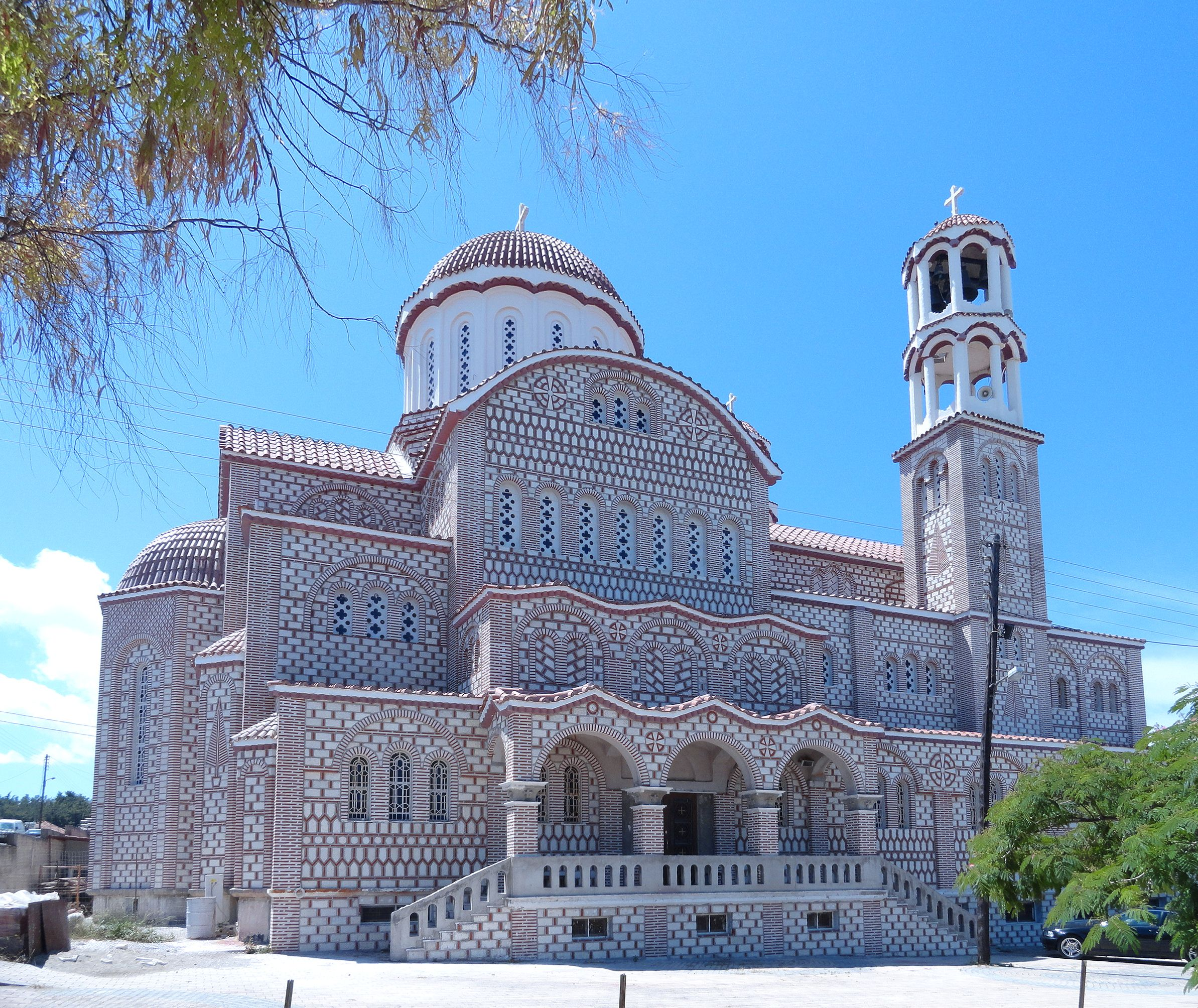
Church of St. George in Nea Potidea
