= Kalchas, Rhodope =

Kalchas Κάλχας
- Community
- Location within Greece
- Coordinates: 41°8′N 25°27′E
- Country: Greece
- Administrative region: East Macedonia and Thrace
- Regional unit: Rhodope regional unit
- Municipality: Komotini
- Municipal unit: Komotini
- Highest elevation: 100 m (330 ft)

Population (2021)
  - Community: 1,074
- Time zone: UTC+2 (EET)
  - Summer (DST): UTC+3 (EEST)

Kalchas (Greek: Κάλχας, Turkish: Kalfa), is a village and a community in the municipality of Komotini, in the Rhodope regional unit, East Macedonia and Thrace, Greece. It is located in a flat area, 5 km northeast of Komotini. The community consists of the villages Kalchas, Iampolis, Megali Ada and Mytikas.

At the 2021 census, the population was 1,074 for the community.

The village is crossed by a small stream (known locally by the name Trelocheimarros), tributary of the Vozvozis, that often overflows during the winter causing problems in transportation. In 2011 the Army has placed a military bridge over the stream that improved significantly the transportation. The main occupation of the village residents is the cultivation of tobacco. Just outside the village passes the single carriageway A23 expressway between the A2 motorway (Egnatia Odos) and the Greek-Bulgarian border at Makaza.
