= Kalchas, Pakistan =

Coordinates: 29°21′N 69°42′E

Kalchas
- Town and union council
- Interactive map of Kalchas
- Country: Pakistan
- Region: Balochistan
- District: Dera Bugti District
- Time zone: UTC+5 (PST)

Kalchas is a town and union council of Dera Bugti District in the Balochistan province of Pakistan. The area is dominated by the Nohkhani tribe, with the late Wadera Fateh Muhammad Khan being a notable Nokhani Mukkadam (Chief). In 2004, the government of Pakistan granted licenses to oil and gas companies for exploration of resources in this area.
