= A21 expressway (Greece) =

Expressway in Greece

A21 expressway
- Αυτοκινητόδρομος Α21
- Route of the A21 expressway, in blue

Route information
- Length: 29.8 km (18.5 mi)

Major junctions
- South end: Provatonas
- North end: Mandra

Location
- Country: Greece
- Regions: Eastern Macedonia and Thrace
- Primary destinations: Provatonas; Mandra

Highway system
- Highways in Greece; Motorways; National roads
← A2	→ A23

The A21 expressway, also known as the Ardani–Ormenio–Greek-Bulgarian Border Vertical Axis (Greek: Κάθετος Άξονας Αρδάνιο - Ορμένιο – Ελληνο-Βουλγαρικά Σύνορα), is a partially built expressway that runs near the Greece–Turkey border in north eastern Greece. The A21 is currently planned to run between the junction with the A2 motorway near Ardani and Mandra, and is one of three A-prefix roads in Greece that are entirely an expressway – the others being the A23 in Rhodope and the A242 towards Thessaloniki Airport.

== Route ==
The A21 expressway is currently a 29.8-kilometre-long (18.5-mile) north–south route, located entirely within the Soufli municipality: it is entirely single carriageway, running between Provatonas in the south and Mandra in the north. The A21 runs concurrently and parallel to the EO51, connecting with the latter on both ends.

== History ==
The A21 was first proposed by Ministerial Decision DMEO/o/7157/e/1042 of 1 October 2008: the planned route ran between the junction with the A2 motorway near Ardani in the south and the border with Bulgaria near Ormenio in the north, replacing the Kastanies–Ormenio National Road and most of the EO51.

In November 2016, the regional government of Eastern Macedonia and Thrace agreed to convert part of the planned route into an expressway, with an initial budget of €39.7 million: the project, which is being delivered by Nea Egnatia Odos (formerly Egnatia Odos S.A. until 31 December 2025), covers 38 kilometres (24 miles) between the junction with the A2 and Mandra, and includes ten grade-separated exits.
