= Nea Moudania =

City in Macedonia, Greece

Nea Moudania Νέα Μουδανιά
- Community
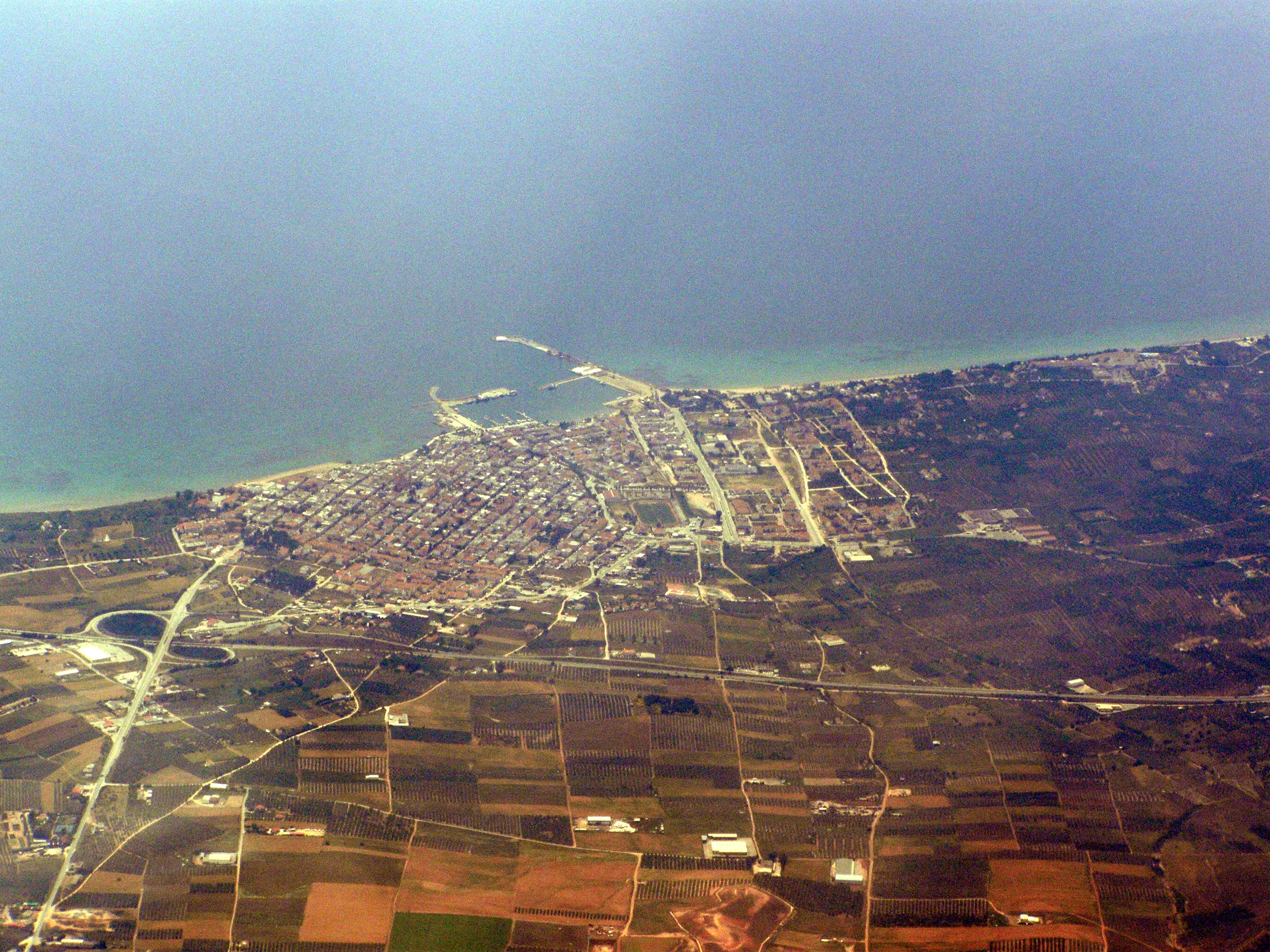
- Aerial photo

- Location within Greece
- Coordinates: 40°14′N 23°17′E
- Country: Greece
- Geographic region: Macedonia
- Administrative region: Central Macedonia
- Regional unit: Chalkidiki
- Municipality: Nea Propontida
- Municipal unit: Moudania
- City established: 1922 (104 years ago)
- Elevation: 20 m (66 ft)

Population (2021)
  - Community: 10,042
- Time zone: UTC+2 (EET)
  - Summer (DST): UTC+3 (EEST)
- Postal code: 632 00
- Area code: 2373
- Vehicle registration: XK

Nea Moudania (Greek: Νέα Μουδανιά, Néa Moudaniá; often referred to as Moudania (Μουδανιά, Moudaniá), the name of the municipal unit to which the town belongs, is the seat of the municipality of Nea Propontida, Chalkidiki, Greece. The town is 60 km south of Thessaloniki and is the financial and commercial center of Chalkidiki, as well as its most populous town. It was built after 1922 by Greek refugees from Asia Minor who wanted to give the settlement the name of their hometown (now Mudanya, Turkey), hence the addition of the word nea, which means new in Greek. Nea Moudania hosts the Department of Fisheries and Aquaculture Technology of the Alexander Technological Educational Institute of Thessaloniki. The town's harbor serves as Thessaloniki's adjuvant.

== Sports ==
P.O. Moudania (Panathletic Association of Moudania) is the only sports club in Nea Moudania, whose football team play in the Chalkidiki FCA Second Division, while the volleyball team play in the A2 Ethniki Volleyball.

== Historical population ==
Historical population
Year	Pop.	±%
1981	4,142	—
1991	4,403	+6.3%
2001	6,430	+46.0%
2011	9,342	+45.3%
2021	10,042	+7.5%

== See also ==
- List of settlements in Chalkidiki
- Apamea Myrlea

== Gallery ==
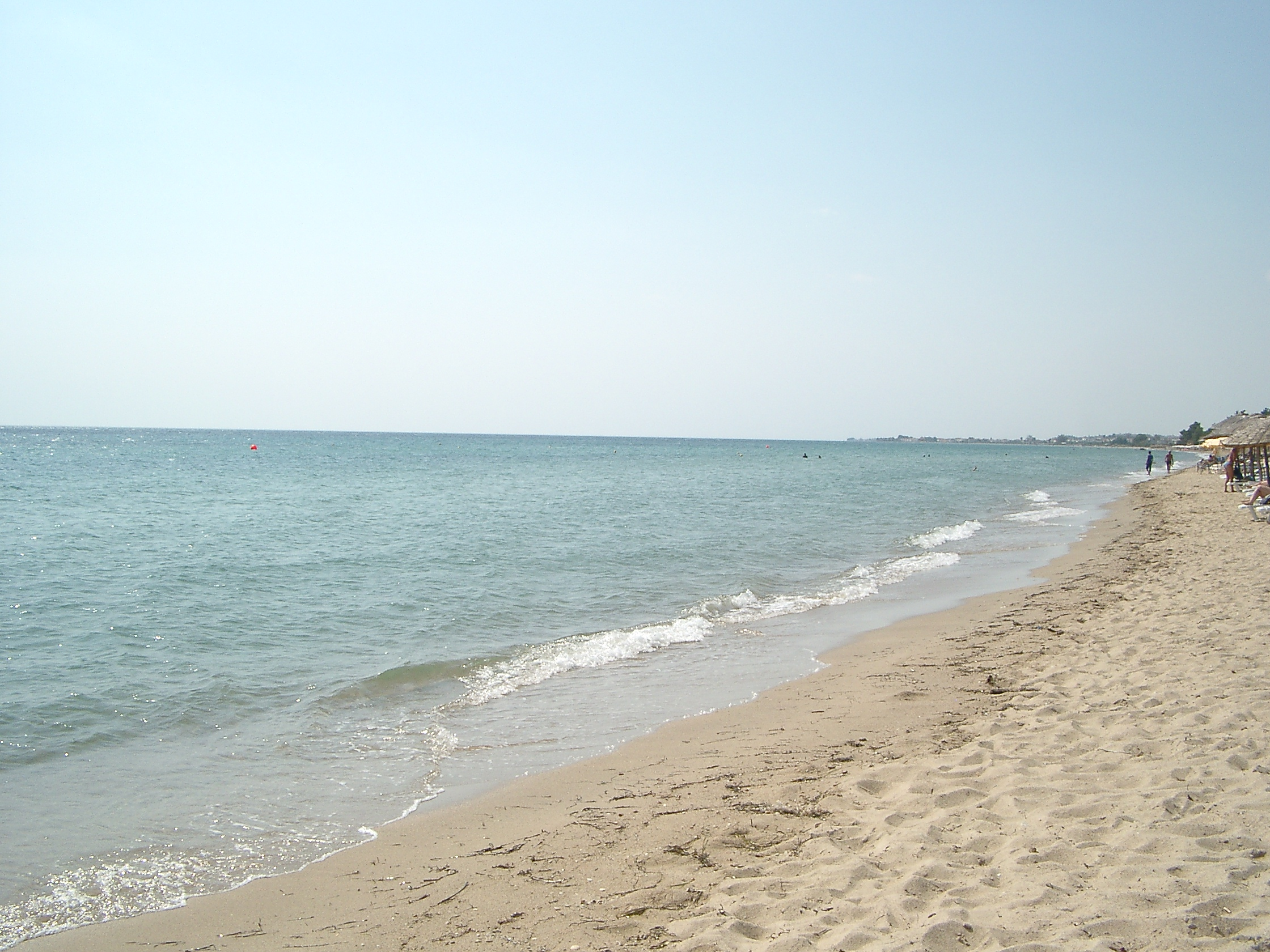
Beach

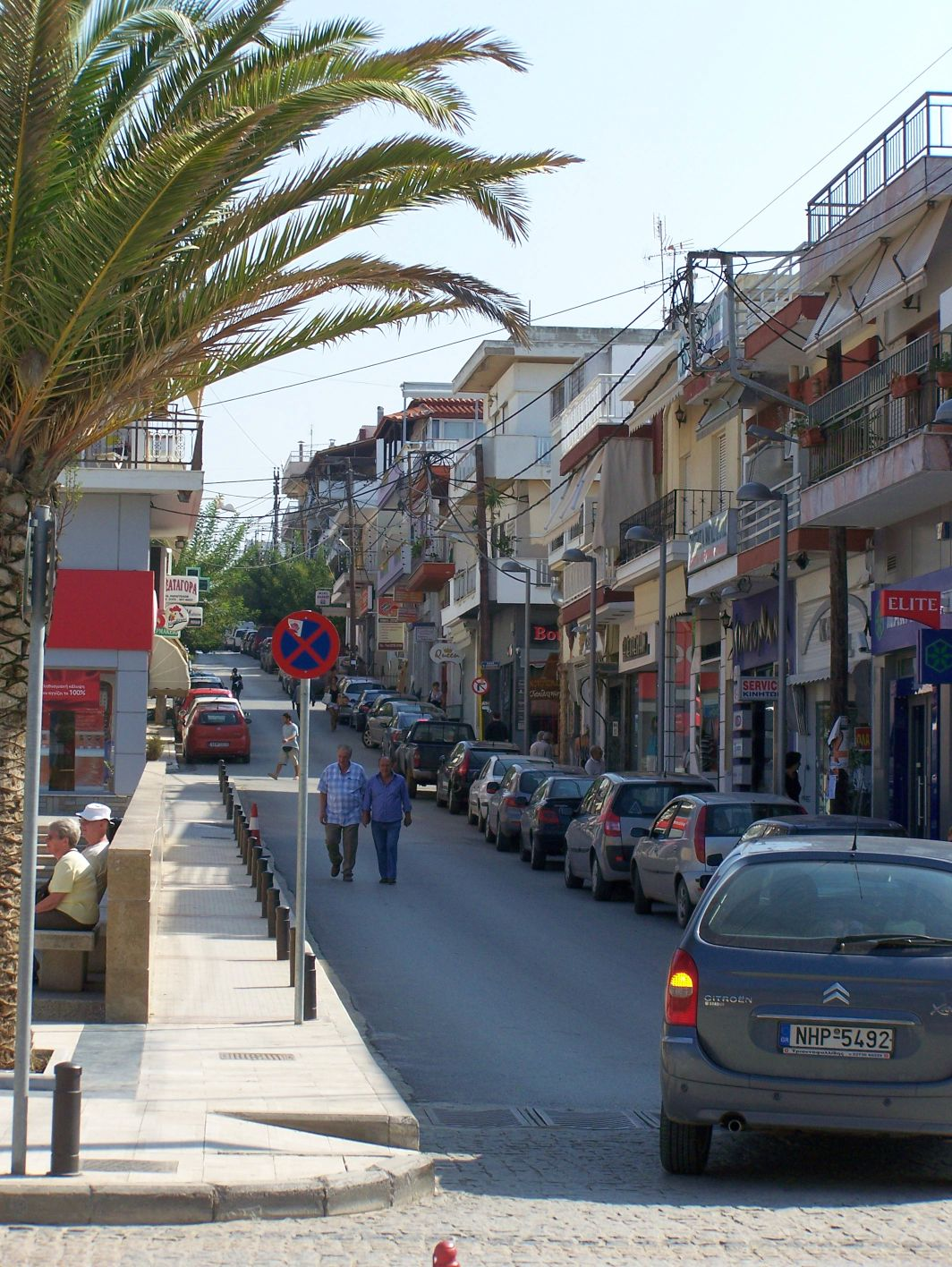
Street

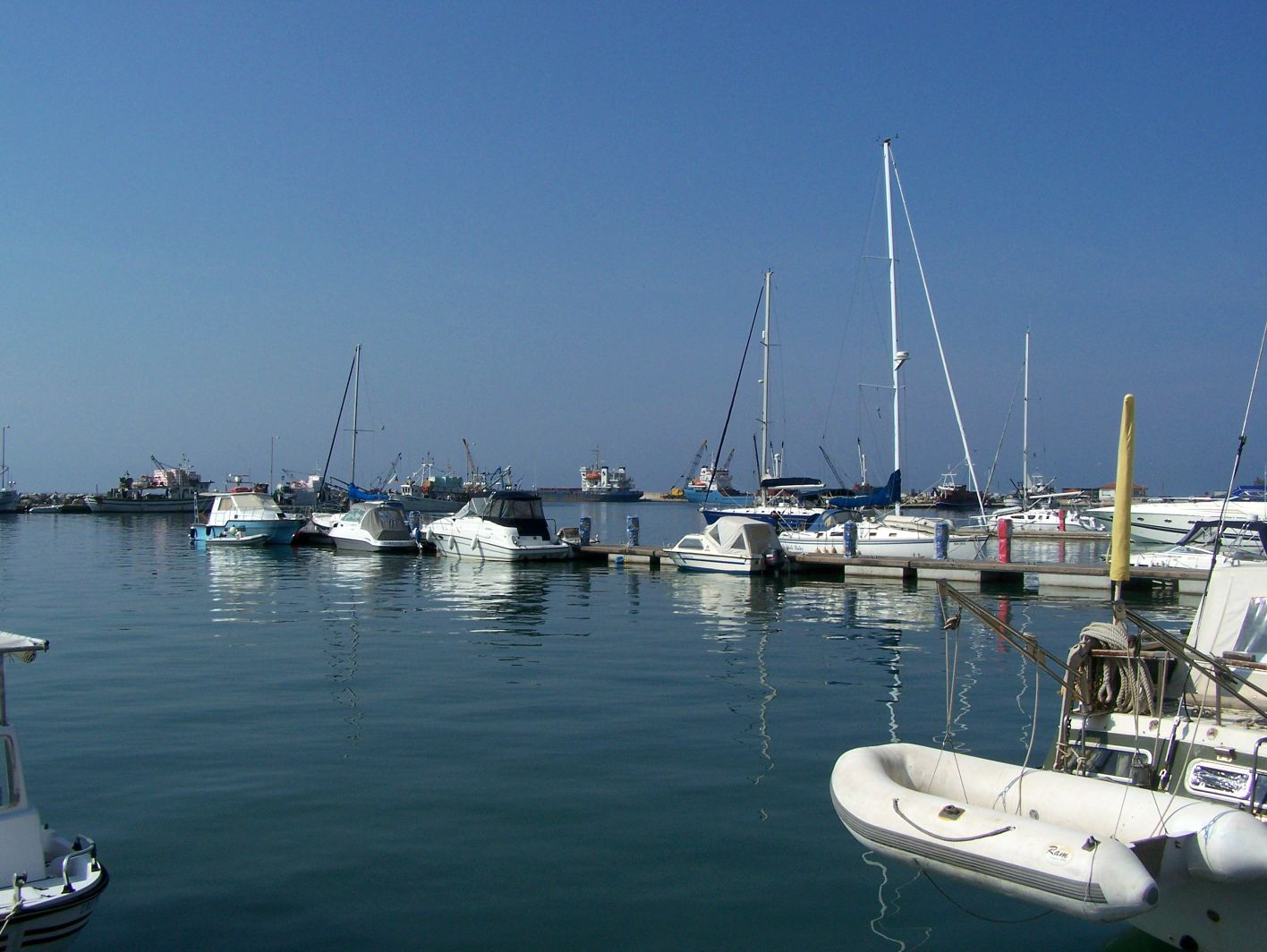
The port

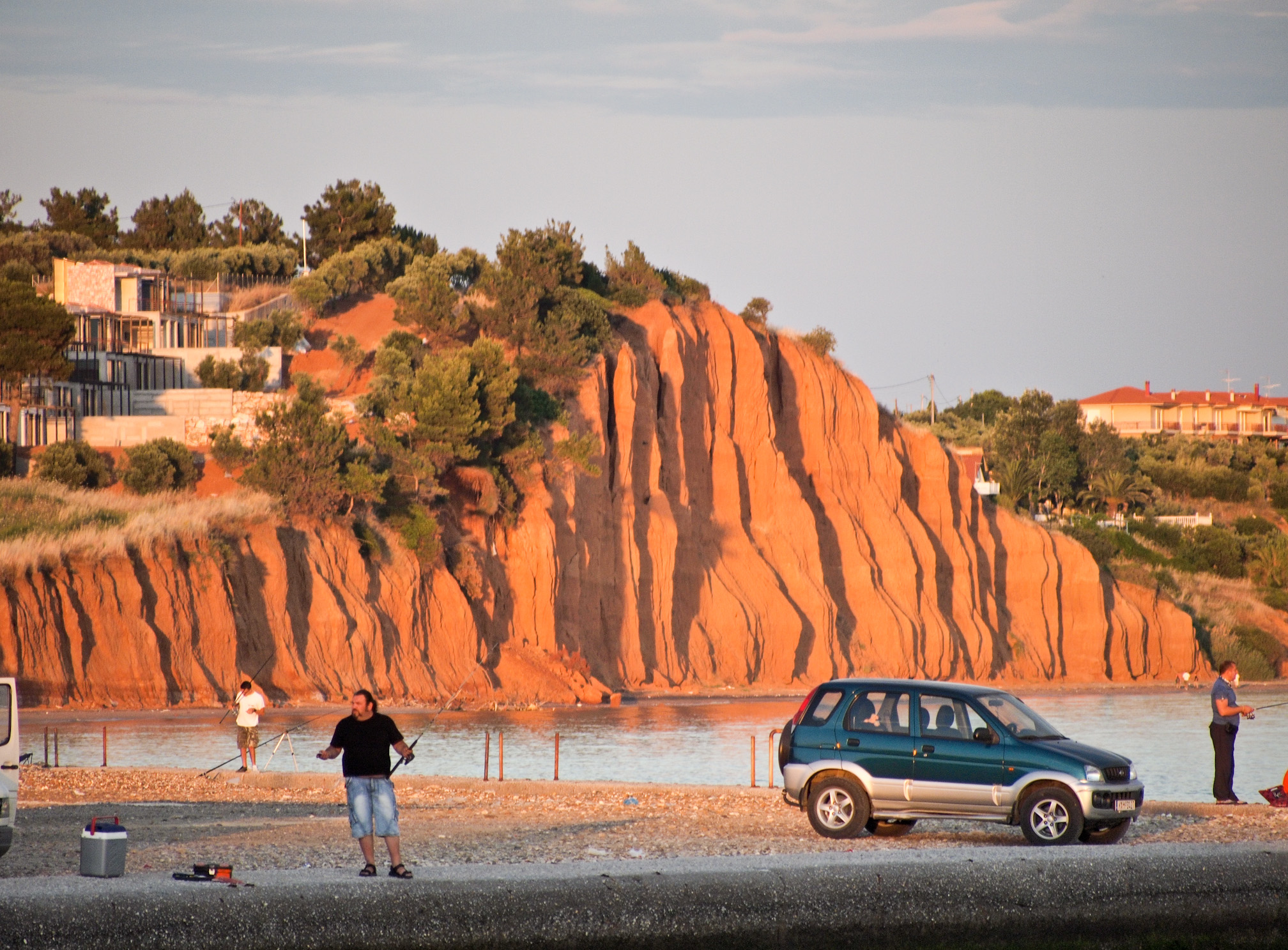
View

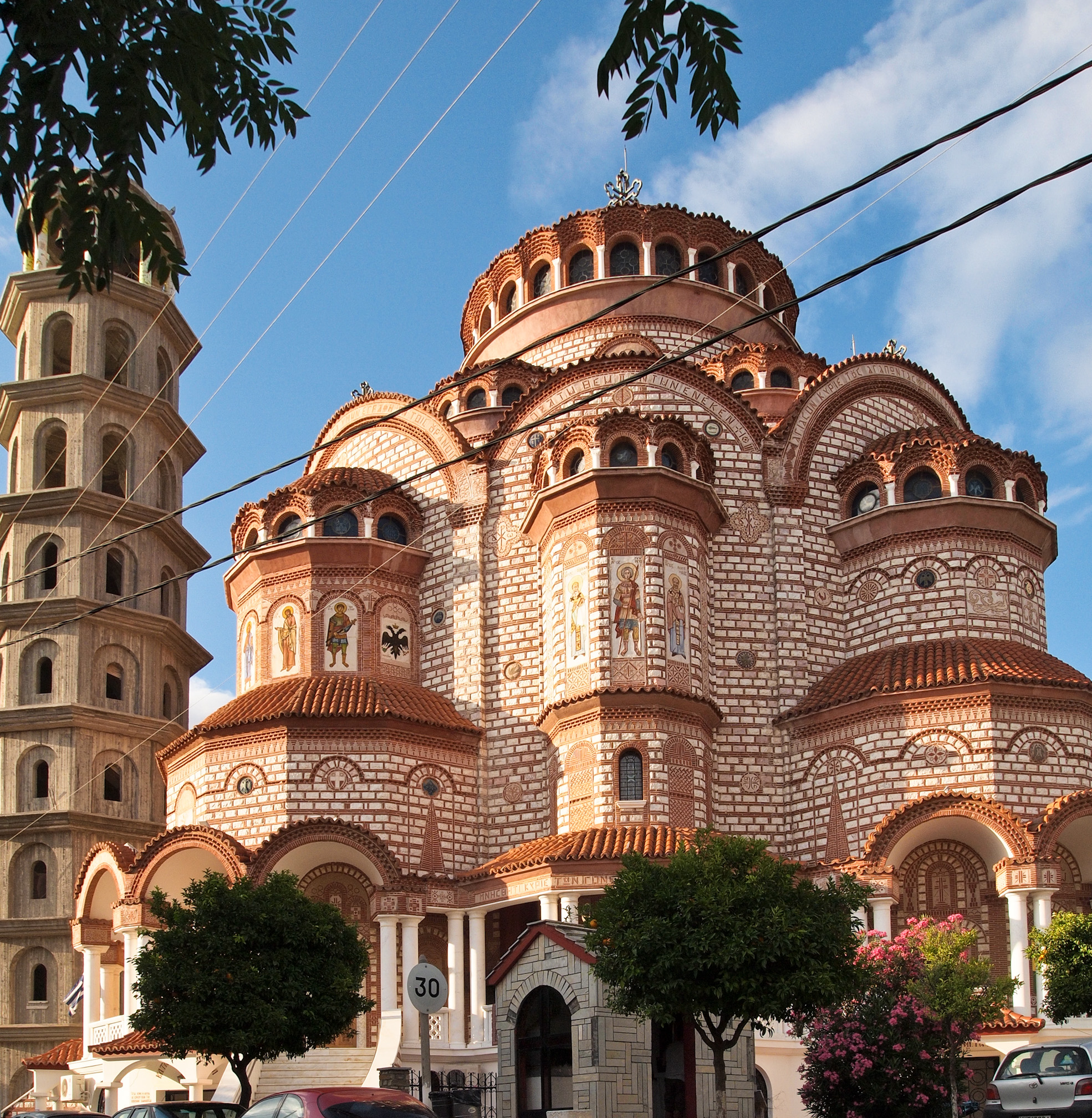
A church
