= Nea Propontida =

Nea Propontida Νέα Προποντίδα
- Municipality
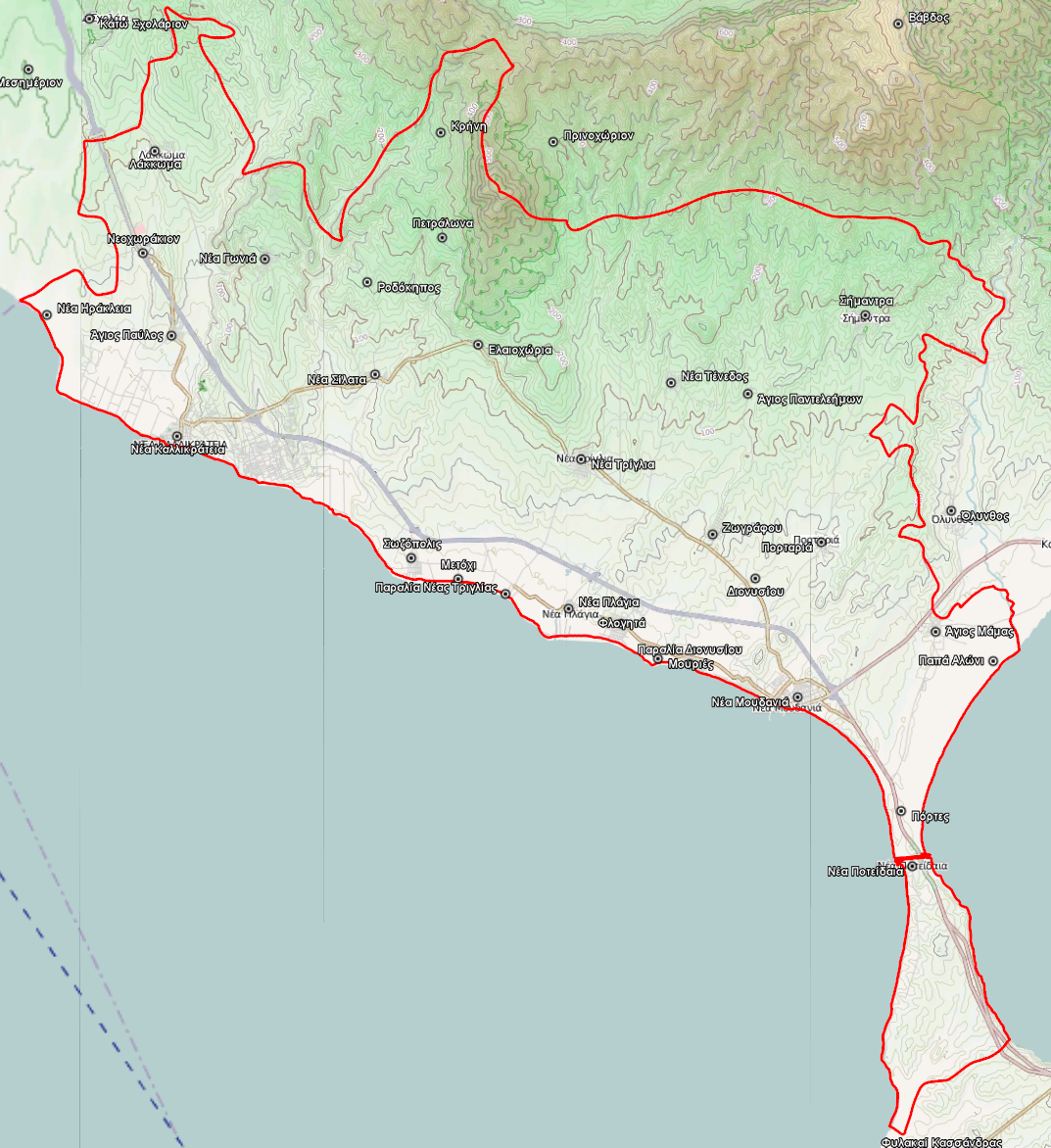

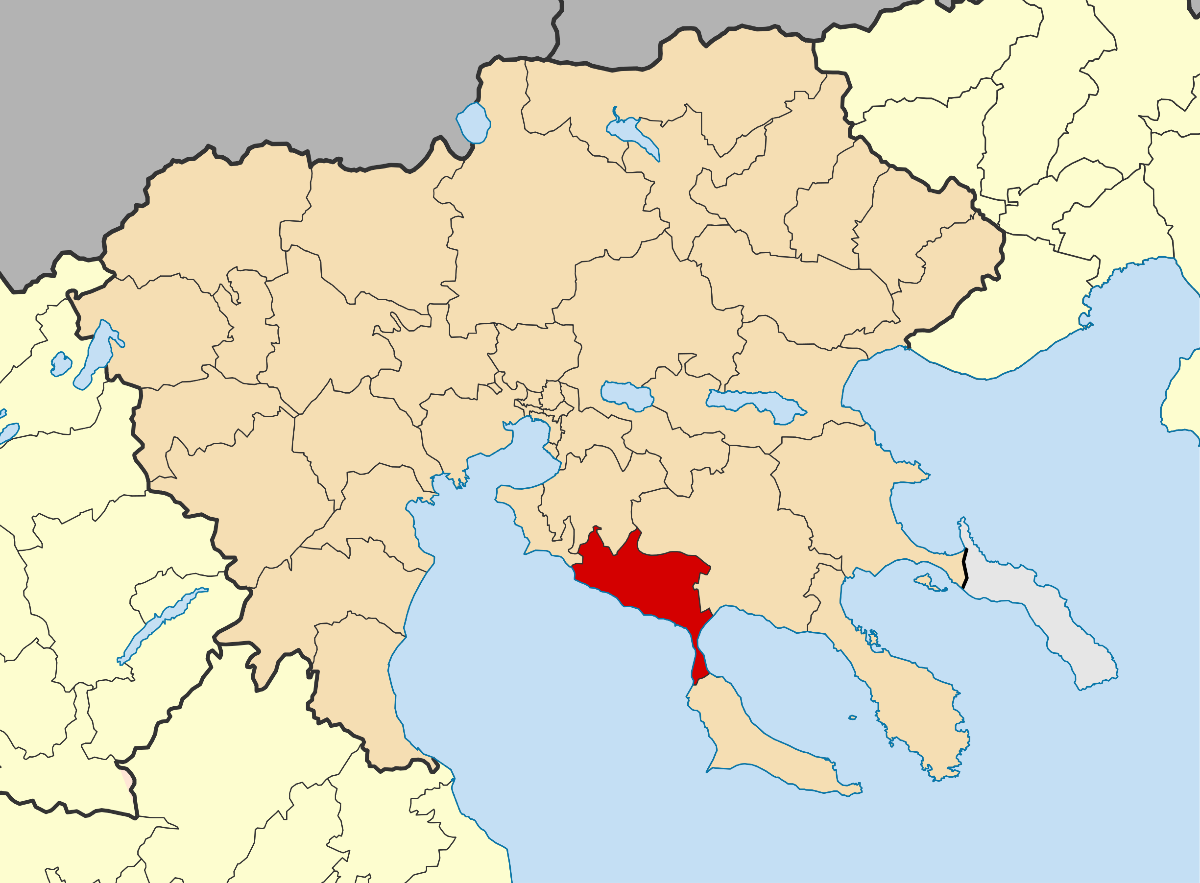

- Location within Greece
- Coordinates: 40°14′N 23°17′E
- Country: Greece
- Administrative region: Central Macedonia
- Regional unit: Chalkidiki
- Seat: Nea Moudania

Government
  - Mayor: Emmanouil Karras (since 2014)

Area
  - Municipality: 372.3 km^{2} (143.7 sq mi)

Population (2021)
  - Municipality: 34,829
  - Density: 93.55/km^{2} (242.3/sq mi)
- Time zone: UTC+2 (EET)
  - Summer (DST): UTC+3 (EEST)
- Area code: 2373, 2399
- Vehicle registration: XK
- Website: www.nea-propontida.gr

Nea Propontida (Greek: Νέα Προποντίδα, "New Propontis") is a municipality in the Chalkidiki regional unit, Central Macedonia, Greece. The seat of the municipality is the town Nea Moudania. The municipality has an area of 372.317 km^{2}.

== Municipality ==
The municipality Nea Propontida was formed at the 2011 local government reform by the merger of the following 3 former municipalities, that became municipal units:

- Kallikrateia
- Moudania
- Triglia
