= List of bus routes in Thessaloniki =

Urban, metropolitan and regional areas of Thessaloniki.

This is a list of Thessaloniki Urban Transport Organization (OASTH) contracted bus routes in Thessaloniki, Greece.

== Tickets ==
Pre-printed regular tickets may be purchased at OASTH ticket selling booths, at 1000 points of sale throughout the metropolitan area of Thessaloniki, or at ticket vending machines on-board buses. Special route tickets are only valid for the Cultural Route No 50 and AIRPORT - INTERCITY BUS TERMINAL routes No 01Χ and 01N and issued for one trip only. Tickets may be purchased from Cultural Route attendants onboard No 50 buses, or at OASTH kiosks and ticket vending machines on board the corresponding buses.

Ticket	1-trip	2-trip	3-trip	4-trip	Special
Regular	0.60	1.10	1.30	1.80	2.00
Reduced	0.30	0.55	0.70	0.90	1.00

== Classification of route numbers ==
=== Historic classification ===
When the bus system of Thessaloniki was first established in 1957 all lines were numbered from the eastern to the western routes starting with 1. This applied to all routes from 1 to 29. However, after 1979 the rest of the lines were numbered based on the date of their creation.

Route numbers	Location
1-17	East
18-29	West

=== Current classification ===
Nowadays, there is no official classification however unofficially the routes are classified as follows: trunk routes, urban routes (OASTH operated routes), metropolitan - regional routes (KTEL operated routes).

Route numbers	Type of service	Exceptions
1-50	Urban (OASTH-operated)	Lines 9 and 40 are outside Thessaloniki's urban area. Lines 1, 9, 36, 40, 42, 43 and 45 are also operated by KTEL.
51-92	Regional (KTEL-operated)	Lines 59 and 60 are within Thessaloniki's urban area. Lines 52 and 72 are operated by OASTH despite being outside Thessaloniki's urban area.
Κ-prefixed routes	Trunk routes	Lines 36K, 40K, 55K, 59K, 64K, 69K, 77K, 81K, 82K, 85K, 86K, 88K, 89K and 91K are not trunk routes.
X-prefixed routes	Airport routes	Lines 36X, 55X, 79X, 83X, 85X, 87X and 91X are not airport routes.
N-prefixed routes	Night only routes	Line 32N is not a night only route, N denotes Nosokomeio (Hospital). Lines 36N, 55N, 69N, 82N, 83N, 85N, 86N, 87N, 88N, 89N and 91N are also not night only routes.
Y-prefixed routes	Supporting express routes	Lines 1X, 45 and 83 are also express routes.
Other letter-prefixed routes	Key area the bus travels through.	

== List of routes ==
All routes operate in both directions unless detailed. Operatings hours and frequencies are based on OASTH's summer everyday schedule. NOTE: the operating hours and frequencies may defer during the weekend. Average frequencies also differ based on the time of the day, see OASTH's official site or the references for the exact times.

=== Trunk routes (Municipality of Thessaloniki) ===
Line	Special	Start	End	Letter code	Stops	Operating hours	Avg. Freq.	Operator	Ref.
1	X	KTEL Makedonia	Aerodromio	Airport	21	05:15-22:40	25'	OASTH	
1	N	KTEL Makedonia	Aerodromio	Night only	51	22:00-05:55	30'	OASTH	
2	K	IKEA	KTEL Makedonia	Trunk route	46	05:00-00:00	15'	OASTH	
2	X	Nea Elvetia	Aerodromio	Airport	5	06:00-00:30	20'	OASTH	
3	K	IKEA	Thessaloniki R.S.	Trunk route	36	05:00-00:00	10'-15'	OASTH	

=== Urban area lines ===
Line	Special	Start	End	Stops	Operating hours	Avg. Freq.	Operator
1	-	Efkarpia	KTEL	44	05:20-22:30	~30'	KTEL
1	A	Efkarpia	KTEL (through Ampelokipoi)	50	06:00-23:10	1-4hrs	KTEL
4	A	Charilaou	Kalamaria	48	06:10-19:55	~1hr	OASTH
4	B	Kalamaria	Charilaou	40	08:00-20:55	~1hr	OASTH
4	E	Kalamaria	German School of Thessaloniki	41	07:00	-	OASTH
4	M	Kalamaria	Finikas	9	13:30/14:10	-	OASTH
5	-	Nea Krini	Venizelou	33	05:00-00:00	~15	OASTH
5	A	Scholi Dikaston	Venizelou	37	07:10-20:30	2-5hrs	OASTH
5	B	Nea Krini	Venizelou (through Kalamaria)	34	05:00	-	OASTH
6	-	Kalamaria	Venizelou	38	05:15-00:00	~15	OASTH
7	-	Agios Ioannis	Panepistimio (AUoT)	38	05:10-23:50	~15'	OASTH
10	-	Charilaou	Thessaloniki railway station	23	05:00-00:00	~15'	OASTH
11	-	Pylaia	Panepistimio (AUoT)	27	05:00-23:30	~15	OASTH
11	B	Pylaia	Panepistimio (AUoT)	29	08:06-19:10	~1hr	OASTH
11	E	Pylaia	Panepistimio (AUoT)	23	05:30-19:55	~20'	OASTH
11	M	Pylaia	Panepistimio (AUoT)	28	13:20-19:40	~30'-2hrs	OASTH
12	-	KTEL	Kato Toumba	34	05:00-00:00	~15'	OASTH
14	-	Ano Toumba	Thessaloniki railway station	27	05:00-23:55	~12'	OASTH
14	A	Kliniki Genesis	Thessaloniki railway station	32	05:30-23:40	~30'	OASTH
15	-	Saranta Ekklisies	(Circular route)	34	05:45-23:30	~15'	OASTH
15	A	Saranta Ekklisies	Gymnasio	9	07:45/13:21	~6hrs	OASTH
16	-	Evangelistria	(Circular route)	39	05:50-23:30	~15'	OASTH
17	-	Triandria	Agias Sofias	15	05:00-23:40	~15'	OASTH
18	-	Agioi Anargyroi	Kordelio	45	06:15-21:00	35'-45'	OASTH
18	A	Kordelio	IEK Evosmou	12	07:45	-	OASTH
19	-	Kordelio	Thessaloniki railway station	24	05:20-00:00	~15'	OASTH
20	-	Menemeni	Ermou	19	05:00-00:00	~10'	OASTH
21	-	Evosmos	Ermou	27	05:00-00:00	~15'	OASTH
21	A	Evosmos	Ermou (through the Evosmos Cemeteries)	36	-	~2hrs	OASTH
22	-	Ano Poli	(Circular route)	43	06:05-21:40	~30'	OASTH
23	-	Thessaloniki railway station	Sykies	26	05:30-00:00	~15'	OASTH
24	-	Plateia Eleftherias	Chilia Dendra	17	06:30-23:15	~30'	OASTH
25	-	Neapoli	Venizelou	19	05:00-00:00	~15'	OASTH
26	-	Kallithea	Plateia Eleftherias	20	05:00-23:30	~15	OASTH
27	-	Stavroupoli	Panepistimio (AUoT)	30	05:00-00:05	~10'	OASTH
28	-	Efkarpia	Panepistimio (AUoT)	36	05:00-23:30	~12'	OASTH
29	-	Polichni	Aristotelous	22	05:45-23:20	~15	OASTH
29	A	Polichni	Aristotelous (through the Polichni Projects)	30	04:55-05:30	15'-20'	OASTH
30	-	Triandria	Apothiki	31	05:00-23:35	~15'	OASTH
31	-	Voulgari	KTEL	29	05:00-00:00	~10'	OASTH
32	-	Kato Ilioupoli	Aristotelous	27	05:00-23:30	~15'	OASTH
32	A	Kato Ilioupoli	Aristotelous (through Gymnastyrio)	32	05:30-23:10	~30'	OASTH
32	N	Kato Ilioupoli	Ippokrateio	44	05:45/13:45/21:45	-	OASTH
33	-	Agios Panteleimon	Venizelou	34	05:00-23:15	~10'	OASTH
33	A	Agios Panteleimon	Venizelou - Emporiko Kentro	36	08:03-20:35	2-4hrs	OASTH
33	B	Agios Panteleimon	Venizelou (through CDI)	36	08:50	-	OASTH
34	-	Ano Ilioupoli	Aristotelous	38	05:00-23:50	~12'	OASTH
35	-	Meteora	Thessaloniki railway station	25	05:35-00:05	~20'	OASTH
36	-	Voulgari	IKEA (through Cosmos, KTEL Chalkidikis)	23	05:15-19:25	60'	KTEL
36	A	Voulgari	Zoni Kainotomias (through Cosmos, IKEA)	16	22:40	-	KTEL
36	B	Voulgari	KTEL Chalkidkis (through Cosmos, IKEA)	22	21:35	-	KTEL
36	E	Voulgari	Zoni Kainotomias (through KTEL Chalkidkis, Cosmos, CEDEFOP)	18	08:35-20:15	1hr-3hrs	KTEL
36	Z	Voulgari	Zoni Kainotomias (through KTEL Chalkidikis, Cosmos, IKEA, CEDEFOP)	27	20:45	-	KTEL
36	H	Voulgari	Cosmos (through KTEL Chalkidikis, CEDEFOP, Zoni Kainotomias)	18	07:35/16:15	-	KTEL
36	K	Voulgari	KTEL Chalkidikis (through Cosmos)	14	05:15-19:15	30'-60'	KTEL
36	N	Voulgari	Cosmos	7	09:45/21:05/22:00	-	KTEL
36	P	Voulgari	Zoni Kainotomias (through Cosmos, IKEA)	14	07:35-20:15	~30'-4hrs	KTEL
36	T	Voulgari	KTEL Chalkidikis	7	09:35/15:00	-	KTEL
36	Y	Voulgari	Zoni Kainotomias (through Cosmos)	15	20:45	-	KTEL
37	-	Thessaloniki railway station	Kryoneri	20	05:35-23:00	~15'	OASTH
38	-	Efkarpia	Aristotelous	34	05:00-23:05	~15'	OASTH
39	-	Kifisia	Dikastiria	32	05:20-23:20	~15'	OASTH
39	A	Kifisia	Dikastiria - Emporiko Kentro	34	20:08/21:00/22:40	-	OASTH
39	B	Kifisia	Dikastiria (through CDI)	34	8:26/18:20	-	OASTH
42	-	Kordelio	Koimitiria Evosmou (Cemeteries)	25	05:30-19:00	~70'-90'	KTEL
42	A	Menemeni	Koimitiria Evosmou (Cemeteries)	30	17:00 (everyday) / 9:10 (Sunday)	-	KTEL
42	B	Ampelokipoi	Koimitiria Evosmou (Cemeteries)	39	9:10 (Saturday)	-	KTEL
45	-	KTEL Makedonia	KTEL Halkidiki - Cosmos	12	4:40-20:50	~1hr	KTEL
45	A	KTEL Makedonia	KTEL Halkidiki	11	05:00-21:30	20'-40'	KTEL
45	B	KTEL Makedonia	Cosmos - KTEL Halkidiki	11	15:20-20:50 (sat-sun)	~1hr	KTEL

==== Temporary express lines ====
In 2023, the Transport Authority of Thessaloniki started operating 4 special temporary express lines until the "Flyover" road of Thessaloniki was complete, presumably in 2028.

Line	Special	Start	End	Stops	Operating hours	Avg. Freq.	Operator	Ref.
36	Χ	IKEA	Triandria	39	06:40-14:50	20'-25'	KTEL	
43	Y	Evosmos	Voulgari	13	06:50-14:45	20'-25'	KTEL	
45	Y	KTEL Makedonia	IKEA	17	06:50-15:00	20'-25'	KTEL	
55	Y	Stavroupoli - KTEL	Thessaloniki railway station	16	06:40-14:45	20-25'	KTEL	

==== Local lines ====
Line	Special	Name	Area	Stops	Operating hours	Avg. Freq.	Operator
11	T	Pylaia - Charilaou	Pylaia	14	06:45-21:05	~45'	OASTH
43	-	Topiko Evosmou	Evosmos	35	06:00-21:00	1hr	KTEL
53	-	Topiko Sindou	Sindos	36	05:10-22:00	40'-70'	KTEL
53	A	Topiko Sindou - Industrial Area District C	Sindos	17	07:00-22:00	40'-70'	KTEL
53	B	Industrial Area District C - A.T.E.I. of Thessaloniki (through Sindos railway station)	Sindos	22	07:00-08:45	30'-60'	KTEL
53	Σ (S)	Industrial Area District C - A.T.E.I. of Thessaloniki (through Sindos railway station)	Sindos	22	14:35-17:35	~30'-60'	KTEL
55	-	Stavroupoli - Oraiokastro	Oraiokastro	51	05:10-20:00	40'-60'	KTEL
55	A	Stavroupoli - Gymnasio	Oraiokastro	50	07:30	-	KTEL
55	T	Oraiokastro - Neochorouda	Oraiokastro	2	07:55	-	KTEL
59	-	Topiko Pefkon	Pefka	41	7:00-22:00	20'-40'	KTEL
59	A	Gymnasio Pefkon (Circular)	Pefka	45	7:45	-	KTEL
59	B	Gymnasio Pefkon	Pefka	31	13:10-13:55	45'	KTEL
59	K	Topiko Pefkon - Cemetery	Pefka	42	10:35-16:40	50'-55'	KTEL
60	A	Oikismos Makedonia (through Makedonomachon)	Panorama	53	7:20-22:30	1hr	KTEL
60	B	Oikismos Makedonia (through Ionos Dragoumi)	Panorama	52	7:20-22:30	1hr	KTEL

==== Tour line (Cultural Line) ====
Line	Name	Start	End	Stops	Operating hours	Avg. Freq.	Operator	Ref.
50	Politistiki Grammi (Cultural Line)	White Tower	(Circular route)	16	10:00-16:30	1hr	OASTH	

=== Metropolitan area lines ===
Line	Special	Start	End	Stops	Operating hours	Operator
9	-	Thessaloniki railway station	Kentriki Agora	50	05:25-21:00	KTEL
9	A	Thessaloniki railway station	Kentriki Agora	51	06:15-16:50	KTEL
9	B	Thessaloniki railway station	Kentriki Agora through KTEO	35	17:10-22:30	KTEL
9	E	Thessaloniki railway station	Kentriki Agora (through KTEO)	36	17:30-21:55	KTEL
40	-	Thessaloniki railway station	Kalochori	33	05:35-23:00	KTEL
40	A	Thessaloniki railway station	Kalochori (through SDOE)	32	06:00-19:30	KTEL
40	K	Thessaloniki railway station	Kalochori (through Roumbopoulos)	24	06:45-20:16	KTEL
51	-	Thessaloniki railway station	Sindos	47	05:20-23:40	KTEL
51	A	Sindos	Anatoliko	26	05:35	KTEL
51	B	Thessaloniki railway station	Sindos (through Industrial Area of Thessaloniki)	54	05:50	KTEL
52	-	Thessaloniki railway station	A.T.E.I. of Thessaloniki (through Sindos)	13	06:30-23:20	OASTH
52	A	Thessaloniki railway station	A.T.E.I. of Thessaloniki	10	07:15-10:41	OASTH
52	B	Aristotelous Square	Sindos (Industrial Area of Thessaloniki)	28	06:00/07:00	OASTH
54	-	Thessaloniki railway station	Ionia	46	05:00-23:30	KTEL
54	A	Thessaloniki railway station	Ionia (through Agios Athanasios)	47	09:05-19:20	KTEL
55	B	Stavroupoli	Palaia Simahiki	43	07:50-20:15	KTEL
55	E	Stavroupoli	Filothei	12	06:00-21:00	KTEL
55	K	Stavroupoli	Ionia	44	05:30-14:15	KTEL
55	M	Stavroupoli	Koimitiria - Ionia	45	10:45 (Saturday)	KTEL
55	N	Stavroupoli	Ionia - Koimitiria	45	09:40 (weekends)	KTEL
55	P	Stavroupoli	Neochorouda	19	09:35/11:20/15:30	KTEL
55	T	Oraiokastro	Neochorouda (High School of Kallithea)	2	07:55/14:15	KTEL
55	X	Stavroupoli	Domi - Thessaloniki Railway Station	45	07:30-20:30	KTEL
56	-	Thessaloniki railway station	Oraiokastro	45	05:20-23:30	KTEL
56	A	Thessaloniki railway station	Gymnasio	48	07:41/07:55/14:05	KTEL
57	-	Diastavrosi Chortiati	Thessaloniki railway station	48	05:15-23:30	KTEL
58	-	Diastavrosi Chortiati	Venizelou	40	05:35-23:36	KTEL
58	B	Diastavrosi Chortiati	Nea Elvetia	33	05:20-23:46	KTEL
61	-	Chortiatis	Diastavrosi	16	05:50-00:30	KTEL
61	A	Chortiatis	Diastavrosi - Lykeio	21	07:05/08:03/13:25/14:09	KTEL
64	-	Thessaloniki railway station	Filiro	31	05:00-23:30	KTEL
64	A	Thessaloniki railway station	Filiro - Paidiko Horio	44	06:50/10:00/14:40	KTEL
64	B	Thessaloniki railway station	Filiro - Hristianiki Elpida	33	16:55/17:20	KTEL
64	E	Thessaloniki railway station	Filiro - Lykeio	32	07:15-14:15	KTEL
64	K	Thessaloniki railway station	Filiro - Paidiko Horio - Lykeio	45	07:35	KTEL
66	-	Charilaou	Thermi	24	05:45-23:05	KTEL
67	-	IKEA	Triadi	22	05:20-23:40	KTEL
67	A	Triadi	Keramourgeia - IKEA	24	22:55	KTEL
67	B	IKEA	Triadi - Diethnes Panepistimio	23	14:25-16:50	KTEL
68	A	IKEA	Diethnes Panepistimio - Keramourgeia	18	12:50-21:15	KTEL
68	B	IKEA	OAED - Lakkia	55	14:50	KTEL
69	A	IKEA	Epanomi - Paralia	45	05:00-23:45	KTEL
69	B	IKEA	Epanomi - Palioura	52	05:25-22:40	KTEL
69	H	IKEA	Epanomi			KTEL
69	K	IKEA	Epanomi - Paralia - IEK	55	18:50-22:35	KTEL
69	N	IKEA	Epanomi - Ntouraki	54	06:35/14:35/20:55	KTEL
69	P	IKEA	Epanomi - IEK - Ntouraki	55	14:35	KTEL
69	T	IKEA	Epanomi - IEK - Paralia	53	07:50-15:15	KTEL
70	-	Thessaloniki railway station	Epanomi - Epanomi Beach			KTEL
70	A	Thessaloniki railway station	Epanomi - Alykes			KTEL
71	-	Thessaloniki railway station	Michaniona			KTEL
71	A	Thessaloniki railway station	Michaniona (through Angelochori)			KTEL
72	-	IKEA	Michaniona	53	05:00-00:00	OASTH
72	A	IKEA	Michaniona (through Angelochori)	66	06:19-23:35	OASTH
72	B	IKEA	Angelochori - Michaniona - Kentro Ygias	68	08:25	OASTH
72	E	IKEA	Michaniona - Kentro Ygias	55	08:05-12:58	OASTH
76	-	IKEA	Angelochori	46	05:20-20:45	KTEL
76	Α	Angelochori	Michaniona	16	15:55-21:50	KTEL
76	B	IKEA	Angelochori (through T.E.L. and I.E.K.)	47	13:10	KTEL
76	Σ (S)	IKEA	Agia Triada	31	13:55	KTEL
77	-	Michaniona	Epanomi	48	06:30-21:30	KTEL
77	A	Michaniona	Epanomi (through Gymnaseum, Lyceum, I.E.K., T.E.E.)	51	07:35	KTEL
77	B	Michaniona	Epanomi (through I.E.K., T.E.E.)	49	14:40/16:00/20:00	KTEL
77	E	Michaniona	Epanomi (through Gymnaseum, Lyceum)	51	13:30	KTEL
77	H	Epanomi	Potamos			KTEL
77	K	Michaniona	Epanomi (through I.E.K.)	50	19:20/20:35/22:15	KTEL
79	-	IKEA	Aerodromio	5	05:55-23:05	KTEL
79	A	IKEA	Aerodromio - KTEL Halkidikis			KTEL
79	B	KTEL Halkidikis	Aerodromio - IKEA			KTEL
79	E	IKEA	Aerodromio - Cosmos	9	08:35-23:15	KTEL
79	K	IKEA	Aerodromio - Cosmos - KTEL Halkidikis			KTEL
79	X	IKEA	Nea Elvetia	7	05:50-00:16	KTEL

=== Regional area lines ===
Line	Special	Start	End	Stops	Operating hours	Avg. Freq.	Operator
80	-	Thessaloniki	Malgara	35	06:20-21:00	25'-60'	KTEL
80	A	KTEL	Malgara (through Anatoliko)	42	06:00-22:15	~75'	KTEL
80	B	Malgara	KTEL (through Anatoliko)	43	05:15-21:45	90'-120'	KTEL
80	E	KTEL	Malgara (through Ionia)	65	07:32	-	KTEL
80	Z	KTEL - Malgara	Ionia - Anatoliko	72	15:57	-	KTEL
81	A	KTEL	Agios Athanasios	58	05:00-23:05	20'-40'	KTEL
81	B	Koufalia	KTEL	59	05:05-23:00	20'-40'	KTEL
81	K	Valtochori	KTEL	43	08:05/17:00	-	KTEL
82	A	Neochorouda	Pentalofos	60	05:00-23:00	~2hrs	KTEL
82	B	Pentalofos	Neochorouda	61	06:00-21:00	2-3hrs	KTEL
82	E	KTEL	Monolofos	53	06:30-20:30	2-4hrs	KTEL
82	K	Monolofos	KTEL	58	05:30-21:30	2-3hrs	KTEL
82	M	KTEL	Monolofos	58	14:05/18:30	-	KTEL
82	N	Monolofos	KTEL	63	19:30	-	KTEL
83	-	Lagkadas	Thessaloniki	20	05:30-23:30	~20'-60'	KTEL
83	A	Analipsi	Thessaloniki	45	05:40	-	KTEL
83	B	Lagkadas - Lagyna	Thessaloniki	40	06:20-23:00	~1hr	KTEL
83	M	Thessaloniki	Lagkadas (through Loutra)	43	08:15-19:40	2-4hrs	KTEL
83	N	Stavroupoli	Lagkadas	40	07:15-20:55	~2hrs	KTEL
83	T	Thessaloniki	Lagkadas (through I.E.K.)	30	07:20-13:22	~6hrs	KTEL
83	X	Chrisavgi - Lagkadas	Thessaloniki	31	05:35	-	KTEL
84	A	Thessaloniki	Melissochori	43	04:45-22:30	~1hr	KTEL
84	B	Thessaloniki	Drymos	53	04:20-22:05	~1hr	KTEL
85	-	Thessaloniki	Evangelistria	69	05:25/16:00/21:20	-	KTEL
85	A	Thessaloniki	Krithia	44	10:20-22:00	2-5hrs	KTEL
85	B	Thessaloniki	Lefkochori	70	08:35/19:00	-	KTEL
85	Z	Thessaloniki	Krithia-Evangelistria	90	06:40/13:30	-	KTEL
85	H	Lagkadas	Evangelistria	50	10:55/14:30	-	KTEL
85	K	Thessaloniki	Kidonia-Evangelistria	72	16:00 (Friday)	-	KTEL
85	M	Thessaloniki	Eksamili-Krithia	44	11:15/12:35/17:40	-	KTEL
85	N	Thessaloniki	Nikopoli-Evangelistria	79	7:30/18:25	-	KTEL
85	T	Thessaloniki	Eksamili-Lefkochori	72	06:00	-	KTEL
85	X	Thessaloniki	Mavrorrachi-Evangelistria	69	16:00 (sat-sun)	-	KTEL
86	-	Thessaloniki	Lagkadikia (return)	46	6:20-23:00	45'-90'	KTEL
86	A	Gerakarou	Lagkadikia (transition)	44	09:32-22:05	2-5hrs	KTEL
86	B	Vasiloudi	Lagkadikia (transition)	40	07:00-21:05	~90'	KTEL
86	E	Lagyna	Vasiloudi- Lagkadikia (transition)	44	20:28	-	KTEL
86	K	Lagyna	Gerakarou-Lagkadikia (transition)	48	06:10-16:57	2-6hrs	KTEL
86	M	Ardameri	Gerakarou-Lagkadikia (transition)	50	16:20/17:50	-	KTEL
86	N	Lagyna-Ardameri	Gerakarou-Lagkadikia (transition)	54	05:05	-	KTEL
86	P	Ardameri	Lagkadikia (transition)	45	10:20	-	KTEL
86	T	Lagkadikia-Lagyna	Thessaloniki (return)	51	05:10-21:23	3-6hrs	KTEL
87	A	Rysio	Vasilika	52	05:00-22:30	1-2hrs	KTEL
87	B	IKEA	Vasilika (through Raidestos, Peristera, Livadi)	90	05:10	-	KTEL
87	Γ (G)	Vasilika	Agios Antonios	35	08:10	-	KTEL
87	E	Raidestos	Vasilika	36	05:20-22:45	60'	KTEL
87	Z	Vasilika	Livadi	72	08:30/15:45/20:10	-	KTEL
87	H	IKEA	Lakia	50	15:00/20:20	-	KTEL
87	Θ (Th)	IKEA	Rysio	79	14:30	-	KTEL
87	Λ (L)	IKEA	Raidestos	45	07:25-19:35	2-3hrs	KTEL
87	M	IKEA	Monopigado	72	6:30	-	KTEL
87	N	IKEA	Agios Antonis	64	15:30	-	KTEL
87	Π (P)	IKEA	Peristera (transition)	70	12:25	-	KTEL
87	P	IKEA	Tagarades	55	08:55/13:40/21:00	-	KTEL
87	T	IKEA	Tagarades-Ag. Antonis	67	13:35/21:30	-	KTEL
87	Φ (F)	IKEA	Filothei	41	10:55/17:10	-	KTEL
87	X	Vasilika	Monopigado	76	21:05	-	KTEL
88	-	IKEA	Mesimeri	52	5:10-21:45	1-6hrs	KTEL
88	A	IKEA	Trilofos	52	9:30-17:35	-	KTEL
88	B	IKEA	Kardia	57	7:40-22:40	2-3hrs	KTEL
88	E	IKEA	Mesimeri (through Hita)	67	16:35/20:35	-	KTEL
88	H	IKEA	Epanomi	69	07:00-18:10	~3hrs	KTEL
88	K	IKEA	Mesimeri	54	05:45-23:45	4-10hrs	KTEL
88	M	IKEA	Lakoma	59	15:35	-	KTEL
88	N	IKEA	Mesimeri	61	21:10	-	KTEL
89	A	KTEL	Ksirochori	46	05:35-21:45	20'-60'	KTEL
89	B	KTEL	Akropotamos (transition)	73	05:55-15:50	~3hrs	KTEL
89	E	Akropotamos	KTEL (return)	71	10:20-22:50	2-5hrs	KTEL
89	K	Agioneri	Akropotamos (transition)	70	06:45-21:40	1-2hrs	KTEL
89	N	Akropotamos	Agioneri (return)	68	05:30-21:35	2-3hrs	KTEL
90	-	Koufalia	Malgara	41	13:00	-	KTEL
90	A	Loudias	Malgara	38	04:55-19:05	~2hrs	KTEL
90	B	Akropotamos	Malgara	61	09:25/17:10	-	KTEL
90	E	Akropotamos	Koufalia	23	09:28/12:53/17:05	-	KTEL
91	A	Lagkadas	Analipsi	34	05:20-21:40	~1hr	KTEL
91	B	Lagkadas	Analipsi (through T.E.E. Lagkada)	40	14:00	-	KTEL
91	E	Lagkadas	Krithia	28	07:35/13:45/19:55	-	KTEL
91	H	Lagkadas	Irakleio-Perivolaki	66	06:00-22:00	~1hr	KTEL
91	K	Lagkadas	Kavallari	43	05:50-21:35	1-7hrs	KTEL
91	N	Lagkadas	Oik. Papakyriazi	9	15:40/21:15	-	KTEL
91	T	Lagkadas	Lagkadikia	53	06:50-19:50	1-4hrs	KTEL
91	Y	Chrysavgi	Analipsi	39	07:33-21:08	~1hr	KTEL
91	X	Lagkadas	Chrysavgi	11	6:10-22:05	30'-50'	KTEL
92	-	Koufalia - Athira	Rahona	19	05:50/20:30	-	KTEL
92	A	Koufalia	Athira	11	06:45-20:00	40'-70'	KTEL
92	E	Koufalia	Ergatikes	9	06:30-20:20	1-3hrs	KTEL
92	P	Koufalia	Rahona	12	07:00-19:40	1-3hrs	KTEL

== Former routes ==
Line	Route	Established	Withdrawn	Ref.
2	Apothiki-Venizelou	1956	2017	
3	Votsi-Venizelou	1956	2017	
8	Martiou-Sfageia	1956	2017	
27A	Stavroupoli-Gymnasio	-	2021	
27B	Stavroupoli-OAED	-	2021	
28A	Efkarpia-Papageorgiou-Panepistimio	2000	2024	
28B	Efkarpia-Papageorgiou-Panepistimio	2000	2024	
41	Neapoli-Nos. Papageorgiou	2004	2010	
44	Istoriko Kentro	2024	2025	
57Y	Diastavrosi Hortiati - Aristotelous	2020	2020	
78	KTEL-Aerodromio	1979	2018	
