= Lagkadikia =

Lagkadikia Λαγκαδίκια
- Community
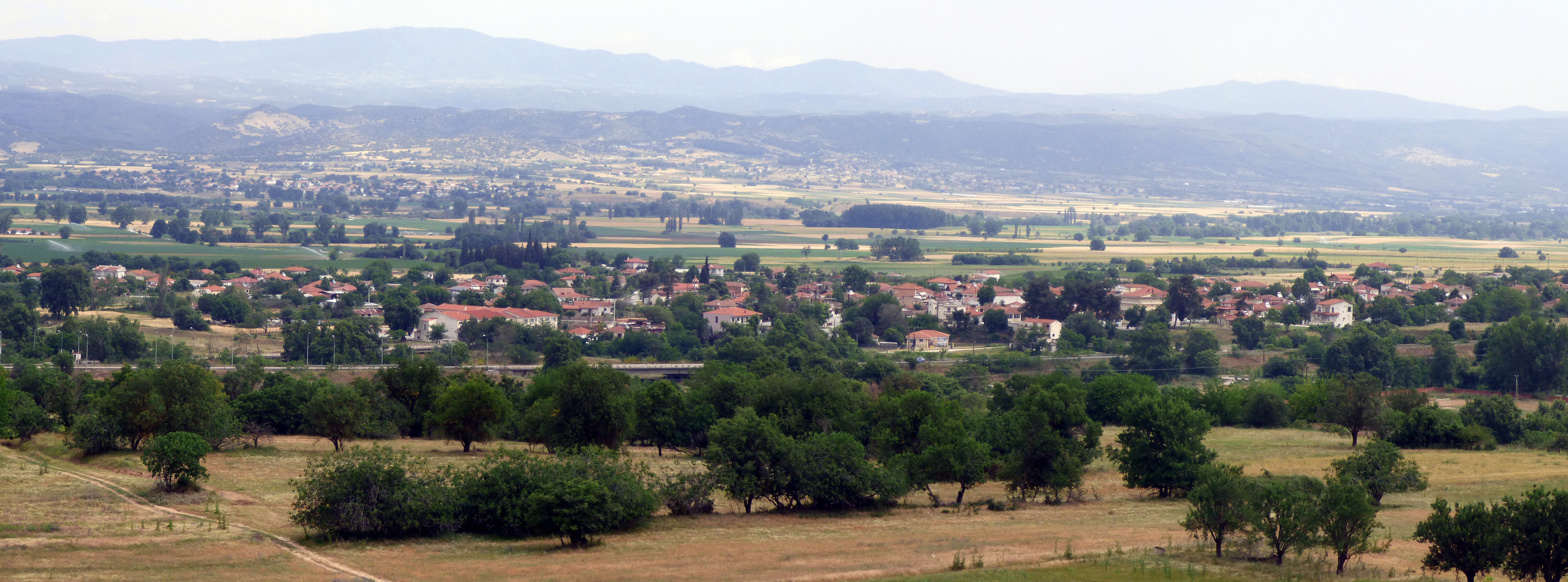
- Village Lagkadikia as seen from southwest

- Location within Greece
- Coordinates: 40°38′9″N 23°14′48″E
- Country: Greece
- Administrative region: Central Macedonia
- Regional unit: Thessaloniki
- Municipality: Lagkadas
- Municipal unit: Koroneia

Population (2021)
  - Community: 798
- Time zone: UTC+2 (EET)
  - Summer (DST): UTC+3 (EEST)

Lagkadikia (Greek: Λαγκαδίκια, Lagkadíkia) is a village located in the regional unit of Thessaloniki, in Greece, north-east of Mount Chortiatis. It has facilities such as "Langadikia High School" (Gymnasium-Lyceum) and "Agronomy Department" that are used by many surrounding villages, as it is located on a cross-road between Lake Koroneia and Lake Volvi. The village has about 800 permanent inhabitants. It is part of the municipal unit of Koroneia, which contains also the villages Agios Vasileios, Gerakarou, Vasiloudi, and Ardameri.

== Location ==
Langadikia is located 36 km east from Thessaloniki and at the only road that connects the old National road to the A2 motorway. Visitors have three choices in order to reach the village:

- Through the Egnatia motorway
- Through the old national road Thessaloniki-Kavala
- Through Panorama-Hortiatis
