= Petroto, Thessaloniki =

Petroto Πετρωτό
- Settlement
- Location within Greece
- Coordinates: 40°48.8′N 22°52.3′E
- Country: Greece
- Administrative region: Central Macedonia
- Regional unit: Thessaloniki
- Municipality: Oraiokastro
- Municipal unit: Kallithea
- Community: Mesaio
- Elevation: 80 m (260 ft)

Population (2021)
  - Total: 239
- Time zone: UTC+2 (EET)
  - Summer (DST): UTC+3 (EEST)
- Postal code: 545 00
- Area code: +30-231
- Vehicle registration: NA to NX

Petroto (Greek: Πετρωτό, [petro'to]) is a village of the Oraiokastro municipality. The village was part of the municipality of Kallithea before the 2011 local government reform. Petroto is a part of the community of Mesaio.

The 2021 census recorded 239 inhabitants in the village.

== See also ==
- List of settlements in the Thessaloniki regional unit
