= Mesaio =

Mesaio Μεσαίο
- Community
- Location within Greece
- Coordinates: 40°47.7′N 22°51.9′E
- Country: Greece
- Administrative region: Central Macedonia
- Regional unit: Thessaloniki
- Municipality: Oraiokastro
- Municipal unit: Kallithea

Area
  - Community: 27.896 km^{2} (10.771 sq mi)
- Elevation: 174 m (571 ft)

Population (2021)
  - Community: 1,063
  - Density: 38.11/km^{2} (98.69/sq mi)
- Time zone: UTC+2 (EET)
  - Summer (DST): UTC+3 (EEST)
- Postal code: 545 00
- Area code: +30-231
- Vehicle registration: NA to NX

Mesaio (Greek: Μεσαίο) is a village and a community of the Oraiokastro municipality. Before the 2011 local government reform it was part of the municipality of Kallithea, of which it was a municipal district. The 2021 census recorded 1,063 inhabitants in the community. The community of Mesaio covers an area of 27.896 km^{2}.

== Administrative division ==
The community of Mesaio consists of three separate settlements:

- Mesaio (population 517 in 2021)
- Monolofo (population 307)
- Petroto (population 239)

== See also ==
- List of settlements in the Thessaloniki regional unit
