= Agios Antonios =

Agios Antonios (Greek: Άγιος Αντώνιος) in Greek refers to Saint Anthony. It may also refer to a number of places named after him:

- Agios Antonios (Limassol), a quarter of Limassol, Cyprus
- Ayios Antonios, Nicosia, a neighbourhood of Nicosia, Cyprus
- Agios Antonios, Kastoria, a village in Macedonia, Greece
- Agios Antonios, Thessaloniki, a village in the Thermi municipality, Greece
- Agios Antonios metro station, a station of the Athens Metro
