= Chortiatis (disambiguation) =

Chortiatis can refer to:

- Mount Chortiatis, a mountain in Greece
- Chortiatis, the town on the foot of the above mountain
- The Massacre of Chortiatis, a World War II war crime
