= Republic 100.3 =

- Thessaloniki; Greece
- Broadcast area: Central Macedonia
- Frequency: 100.3 MHz

Programming
- Language: Greek

Ownership
- Owner: Metromedia Group S.A.
- Sister stations: ZOO 90.8 and Velvet 96.8; Athletic Metropolis 95.5

History
- First air date: 1996 (as Planet); 2005 (as Republic); 2019 (as Transistor)
- Former call signs: Planet / Republic

Links
- Website: republicradio.gr tranzistor1003.gr

Republic 100.3 was a local music radio station, based in Pylaia, Thessaloniki, Greece. The station was originally launched in 1996 as Planet. Ιn 2005, it was renamed as Republic and in 2019 split into two radio stations. Republic switched to internet radio while 100.3 FM replaced by Transistor (or Tranzistor).

== History ==
Republic was founded in 2005 by a group of people that loved freedom and democracy in music, independent speaking on-air and finally, that wanted to bring a genre of music that Thessaloniki city was missing. It is also a pure music station focusing on the sophisticated and eclectic style of sounds. The radio was also a big fan base out of Thessaloniki city with listeners through the internet. In 2016 it has become a zero talk radio and changed its format.

Republic Radio and Transistor 100.3 are part of a media group named Metromedia.
