= Kastanas =

Kastanas Καστανάς
- Settlement
- Location within Greece
- Coordinates: 40°49.1′N 22°39.5′E
- Country: Greece
- Administrative region: Central Macedonia
- Regional unit: Thessaloniki
- Municipality: Chalkidona
- Municipal unit: Koufalia
- Community: Prochoma
- Elevation: 35 m (115 ft)

Population (2021)
  - Total: 483
- Time zone: UTC+2 (EET)
  - Summer (DST): UTC+3 (EEST)
- Postal code: 570 11
- Area code: +30-231
- Vehicle registration: NA to NX

Kastanas (Greek: Καστανάς, [kasta'nas]) is a village of the Chalkidona municipality. Before the 2011 local government reform it was part of the municipality of Koufalia. The 2021 census recorded 483 inhabitants in the village. Kastanas is a part of the community of Prochoma.

== History ==
The population of Kastanas consists mainly of Greek refugees from İzmit, but there are also smaller numbers of Sarakatsani and Greek refugees from Bulgaria. The village was formerly known as Kara Oglu (Greek: Καρά Ογλού, [ka'ɾa o'ɣlu], from Turkish: Kara Oğlu).

== See also ==
- List of settlements in the Thessaloniki regional unit
