= Monolofo =

Monolofo Μονόλοφο
- Settlement
- Location within Greece
- Coordinates: 40°48.2′N 22°54.5′E
- Country: Greece
- Administrative region: Central Macedonia
- Regional unit: Thessaloniki
- Municipality: Oraiokastro
- Municipal unit: Kallithea
- Community: Mesaio
- Elevation: 120 m (390 ft)

Population (2021)
  - Total: 307
- Time zone: UTC+2 (EET)
  - Summer (DST): UTC+3 (EEST)
- Postal code: 545 00
- Area code: +30-231
- Vehicle registration: NA to NX

Monolofo (Greek: Μονόλοφο, [mo'nolofo]) is a village of the Oraiokastro municipality. Before the 2011 local government reform it was part of the municipality of Kallithea. The 2021 census recorded 307 inhabitants in the village. Monolofo is a part of the community of Mesaio.

== See also ==
- List of settlements in the Thessaloniki regional unit
