= Ardameri =

Village in Central Macedonia, Greece

Ardameri Αρδαμέρι
- Community
- Location within Greece
- Coordinates: 40°35′39″N 23°11′0″E
- Country: Greece
- Administrative region: Central Macedonia
- Regional unit: Thessaloniki
- Municipality: Lagkadas
- Municipal unit: Koroneia

Population (2021)
  - Community: 175
- Time zone: UTC+2 (EET)
  - Summer (DST): UTC+3 (EEST)

Ardameri (Greek: Αρδαμέρι, Turkish: Edremir) is a village in the regional unit of Thessaloniki of Greece, at the foot of Mount Chortiatis, on the site of the medieval settlement of Ardamerion (Αρδαμέριον).

== History ==
Ardamerium itself was destroyed during the Ottoman conquest of Thessaloniki in 1430. It was again destroyed in the 1821 suppression of the Macedonian uprising, led by Emmanouel Pappas, during the Greek War of Independence.

The modern village is situated 38 km east of Thessaloniki. It is part of the municipal unit of Koroneia, which also includes the villages of Agios Vasileios, Gerakarou, Vasiloudi and Lagkadikia.

It is a traditional Greek village with scattered houses and a maze of pathways often leading to a dead end. The village has some 900 registered voters, but only 125 permanent inhabitants.

== Ecclesiastical history ==
As a city in the Roman province of Macedonia Prima, it was important enough to become a suffragan bishopric of the Metropolis of Thessalonica.

In the Notitia Episcopatuum of Byzantine Emperor Leo VI the Wise (886–912) the bishopric of "Herculea, that is Ardamerion" is mentioned as the seventh in rank among the sees subordinate to Thessalonica.

Bishop Meletius, who signed the acts of the 1638 synod in Constantinople that condemned Cyril Lucaris for not having disowned the Calvinist Eastern Confession of the Christian Faith attributed to him, was bishop of Ardameri.

Today it is part of the Metropolis of Ierissos, Mount Athos and Ardameri, which depends from the Ecumenical Patriarchate of Constantinople in the "New Lands" of Greece, administered by the Church of Greece.

In 1933, "Ardamerium" (Italian: Ardamerio) was established by the Catholic Church as a titular see. It has never had an incumbent.
