= Filyro =

Filyro Φίλυρο
- Community
- Location within Greece
- Coordinates: 40°41′28″N 23°00′15″E
- Country: Greece
- Administrative region: Central Macedonia
- Regional unit: Thessaloniki
- Municipality: Pylaia–Chortiatis
- Municipal unit: Chortiatis

Population (2021)
  - Community: 5,531
- Time zone: UTC+2 (EET)
  - Summer (DST): UTC+3 (EEST)

Filyro (Greek: Φίλυρο) is a suburban village located 10 km northeast from the city of Thessaloniki, Greece. It is part of the municipality Pylaia–Chortiatis, and is located at the northwest end of Mount Chortiatis.
