= Neochorouda =

Neochorouda Νεοχωρούδα
- Community
- Location within Greece
- Coordinates: 40°44′N 22°53′E
- Country: Greece
- Administrative region: Central Macedonia
- Regional unit: Thessaloniki
- Municipality: Oraiokastro
- Municipal unit: Kallithea

Population (2021)
  - Community: 2,844
- Time zone: UTC+2 (EET)
  - Summer (DST): UTC+3 (EEST)

Neochorouda (Greek: Νεοχωρούδα) is a village in the Oraiokastro municipality, Thessaloniki regional unit, northern Greece. It was formerly known as Tria Hania (Greek: Τρία Χάνια, Turkish: Üç Hanlar, both mean "three inns"). The village itself was built on the crossroads of the road between Kilkis and Athens and thus saw a lot of traffic, hence the name. It was situated in the swamps near the lake of Giannitsa. It was abandoned during the Turkish rule of Macedonia, most likely in lieu of a better position, away from the swamps. Today the village is abandoned. The new village was named Neochorouda (Νεοχωρούδα), which literally means “new village”. Neochorouda is situated north-west of Thessaloniki, on the southern slopes of Mount Kardakli (Καρδακλί).

It is disputed whether Neochorouda pre-existed Tria Hania, or not, but it is clear today that the inhabitants of Tria Hania do, in fact, to this day reside in Neochorouda.

== History of the area ==
During the Macedonian struggle the area was a hotbed for partisan activity as Greek, Bulgarian and other nationality paramilitaries as well as Ottoman soldiers waged a covert war for the allegiance of the native populations either “converting” people to their national identity, or exterminating them as the supporters of others. Due to this reason Macedonia had, up until a generation ago at most, a large concentration of Bulgarian-speaking villages, whose inhabitants nevertheless subscribed strongly to their Greek identity.

== In popular culture ==
Both Tria Hania and Neochorouda are mentioned in Penelope Delta’s book “The Secrets of the Swamp” (1937).

== Notable people ==
Various people have been born in the village, especially people involved in the Greek liberation movement.

- Christos Papantoniou (1890-1995) veteran of the Balkan Wars and the Macedonian Struggle.
- Apostolos Toumbas, the founder of Neodent dental equipment company, which has exports abroad, was born in the village in 1949.
