= Mesimeri, Thessaloniki =

Mesimeri Μεσημέρι
- Community
- Location within Greece
- Coordinates: 40°24.8′N 23°0.5′E
- Country: Greece
- Administrative region: Central Macedonia
- Regional unit: Thessaloniki
- Municipality: Thermaikos
- Municipal unit: Epanomi

Area
  - Community: 12.825 km^{2} (4.952 sq mi)
- Elevation: 100 m (330 ft)

Population (2021)
  - Community: 1,533
  - Density: 119.5/km^{2} (309.6/sq mi)
- Time zone: UTC+2 (EET)
  - Summer (DST): UTC+3 (EEST)
- Postal code: 575 00
- Area code: +30-2392
- Vehicle registration: NA to NX

Mesimeri (Greek: Μεσημέρι) is a village and a community of the Thermaikos municipality. Before the 2011 local government reform it was part of the municipality of Epanomi, of which it was a municipal district. The 2021 census recorded 1,533 inhabitants in the village. The community of Mesimeri covers an area of 12.825 km^{2}.

== See also ==
- List of settlements in the Thessaloniki regional unit
