= Peristera, Thessaloniki =

Peristera Περιστερά
- Community
- Location within Greece
- Coordinates: 40°32.9′N 23°9.9′E
- Country: Greece
- Administrative region: Central Macedonia
- Regional unit: Thessaloniki
- Municipality: Thermi
- Municipal unit: Vasilika

Area
  - Community: 40.208 km^{2} (15.524 sq mi)
- Elevation: 570 m (1,870 ft)

Population (2021)
  - Community: 651
  - Density: 16.2/km^{2} (41.9/sq mi)
- Time zone: UTC+2 (EET)
  - Summer (DST): UTC+3 (EEST)
- Postal code: 570 06
- Area code: +30-2396
- Vehicle registration: NA to NX

Peristera (Greek: Περιστερά) is a village and a community of the Thermi municipality. Before the 2011 local government reform it was part of the municipality of Vasilika, of which it was a municipal district. The 2021 census recorded 651 inhabitants in the village. The community of Peristera covers an area of 40.208 km^{2}.

== See also ==
- List of settlements in the Thessaloniki regional unit
