= Prochoma =

Prochoma Πρόχωμα
- Community
- Location within Greece
- Coordinates: 40°47.9′N 22°40′E
- Country: Greece
- Administrative region: Central Macedonia
- Regional unit: Thessaloniki
- Municipality: Chalkidona
- Municipal unit: Koufalia

Area
  - Community: 38.537 km^{2} (14.879 sq mi)
- Elevation: 65 m (213 ft)

Population (2021)
  - Community: 1,940
  - Density: 50.3/km^{2} (130/sq mi)
- Time zone: UTC+2 (EET)
  - Summer (DST): UTC+3 (EEST)
- Postal code: 570 11
- Area code: +30-231
- Vehicle registration: NA to NX

Prochoma (Greek: Πρόχωμα, ['pɾoxoma]) is a village and a community of the Chalkidona municipality. Before the 2011 local government reform it was part of the municipality of Koufalia, of which it was a municipal district. The 2021 census recorded 1,940 inhabitants in the community. The community of Prochoma covers an area of 38.537 km^{2}.

== Administrative division ==
The community of Prochoma consists of three communities:

- Akropotamos (population 453 in 2021)
- Kastanas (population 483)
- Prochoma (population 1,004)

== History ==
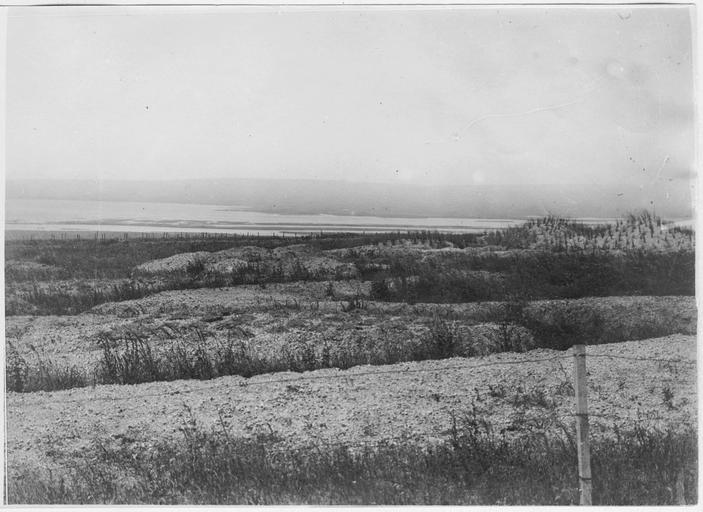
Surroundings of Dogantzi in 1916. In the background, the Axios.

The population of Prochoma consists of Greek refugees from Pontus. The village was named Dogantzi until 1926.

== See also ==
- List of settlements in the Thessaloniki regional unit
