= Livadi, Thessaloniki =

Livadi Λιβάδι
- Community
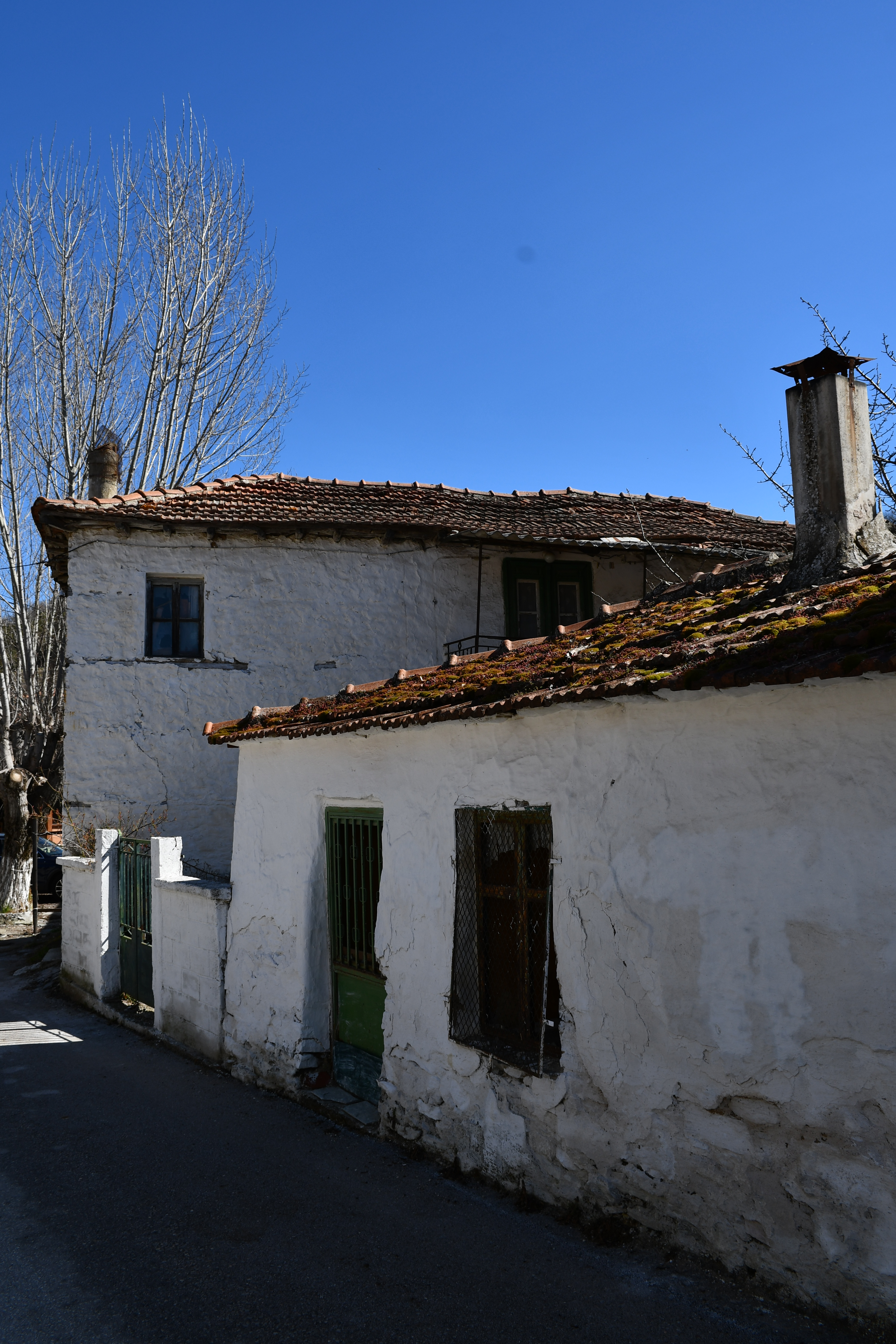
- Traditional houses in Livadi

- Location within Greece
- Coordinates: 40°31′23″N 23°13′16″E
- Country: Greece
- Administrative region: Central Macedonia
- Regional unit: Thessaloniki
- Municipality: Thermi
- Municipal unit: Vasilika

Population (2021)
  - Community: 351
- Time zone: UTC+2 (EET)
  - Summer (DST): UTC+3 (EEST)

Livadi (Greek: Λιβάδι) is a village in Vasilika, Thermi, Thessaloniki, Greece. It is located at an average elevation of 716 meters above the sea level.
