= Nea Raidestos =

Nea Raidestos Νέα Ραιδεστός
- Community
- Location within Greece
- Coordinates: 40°31.5′N 23°3.2′E
- Country: Greece
- Administrative region: Central Macedonia
- Regional unit: Thessaloniki
- Municipality: Thermi
- Municipal unit: Thermi

Area
  - Community: 14.65 km^{2} (5.66 sq mi)
- Elevation: 45 m (148 ft)

Population (2021)
  - Community: 4,061
  - Density: 277.2/km^{2} (717.9/sq mi)
- Time zone: UTC+2 (EET)
  - Summer (DST): UTC+3 (EEST)
- Postal code: 570 00
- Area code: +30-231
- Vehicle registration: NA to NX

Nea Raidestos (Greek: Νέα Ραιδεστός) is a village and a community of the Thermi municipality. The village was settled by Greek refugees from Raidestos (today's Tekirdağ, Turkey) after the 1923 Population Exchange. Before the 2011 local government reform it was part of the municipality of Thermi, of which it was a municipal district. The 2021 census recorded 4,061 inhabitants in the community. The community of Nea Raidestos covers an area of 14.65 km^{2}.

== Administrative division ==
The community of Nea Raidestos consists of two separate settlements (2021 populations):

- Filothei (population 389)
- Nea Raidestos (population 3,672)

== See also ==
- List of settlements in the Thessaloniki regional unit
