= Akropotamos, Thessaloniki =

Akropotamos Ακροπόταμος
- Settlement
- Location within Greece
- Coordinates: 40°50.4′N 22°39.2′E
- Country: Greece
- Administrative region: Central Macedonia
- Regional unit: Thessaloniki
- Municipality: Chalkidona
- Municipal unit: Koufalia
- Community: Prochoma
- Elevation: 40 m (130 ft)

Population (2021)
  - Total: 453
- Time zone: UTC+2 (EET)
  - Summer (DST): UTC+3 (EEST)
- Postal code: 570 11
- Area code: +30-231
- Vehicle registration: NA to NX

Akropotamos (Greek: Ακροπόταμος, [akɾo'potamos]) is a village of the Chalkidona municipality. The 2021 census recorded 453 inhabitants in the village. Akropotamos is a part of the community of Prochoma.

== History ==
The village's population primarily consists of Greek refugees from the Pontus region, who settled there following the Greco-Turkish War (1919–1922) and the subsequent population exchange between Greece and Turkey. This exchange was formalized by the Treaty of Lausanne in 1923, leading to significant demographic changes in various parts of Greece, including Akropotamos.

Prior to the 2011 local government reform, known as the Kallikratis Plan, Akropotamos was part of the municipality of Koufalia. Post-reform, it became part of the municipality of Chalkidona and is administratively included in the community of Prochoma.

== See also ==
- List of settlements in the Thessaloniki regional unit
