= Monopigado =

Monopigado Μονοπήγαδο
- Settlement
- Location within Greece
- Coordinates: 40°26.1′N 23°8.1′E
- Country: Greece
- Administrative region: Central Macedonia
- Regional unit: Thessaloniki
- Municipality: Thermi
- Municipal unit: Vasilika
- Community: Agios Antonios
- Elevation: 400 m (1,300 ft)

Population (2021)
  - Total: 180
- Time zone: UTC+2 (EET)
  - Summer (DST): UTC+3 (EEST)
- Postal code: 570 06
- Area code: +30-2396
- Vehicle registration: NA to NX

Monopigado (Greek: Μονοπήγαδο) is a village of the Thermi municipality. Before the 2011 local government reform it was part of the municipality of Vasilika. The 2021 census recorded 180 inhabitants in the village. Monopigado is a part of the community of Agios Antonios.

== See also ==
- List of settlements in the Thessaloniki regional unit
