= Filothei, Thessaloniki =

Filothei Φιλοθέη
- Settlement
- Location within Greece
- Coordinates: 40°31.6′N 23°4.4′E
- Country: Greece
- Administrative region: Central Macedonia
- Regional unit: Thessaloniki
- Municipality: Thermi
- Municipal unit: Thermi
- Community: Nea Raidestos
- Elevation: 120 m (390 ft)

Population (2021)
  - Total: 389
- Time zone: UTC+2 (EET)
  - Summer (DST): UTC+3 (EEST)
- Postal code: 570 01
- Area code: +30-231
- Vehicle registration: NA to NX

Filothei (Greek: Φιλοθέη) is a village of the Thermi municipality, northern Greece. The 2021 census recorded 389 inhabitants in the village. Filothei is a part of the community of Nea Raidestos.

== See also ==
- List of settlements in the Thessaloniki regional unit
