= Triadi =

Coordinates: 40.548°N 23.049°E

Triadi is a town near Thermi, Thessaloniki regional unit, northern Greece. It belongs in the Municipality of Thermi and it has a population of 2,131 people.

== See also ==
- List of settlements in the Thessaloniki regional unit

== Sources ==
- http://bbs.keyhole.com/ubb/showthreaded.php?Number=948554
