= Vasiloudi =

Village in Central Macedonia, Greece

Vasiloudi Βασιλούδι
- Community
- Location within Greece
- Coordinates: 40°38′N 23°11.35′E
- Country: Greece
- Administrative region: Central Macedonia
- Regional unit: Thessaloniki
- Municipality: Lagkadas
- Municipal unit: Koroneia

Area
  - Community: 23.021 km^{2} (8.888 sq mi)
- Elevation: 140 m (460 ft)

Population (2021)
  - Community: 606
  - Density: 26.3/km^{2} (68.2/sq mi)
- Time zone: UTC+2 (EET)
  - Summer (DST): UTC+3 (EEST)
- Postal code: 570 12
- Area code: +30-2393
- Vehicle registration: NA to NX

Vasiloudi (Greek: Βασιλούδι) is a village and a community in the Lagkadas municipality of Central Macedonia, Greece. Before the 2011 local government reform it was part of the municipality of Koroneia, of which it was a municipal district. The 2021 census recorded 606 inhabitants in the village. The community of Vasiloudi covers an area of 23.021 km^{2}.

== See also ==
- List of settlements in the Thessaloniki regional unit
