= Analipsi, Thessaloniki =

Analipsi Ανάληψη
- Community
- Location within Greece
- Coordinates: 40°43.25′N 23°10.4′E
- Country: Greece
- Administrative region: Central Macedonia
- Regional unit: Thessaloniki
- Municipality: Lagkadas
- Municipal unit: Lagkadas

Area
  - Community: 29.650 km^{2} (11.448 sq mi)
- Elevation: 115 m (377 ft)

Population (2021)
  - Community: 478
  - Density: 16.1/km^{2} (41.8/sq mi)
- Time zone: UTC+2 (EET)
  - Summer (DST): UTC+3 (EEST)
- Postal code: 572 00
- Area code: +30-2394
- Vehicle registration: NA to NX

Analipsi (Greek: Ανάληψη) is a village and a community of the Lagkadas municipality. Before the 2011 local government reform it was part of the municipality of Lagkadas, of which it was a municipal district. The 2021 census recorded 478 inhabitants in the village. The community of Analipsi covers an area of 29.650 km^{2}.

== See also ==
- List of settlements in the Thessaloniki regional unit
