= Chrysavgi, Thessaloniki =

Chrysavgi Χρυσαυγή
- Community
- Location within Greece
- Coordinates: 40°45.9′N 23°4.85′E
- Country: Greece
- Administrative region: Central Macedonia
- Regional unit: Thessaloniki
- Municipality: Langadas
- Municipal unit: Langadas

Area
  - Community: 16.024 km^{2} (6.187 sq mi)
- Elevation: 120 m (390 ft)

Population (2021)
  - Community: 1,017
  - Density: 63.47/km^{2} (164.4/sq mi)
- Time zone: UTC+2 (EET)
  - Summer (DST): UTC+3 (EEST)
- Postal code: 572 00
- Area code: +30-2394
- Vehicle registration: NA to NX

Chrysavgi (Greek: Χρυσαυγή) is a village and a community of the Langadas municipality. Before the 2011 local government reform it was part of the municipality of Langadas, of which it was a municipal district. The 2021 census recorded 1,017 inhabitants in the village. The community of Chrysavgi covers an area of 16.024 km^{2}.

== See also ==
- List of settlements in the Thessaloniki regional unit
