= Epanomi =

Epanomi Επανομή
- Municipal unit
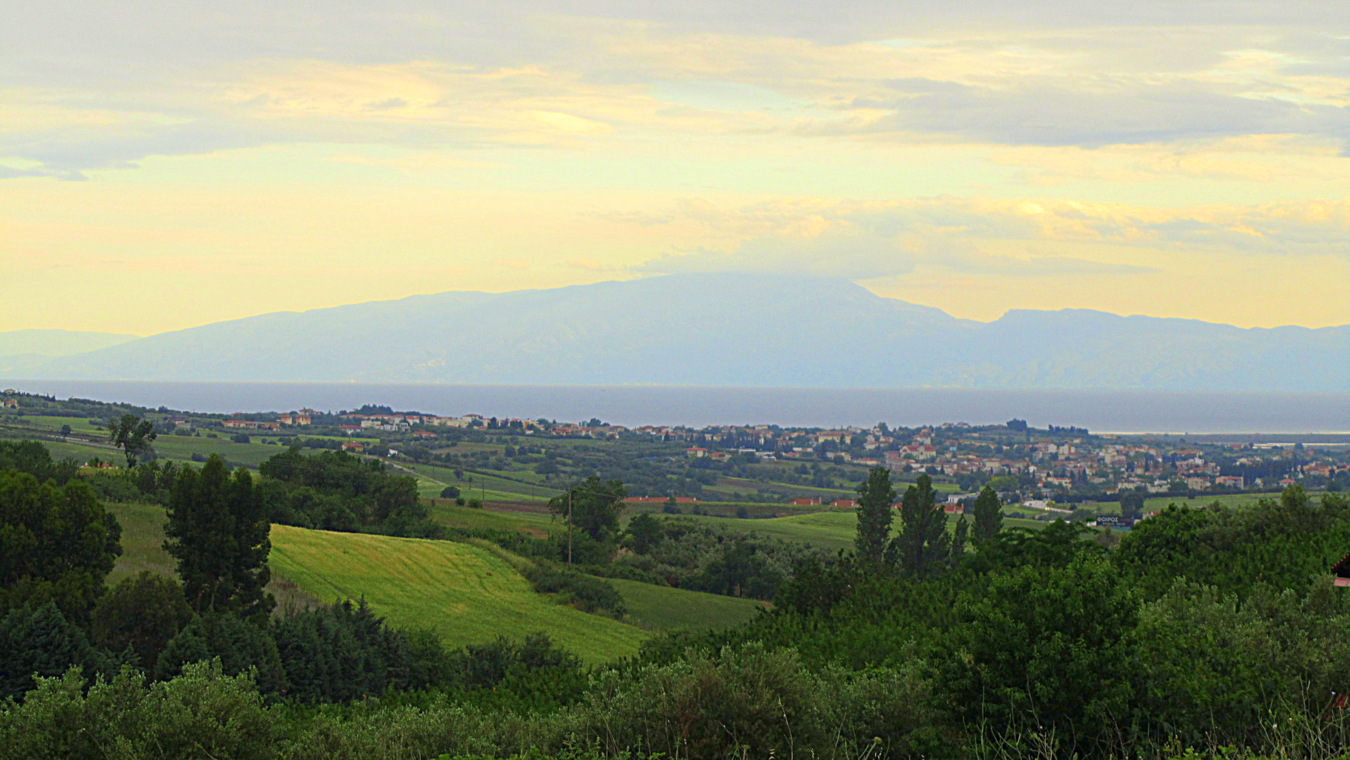

- Location within the regional unit

- Location within Greece
- Coordinates: 40°26′N 22°56′E
- Country: Greece
- Administrative region: Central Macedonia
- Regional unit: Thessaloniki
- Municipality: Thermaikos

Area
  - Municipal unit: 91.541 km^{2} (35.344 sq mi)
  - Community: 78.716 km^{2} (30.392 sq mi)
- Elevation: 50 m (160 ft)

Population (2021)
  - Municipal unit: 9,910
  - Municipal unit density: 108/km^{2} (280/sq mi)
  - Community: 8,377
  - Community density: 106.4/km^{2} (275.6/sq mi)
- Time zone: UTC+2 (EET)
  - Summer (DST): UTC+3 (EEST)

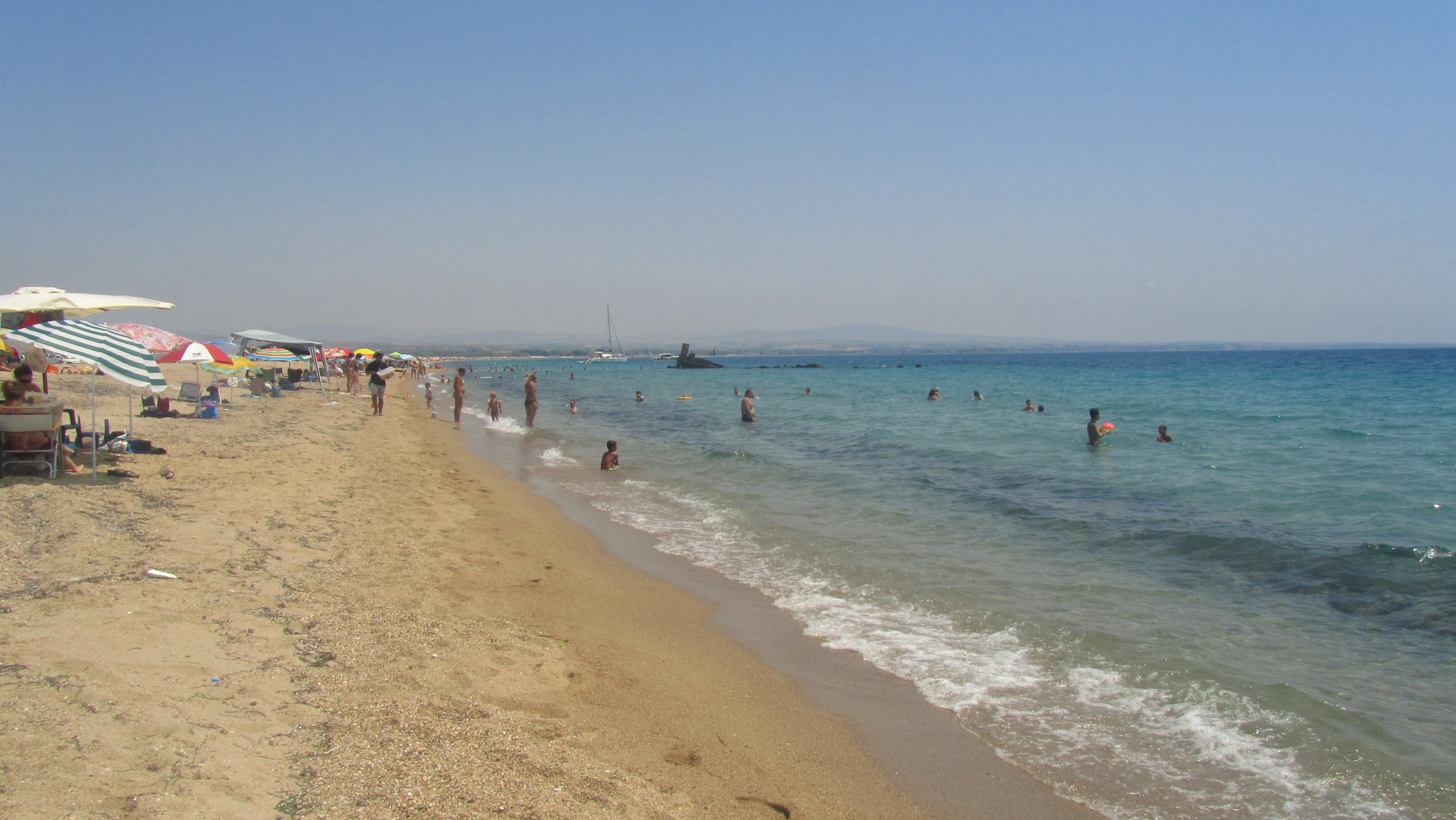
A beach

Epanomi (Greek: Επανομή) is a town and a former municipality in the Thessaloniki regional unit, Greece. Since the 2011 local government reform it is part of the municipality of Thermaikos, of which it is a municipal unit. It is located 25 km (16 mi) away from the city center of Thessaloniki. The municipal unit includes the village of Mesimeri, with a combined population of 9,910 (2021). The municipal unit Epanomi has an area of 91.541 km^{2} (35.344 sq mi), and the community Epanomi has an area of 78.716 km^{2} (30.392 sq mi).

Epanomi has a long, historic path as it is the second oldest establishment in Macedonia (Greece) after Angelochori (as archaeologist Theocharis Pazaras indicated with his work) since the area of Epanomi has been inhabited since the Neolithic period. According to the statistics of Vasil Kanchov ("Macedonia, Ethnography and Statistics"), 2.300 Greek Christians lived in the village in 1900. The town circulates its economy on tourism and farming, as it is well known among Greeks for its coasts and organized beautiful beaches (awarded annually the blue flag) easily approached from Thessaloniki. It is also known and visited for its tradition in good wine and tsipouro (a strong distilled alcoholic beverage made by fermentation of grape pomace).

The local football team Anagennisi Epanomi F.C. has recently played in the third division in Greece.

Stavros Sarafis footballer of PAOK and the National Team of Greece was from Epanomi.

== Transport ==
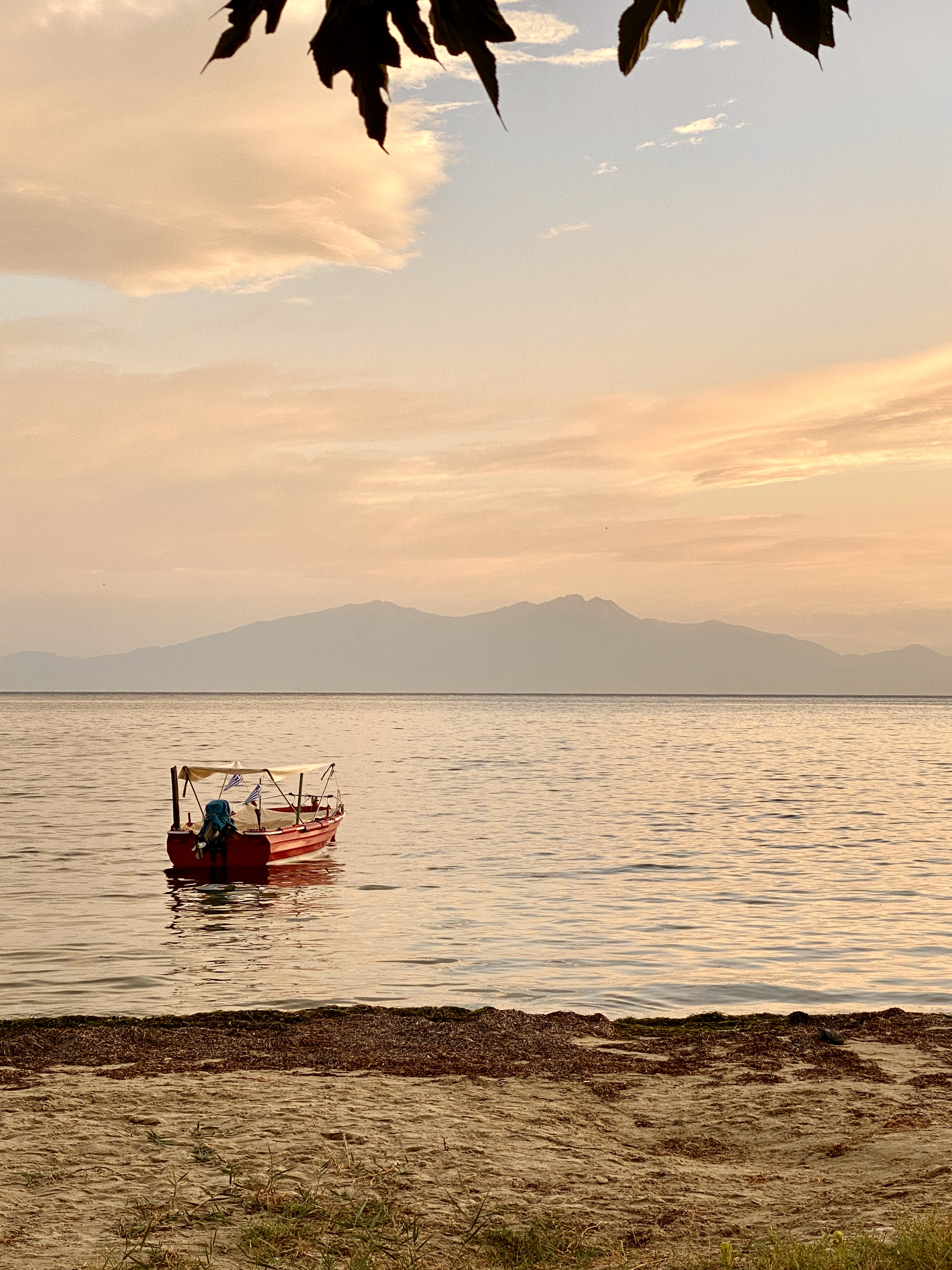
View of Mount Olympus from a beach near the port of Epanomi in July 2023.

Epanomi is connected to IKEA on the east side of Thessaloniki through line 69 of the Thessaloniki Urban Transport Organization (OASTH) and its sub-lines. From IKEA there are the lines 2K and 3K that connect the area with the center of Thessaloniki. In addition, line 77 connects Epanomi with Nea Michaniona which also belongs to the municipality of Thermaikos. An exception is the summer line 77H that connects the center of Epanomi with Potamos beach with itineraries from morning until late afternoon.

In summer, the express line 70 that connects Epanomi - through the center of Thessaloniki - with the New Railway Station on the west side of the co-capital also operates. The journey takes one hour with minimal stops at the most important points.
