= Agios Antonios, Thessaloniki =

Agios Antonios Άγιος Αντώνιος
- Community
- Location within Greece
- Coordinates: 40°26.2′N 23°5.6′E
- Country: Greece
- Administrative region: Central Macedonia
- Regional unit: Thessaloniki
- Municipality: Thermi
- Municipal unit: Vasilika

Area
  - Community: 50.023 km^{2} (19.314 sq mi)
- Elevation: 302 m (991 ft)

Population (2021)
  - Community: 726
  - Density: 14.5/km^{2} (37.6/sq mi)
- Time zone: UTC+2 (EET)
  - Summer (DST): UTC+3 (EEST)
- Postal code: 570 06
- Area code: +30-2396
- Vehicle registration: NA to NX

Agios Antonios (Greek: Άγιος Αντώνιος) is a village and a community of the Thermi municipality. Before the 2011 local government reform it was part of the municipality of Vasilika, of which it was a municipal district. The 2021 census recorded 726 inhabitants in the community. The community of Agios Antonios covers an area of 50.023 km^{2}.

== Administrative division ==
The community of Agios Antonios consists of two separate settlements (2021 populations):

- Agios Antonios (population 546)
- Monopigado (population 180)

== See also ==
- List of settlements in the Thessaloniki regional unit
