= Michaniona =

Michaniona Μηχανιώνα
- Municipal unit
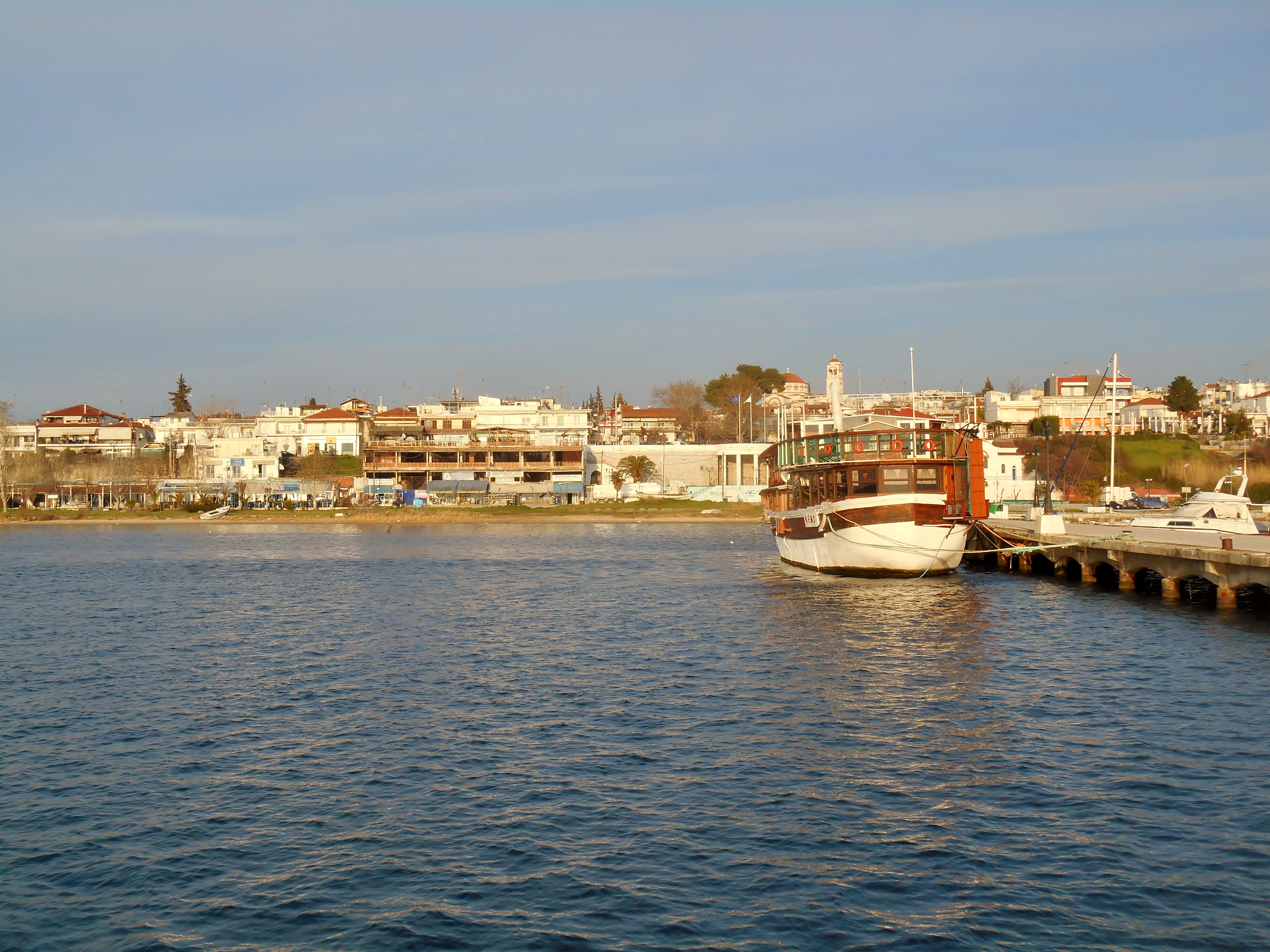

- Location within the regional unit

- Location within Greece
- Coordinates: 40°28′N 22°52′E
- Country: Greece
- Administrative region: Central Macedonia
- Regional unit: Thessaloniki
- Municipality: Thermaikos

Area
  - Municipal unit: 21.569 km^{2} (8.328 sq mi)

Population (2021)
  - Municipal unit: 10,784
  - Municipal unit density: 499.98/km^{2} (1,294.9/sq mi)
- Time zone: UTC+2 (EET)
  - Summer (DST): UTC+3 (EEST)

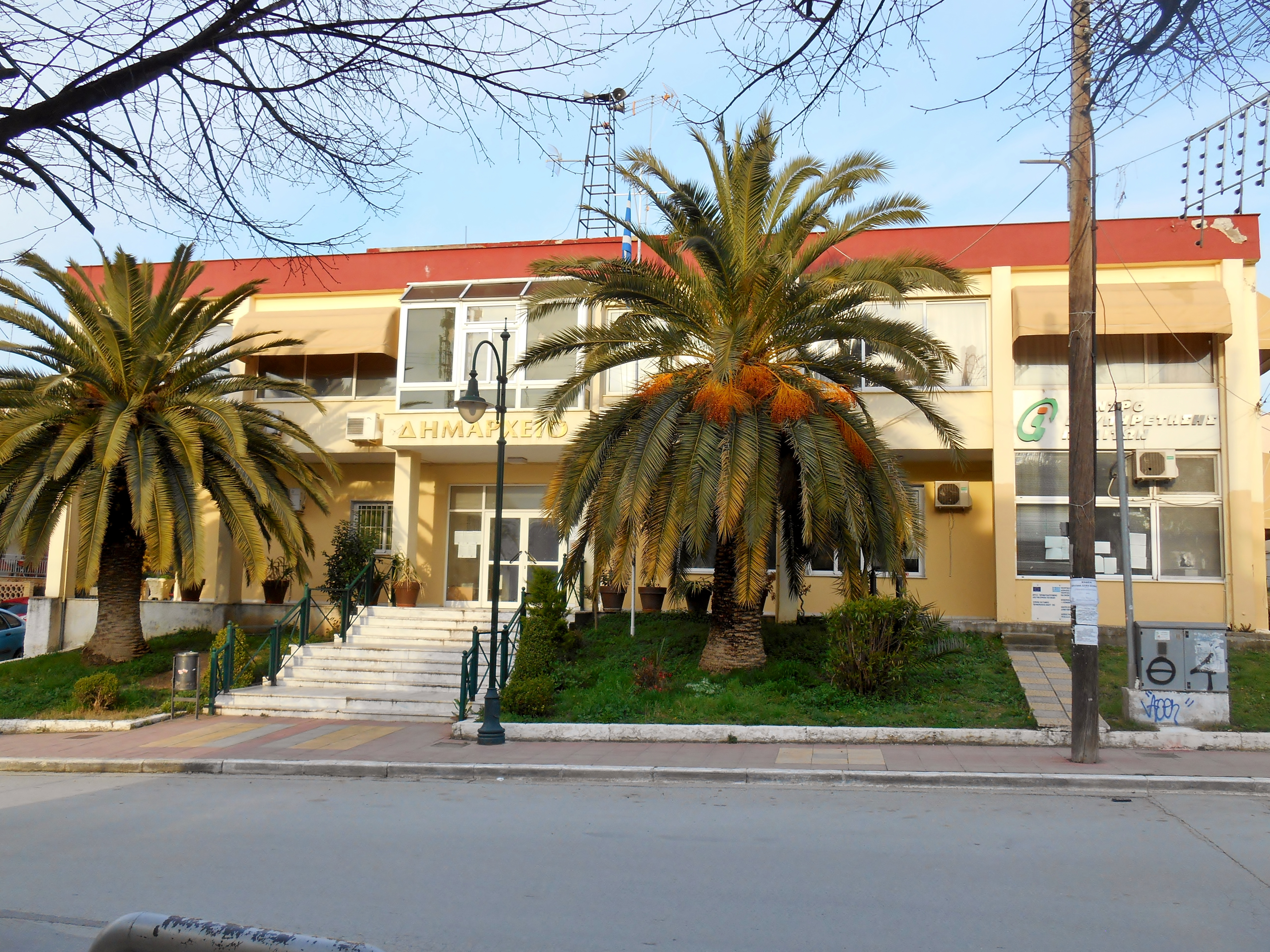
Town hall

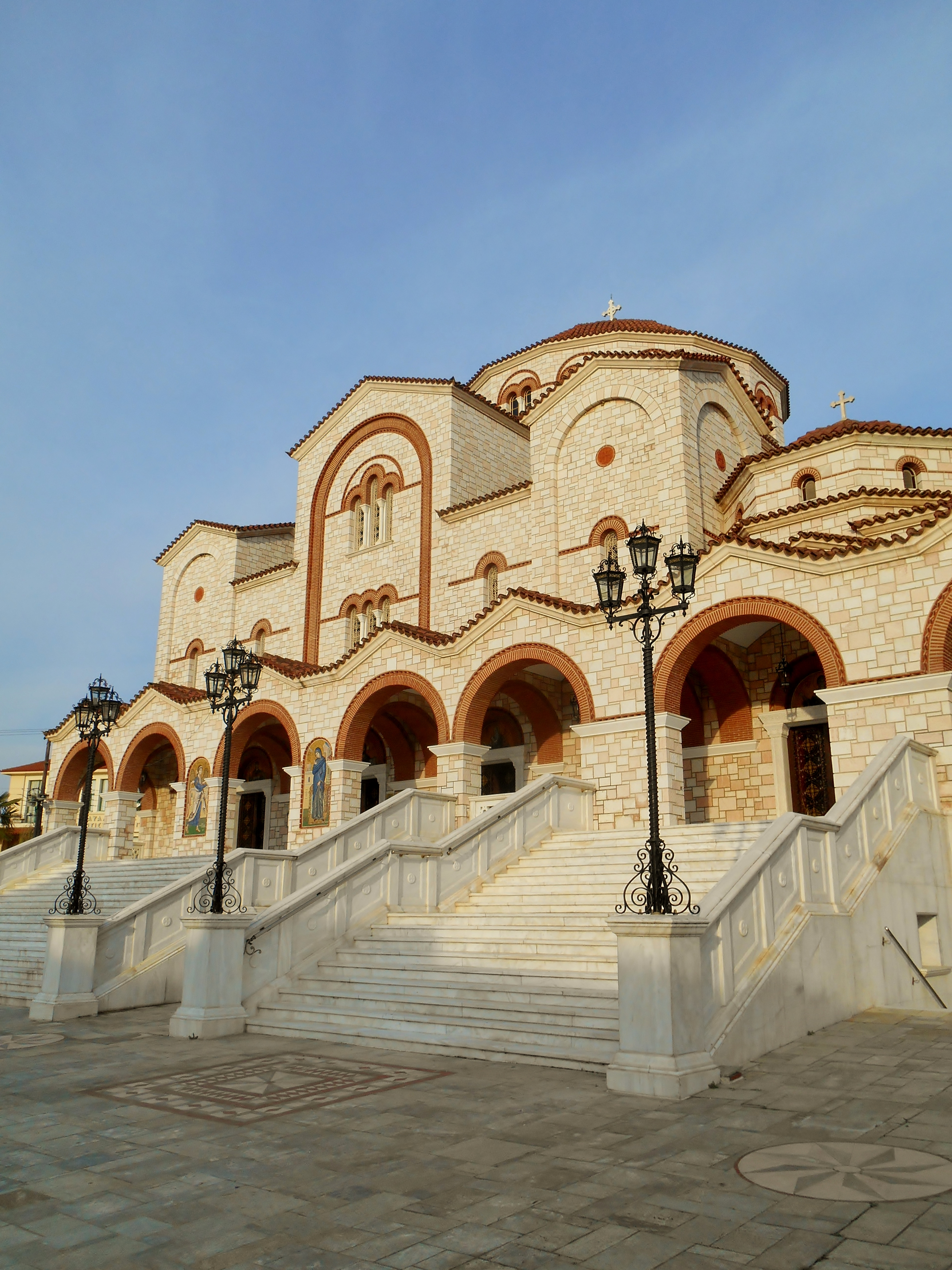
A church

Michaniona (Greek: Μηχανιώνα) was a former municipality in the Thessaloniki regional unit, Greece. Since the 2011 local government reform, the town/suburb is part of the municipality of Thermaikos, of which it is a municipal unit. Population 10,784 (2021). The municipal unit has an area of 21.569 km^{2}. The seat of the municipality was in Nea Michaniona. The other communities in the municipal unit are Angelochori and Nea Kerasia. Michaniona is located near the site of the ancient city of Aenea.

The town was settled by Greek refugees from the original Michaniona on the Cyzicus peninsula in the Sea of Marmara.
