= Pylaia-Chortiatis =

Pylaia-Chortiatis Πυλαία-Χορτιάτης
- Municipality
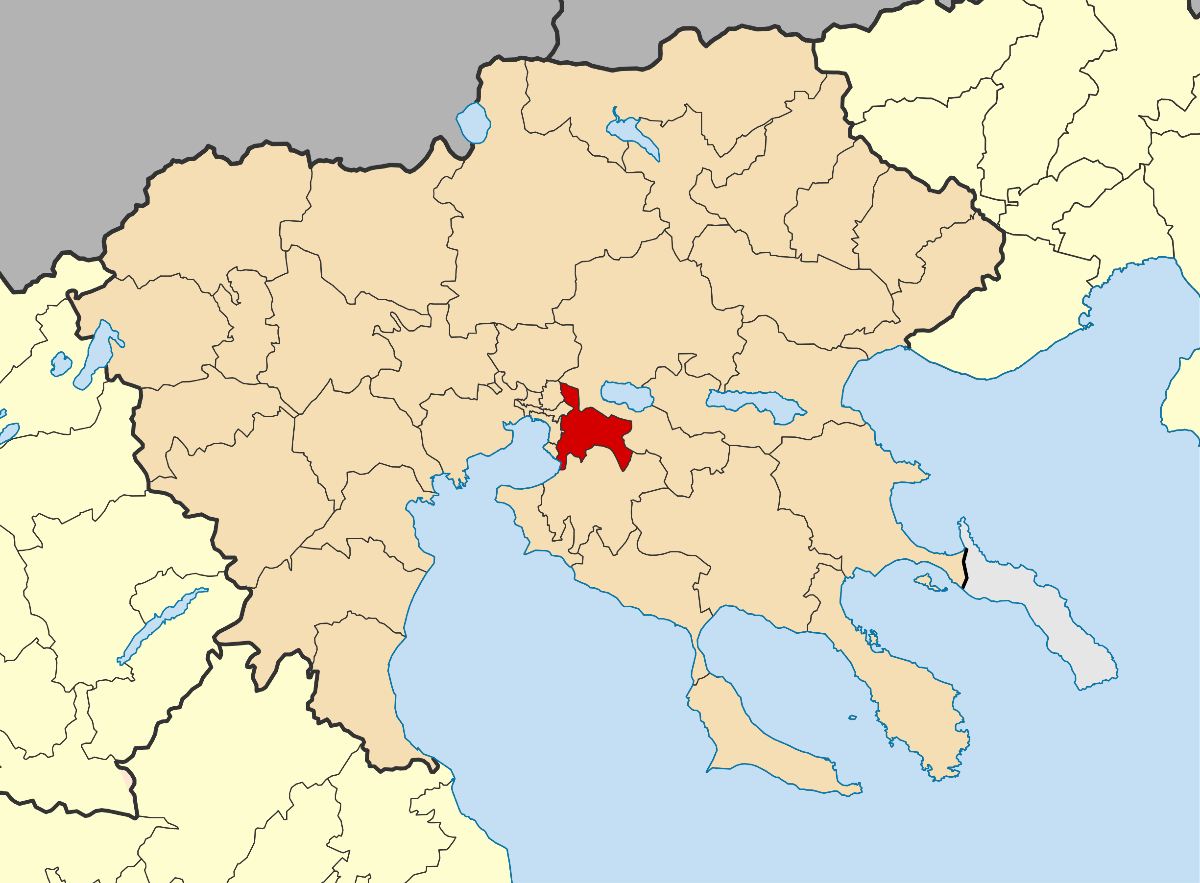

- Location within Greece
- Coordinates: 40°35′N 23°02′E
- Country: Greece
- Administrative region: Central Macedonia
- Regional unit: Thessaloniki
- Seat: Panorama

Area
  - Municipality: 155.63 km^{2} (60.09 sq mi)

Population (2021)
  - Municipality: 72,384
  - Density: 465.10/km^{2} (1,204.6/sq mi)
- Time zone: UTC+2 (EET)
  - Summer (DST): UTC+3 (EEST)
- Website: Official website

Pylaia-Chortiatis (Greek: Πυλαία-Χορτιάτης) is a municipality in the Thessaloniki regional unit, Central Macedonia, Greece, consisting of three suburbs of Thessaloniki. The seat of the municipality is Panorama. The municipality has an area of 155.63 km^{2}.

== Municipality ==
The municipality Pylaia-Chortiatis was formed at the 2011 local government reform by the merger of the following 3 former municipalities, that became municipal units:

- Chortiatis
- Panorama
- Pylaia
