= Lagyna =

Village in Central Macedonia, Greece

Lagyna Λαγυνά
- Community
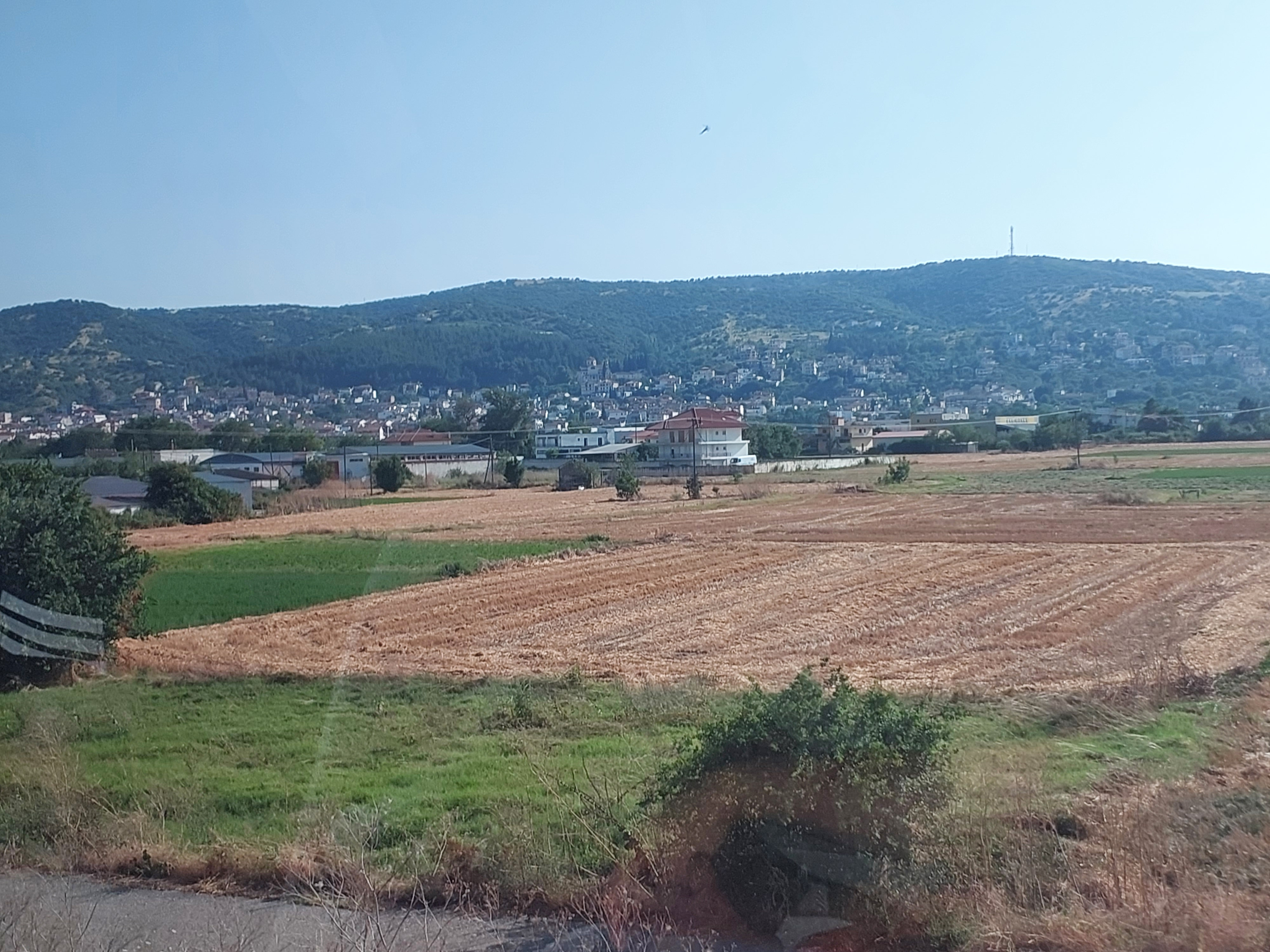
- View of Lagyna

- Location within Greece
- Coordinates: 40°43.43′N 23°0.3′E
- Country: Greece
- Administrative region: Central Macedonia
- Regional unit: Thessaloniki
- Municipality: Lagkadas
- Municipal unit: Lagkadas

Area
  - Community: 13.435 km^{2} (5.187 sq mi)
- Elevation: 125 m (410 ft)

Population (2021)
  - Community: 3,552
  - Density: 264.4/km^{2} (684.8/sq mi)
- Time zone: UTC+2 (EET)
  - Summer (DST): UTC+3 (EEST)
- Postal code: 572 00
- Area code: +30-2394
- Vehicle registration: NA to NX

Lagyna (Greek: Λαγυνά) is a village and a community of the Lagkadas municipality, in Central Macedonia, Greece. Before the 2011 local government reform it used to be a municipal district. The 2021 census recorded 3,552 inhabitants in the village, with the community covering an area of 13.435 km^{2}.

According to the statistics of Vasil Kanchov ("Macedonia, Ethnography and Statistics"), 700 Greek Christians lived in the village in 1900.

== See also ==
- List of settlements in the Thessaloniki regional unit
