= Krithia, Thessaloniki =

Krithia Κριθιά
- Community
- Location within Greece
- Coordinates: 40°50.45′N 22°59′E
- Country: Greece
- Administrative region: Central Macedonia
- Regional unit: Thessaloniki
- Municipality: Lagkadas
- Municipal unit: Assiros

Area
  - Community: 21.288 km^{2} (8.219 sq mi)
- Elevation: 220 m (720 ft)

Population (2021)
  - Community: 1,253
  - Density: 58.86/km^{2} (152.4/sq mi)
- Time zone: UTC+2 (EET)
  - Summer (DST): UTC+3 (EEST)
- Postal code: 57200
- Area code: +30-2393
- Vehicle registration: NA to NX

Krithia (Greek: Κριθιά) is a village and a community of the Lagkadas municipality. Before the 2011 local government reform it was part of the municipality of Assiros, of which it was a municipal district. The 2021 census recorded 1,253 inhabitants in the village. The community of Krithia covers an area of 21.288 km^{2}.

== See also ==
- List of settlements in the Thessaloniki regional unit
