= Charilaou =

District in Thessaloniki, Greece

Coordinates: 40°36′N 22°58′E

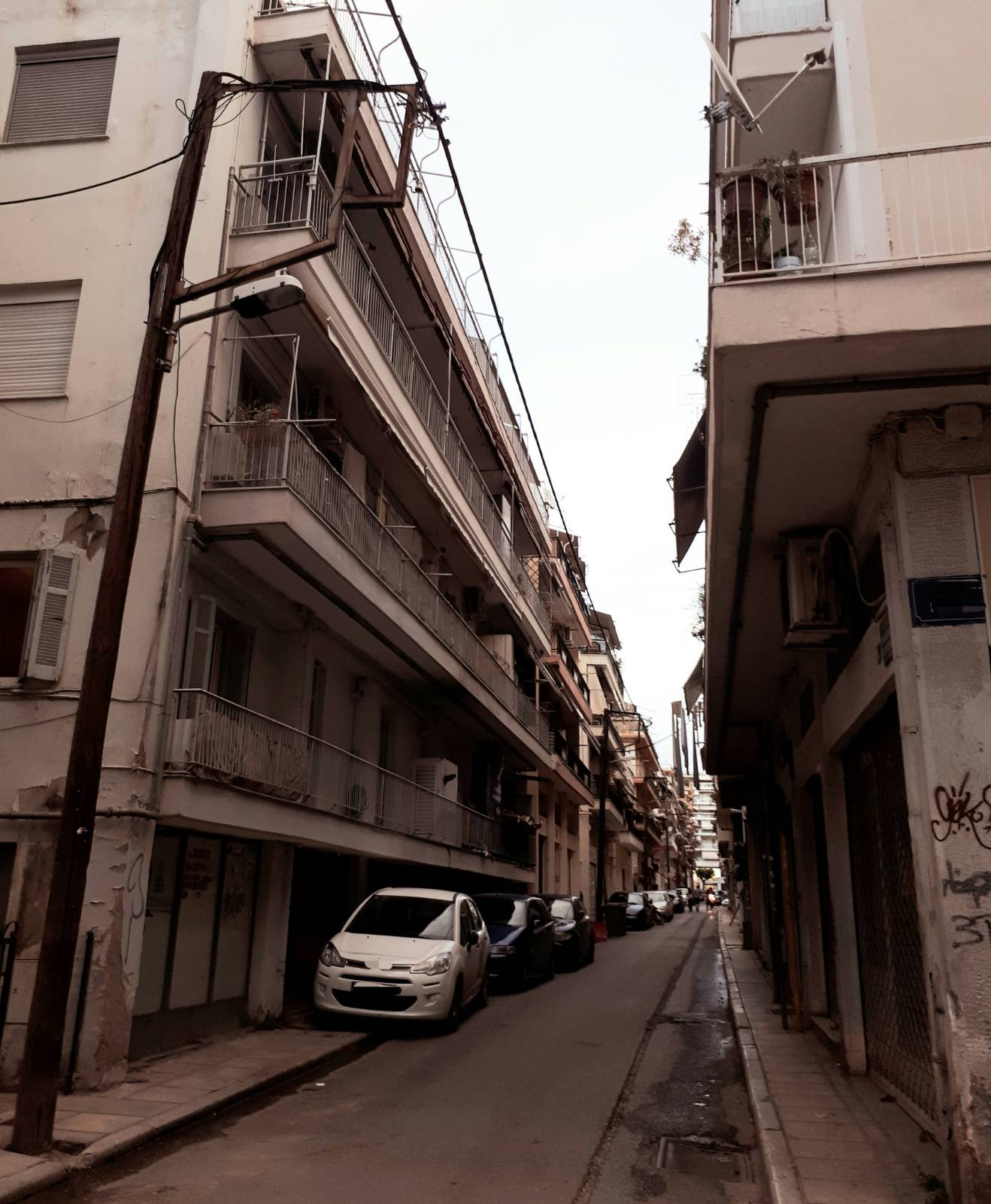
Charilaou, a densely built-up district

Charilaou (Greek: Χαριλάου) is a district in eastern Thessaloniki, Greece.

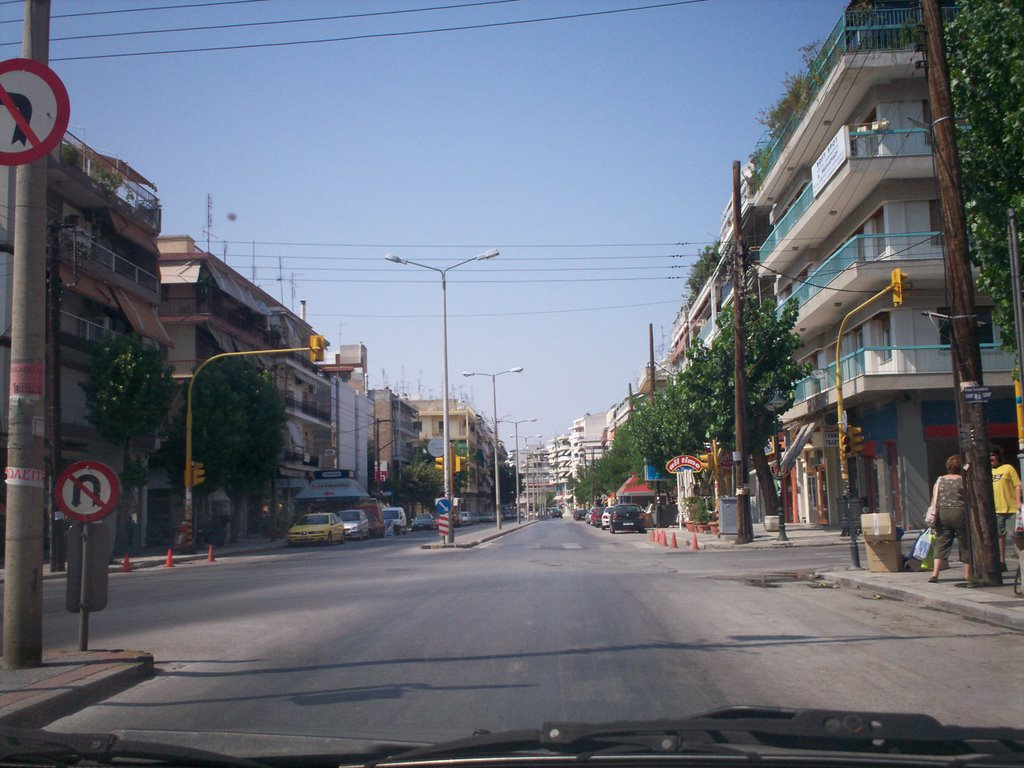
Papanastasiou Street

The district was named after the banker and entrepreneur Epameinontas Charilaos, the landowner in the area, who had origins from the Ainos of Thrace. There is also the Ainou square named after this town.

It is densely built-up and located above the Dépôt area and near Toumba and Pylaia. Its main street is Papanastasiou Street where is also located Kleanthis Vikelidis Stadium.

== Sport Clubs ==
Notable sport clubs based in Charilaou
Club	Founded	Sports	Achievements
Aris Thessaloniki	1914	Multi sports	Panhellenic titles in football, basketball, volleyball, waterpolo. Three European Cups in basketball

== Sources ==
- Γειτονιές της πόλης: Χαριλάου
