= Mediterranean Cosmos =

Shopping mall in Pylaia, Thessaloniki, Greece

Coordinates: 40.5558°N 22.9936°E

- Front view of the mall.
- Address: 11km National Road Thessaloniki - N. Moudania, 57001, Thessaloniki, Greece
- Opened: October 2005
- Developer: Lamda Development S.A.
- Owner: Lamda Development
- Num. of stores: 226
- Num. of anchor tenants: 7
- Floor area: 60,000 square metres (650,000 sq ft)
- Floors: 2
- Parking: 3000
- Public transit: OASTH 36 45 KOSMOS
- Website: www.mediterraneancosmos.gr/en

Mediterranean Cosmos is a shopping mall located in Pylaia, a municipality of Thessaloniki, the second-largest city in Greece. It is the largest retail and entertainment development in Northern Greece.

== History ==
The mall officially opened in October 2005.

In June 2012, Lamda Development, the owners of the mall, announced that they will begin to charge parking fees from mid-February 2013.

In 2017, Värde Partners bought a controlling stake of the Mediterranean Cosmos and planned out an extension of the mall.

== Facilities ==
It contains more than 200 retail units and facilities including an 11-screen multiplex cinema, numerous shops of fashion and electronics goods as well as cafés, restaurants, bars, a supermarket, an amphitheatre and an Orthodox church.

== Design ==
Inside the mall, roads and square have been designed-like traditional cities of Northern Greece in combination with the advantages of a modern city's center.

== Location ==
The mall is located 11 kilometres (6.8 mi) east of the city-centre and approximately 5 kilometres (3.1 mi) away from Thessaloniki Airport. It can be accessed by National Road 67, the highway connecting Thessaloniki with the southern part of Chalkidiki.
