= Angelochori =

Village in Central Macedonia, Greece

Angelochori Αγγελοχώρι
- Community
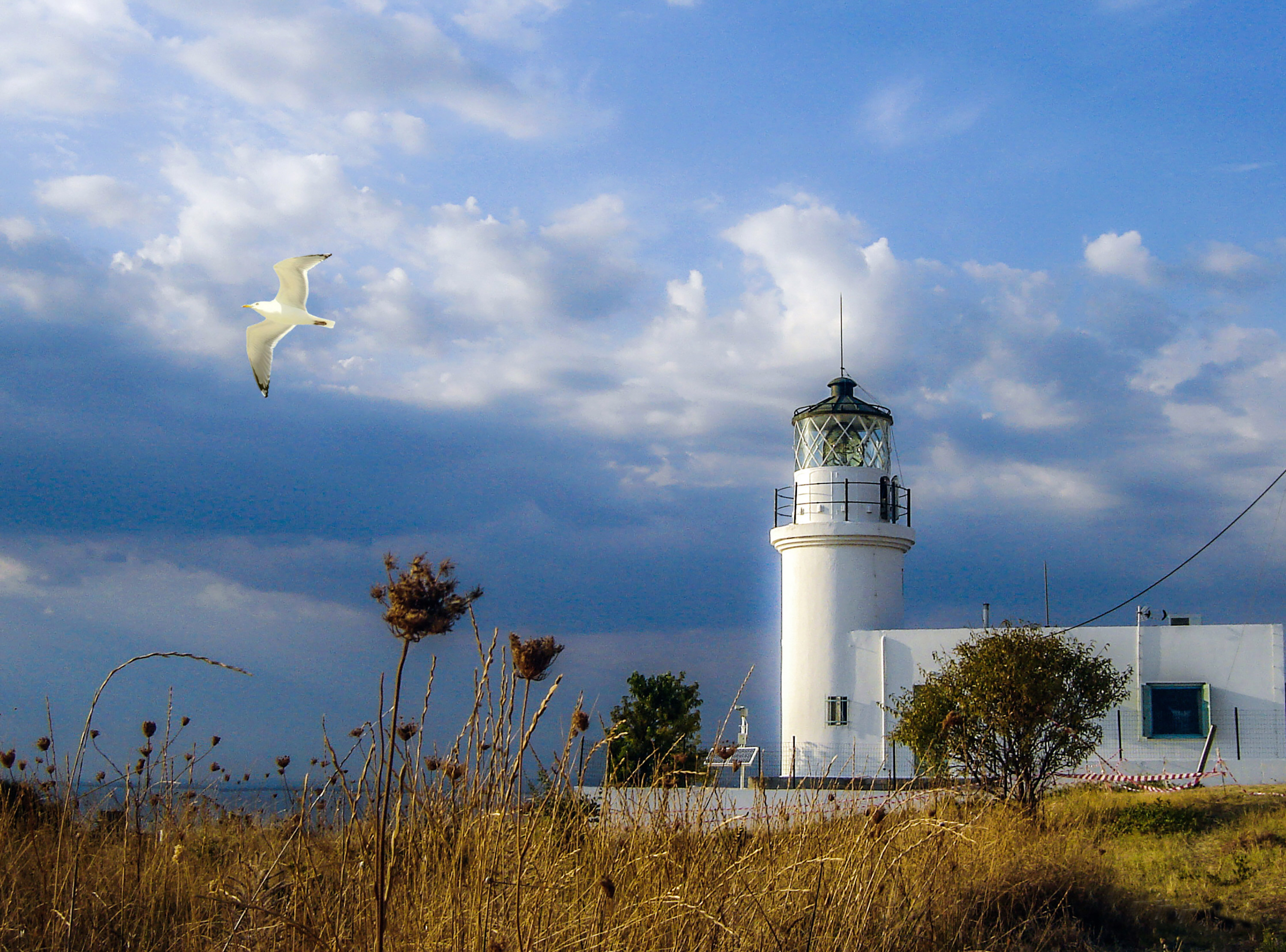
- The wetland, the flora and fauna of the area

- Location within Greece
- Coordinates: 40°29′49″N 22°50′02″E
- Country: Greece
- Administrative region: Central Macedonia
- Regional unit: Thessaloniki
- Municipality: Thermaikos
- Municipal unit: Michaniona

Population (2021)
  - Community: 1,074
- Time zone: UTC+2 (EET)
  - Summer (DST): UTC+3 (EEST)

Angelochori (Greek: Αγγελοχώρι) is a village in the municipal unit of Thermaikos, in the Thessaloniki regional unit, Greece. It is located to the east of Cape Megalo Embolo (Μεγάλο έμβολο), at an average elevation of 16 meters above the sea level.
