= Pylaia =

Pylaia Πυλαία
- Municipal unit
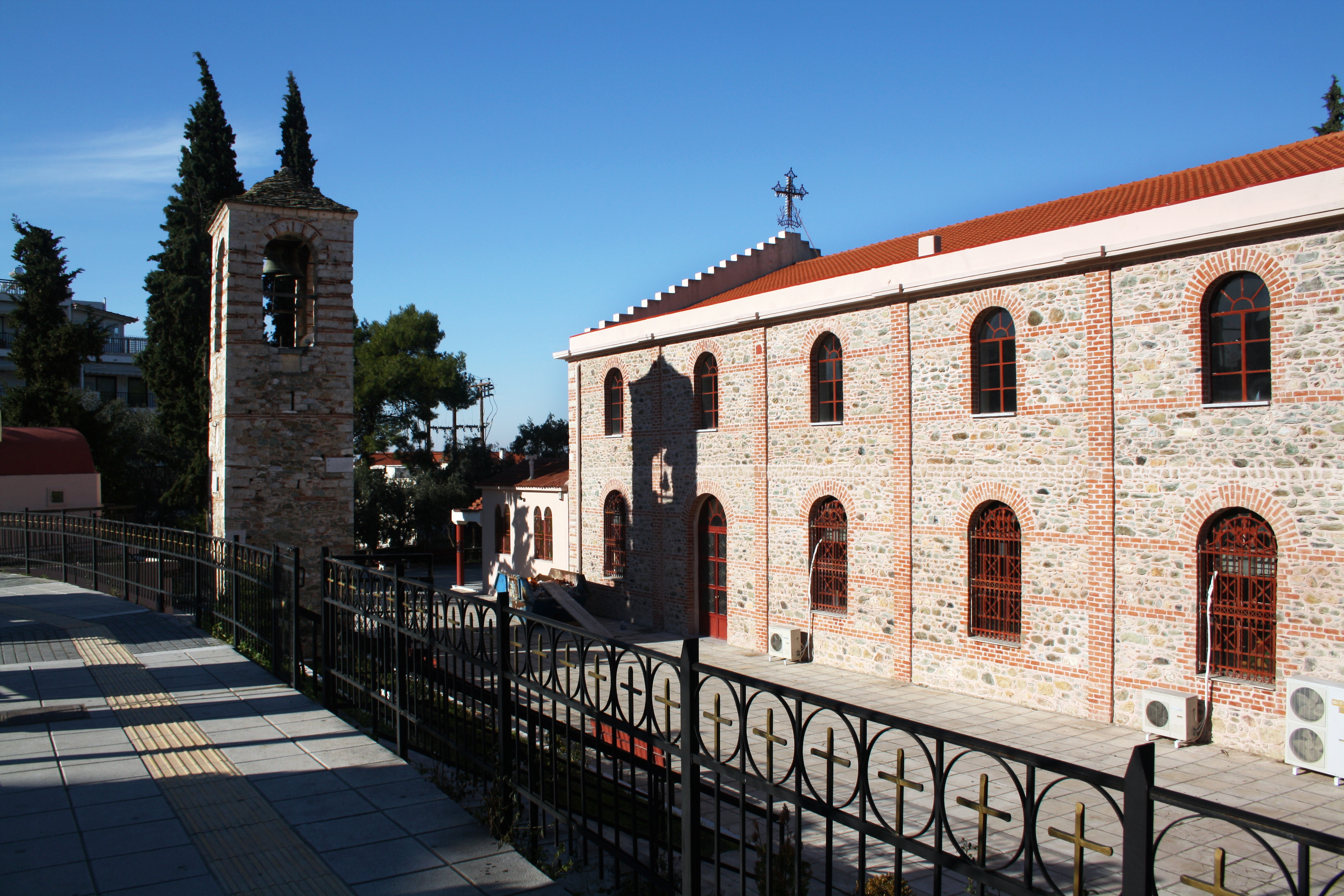
- St Elias of Pylaia

- Location within the regional unit

- Location within Greece
- Coordinates: 40°36′N 22°59′E
- Country: Greece
- Administrative region: Central Macedonia
- Regional unit: Thessaloniki
- Municipality: Pylaia-Chortiatis

Area
  - Municipal unit: 24.379 km^{2} (9.413 sq mi)

Population (2021)
  - Municipal unit: 36,843
  - Municipal unit density: 1,511.3/km^{2} (3,914.1/sq mi)
- Time zone: UTC+2 (EET)
  - Summer (DST): UTC+3 (EEST)

Pylaia (Greek: Πυλαία, romanized: Pylaía) is a former municipality in the Thessaloniki Prefecture of Greece. In the 2011 local government reform, Thessaloniki Prefecture became the regional unit of Thessaloniki (without boundary changes), and Pylaia became a part of the new municipality of Pylaia-Chortiatis. Pylaia continues under its old boundaries as a municipal unit within Pylaia-Chortiatis.

Pylaia covers 24.379 km^{2} with 4.5 km of coastline extending along the shores of the Thermaic Gulf and had a population of 36,843 at the 2021 census. Pylaia is relatively sparsely populated for a municipal unit within the Thessaloniki Urban Area.

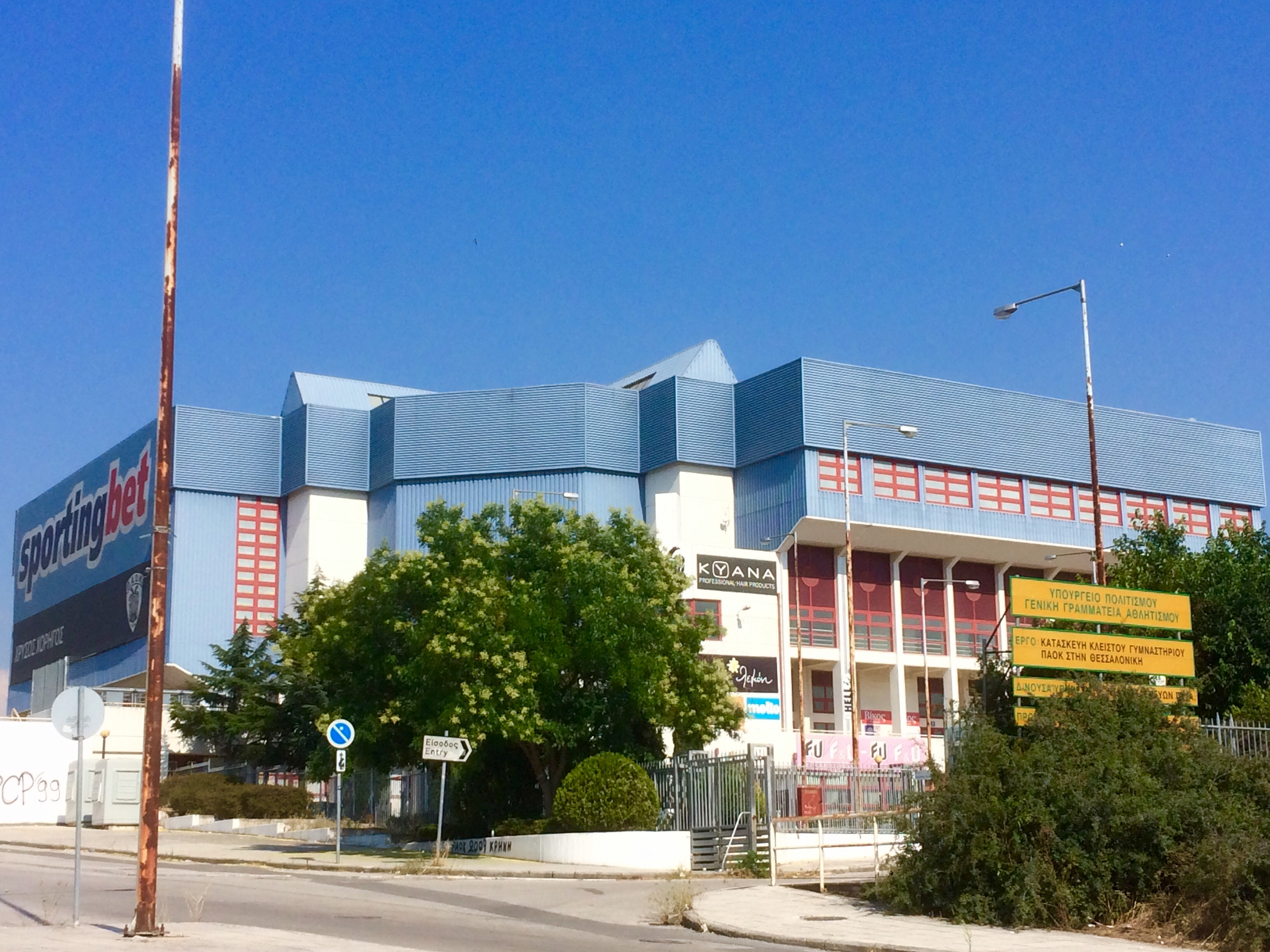
PAOK Sports Arena

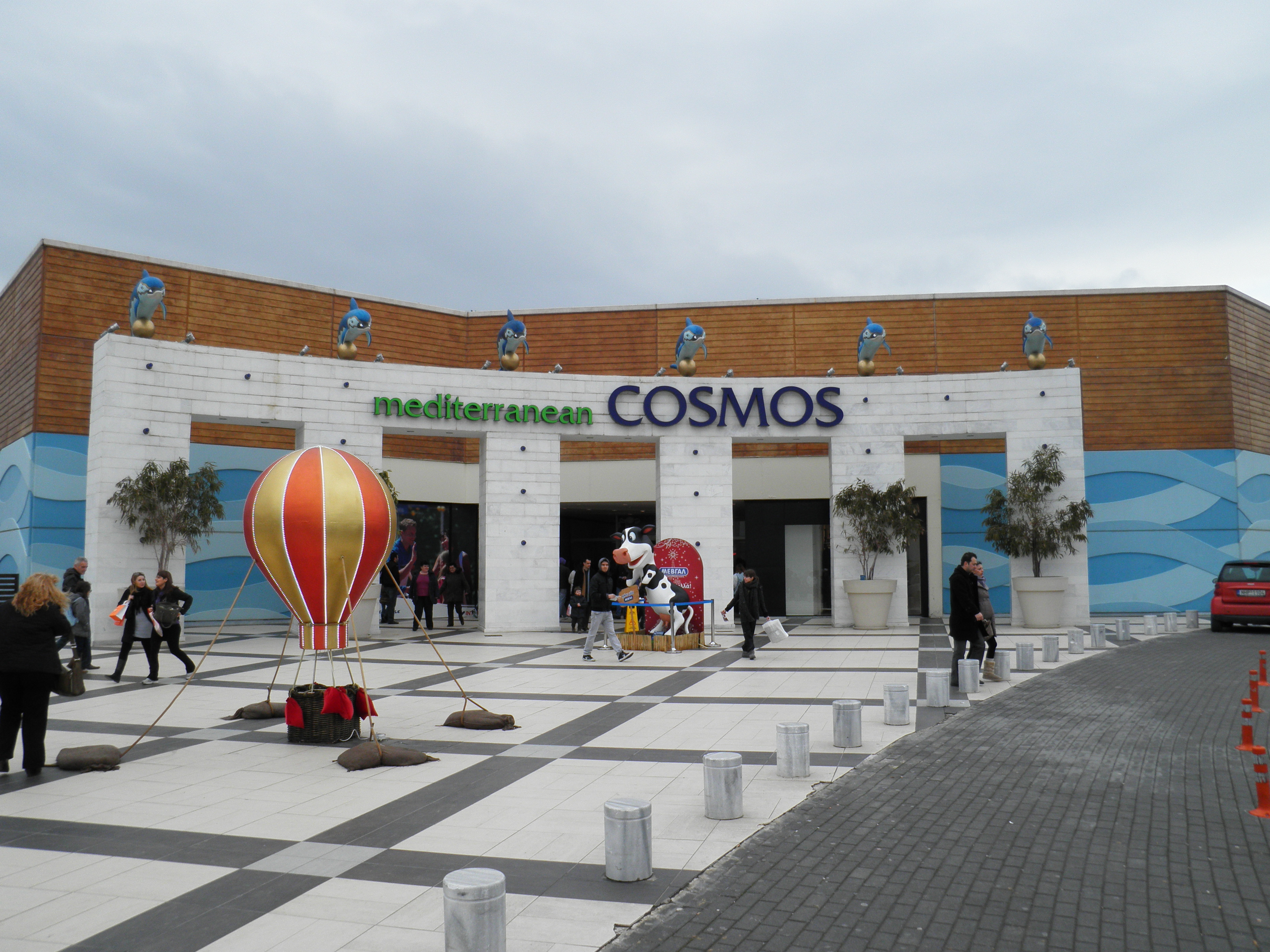
Mediterranean Cosmos Mall

== History ==
The first reference to Pylaia is found in the historian Thucydides, in 424 BC, under the name Strepsa. It was later known as Kapoutzida, from the Turkish word kapıcı ("gatekeeper"), deriving from the guards watching over the city walls of Byzantine Thessaloniki. The current name came into general use in 1927, and is derived from the word Pyle (πύλη), meaning gateway and referring to the Eastern Entrance of the city.

== Sports clubs ==
- Ethnikos Pylaias, football, volleyball, founded 1950

== Neighbourhoods ==
- Eleones
