= Gerakarou =

Gerakarou Γερακαρού
- Community
- Location within Greece
- Coordinates: 40°37.7′N 23°12.7′E
- Country: Greece
- Administrative region: Central Macedonia
- Regional unit: Thessaloniki
- Municipality: Langadas
- Municipal unit: Koroneia

Area
  - Community: 17.847 km^{2} (6.891 sq mi)
- Elevation: 140 m (460 ft)

Population (2021)
  - Community: 1,080
  - Density: 60.5/km^{2} (157/sq mi)
- Time zone: UTC+2 (EET)
  - Summer (DST): UTC+3 (EEST)
- Postal code: 570 12
- Area code: +30-2393
- Vehicle registration: NA to NX

Gerakarou (Greek: Γερακαρού) is a village and a community of the Langadas municipality. Before the 2011 local government reform it was part of the municipality of Koroneia, of which it was a municipal district. The 2021 census recorded 1,080 inhabitants in the village. The community of Gerakarou covers an area of 17.847 km^{2}.

== See also ==
- List of settlements in the Thessaloniki regional unit
