= Koroneia, Thessaloniki =

Koroneia Κορώνεια
- Municipal unit
- Location within the regional unit

- Location within Greece
- Coordinates: 40°38′N 23°13′E
- Country: Greece
- Administrative region: Central Macedonia
- Regional unit: Thessaloniki
- Municipality: Lagkadas

Area
  - Municipal unit: 105.613 km^{2} (40.777 sq mi)

Population (2021)
  - Municipal unit: 3,839
  - Municipal unit density: 36.35/km^{2} (94.15/sq mi)
- Time zone: UTC+2 (EET)
  - Summer (DST): UTC+3 (EEST)

Koroneia (Greek: Κορώνεια) is a former municipality in the Thessaloniki regional unit, Greece. Since the 2011 local government reform it is part of the municipality Lagkadas, of which it is a municipal unit. Population 3,839 (2021). The seat of the municipality was in Gerakarou. The municipal unit Koroneia has an area of 105.613 km^{2}.
