= Koufalia =

Town in Macedonia, Greece

Koufalia Κουφάλια
- Settlement
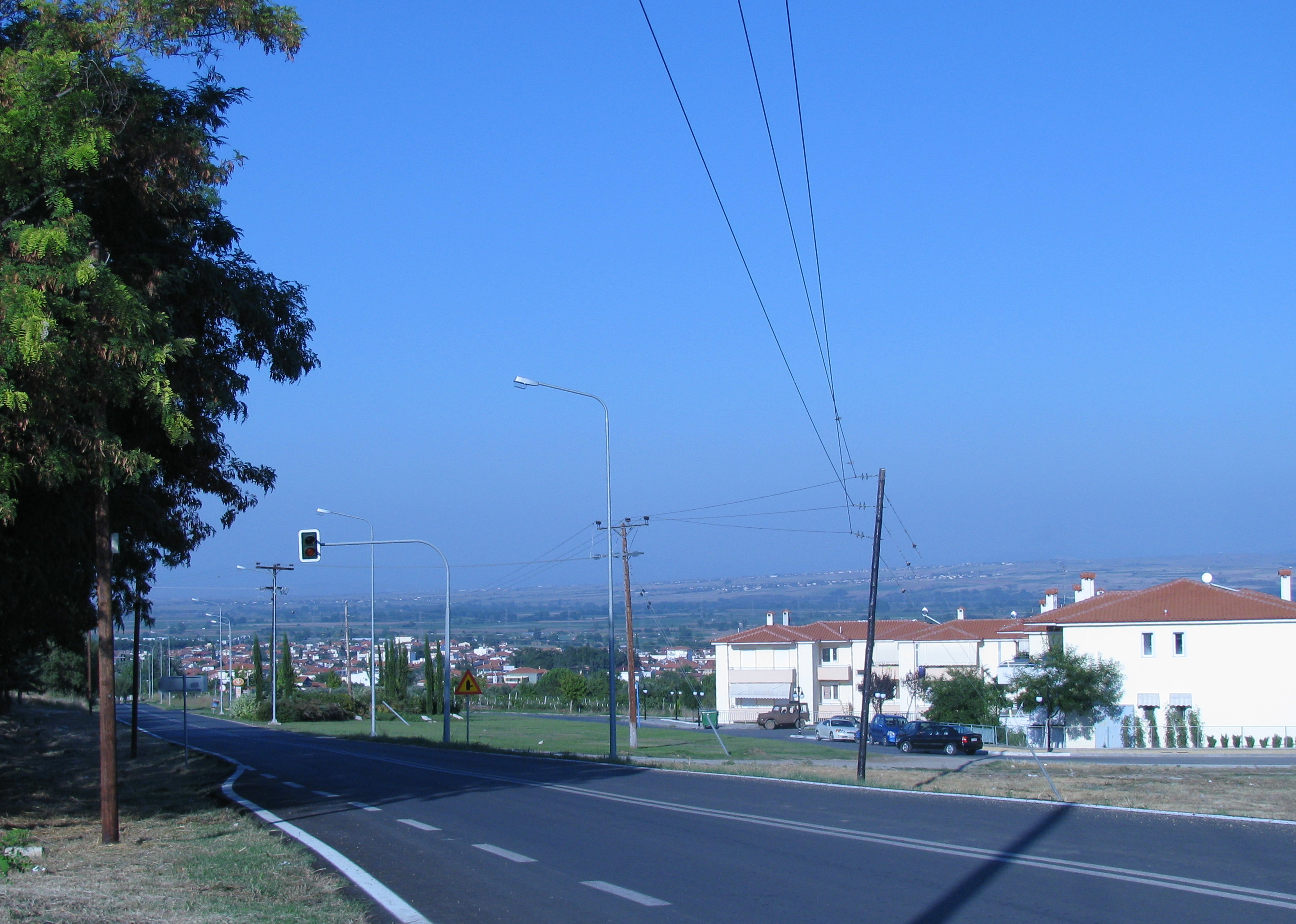

- Location within the regional unit

- Location within Greece
- Coordinates: 40°46.7′N 22°34.6′E
- Country: Greece
- Geographic region: Macedonia
- Administrative region: Central Macedonia
- Regional unit: Thessaloniki
- Municipality: Chalkidona

Area
  - Municipal unit: 106.128 km^{2} (40.976 sq mi)
  - Community: 67.591 km^{2} (26.097 sq mi)
- Elevation: 42 m (138 ft)

Population (2021)
  - Municipal unit: 9,462
  - Municipal unit density: 89.16/km^{2} (230.9/sq mi)
  - Community: 7,522
  - Community density: 111.3/km^{2} (288.2/sq mi)
- Time zone: UTC+2 (EET)
  - Summer (DST): UTC+3 (EEST)
- Postal code: 571 00
- Area code: +30-2391
- Vehicle registration: NA to NX

Koufalia (Greek: Κουφάλια) is a town and a municipal unit of the Chalkidona municipality in Thessaloniki regional unit, Macedonia, Greece. Koufalia is the seat of the municipality of Chalkidona. Before the 2011 local government reform it was a municipality.

== Administrative division ==
The municipal unit of Koufalia consists of two communities:

- Koufalia (population 7,522)
- Prochoma (population 1,940)

The aforementioned population figures are as of 2021.

== Geography ==
Koufalia is located 35 kilometres North-West of the City of Thessaloniki, and virtually by the Axios river. The community of Koufalia covers an area of 67.591 km^{2} while the municipal unit covers an area of 106,128 km^{2}.

== History ==
Koufalia is built north of the ancient city of Ichnae (IXNAI). Most of its population originates from the town of Kavakli in Bulgaria. They moved to the area after the 1919 signing of the Treaty of Neuilly between Greece and Bulgaria that forced a population exchange between the two countries. In return the mostly Bulgarian population of the village immigrated to Bulgaria, settling mainly on the Black Sea coast, in the area of Anchialos. The population called the city Koufalovo (Bulgarian: Куфалово). There are also Ntopioi and Greek refugees from Asia Minor and Thrace.

== Culture ==
It has a number of cultural organisations, the main one being “Megas Alexandros” (Alexander the Great); it was founded in 1980. It has its own lending library as well as a blood bank for humanitarian purposes. Every year it organises the “River Party” on the banks of the Axios river, from 24–26 July, and religious festivals (Greek: πανηγύρια).
