= Kallithea, Thessaloniki =

Kallithea Καλλιθέα
- Municipal unit
- Location within the regional unit

- Location within Greece
- Coordinates: 40°46′N 22°51′E
- Country: Greece
- Administrative region: Central Macedonia
- Regional unit: Thessaloniki
- Municipality: Oraiokastro

Area
  - Municipal unit: 97.494 km^{2} (37.643 sq mi)
- Elevation: 155 m (509 ft)

Population (2021)
  - Municipal unit: 6,548
  - Municipal unit density: 67.16/km^{2} (174.0/sq mi)
- Time zone: UTC+2 (EET)
  - Summer (DST): UTC+3 (EEST)

Kallithea (Greek: Καλλιθέα) is a suburb and a former municipality in the Thessaloniki regional unit, Greece. Since the 2011 local government reform it is part of the municipality Oraiokastro, of which it is a municipal unit. Population 6,548 (2021). The municipal unit has an area of 97.494 km^{2}.
