= Oraiokastro =

Oraiokastro Ωραιόκαστρο
- Municipality
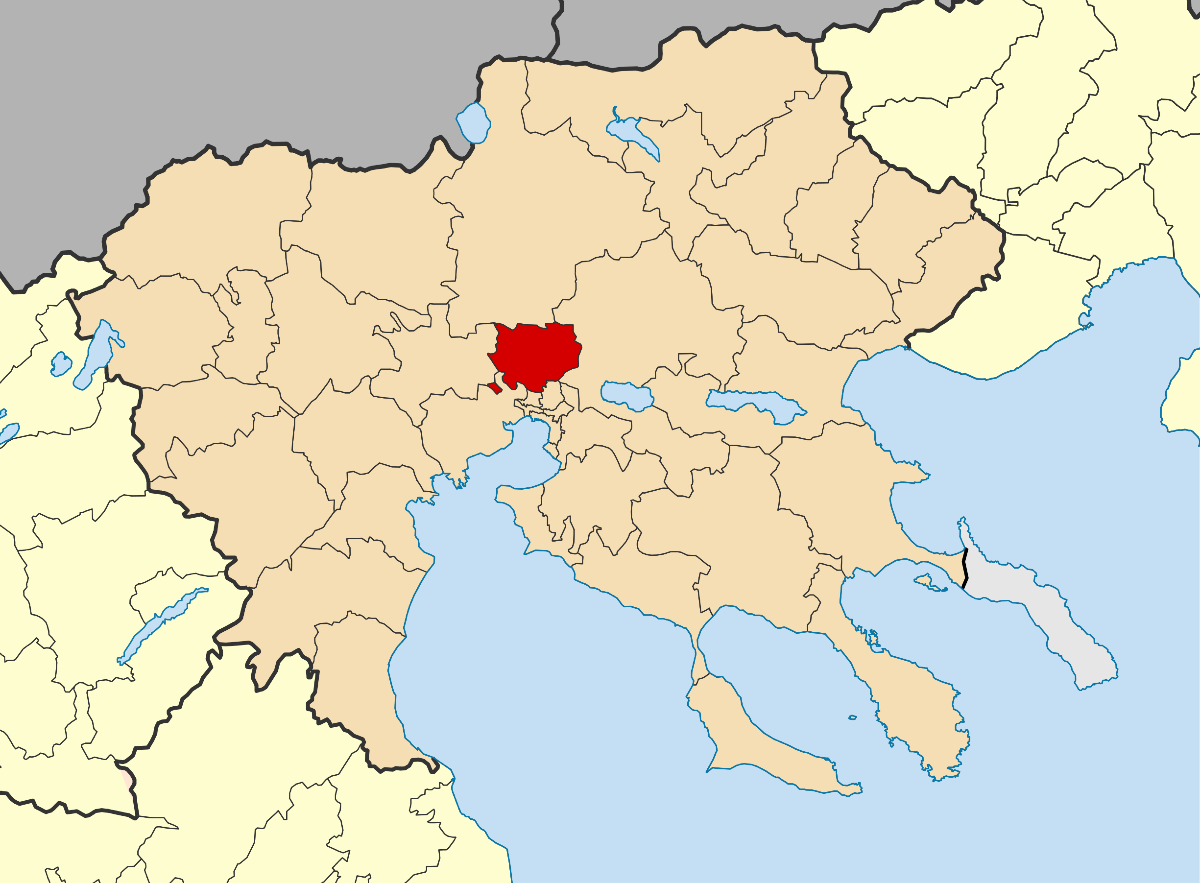

- Location within Greece
- Coordinates: 40°44′N 22°55′E
- Country: Greece
- Administrative region: Central Macedonia
- Regional unit: Thessaloniki

Area
  - Municipality: 217.86 km^{2} (84.12 sq mi)
  - Municipal unit: 21.855 km^{2} (8.438 sq mi)

Population (2021)
  - Municipality: 40,004
  - Density: 183.62/km^{2} (475.58/sq mi)
  - Municipal unit: 23,626
  - Municipal unit density: 1,081.0/km^{2} (2,799.9/sq mi)
- Time zone: UTC+2 (EET)
  - Summer (DST): UTC+3 (EEST)

Oraiokastro (Greek: Ωραιόκαστρο, also Oreokastro) is a municipality in the Thessaloniki regional unit, Greece, and a suburb of Thessaloniki.

== Municipality ==
The municipality Oraiokastro was formed at the 2011 local government reform by the merger of the following 3 former municipalities, that became municipal units:

- Kallithea
- Mygdonia
- Oraiokastro

The municipality has an area of 217.855 km^{2} and the municipal unit Oreokastro which is located 11 km north of Thessaloniki. has an area of 21.855 km^{2}. The municipality has a population of 40,004 inhabitants according to the October 2021 census.

== Religious buildings ==
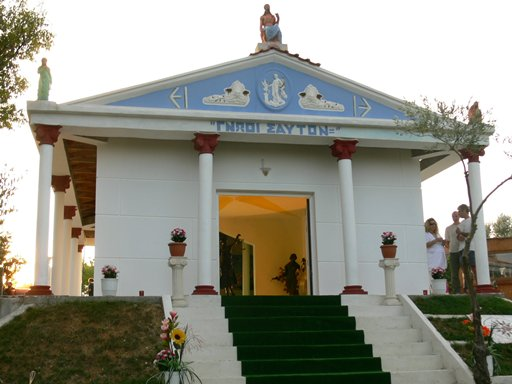
The Temple of the Hellenic Gods in Oraiokastro

The Temple of the Hellenic Gods (Ελλήνων Ναός), a Hellenic temple, is located in Oraiokastro.
