= Vasilika, Thessaloniki =

Vasilika Βασιλικά
- Municipal unit
- Location within the regional unit

- Location within Greece
- Coordinates: 40°28.8′N 23°8.2′E
- Country: Greece
- Administrative region: Central Macedonia
- Regional unit: Thessaloniki
- Municipality: Thermi

Area
  - Municipal unit: 200.336 km^{2} (77.350 sq mi)
  - Community: 56.81 km^{2} (21.93 sq mi)
- Elevation: 75 m (246 ft)

Population (2021)
  - Municipal unit: 9,578
  - Municipal unit density: 47.81/km^{2} (123.8/sq mi)
  - Community: 4,115
  - Community density: 72.43/km^{2} (187.6/sq mi)
- Time zone: UTC+2 (EET)
  - Summer (DST): UTC+3 (EEST)
- Postal code: 570 06
- Area code: +30-2396
- Vehicle registration: NA to NX

Vasilika (Greek: Βασιλικά) is a community and a municipal unit of the Thermi municipality. Before the 2011 local government reform the municipal unit of Vasilika was an independent municipality, with the respective community being the seat. The 2021 census recorded 4,115 inhabitants in the community and 9,578 inhabitants in the municipal unit. The community of Vasilika covers an area of 56.81 km^{2} while the respective municipal unit covers an area of 200.336 km^{2}.

According to the statistics of Vasil Kanchov ("Macedonia, Ethnography and Statistics"), 2.000 Greek Christians lived in the village in 1900.

== Administrative division ==
The community of Vasilika consists of two separate settlements (2021 populations):

- Lakkia (population 398)
- Vasilika (population 3,717)

== See also ==
- List of settlements in the Thessaloniki regional unit
