= Chortiatis =

Chortiatis Χορτιάτης
- Municipal unit
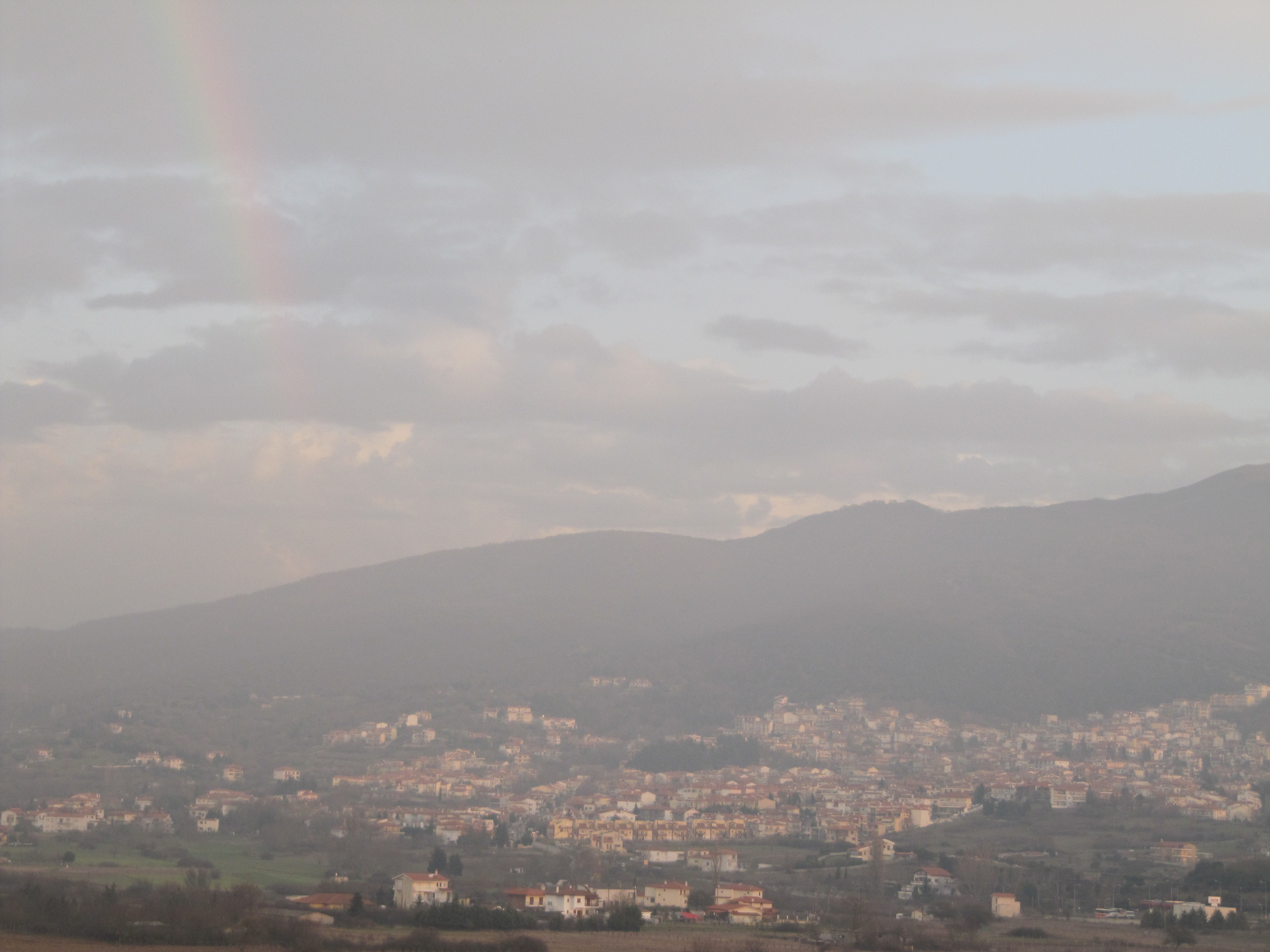

- Location within the regional unit

- Location within Greece
- Coordinates: 40°38′N 23°01′E
- Country: Greece
- Administrative region: Central Macedonia
- Regional unit: Thessaloniki
- Municipality: Pylaia-Chortiatis

Area
  - Municipal unit: 109.934 km^{2} (42.446 sq mi)
  - Community: 57.315 km^{2} (22.129 sq mi)
- Elevation: 475 m (1,558 ft)

Population (2021)
  - Municipal unit: 17,862
  - Municipal unit density: 162.48/km^{2} (420.82/sq mi)
  - Community: 4,515
  - Community density: 78.78/km^{2} (204.0/sq mi)
- Time zone: UTC+2 (EET)
  - Summer (DST): UTC+3 (EEST)
- Postal code: 570 xx
- Area code: 231
- Vehicle registration: Ν

Chortiatis (Greek: Χορτιάτης) is a suburb and a former municipality in the Thessaloniki regional unit, Greece. Since the 2011 Kallikratis local government reform it is part of the municipality Pylaia-Chortiatis, of which it is a municipal unit. It lies at 600 metres altitude on the slopes of the Mount Chortiatis, from which it takes its name. The municipal unit Chortiatis has an area of 109.934 km^{2}, and the community Chortiatis has an area of 57.315 km^{2}.

== History of the area ==
In antiquity, the mountain and the town were known as Cissus. Homer states that Cisseus was the king of this town. The town and its people are mentioned as members of the Delian League in the 5th century BC.

A Roman-era and early Byzantine aqueduct led from the mountain to Thessaloniki, and was kept in use throughout the centuries. It was repaired by the 12th-century Byzantine emperor Manuel I Komnenos and later in Ottoman times. Remains of a Byzantine-era fort also survive on the peak of the mountain.

The modern name and town Chortiatis can be traced back to Byzantine times, when a monastery with the name Chortaiton was established in the area, which survived until the 15th century. A settlement and fortress are attested in the same location by 1383, when they were attacked by the Ottomans, and were razed by the Ottoman prince Musa Çelebi around 1412. During the 1422–1430 Siege of Thessalonica, the location was disputed between Ottomans and Venetians, but apparently captured by the former in 1428. The village became seat of an Ottoman district (kaza) in the 15th and 16th centuries.

In 1912 the Greek town was liberated.

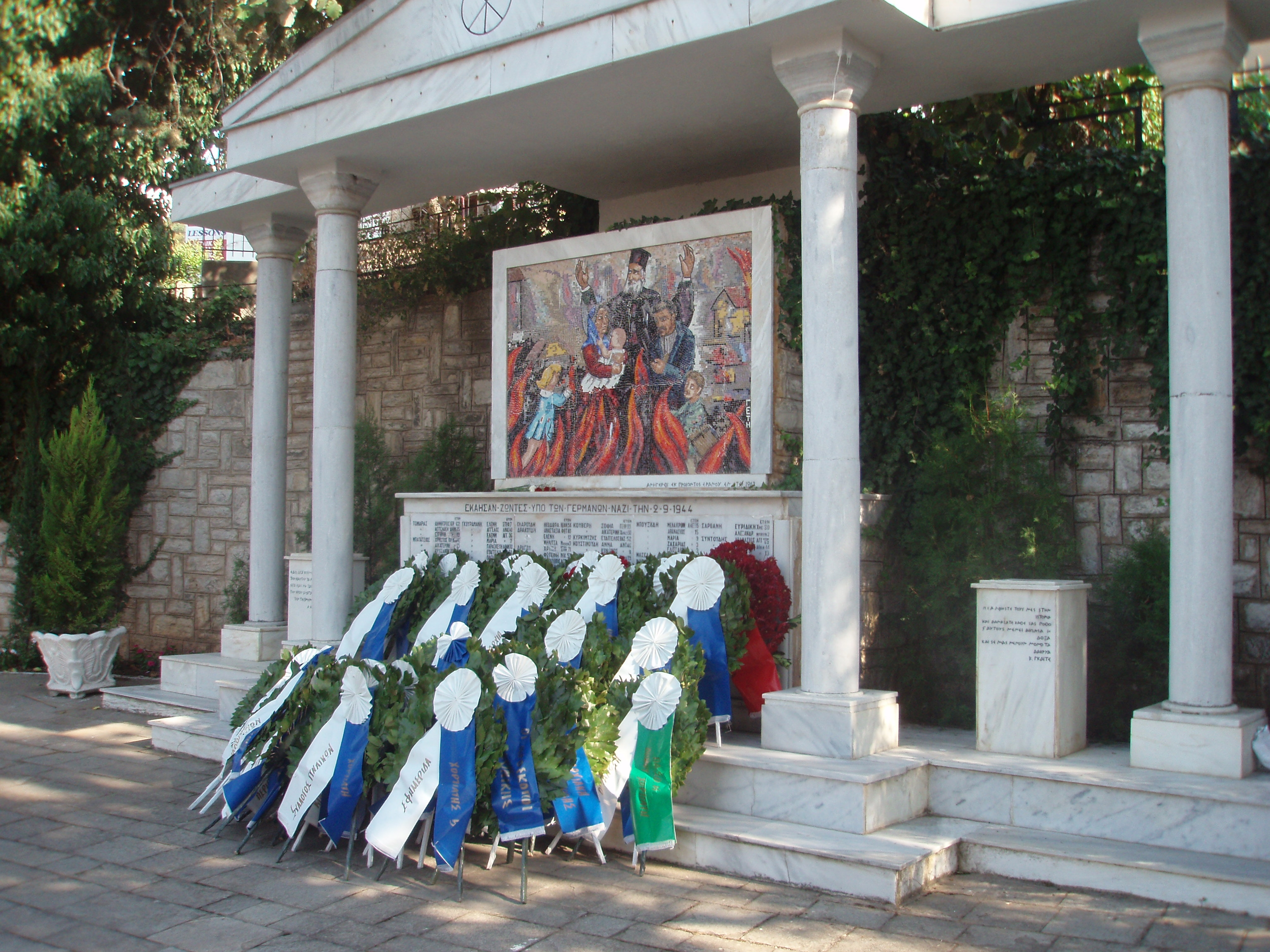
The Massacre Memorial

=== The Massacre of Chortiatis ===
The Chortiatis massacre was a World War II mass murder of 146 civilians by the Wehrmacht, at the end of the occupation of Greece by the Axis powers on 2 September 1944.

After an attack on two German soldiers, one German chemist and two Greek collaborators by the Greek People's Liberation Army (ELAS) on mount Chortiatis, where the two collaborators and the chemist were killed, the German occupation authorities decided to react immediately with a reprisal operation against the civilian population of the village Chortiatis. About twenty trucks with German soldiers and the paramilitary force Jagdkommando Schubert, named after the Wehrmacht sergeant Friedrich Schubert who was in command, surrounded the village. They gathered all the people they found in the town square. One group of the civilians was led into the house of villager Evangelos Ntinoudis. They were locked inside and burnt alive. The other group was locked in the bakery. Schubert's men set up machine guns to make sure that no one could flee out of the bakery. But one 6-year-old girl managed to flee with help of the others outside a window which was unprotected. The others were burnt alive. Apart from the people who were killed in the two groups, others were raped and killed outside their homes or even in the village, while trying to escape. A total of 146 civilians residents of Chortiatis were killed that day. 109 of them were women and girls. One week later the Germans came back and set the whole village on fire. 300 homes were burned down.
