= List of settlements in the Thessaloniki regional unit =

This is a list of settlements in the Thessaloniki regional unit, Greece:

- Adam
- Adendro
- Agia Paraskevi
- Agia Triada
- Agios Antonios
- Agios Athanasios
- Agios Charalambos
- Agios Pavlos
- Agios Vasileios
- Akropotamos
- Ampelokipoi
- Analipsi
- Anatoliko
- Anchialos
- Angelochori
- Ano Scholari
- Ano Stavros
- Anoixia
- Apollonia
- Ardameri
- Arethousa
- Areti
- Askos
- Asprovalta
- Assiros
- Asvestochori
- Avgi
- Chalastra
- Chalkidona
- Chorouda
- Chortiatis
- Chrysavgi
- Diavata
- Dorkada
- Drakontio
- Drymos
- Efkarpia
- Eleftherio-Kordelio
- Eleousa
- Epanomi
- Evangelismos
- Evosmos
- Exalofos
- Exochi
- Filadelfio
- Filothei
- Filyro
- Galini
- Gefyra
- Gerakarou
- Irakleio
- Kalamaria
- Kalamoto
- Kalochori
- Kardia
- Karteres
- Kastanas
- Kato Scholari
- Kato Stefanina
- Kavallari
- Kokkalou
- Kolchiko
- Koufalia
- Krithia
- Kryoneri
- Kymina
- Lachanas
- Lakkia
- Lagkadikia
- Lagyna
- Langadas
- Lefkochori
- Lefkouda
- Liti
- Limni
- Livadi
- Lofiskos
- Loudias
- Loutra Volvis
- Mavrorrachi
- Mavrouda
- Megali Volvi
- Melissochori
- Melissourgos
- Menemeni
- Mesaio
- Mesimeri
- Mesokomo
- Mesopotamo
- Mikra Volvi
- Mikrokomi
- Mikro Monastiri
- Modi
- Monolofo
- Monopigado
- Nea Apollonia
- Nea Filadelfeia
- Nea Kallindoia
- Nea Kerasia
- Nea Madytos
- Nea Magnisia
- Nea Malgara
- Nea Mesimvria
- Nea Michaniona
- Nea Raidestos
- Nea Vrasna
- Neapoli
- Neo Rysio
- Neochorouda
- Neoi Epivates
- Nikomidino
- Nikopoli
- Nymfopetra
- Oraiokastro
- Ossa
- Paliampela
- Panorama
- Partheni
- Pefka
- Pentalofos
- Pente Vryses
- Peraia
- Peristera
- Peristerona
- Perivolaki
- Petrokerasa
- Petroto
- Plagiari
- Plateia
- Polichni
- Polydendri
- Prochoma
- Profitis
- Pylaia
- Sarakina
- Scholari
- Sindos
- Skepasto
- Sochos
- Souroti
- Spitakia
- Stavros
- Stavroupoli
- Stefania
- Stefanina
- Stivos
- Sykies
- Tagarades
- Thermi
- Thessaloniki
- Triandria
- Trilofos
- Vaiochori
- Valtochori
- Vamvakia
- Vasilika
- Vasiloudi
- Vathylakkos
- Vertiskos
- Volvi
- Vrachia
- Vrasna
- Xirochori
- Xiropotamos
- Xylopoli
- Zagliveri

== By municipality ==
Kalamaria (no subdivisions)

== See also ==
- List of towns and villages in Greece
