= Diavata =

Town in Central Macedonia, Greece

Diavata Διαβατά
- Community
- Location within Greece
- Coordinates: 40°41.3′N 22°51.5′E
- Country: Greece
- Administrative region: Central Macedonia
- Regional unit: Thessaloniki
- Municipality: Delta
- Municipal unit: Echedoros

Area
  - Community: 8.967 km^{2} (3.462 sq mi)
- Elevation: 20 m (66 ft)

Population (2021)
  - Community: 11,876
  - Density: 1,324/km^{2} (3,430/sq mi)
- Time zone: UTC+2 (EET)
  - Summer (DST): UTC+3 (EEST)
- Postal code: 570 08
- Area code: +30-231
- Vehicle registration: NA to NX

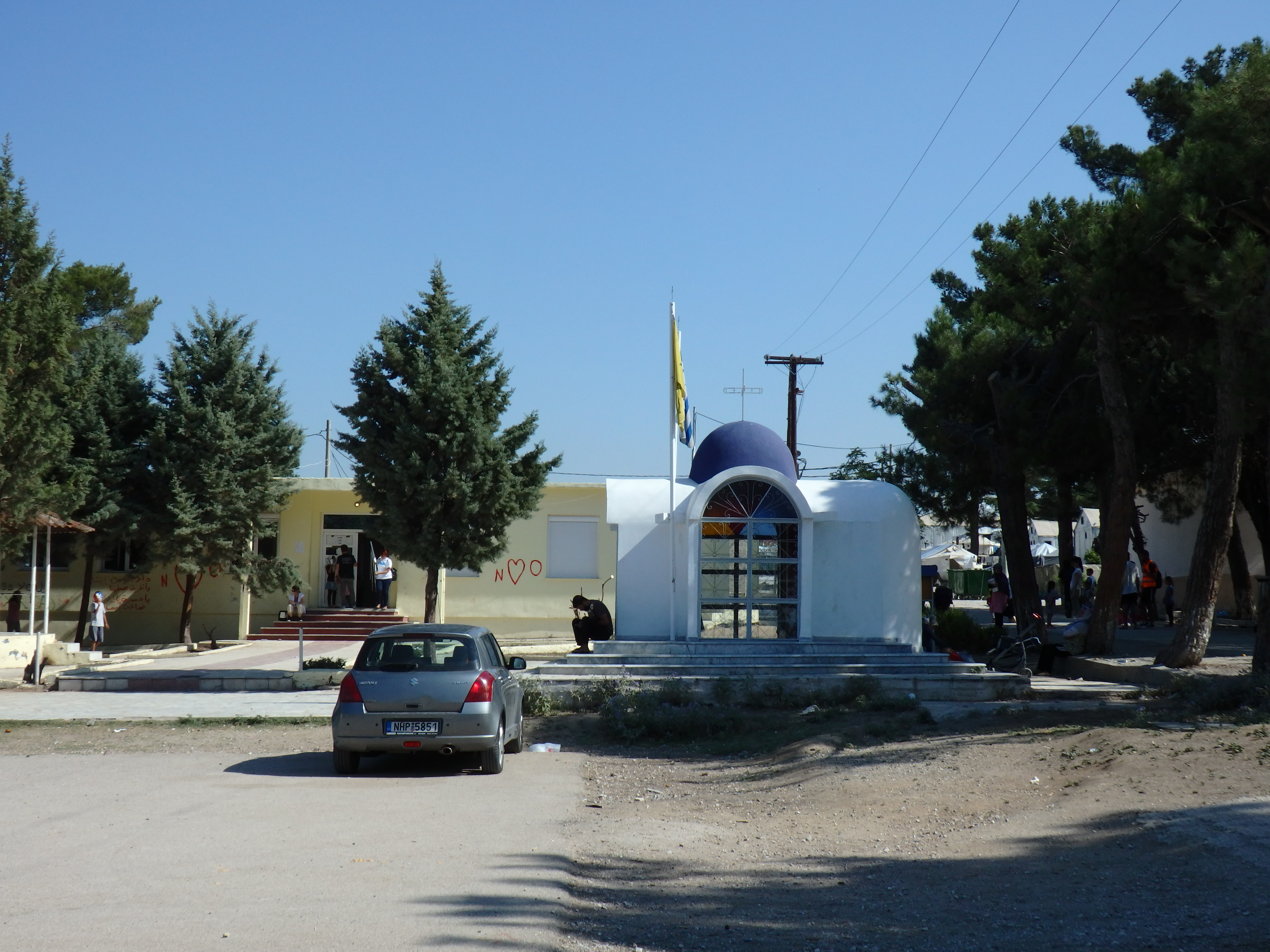
View of the main square in Diavata.

Diavata (Greek: Διαβατά) is a town in the Central Macedonia region of Greece. Administratively, it is a community of the municipality of Delta, while before the 2011 local government reform it was part of the municipality of Echedoros, of which it was a municipal district. The community of Diavata covers an area of 8.967 km^{2} (3.462 sq mi). Many inhabitants are descendants from the Armenian majority town of Eğin in Anatolia who survived the Armenian genocide and were resettled in the 1923 population exchange between Greece and Turkey.

== See also ==
- List of settlements in the Thessaloniki regional unit
