= Kardia, Thessaloniki =

Kardia Καρδία
- Community
- Location within Greece
- Coordinates: 40°28.1′N 22°59.7′E
- Country: Greece
- Administrative region: Central Macedonia
- Regional unit: Thessaloniki
- Municipality: Thermi
- Municipal unit: Mikra

Area
  - Community: 9.652 km^{2} (3.727 sq mi)
- Elevation: 180 m (590 ft)

Population (2021)
  - Community: 3,369
  - Density: 349.0/km^{2} (904.0/sq mi)
- Time zone: UTC+2 (EET)
  - Summer (DST): UTC+3 (EEST)
- Postal code: 575 00
- Area code: +30-2392
- Vehicle registration: NA to NX

Kardia (Greek: Καρδία) is a village and a community of the Thermi municipality. Before the 2011 local government reform it was part of the municipality of Mikra, of which it was a municipal district. The 2021 census recorded 3,369 inhabitants in the village. The community of Kardia covers an area of 9.652 km^{2}.

== See also ==
- List of settlements in the Thessaloniki regional unit
