= Kato Scholari =

Kato Scholari Κάτω Σχολάρι
- Community
- Location within Greece
- Coordinates: 40°25.7′N 23°1.8′E
- Country: Greece
- Administrative region: Central Macedonia
- Regional unit: Thessaloniki
- Municipality: Thermi
- Municipal unit: Mikra

Area
  - Community: 23.8 km^{2} (9.2 sq mi)
- Elevation: 210 m (690 ft)

Population (2021)
  - Community: 1,963
  - Density: 82.5/km^{2} (214/sq mi)
- Time zone: UTC+2 (EET)
  - Summer (DST): UTC+3 (EEST)
- Postal code: 575 00
- Area code: +30-2392
- Vehicle registration: NA to NX

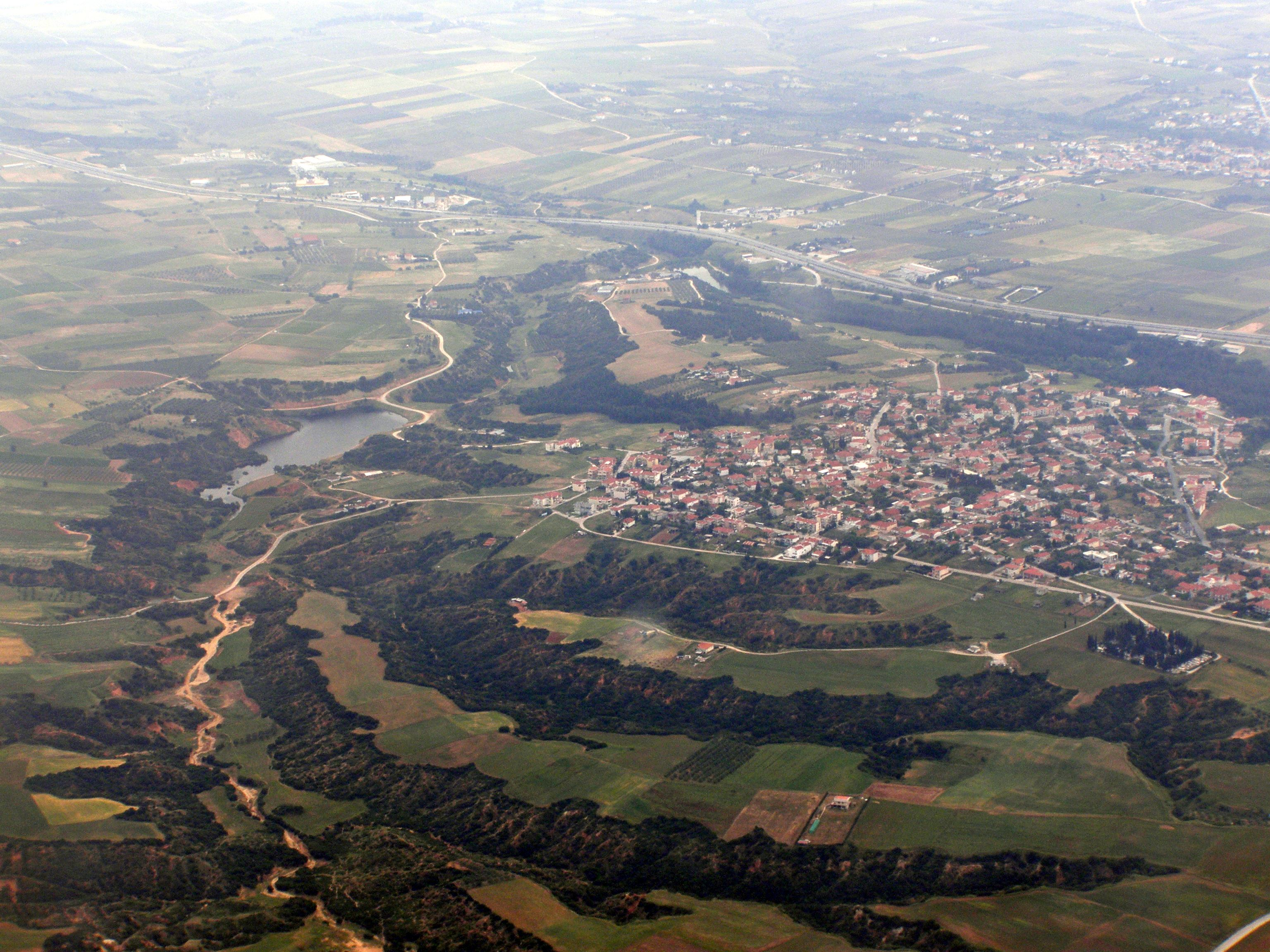
Aerial photo of Kato Scholari

Kato Scholari (Greek: Κάτω Σχολάρι) is a village and a community of the Thermi municipality. Before the 2011 local government reform it was part of the municipality of Mikra, of which it was a municipal district. The 2021 census recorded 1,963 inhabitants in the village. The community of Kato Scholari covers an area of 23.80 km^{2}.

== See also ==
- List of settlements in the Thessaloniki regional unit
