= Plagiari, Thessaloniki =

Plagiari Πλαγιάρι
- Community
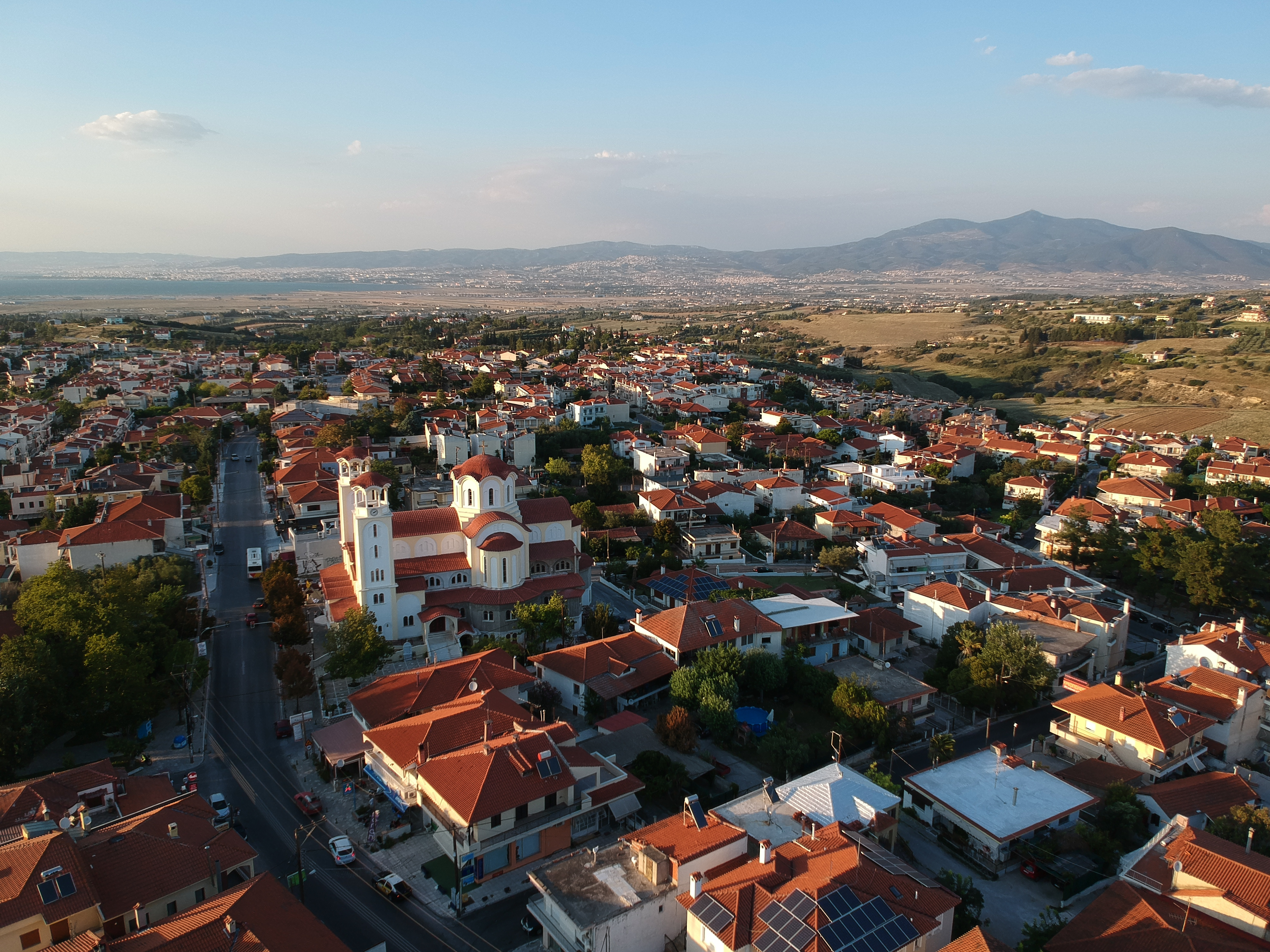

- Location within Greece
- Coordinates: 40°28.4′N 22°57.5′E
- Country: Greece
- Administrative region: Central Macedonia
- Regional unit: Thessaloniki
- Municipality: Thermi
- Municipal unit: Mikra

Area
  - Community: 12.5 km^{2} (4.8 sq mi)
- Elevation: 140 m (460 ft)

Population (2021)
  - Community: 5,091
  - Density: 407/km^{2} (1,050/sq mi)
- Time zone: UTC+2 (EET)
  - Summer (DST): UTC+3 (EEST)
- Postal code: 575 00
- Area code: +30-2392
- Vehicle registration: NA to NX

Plagiari (Greek: Πλαγιάρι) is a village and a community of the Thermi municipality. Before the 2011 local government reform it was part of the municipality of Mikra, of which it was a municipal district. The 2021 census recorded 5,091 inhabitants in the village. The community of Plagiari covers an area of 12.50 km^{2}.

== See also ==
- List of settlements in the Thessaloniki regional unit

== Bus routes ==
Plagiari is accessible from its main line, 69 ,which passes into the town and has three bus stops inside of the town, as well as some others outside of it
