= Nea Magnisia =

Nea Magnisia Νέα Μαγνησία
- Community
- Location within Greece
- Coordinates: 40°41.3′N 22°50.6′E
- Country: Greece
- Administrative region: Central Macedonia
- Regional unit: Thessaloniki
- Municipality: Delta
- Municipal unit: Echedoros

Area
  - Community: 14.805 km^{2} (5.716 sq mi)
- Elevation: 18 m (59 ft)

Population (2021)
  - Community: 4,088
  - Density: 276.1/km^{2} (715.2/sq mi)
- Time zone: UTC+2 (EET)
  - Summer (DST): UTC+3 (EEST)
- Postal code: 570 08
- Area code: +30-231
- Vehicle registration: NA to NX

Nea Magnisia (Greek: Νέα Μαγνησία), before 1927 known as Arapli (Greek: Αραπλή), is a town and a community of the Delta municipality. Before the 2011 local government reform it was part of the municipality of Echedoros, of which it was a municipal district. The 2021 census recorded 4,088 inhabitants in the village. The community of Nea Magnisia covers an area of 14.805 km^{2}.

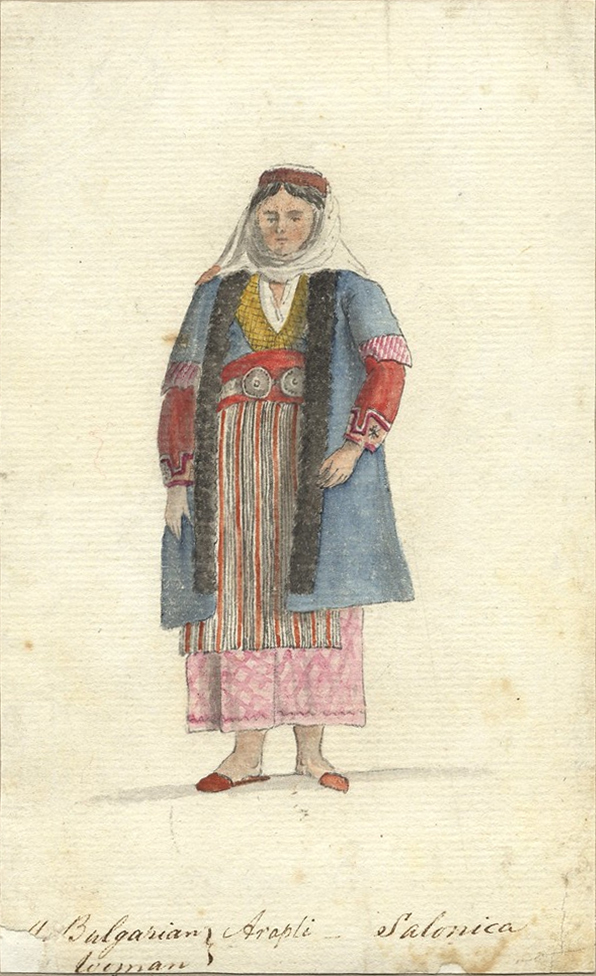
A Bulgarian woman from Arapli (1804)

== See also ==
- List of settlements in the Thessaloniki regional unit
