= 1978 Thessaloniki earthquake =

Earthquake in Greece

- Location within Greece
- UTC time: 1978-06-20 20:03
- ISC event: 681154
- USGS-ANSS: ComCat
- Local date: 20 June 1978
- Local time: 23:03
- Magnitude: 6.2 M_{w}
- Depth: 16.0 km (9.9 mi)
- Epicenter: 40.6°N 23.3°E
- Fault: Thessaloniki–Gerakarou Fault Zone
- Type: Normal
- Areas affected: Greece
- Total damage: $250 million – $1 billion
- Max. intensity: MMI VIII (Severe)
- Casualties: 45–50 killed 100–220 injured

The 1978 Thessaloniki earthquake (Greek: Μεγάλος Σεισμός της Θεσσαλονίκης) occurred on 20 June at 23:03 local time, registering 6.5 on the moment magnitude scale and causing severe shaking (VIII on the Mercalli intensity scale). The earthquake affected Thessaloniki and surrounding villages, causing extensive damage, killing 45 people (including 38 from a collapsed eight-storey building in the city centre), and injuring between 100 and 220 others. It was the largest event in the area since the 1932 Ierissos earthquake, with tremors felt throughout northern Greece, Yugoslavia, and Bulgaria. The earthquake occurred along the Thessaloniki–Gerakarou Fault Zone and was preceded by significant foreshocks. The estimated damage ranged from $250 million to $1 billion (in 1978 dollars).

== Tectonic setting ==
Thessaloniki is sited in an area that has been affected by extensional tectonics since the Late Miocene. During the Late Miocene to Pliocene, the direction of stretching of the crust was southwest–northeast, producing a series of northwest–southeast trending normal faults and related basins, such as the Mygdonian graben. In the Quaternary, the direction of stretching changed to being north–south trending, creating new west–east normal faults and modifying the existing NW-SE structures. This latter phase of stretching is interpreted to be a result of slab rollback of the northward subducting oceanic crust of the African plate beneath the Aegean Sea plate.

== Earthquake sequence ==
The mainshock of the 1978 Thessaloniki earthquake sequence occurred on 20 June with a magnitude of 6.5. It was preceded by significant foreshocks, particularly a magnitude 5.6 event on 23 May and another event of magnitude 5.2 on 19 June. The mainshock occurred at a depth of about 8 kilometres beneath the Mygdonian graben, a geological basin northeast of Thessaloniki filled with sediments and partly occupied by Lakes Langada and Volvi. Studies suggest that the initial earthquake ruptured along an east-northeast-oriented fault segment near Gerakarou, while the subsequent mainshock activated fault segments further west along the TGFZ.

=== Fault ===
The 1978 Thessaloniki earthquake was associated with movements along the Thessaloniki–Gerakarou Fault Zone (TGFZ), a major fault system extending roughly 20 kilometres from the village of Gerakarou westwards to the city of Thessaloniki. The TGFZ exhibits a consistent dip towards the north and includes a complex network of faults, predominantly oriented east–west, with multiple branch-like splits and some intersecting faults trending towards the northeast. This network fits into the wider regional stress field, characterised by north–south extensional forces, which are progressively altering the older northwest–southeast geological fabric of the region.

Surface ruptures caused by the earthquake were concentrated along three main lines, with the longest rupture following the southwestern margin of the Mygdonian graben between Lakes Langada and Volvi. Extensive surface deformation, including liquefaction (where water-saturated soil temporarily loses its stiffness and behaves like a fluid), was reported in the valley between the lakes, correlating closely with areas of greatest slip and subsidence identified by subsequent studies.

=== Fault interactions ===
The cumulative impact of these earthquakes resulted in a stress transfer along the fault system, increasing the likelihood of further seismic activity. Calculations of stress changes following the foreshock showed that the mainshock indeed occurred in a region where stress had significantly increased, supporting theories of stress-triggered fault reactivation. Stress analyses after the mainshock indicate that western segments of the TGFZ have experienced increased stress levels, highlighting potential seismic hazard for Thessaloniki from future earthquakes along this fault zone.

== Damage ==
The foreshock on 24 May caused damage in villages near its epicentre, such as Stivos, Scholari, Peristeronas, and Gerakarou. These same villages suffered severe damage during the 20 June mainshock, with many buildings badly affected or destroyed. Significant destruction also occurred in Thessaloniki, where 45 people lost their lives, including 38 who died due to the collapse of an eight-storey reinforced concrete building in the city centre. Eight other families that lived in that block were fortunately on vacation when the earthquake struck. Two other similar blocks in that area were rendered unusable by the damage. All three of these buildings were built on fill on the site of the old hippodrome, which may explain the extent of the damage. Many older buildings in the city suffered serious damage, particularly involving wall collapse.

Some of Thessaloniki's ancient monuments were badly damaged, including the Rotunda of Galerius and the churches of Hagia Sophia and Agios Pantaleimon, causing their temporary closure. Parapets on the White Tower of Thessaloniki were damaged, as was a minaret. Most of the city's hospitals were evacuated due to the damage they suffered. In the eastern part of the city, telephone communication was lost due to the exchange at Toumba being seriously damaged.

== Aftermath ==
At the time of this earthquake sequence, Greece was still using a building code from 1959 and legislation on "Emergency Planning Policy" that governed how the army would react in case of war or peacetime emergencies. The 1959 Seismic Code resulted in many buildings using reinforced concrete and there were no other preventative measures in place. The planning measures proved entirely inadequate in the face of the extent of the damage that left many of the inhabitants of Thessaloniki in need of emergency shelter. Despite the lack of any pre-existing structure, a response and rescue was quickly organised, involving the Police, the Army and the Technical Chamber of Greece, with the Prime Minister taking overall charge.

Systematic assessment of building damage began on 24 June, with all buildings having a sign affixed, green for those still considered habitable as they were, yellow for those that needed some repairs but could be lived in with care and orange for those that were seriously damaged and either too dangerous to use or in need of a detailed second inspection. In total, out of the 62,917 buildings inspected, 20.4% were classified as yellow and a further 5.8% were classified as orange.

Following the Thessaloniki earthquakes, a new law was passed that laid out how repairs for earthquake damage would be paid as a mixture of interest-free loans and grants from the government. This also led to the setting up of two new institutions, the Earthquake Damaged Buildings Compensation Service of Northern Greece and the Institute of Engineering Seismology and Earthquake Engineering.

== Future seismic hazard ==
Historical records suggest repeated large seismic events (with magnitudes around or greater than 6.0) in the broader Thessaloniki region. The geometry and extent of the fault system indicate that the TGFZ is part of a larger fault structure known as the Thessaloniki–Rentina Fault System (TRFS), stretching about 65 kilometres from Thessaloniki eastwards to the Strymonian Gulf. This fault system comprises segments of faults arranged in a left-stepping pattern with connecting faults bridging between main segments. Given this extensive and active tectonic framework, the western segments, including those close to Thessaloniki itself, pose a considerable seismic risk. Consequently, the potential reactivation of the TGFZ presents a major seismic threat to the metropolitan area of Thessaloniki.
