= Vrachia =

Vrachia Βραχιά
- Community
- Location within Greece
- Coordinates: 40°39.7′N 22°38.5′E
- Country: Greece
- Administrative region: Central Macedonia
- Regional unit: Thessaloniki
- Municipality: Delta
- Municipal unit: Axios

Area
  - Community: 15.036 km^{2} (5.805 sq mi)
- Elevation: 9 m (30 ft)

Population (2021)
  - Community: 445
  - Density: 29.6/km^{2} (76.7/sq mi)
- Time zone: UTC+2 (EET)
  - Summer (DST): UTC+3 (EEST)
- Postal code: 570 07
- Area code: +30-2391
- Vehicle registration: NA to NX

Vrachia (Greek: Βραχιά) is a village and a community of the Delta municipality. Before the 2011 local government reform it was part of the municipality of Axios, of which it was a municipal district. The 2021 census recorded 445 inhabitants in the village. The community of Vrachia covers an area of 15.036 km^{2}.

== See also ==
- List of settlements in the Thessaloniki regional unit
