= Vathylakkos =

Vathylakkos (Greek: Βαθύλακκος, "deep ditch") may refer to several places in Greece:

- Vathylakkos, Drama, a village in the municipality of Drama
- Vathylakkos, Karditsa, a village in the Menelaida municipal unit
- Vathylakkos, Kozani, a village in the Kozani regional unit
- Vathylakkos, Thessaloniki, a town in the municipality of Chalkidona, Thessaloniki regional unit
