= Agia Paraskevi, Thessaloniki =

Agia Paraskevi Αγία Παρασκευή
- Community
- Location within Greece
- Coordinates: 40°28.9′N 23°2.9′E
- Country: Greece
- Administrative region: Central Macedonia
- Regional unit: Thessaloniki
- Municipality: Thermi
- Municipal unit: Vasilika

Area
  - Community: 15.574 km^{2} (6.013 sq mi)
- Elevation: 95 m (312 ft)

Population (2021)
  - Community: 2,152
  - Density: 138.2/km^{2} (357.9/sq mi)
- Time zone: UTC+2 (EET)
  - Summer (DST): UTC+3 (EEST)
- Postal code: 570 00
- Area code: +30-2396
- Vehicle registration: NA to NX

Agia Paraskevi (Greek: Αγία Παρασκευή) is a village and a community of the Thermi municipality. Before the 2011 local government reform it was part of the municipality of Vasilika, of which it was a municipal district. The 2021 census recorded 2,152 inhabitants in the village. The community of Agia Paraskevi covers an area of 15.574 km^{2}.

== See also ==
- List of settlements in the Thessaloniki regional unit
