= Adam, Thessaloniki =

Adam Αδάμ
- Community
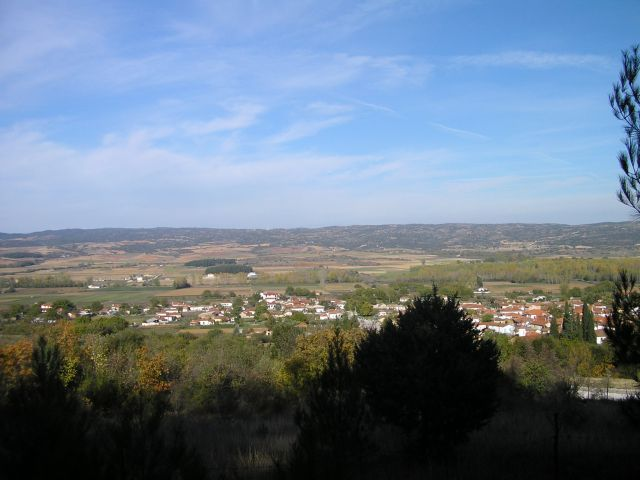

- Location within Greece
- Coordinates: 40°33.25′N 23°18.15′E
- Country: Greece
- Administrative region: Central Macedonia
- Regional unit: Thessaloniki
- Municipality: Lagkadas
- Municipal unit: Kallindoia

Area
  - Community: 18.146 km^{2} (7.006 sq mi)
- Elevation: 240 m (790 ft)

Population (2021)
  - Community: 387
  - Density: 21.3/km^{2} (55.2/sq mi)
- Time zone: UTC+2 (EET)
  - Summer (DST): UTC+3 (EEST)
- Postal code: 570 12
- Area code: +30-2393
- Vehicle registration: NA to NX

Adam (Greek: Αδάμ) is a village and a community of the Lagkadas municipality. Before the 2011 local government reform it was part of the municipality of Kallindoia, of which it was a municipal district. The 2021 census recorded 387 inhabitants in the village. The community of Adam covers an area of 18.146 km^{2}.

== See also ==
- List of settlements in the Thessaloniki regional unit
