= Nikopoli, Thessaloniki =

Nikopoli Νικόπολη
- Community
- Location within Greece
- Coordinates: 40°53.25′N 23°10.8′E
- Country: Greece
- Administrative region: Central Macedonia
- Regional unit: Thessaloniki
- Municipality: Lagkadas
- Municipal unit: Lachanas

Area
  - Community: 20.349 km^{2} (7.857 sq mi)
- Elevation: 570 m (1,870 ft)

Population (2021)
  - Community: 82
  - Density: 4.0/km^{2} (10/sq mi)
- Time zone: UTC+2 (EET)
  - Summer (DST): UTC+3 (EEST)
- Postal code: 570 17
- Area code: +30-2394
- Vehicle registration: NA to NX

Nikopoli (Greek: Νικόπολη, Bulgarian: Зарово), known before 1927 as Zarovo (Ζάροβο), is a village and a community of the Lagkadas municipality. Before the 2011 local government reform it was part of the municipality of Lachanas, of which it was a municipal district. The 2021 census recorded 82 inhabitants in the village. The community of Nikopoli covers an area of 20.349 km^{2}.

== See also ==
- List of settlements in the Thessaloniki regional unit
