= Valtochori =

Valtochori Βαλτοχώρι
- Community
- Location within Greece
- Coordinates: 40°43.1′N 22°38.2′E
- Country: Greece
- Administrative region: Central Macedonia
- Regional unit: Thessaloniki
- Municipality: Chalkidona
- Municipal unit: Chalkidona

Area
  - Community: 16.747 km^{2} (6.466 sq mi)
- Elevation: 18 m (59 ft)

Population (2021)
  - Community: 179
  - Density: 10.7/km^{2} (27.7/sq mi)
- Time zone: UTC+2 (EET)
  - Summer (DST): UTC+3 (EEST)
- Postal code: 570 07
- Area code: +30-2391
- Vehicle registration: NA to NX

Valtochori (Greek: Βαλτοχώρι) is a village and a community of the Chalkidona municipality. Before the 2011 local government reform it was part of the municipality of Chalkidona, of which it was a municipal district. The 2021 census recorded 179 inhabitants in the community. The community of Valtochori covers an area of 16.747 km^{2}.

== See also ==
- List of settlements in the Thessaloniki regional unit
