= Perivolaki, Thessaloniki =

Perivolaki Περιβολάκι
- Community
- Location within Greece
- Coordinates: 40°44.7′N 23°2.1′E
- Country: Greece
- Administrative region: Central Macedonia
- Regional unit: Thessaloniki
- Municipality: Lagkadas
- Municipal unit: Lagkadas

Area
  - Community: 7.625 km^{2} (2.944 sq mi)
- Elevation: 19 m (62 ft)

Population (2021)
  - Community: 1,331
  - Density: 174.6/km^{2} (452.1/sq mi)
- Time zone: UTC+2 (EET)
  - Summer (DST): UTC+3 (EEST)
- Postal code: 572 00
- Area code: +30-2394
- Vehicle registration: NA to NX

Perivolaki (Greek: Περιβολάκι) is a village and a community of the Lagkadas municipality. Before the 2011 local government reform it was part of the municipality of Lagkadas, of which it was a municipal district. The 2021 census recorded 1,331 inhabitants in the village. The community of Perivolaki covers an area of 7.625 km^{2}.

== See also ==
- List of settlements in the Thessaloniki regional unit
