= Kymina =

Kymina Κύμινα
- Community
- Location within Greece
- Coordinates: 40°36.8′N 22°41.5′E
- Country: Greece
- Administrative region: Central Macedonia
- Regional unit: Thessaloniki
- Municipality: Delta
- Municipal unit: Axios

Area
  - Community: 29.276 km^{2} (11.304 sq mi)
- Elevation: 8 m (26 ft)

Population (2021)
  - Community: 3.210
  - Density: 0.1096/km^{2} (0.2840/sq mi)
- Time zone: UTC+2 (EET)
  - Summer (DST): UTC+3 (EEST)
- Postal code: 573 00
- Area code: +30-2391
- Vehicle registration: NA to NX

Kymina (Greek: Κύμινα) is a town in the western suburbs of Thessaloniki and a community of the Delta municipality. Before the 2011 local government reform it was part of the municipality of Axios, of which it was a municipal district. The 2021 census recorded 3,210 inhabitants in the town. The community of Kymina covers an area of 29.276 km^{2}.

== See also ==
- List of settlements in the Thessaloniki regional unit
