= Anchialos, Thessaloniki =

Anchialos Αγχίαλος
- Community
- Location within Greece
- Coordinates: 40°42.9′N 22°46.8′E
- Country: Greece
- Administrative region: Central Macedonia
- Regional unit: Thessaloniki
- Municipality: Chalkidona
- Municipal unit: Agios Athanasios

Area
  - Community: 11.011 km^{2} (4.251 sq mi)
- Elevation: 25 m (82 ft)

Population (2021)
  - Community: 727
  - Density: 66.0/km^{2} (171/sq mi)
- Time zone: UTC+2 (EET)
  - Summer (DST): UTC+3 (EEST)
- Postal code: 570 11
- Area code: +30-231
- Vehicle registration: NA to NX

Anchialos (Greek: Αγχίαλος) is a village and a community of the Chalkidona municipality. Before the 2011 local government reform it was part of the municipality of Agios Athanasios, of which it was a municipal district. The 2021 census recorded 727 inhabitants in the community. The community of Anchialos covers an area of 11.011 km^{2}.

== See also ==
- List of settlements in the Thessaloniki regional unit
