= Anatoliko, Thessaloniki =

Anatoliko Ανατολικό
- Community
- Location within Greece
- Coordinates: 40°39.8′N 22°42.7′E
- Country: Greece
- Administrative region: Central Macedonia
- Regional unit: Thessaloniki
- Municipality: Delta
- Municipal unit: Chalastra

Area
  - Community: 22.966 km^{2} (8.867 sq mi)
- Elevation: 8 m (26 ft)

Population (2021)
  - Community: 2,409
  - Density: 104.9/km^{2} (271.7/sq mi)
- Time zone: UTC+2 (EET)
  - Summer (DST): UTC+3 (EEST)
- Postal code: 573 00
- Area code: +30-231
- Vehicle registration: NA to NX

Anatoliko (Greek: Ανατολικό) is a village and a community of the Delta municipality. Before the 2011 local government reform it was part of the municipality of Chalastra, of which it was a municipal district. The 2021 census recorded 2,409 inhabitants in the village. The community of Anatoliko covers an area of 22.966 km^{2}.

== See also ==
- List of settlements in the Thessaloniki regional unit
