= Eleousa (disambiguation) =

Eleousa or Eleusa may refer to:

- Eleusa icon, a type of icons of the Virgin Mary in the Eastern Orthodox Church
  - The Virgin Eleousa, a 15th-century icon of this type by Angelos Akotantos in Cleveland, Ohio, United States
- Eleousa, Ioannina, a village in the municipality of Zitsa, Ioannina regional unit, Greece
- Eleousa, Thessaloniki, a village in the municipality of Chalkidona, Thessaloniki regional unit, Greece
