= Agios Vasileios, Thessaloniki =

Agios Vasileios Άγιος Βασίλειος
- Community
- Location within Greece
- Coordinates: 40°39.9′N 23°6.8′E
- Country: Greece
- Administrative region: Central Macedonia
- Regional unit: Thessaloniki
- Municipality: Lagkadas
- Municipal unit: Koroneia

Area
  - Community: 28.271 km^{2} (10.915 sq mi)
- Elevation: 100 m (330 ft)

Population (2021)
  - Community: 1,180
  - Density: 41.7/km^{2} (108/sq mi)
- Time zone: UTC+2 (EET)
  - Summer (DST): UTC+3 (EEST)
- Postal code: 572 00
- Area code: +30-2394
- Vehicle registration: NA to NX

Agios Vasileios (Greek: Άγιος Βασίλειος) is a village and a community of the Lagkadas municipality in Greece. Before the local government reform of 2011, it was part of the municipality of Koroneia, of which it was a municipal district. The 2021 census recorded 1,180 inhabitants in the village. The community of Agios Vasileios covers an area of 28.271 km^{2}.

== See also ==
- List of settlements in the Thessaloniki regional unit
