= Xirochori =

Xirochori Ξηροχώρι
- Community
- Location within Greece
- Coordinates: 40°48′11″N 22°46′48″E
- Country: Greece
- Administrative region: Central Macedonia
- Regional unit: Thessaloniki
- Municipality: Chalkidona
- Municipal unit: Agios Athanasios
- Elevation: 116 m (381 ft)

Population (2021)
  - Community: 495
- Time zone: UTC+2 (EET)
  - Summer (DST): UTC+3 (EEST)
- Postal code: 570 11
- Area code: +30-231
- Vehicle registration: NA to NX

Xirochori (Greek: Ξηροχώρι, before 1926: Γιόρδινον - Giordinon, ) is a community and a village in the municipal unit of Agios Athanasios in the Thessaloniki regional unit, Greece. The community is 25 km north-northwest of downtown Thessaloniki.

The community consists of two villages: Xirochori and Baleika. According to the 2021 census, it has a total population of 495.
