= Irakleio, Thessaloniki =

Irakleio Ηράκλειο
- Community
- Location within Greece
- Coordinates: 40°45.4′N 23°2.2′E
- Country: Greece
- Administrative region: Central Macedonia
- Regional unit: Thessaloniki
- Municipality: Lagkadas
- Municipal unit: Lagkadas

Area
  - Community: 9.825 km^{2} (3.793 sq mi)
- Elevation: 105 m (344 ft)

Population (2021)
  - Community: 1,171
  - Density: 119.2/km^{2} (308.7/sq mi)
- Time zone: UTC+2 (EET)
  - Summer (DST): UTC+3 (EEST)
- Postal code: 572 00
- Area code: +30-2394
- Vehicle registration: NA to NX

Irakleio (Greek: Ηράκλειο) is a village and a community of the Lagkadas municipality. Before the 2011 local government reform it was part of the municipality of Lagkadas, of which it was a municipal district. The 2021 census recorded 1,171 inhabitants in the village. The community of Irakleio covers an area of 9.825 km^{2}.

== See also ==
- List of settlements in the Thessaloniki regional unit
