= Vathylakkos, Thessaloniki =

Vathylakkos Βαθύλακκος
- Community
- Location within Greece
- Coordinates: 40°46.2′N 22°42.5′E
- Country: Greece
- Administrative region: Central Macedonia
- Regional unit: Thessaloniki
- Municipality: Chalkidona
- Municipal unit: Agios Athanasios

Area
  - Community: 23.532 km^{2} (9.086 sq mi)
- Elevation: 110 m (360 ft)

Population (2021)
  - Community: 2,002
  - Density: 85.08/km^{2} (220.3/sq mi)
- Time zone: UTC+2 (EET)
  - Summer (DST): UTC+3 (EEST)
- Postal code: 570 11
- Area code: +30-231
- Vehicle registration: NA to NX

Vathylakkos (Greek: Βαθύλακκος, previously Vatiluk and Kadikjöј) is a village and a community of the Chalkidona municipality. Before the 2011 local government reform it was part of the municipality of Agios Athanasios, of which it was a municipal district. The 2021 census recorded 2,002 inhabitants in the community. The community of Vathylakkos covers an area of 23.532 km^{2}.

== See also ==
- List of settlements in the Thessaloniki regional unit
