= Neo Rysio =

Neo Rysio Νέο Ρύσιο
- Community
- Location within Greece
- Coordinates: 40°29.7′N 22°59.3′E
- Country: Greece
- Administrative region: Central Macedonia
- Regional unit: Thessaloniki
- Municipality: Thermi
- Municipal unit: Thermi

Area
  - Community: 15.068 km^{2} (5.818 sq mi)
- Elevation: 60 m (200 ft)

Population (2021)
  - Community: 2,845
  - Density: 188.8/km^{2} (489.0/sq mi)
- Time zone: UTC+2 (EET)
  - Summer (DST): UTC+3 (EEST)
- Postal code: 570 00
- Area code: +30-2392
- Vehicle registration: NA to NX

Neo Rysio (Greek: Νέο Ρύσιο) is a village and a community of the Thermi municipality. Before the 2011 local government reform it was part of the municipality of Thermi, of which it was a municipal district. The 2021 census recorded 2,845 inhabitants in the village. The community of Neo Rysio covers an area of 15.068 km^{2}.

== See also ==
- List of settlements in the Thessaloniki regional unit
