= Lakkia, Thessaloniki =

Lakkia Λακκιά
- Settlement
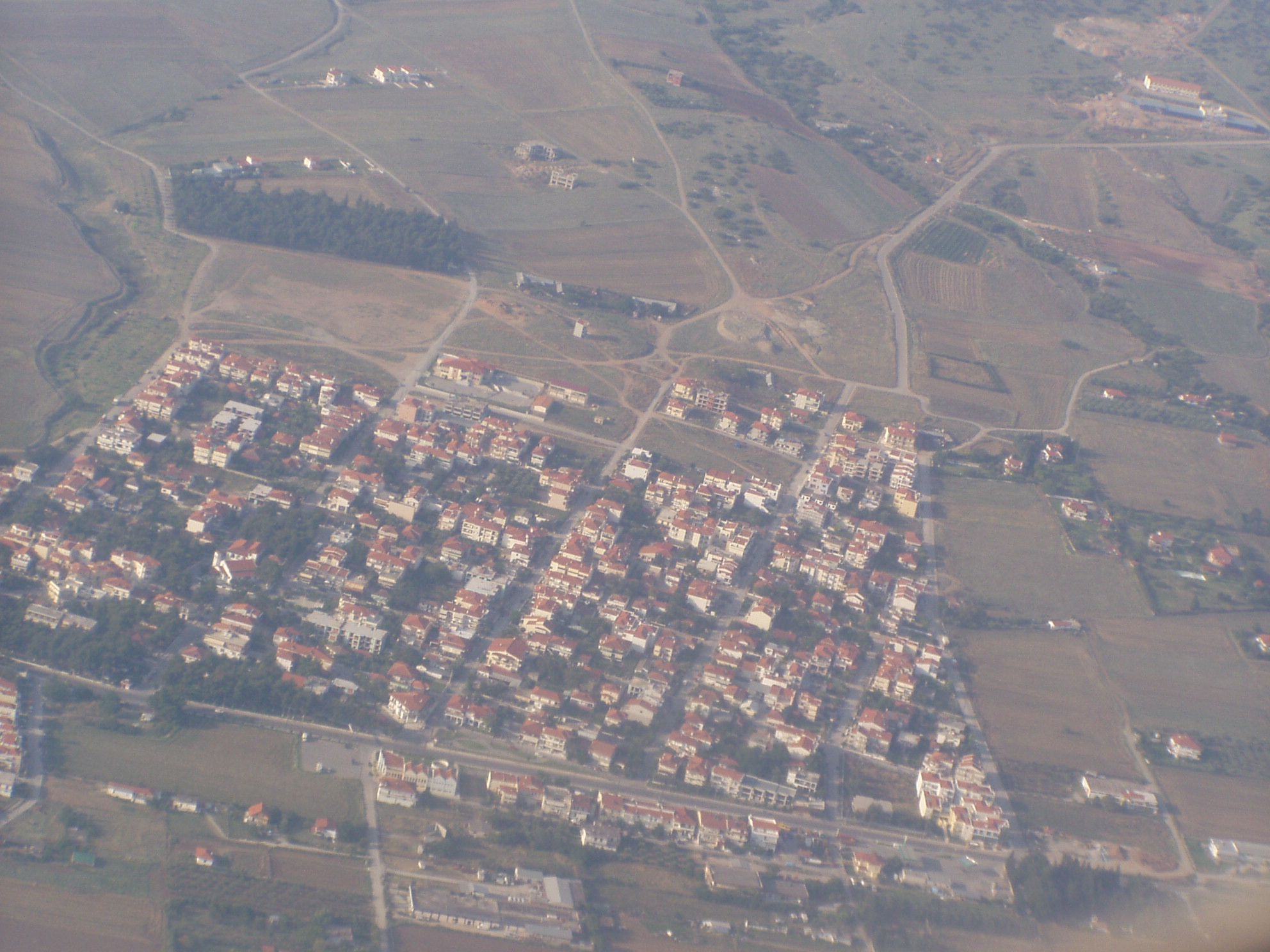

- Location within Greece
- Coordinates: 40°30.9′N 23°6.6′E
- Country: Greece
- Administrative region: Central Macedonia
- Regional unit: Thessaloniki
- Municipality: Thermi
- Municipal unit: Vasilika
- Community: Vasilika
- Elevation: 110 m (360 ft)

Population (2021)
  - Total: 398
- Time zone: UTC+2 (EET)
  - Summer (DST): UTC+3 (EEST)
- Postal code: 570 06
- Area code: +30-2396
- Vehicle registration: NA to NX

Lakkia (Greek: Λακκιά) is a village of the Thermi municipality, northern Greece. The 2021 census recorded 398 inhabitants in the village. Lakkia is a part of the community of Vasilika.

== See also ==
- List of settlements in the Thessaloniki regional unit
