= Sindos =

Suburb of Thessaloniki, Greece

Sindos Σίνδος
- Community
- Location within Greece
- Coordinates: 40°40′N 22°48′E
- Country: Greece
- Administrative region: Central Macedonia
- Regional unit: Thessaloniki
- Municipality: Delta
- Municipal unit: Echedoros

Area
  - Community: 47.248 km^{2} (18.243 sq mi)
- Elevation: 10 m (33 ft)

Population (2021)
  - Community: 9,406
  - Density: 199.1/km^{2} (515.6/sq mi)
- Time zone: UTC+2 (EET)
  - Summer (DST): UTC+3 (EEST)

Sindos (Greek: Σίνδος; Latin: Sindus) is a suburb of Thessaloniki, Greece. It is the seat of the municipality of Delta. Sindos is home to the main campus of the International Hellenic University and the Industrial Zone of the city. The community Sindos has an area of 47.248 km^{2}. The population was 9,406 at the 2021 census.

== History ==
In antiquity, Sindos was noted by Herodotus (vii. 123); and Stephanus of Byzantium as a maritime town of Mygdonia in Macedonia, between Therme and Chalastra.

== Transport ==
The settlement is severed by Sindos railway station, on the Piraeus–Platy railway and Thessaloniki–Bitola railway. Sindos - Thessaloniki transportation is facilitated by the lines 52, 80 and 51 of OASTH bus, where the central railway station serves as starting point.
