= Eleousa, Thessaloniki =

Eleousa Ελεούσα
- Community
- Location within Greece
- Coordinates: 40°44.9′N 22°37.6′E
- Country: Greece
- Administrative region: Central Macedonia
- Regional unit: Thessaloniki
- Municipality: Chalkidona
- Municipal unit: Chalkidona

Area
  - Community: 10.391 km^{2} (4.012 sq mi)
- Elevation: 14 m (46 ft)

Population (2021)
  - Community: 363
  - Density: 34.9/km^{2} (90.5/sq mi)
- Time zone: UTC+2 (EET)
  - Summer (DST): UTC+3 (EEST)
- Postal code: 570 07
- Area code: +30-2391
- Vehicle registration: NA to NX

Eleousa (Greek: Ελεούσα) is a village and a community of the Chalkidona municipality. Before the 2011 local government reform it was part of the municipality of Chalkidona, of which it was a municipal district. The 2021 census recorded 363 inhabitants in the community. The community of Eleousa covers an area of 10.391 km^{2}.

== See also ==
- List of settlements in the Thessaloniki regional unit
