= Nea Kerasia =

Nea Kerasia Νέα Κερασιά
- Community
- Location within Greece
- Coordinates: 40°28.5′N 22°52.1′E
- Country: Greece
- Administrative region: Central Macedonia
- Regional unit: Thessaloniki
- Municipality: Thermaikos
- Municipal unit: Michaniona

Area
  - Community: 4.70 km^{2} (1.81 sq mi)
- Elevation: 20 m (66 ft)

Population (2021)
  - Community: 1,864
  - Density: 397/km^{2} (1,030/sq mi)
- Time zone: UTC+2 (EET)
  - Summer (DST): UTC+3 (EEST)
- Postal code: 570 04
- Area code: +30-2392
- Vehicle registration: NA to NX

Nea Kerasia (Greek: Νέα Κερασιά) is a village and a community of the Thermaikos municipality. Before the 2011 local government reform it was part of the municipality of Michaniona, of which it was a municipal district. The 2021 census recorded 1,864 inhabitants in the village. The community of Nea Kerasia covers an area of 4.70 km^{2}.

== See also ==
- List of settlements in the Thessaloniki regional unit
