= Melissourgos =

Village in Central Macedonia, Greece

Melissourgos Μελισσουργός
- Community
- Location within Greece
- Coordinates: 40°35.9′N 23°28.5′E
- Country: Greece
- Administrative region: Central Macedonia
- Regional unit: Thessaloniki
- Municipality: Volvi
- Municipal unit: Apollonia

Area
  - Community: 22.908 km^{2} (8.845 sq mi)
- Elevation: 100 m (330 ft)

Population (2021)
  - Community: 318
  - Density: 13.9/km^{2} (36.0/sq mi)
- Time zone: UTC+2 (EET)
  - Summer (DST): UTC+3 (EEST)
- Postal code: 570 12
- Area code: +30-2393
- Vehicle registration: NA to NX

Melissourgos (Greek: Μελισσουργός) is a village and a community of the Volvi municipality. Before the 2011 local government reform it was part of the municipality of Apollonia, of which it was a municipal district. The 2021 census recorded 318 inhabitants in the village. The community of Melissourgos covers an area of 22.908 km^{2}.

According to the statistics of Vasil Kanchov ("Macedonia, Ethnography and Statistics"), 160 Greek Christians and 136 Turks lived in the village in 1900.

== See also ==
- List of settlements in the Thessaloniki regional unit
