= Mavrouda =

Village in Central Macedonia, Greece

Mavrouda Μαυρούδα
- Community
- Location within Greece
- Coordinates: 40°48.3′N 23°28′E
- Country: Greece
- Administrative region: Central Macedonia
- Regional unit: Thessaloniki
- Municipality: Volvi
- Municipal unit: Arethousa

Area
  - Community: 23.125 km^{2} (8.929 sq mi)
- Elevation: 360 m (1,180 ft)

Population (2021)
  - Community: 237
  - Density: 10.2/km^{2} (26.5/sq mi)
- Time zone: UTC+2 (EET)
  - Summer (DST): UTC+3 (EEST)
- Postal code: 570 02
- Area code: +30-2395
- Vehicle registration: NA to NX

Mavrouda (Greek: Μαυρούδα) is a village and a community of the Volvi municipality. Before the 2011 local government reform it was part of the municipality of Arethousa, of which it was a municipal district. The 2021 census recorded 237 inhabitants in the village. The community of Mavrouda covers an area of 23.125 km^{2}.

== See also ==
- List of settlements in the Thessaloniki regional unit
