= Askos, Sochos =

Askos Ασκός
- Community
- Location within Greece
- Coordinates: 40°45′N 23°23′E
- Country: Greece
- Administrative region: Central Macedonia
- Regional unit: Thessaloniki
- Municipality: Langadas
- Elevation: 460 m (1,510 ft)

Population (2021)
  - Community: 1,014
- Time zone: UTC+2 (EET)
  - Summer (DST): UTC+3 (EEST)
- Postal code: 570 16
- Area code: 23950

Askos (Greek: Ασκός) is a small mountain village in northern Greece, part of the municipality Lagkadas. It is located approximately 60 kilometers from Thessaloniki.

The village is also known for the carnival of Sochos that is organized every year to advertise the wines and cheese that it produces. There is also the historical mountain Tempelis in Askos.

The football team of Askos is Makedonikos and its colours are green and white.
