= Modi, Thessaloniki =

Village in Central Macedonia, Greece

Modi Μόδι
- Community
- Location within Greece
- Coordinates: 40°37.6′N 23°36.6′E
- Country: Greece
- Administrative region: Central Macedonia
- Regional unit: Thessaloniki
- Municipality: Volvi
- Municipal unit: Madytos

Area
  - Community: 22.504 km^{2} (8.689 sq mi)
- Elevation: 130 m (430 ft)

Population (2021)
  - Community: 326
  - Density: 14.5/km^{2} (37.5/sq mi)
- Time zone: UTC+2 (EET)
  - Summer (DST): UTC+3 (EEST)
- Postal code: 570 14
- Area code: +30-2397
- Vehicle registration: NA to NX

Modi (Greek: Μόδι) is a village and a community of the Volvi municipality. Before the 2011 local government reform it was part of the municipality of Madytos, of which it was a municipal district and the seat. The 2021 census recorded 326 inhabitants in the village. The community of Modi covers an area of 22.504 km^{2}.

== See also ==
- List of settlements in the Thessaloniki regional unit
