= Pinewood - The American International School =

American school in Thermi, Greece

Coordinates: 40.5288°N 23.0123°E

Information
- School type: International school
- Grades: Pre-Kindergarten - Grade 12
- Language: English
- Website: www.pinewood.gr

Pinewood - The American International School is an American international school in Thermi, Thessaloniki regional unit, Greece. It serves grades Pre-Kindergarten through 12 and uses English as its language of instruction.
