= Exochi, Thessaloniki =

Exochi Εξοχή
- Community
- Location within Greece
- Coordinates: 40°37.7′N 23°2.6′E
- Country: Greece
- Administrative region: Central Macedonia
- Regional unit: Thessaloniki
- Municipality: Pylaia-Chortiatis
- Municipal unit: Chortiatis

Area
  - Community: 2.575 km^{2} (0.994 sq mi)
- Elevation: 470 m (1,540 ft)

Population (2021)
  - Community: 1,265
  - Density: 491.3/km^{2} (1,272/sq mi)
- Time zone: UTC+2 (EET)
  - Summer (DST): UTC+3 (EEST)
- Postal code: 570 10
- Area code: +30-231
- Vehicle registration: NA to NX

Exochi (Greek: Εξοχή) is a village and a community of the Pylaia-Chortiatis municipality. Before the 2011 local government reform it was part of the municipality of Chortiatis, of which it was a municipal district. The 2021 census recorded 1,265 inhabitants in the community. The community of Exochi covers an area of 2.575 km^{2}.

== See also ==
- List of settlements in the Thessaloniki regional unit
