= Ano Stavros =

Ano Stavros Άνω Σταυρός
- Community
- Location within Greece
- Coordinates: 40°39.3′N 23°41.92′E
- Country: Greece
- Administrative region: Central Macedonia
- Regional unit: Thessaloniki
- Municipality: Volvi
- Municipal unit: Rentina

Area
  - Community: 19.50 km^{2} (7.53 sq mi)
- Elevation: 80 m (260 ft)

Population (2021)
  - Community: 768
  - Density: 39.4/km^{2} (102/sq mi)
- Time zone: UTC+2 (EET)
  - Summer (DST): UTC+3 (EEST)
- Postal code: 570 14
- Area code: +30-2397
- Vehicle registration: NA to NX

Ano Stavros (Greek: Άνω Σταυρός) is a village and a community of the Volvi municipality. Before the 2011 local government reform it was part of the municipality of Egnatia, of which it was a municipal district. The 2021 census recorded 768 inhabitants in the village. The community of Ano Stavros covers an area of 19.50 km^{2}.

== See also ==
- List of settlements in the Thessaloniki regional unit
