= Axios, Thessaloniki =

Axios Αξιός
- Municipal unit
- Location within the regional unit

- Location within Greece
- Coordinates: 40°37′N 22°41′E
- Country: Greece
- Administrative region: Central Macedonia
- Regional unit: Thessaloniki
- Municipality: Delta

Area
  - Municipal unit: 86.532 km^{2} (33.410 sq mi)

Population (2021)
  - Municipal unit: 5,873
  - Municipal unit density: 67.87/km^{2} (175.8/sq mi)
- Time zone: UTC+2 (EET)
  - Summer (DST): UTC+3 (EEST)
- Postal code: 576 00
- Area code: +30-2391
- Vehicle registration: NA to NX

Axios (Greek: Αξιός) is a municipal unit of Delta, a municipality in the Thessaloniki regional unit, Greece. Before the 2011 local government reform, Axios was an independent municipality. The seat of the municipality was the town Kymina. The 2021 census recorded 5,873 inhabitants in the municipal unit. Axios covers an area of 86.532 km^{2}.

== See also ==
- List of settlements in the Thessaloniki regional unit
