= Stivos =

Village in Central Macedonia, Greece

Stivos Στίβος
- Community
- Location within Greece
- Coordinates: 40°39′N 23°18.2′E
- Country: Greece
- Administrative region: Central Macedonia
- Regional unit: Thessaloniki
- Municipality: Volvi
- Municipal unit: Apollonia

Area
  - Community: 11.397 km^{2} (4.400 sq mi)
- Elevation: 160 m (520 ft)

Population (2021)
  - Community: 502
  - Density: 44.0/km^{2} (114/sq mi)
- Time zone: UTC+2 (EET)
  - Summer (DST): UTC+3 (EEST)
- Postal code: 570 20
- Area code: +30-2393
- Vehicle registration: NA to NX

Stivos (Greek: Στίβος) is a village and a community of the Volvi municipality. Before the 2011 local government reform it was part of the municipality of Apollonia, of which it was a municipal district. The 2021 census recorded 502 inhabitants in the village. The community of Stivos covers an area of 11.397 km^{2}.

== See also ==
- List of settlements in the Thessaloniki regional unit
