= Scholari =

Scholari Σχολάρι
- Community
- Location within Greece
- Coordinates: 40°40.3′N 23°15.2′E
- Country: Greece
- Administrative region: Central Macedonia
- Regional unit: Thessaloniki
- Municipality: Volvi
- Municipal unit: Egnatia

Area
  - Community: 16.217 km^{2} (6.261 sq mi)
- Elevation: 95 m (312 ft)

Population (2021)
  - Community: 389
  - Density: 24.0/km^{2} (62.1/sq mi)
- Time zone: UTC+2 (EET)
  - Summer (DST): UTC+3 (EEST)
- Postal code: 572 00
- Area code: +30-2393
- Vehicle registration: NAx to NX

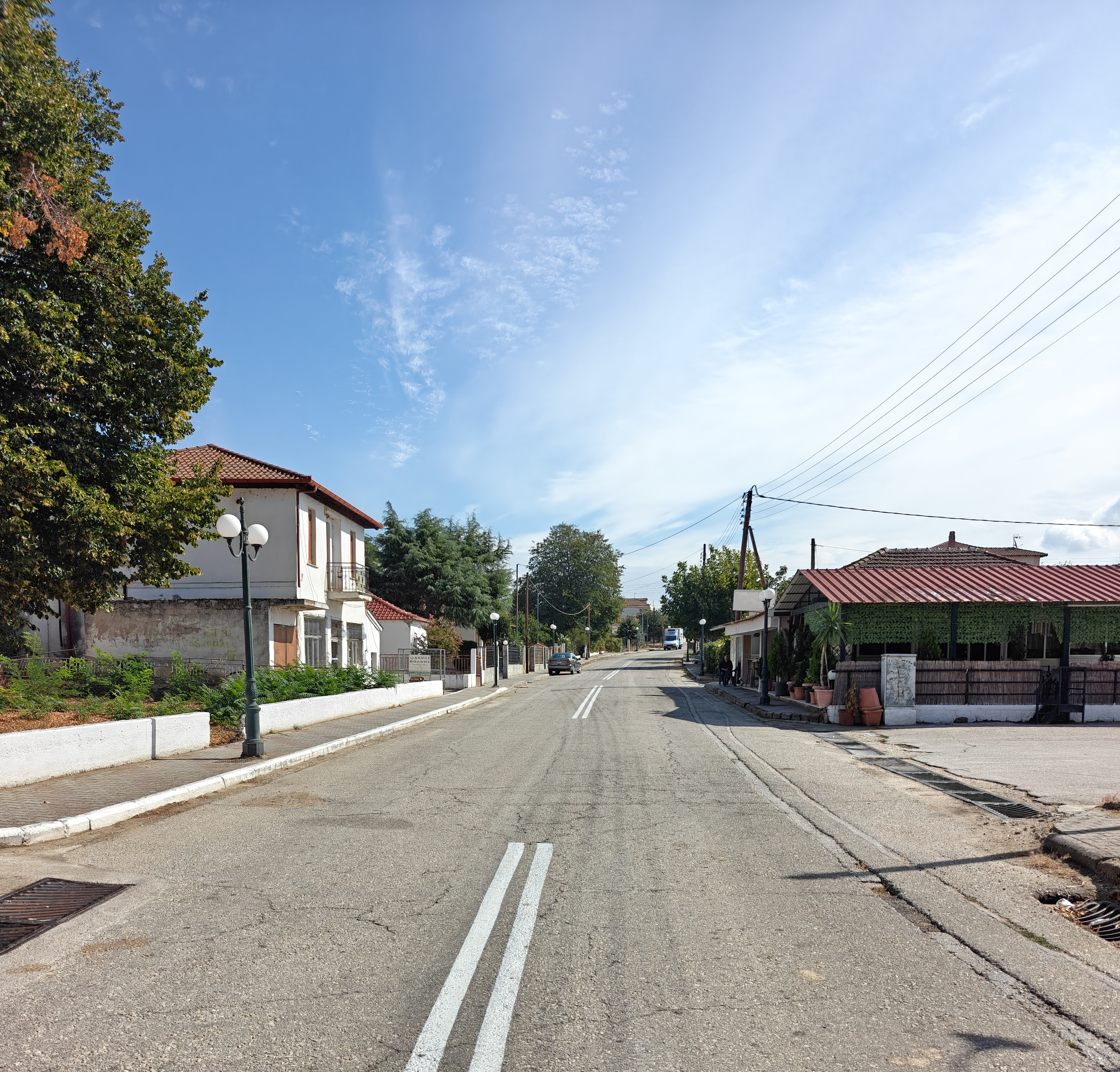

Scholari (Greek: Σχολάρι) is a village and a community of the Volvi municipality. Before the 2011 local government reform it was part of the municipality of Egnatia, of which it was a municipal district. The 2021 census recorded 389 inhabitants in the village. The community of Scholari covers an area of 16.217 km^{2}.

== See also ==
- List of settlements in the Thessaloniki regional unit
