= Chalastra =

Chalastra Χαλάστρα
- Municipal unit
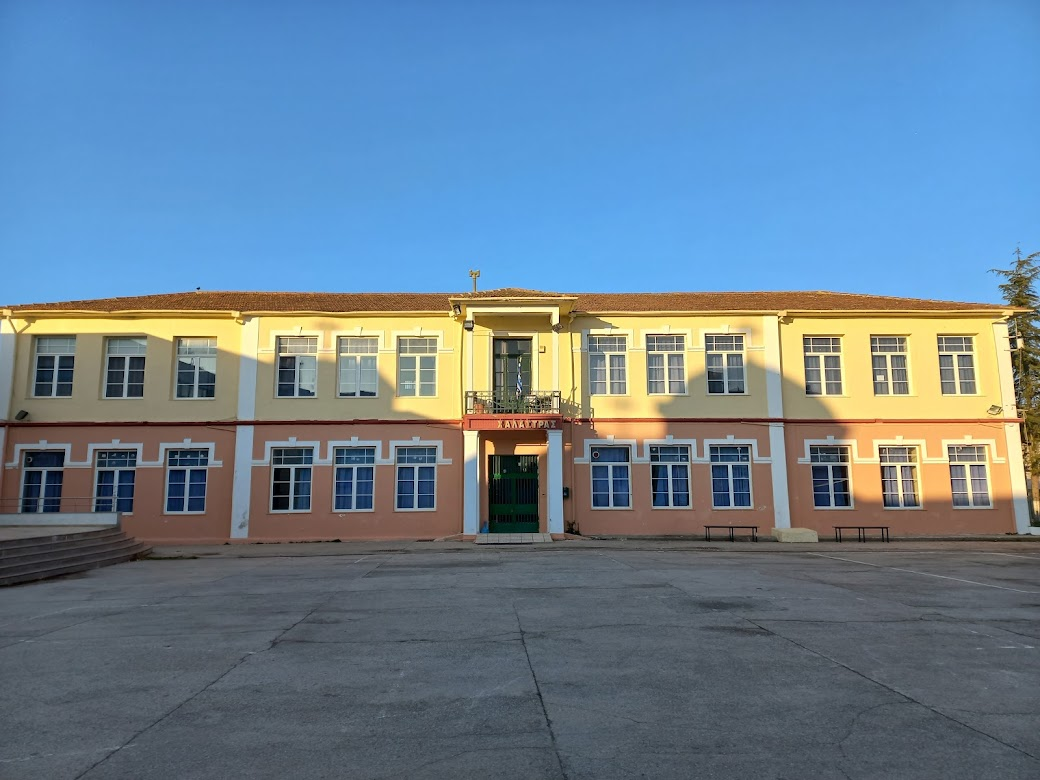

- Location within the regional unit

- Location within Greece
- Coordinates: 40°38′N 22°44′E
- Country: Greece
- Administrative region: Central Macedonia
- Regional unit: Thessaloniki
- Municipality: Delta

Area
  - Municipal unit: 121.415 km^{2} (46.879 sq mi)
  - Community: 98.449 km^{2} (38.011 sq mi)

Population (2021)
  - Municipal unit: 9,066
  - Municipal unit density: 74.67/km^{2} (193.4/sq mi)
  - Community: 6,657
  - Community density: 67.62/km^{2} (175.1/sq mi)
- Time zone: UTC+2 (EET)
  - Summer (DST): UTC+3 (EEST)

Chalastra (Greek: Χαλάστρα) is a town and former municipality in the Thessaloniki regional unit, Greece. Before 1926, it was known as Κουλουκιά - Kouloukia (Bulgarian: Кулакия - Kulakiya). It was renamed to Chalastra in 1926, to Πύργος - Pyrgos in 1955 and back to Chalastra in 1980. Since the local government reform of 2011 it has been part of the municipality Delta, of which it is a municipal unit. The town is located 20 km west from the city of Thessaloniki, on the north side of Greek National Road 1, near the Axios river and the Thermaic Gulf. The municipal unit of Chalastra consists of the two communities of Chalastra itself and Anatoliko. The population was 9,066 inhabitants according to the 2021 census, most of them working in agriculture and small industry. The municipal unit Chalastra has an area of 121.415 km^{2}, and the community Chalastra has an area of 98.449 km^{2}.

== History ==
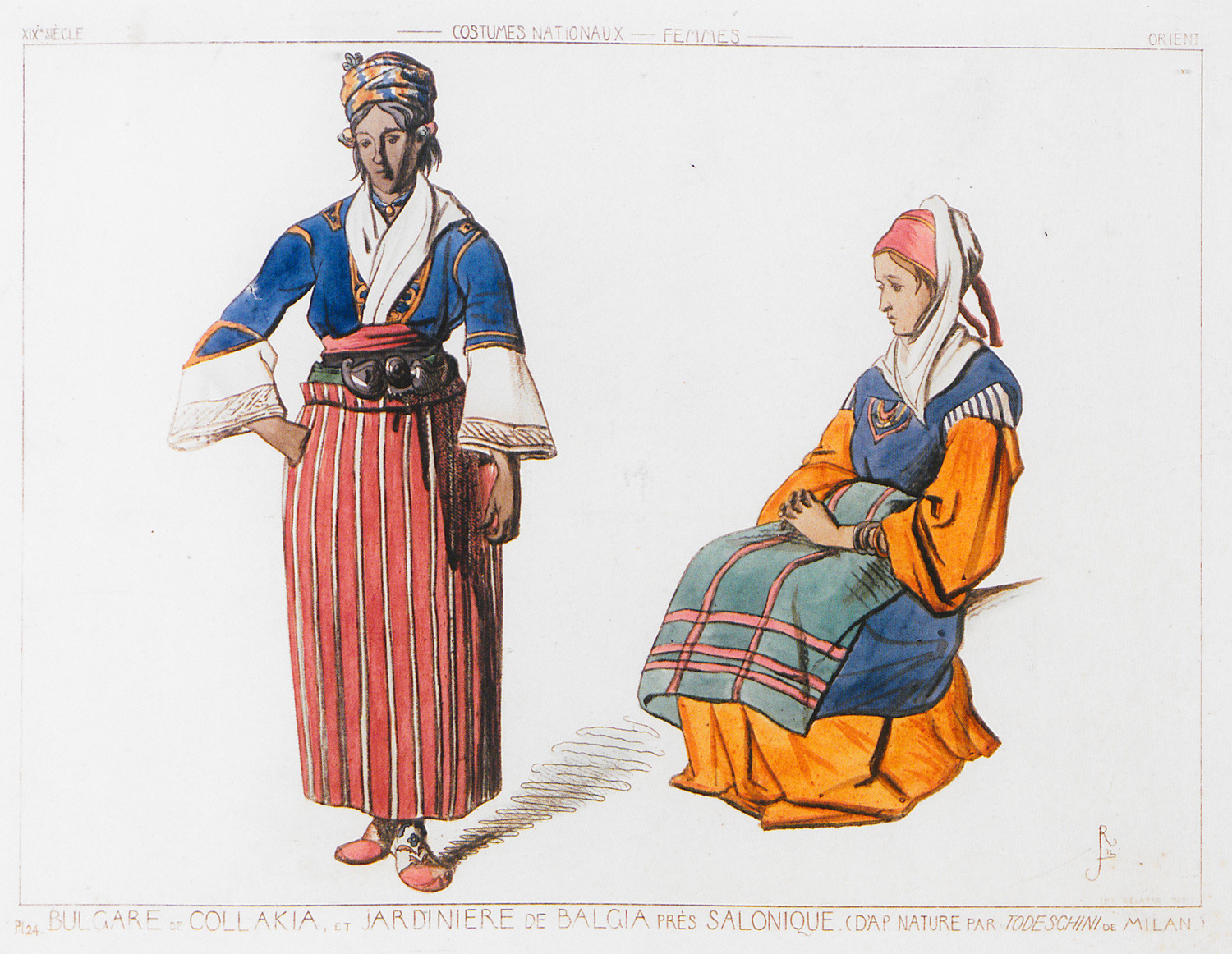
A Bulgarian woman from Chalastra/Kulakia (left) by Raphäel Jacquemin, 19th century

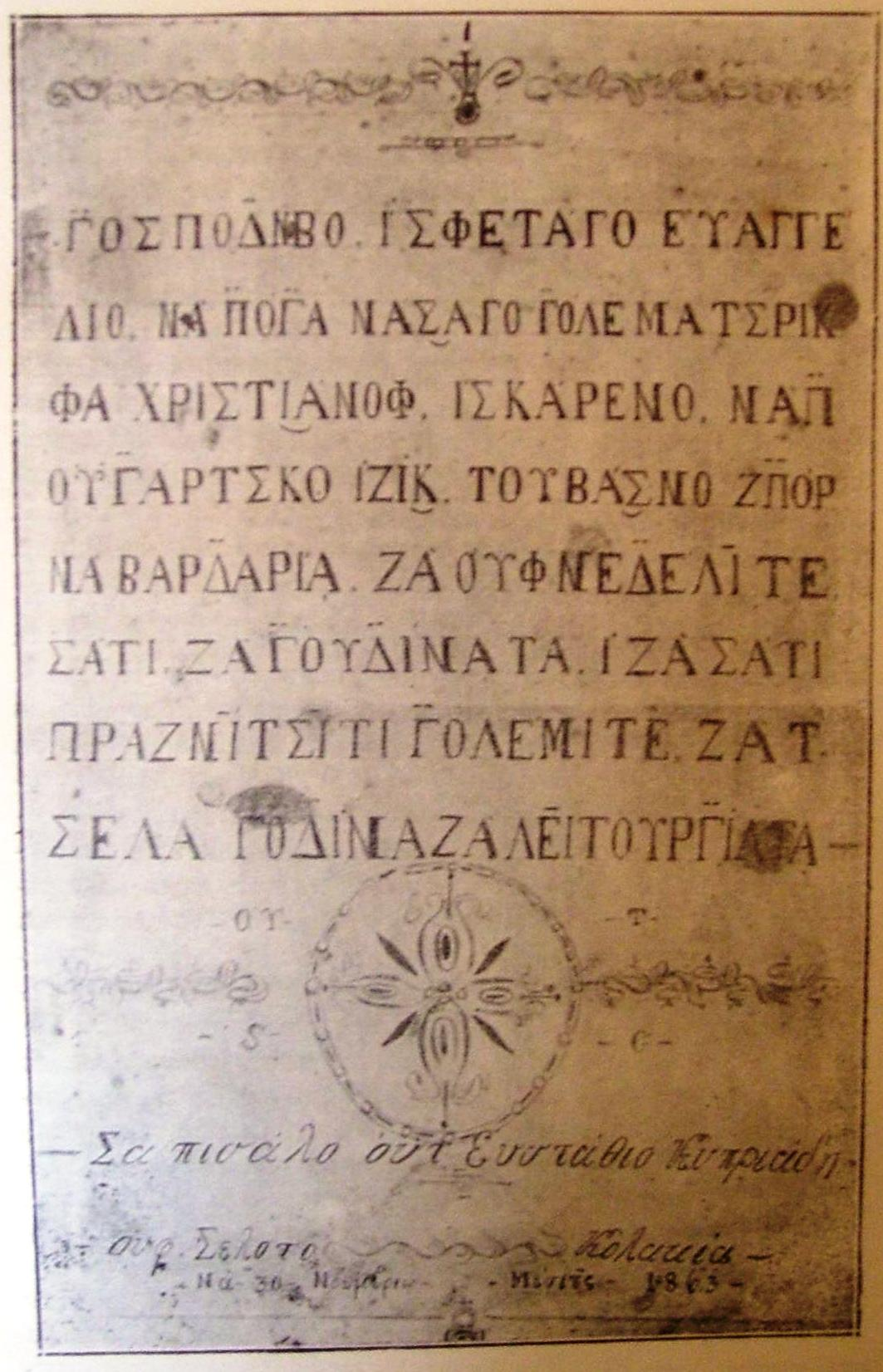
The Kulakia Gospel, a Bible written in the native Slavic dialect of Chalastra in 1863 with the Greek alphabet. On the title page there is also inscription "written in Bulgarian language".

Chalastra (Ancient Greek: Χαλάστρα, Strabo vii.; Χαλέστρη, Herod. vii. 123; Χαλαίστρα, Plut. Alex. 49; Plin. iv. 10. § 17, xxxi. 10. § 46) was known as a town of Mygdonia in ancient Macedonia, situated on the Thermaikos gulf at the mouth of the Axios river, which belonged to the Thracians and possessed a harbor. A large part of the population was absorbed in Thessaloniki when it was founded by Cassander.

The site of the ancient town is tentatively placed at Anchialos at 40°37′52″N 22°43′47″E.

During the Byzantine Middle Ages, the name of the area was "Campania".

In the 19th century it was inhabited by a mixed Bulgarian and Greek-speaking population.
