= Echedoros =

Echedoros Εχέδωρος
- Municipal unit
- Location within the regional unit

- Location within Greece
- Coordinates: 40°40′N 22°49′E
- Country: Greece
- Administrative region: Central Macedonia
- Regional unit: Thessaloniki
- Municipality: Delta

Area
  - Municipal unit: 103.147 km^{2} (39.825 sq mi)

Population (2021)
  - Municipal unit: 29,996
  - Municipal unit density: 290.81/km^{2} (753.19/sq mi)
- Time zone: UTC+2 (EET)
  - Summer (DST): UTC+3 (EEST)
- Postal code: 570 08, 574 00, 575 00
- Area code: +30-231
- Vehicle registration: NA to NX

Echedoros (Greek: Εχέδωρος) is a former municipality in the Thessaloniki regional unit, Greece. The seat of the municipality was in Sindos. Since the 2011 local government reform it is part of the municipality Delta, of which it is a municipal unit. The 2021 census recorded 29,996 inhabitants in the municipal unit. The municipal unit of Echedoros covers an area of 103.147 km^{2}. In antiquity Echedorus was a river rising in the mountains of Grestonia and falling into the Thermaic Gulf at Sindus.
