= Mikra, Thessaloniki =

Mikra Μίκρα
- Municipal unit
- Location within the regional unit

- Location within Greece
- Coordinates: 40°28′N 22°59′E
- Country: Greece
- Administrative region: Central Macedonia
- Regional unit: Thessaloniki
- Municipality: Thermi

Area
  - Municipal unit: 80.827 km^{2} (31.207 sq mi)
- Elevation: 157 m (515 ft)

Population (2021)
  - Municipal unit: 17,150
  - Municipal unit density: 212.2/km^{2} (549.5/sq mi)
- Time zone: UTC+2 (EET)
  - Summer (DST): UTC+3 (EEST)
- Website: Municipality of Mikra

Mikra (Greek: Μίκρα, Míkra) is a former municipality in the Thessaloniki regional unit, Greece. Since the 2011 local government reform it is part of the municipality Thermi, of which it is a municipal unit. Population 17,150 (2021). The seat of the municipality was in Trilofo. The municipal unit has an area of 80.827 km^{2}.
