= Agios Athanasios, Thessaloniki =

Agios Athanasios Άγιος Αθανάσιος
- Municipal unit
- Location within the regional unit

- Location within Greece
- Coordinates: 40°43′N 22°44′E
- Country: Greece
- Geographic region: Macedonia
- Administrative region: Central Macedonia
- Regional unit: Thessaloniki
- Municipality: Chalkidona

Area
  - Municipal unit: 155.3 km^{2} (60.0 sq mi)
  - Community: 35.53 km^{2} (13.72 sq mi)

Population (2021)
  - Municipal unit: 13,026
  - Municipal unit density: 83.88/km^{2} (217.2/sq mi)
  - Community: 4,717
  - Community density: 132.8/km^{2} (343.8/sq mi)
- Time zone: UTC+2 (EET)
  - Summer (DST): UTC+3 (EEST)
- Postal code: 57003

Agios Athanasios (Greek: Άγιος Αθανάσιος) is a town and a former municipality in the Thessaloniki regional unit, Macedonia, Greece. Since the 2011 local government reform it is part of the Chalkidona Municipality, of which it is a municipal unit. In 2021 the population was 13,026. The municipal unit of Agios Athanasios has an area of 155.34 km^{2}, and the community of Agios Athanasios has an area of 35.527 km^{2}.

== Geography ==
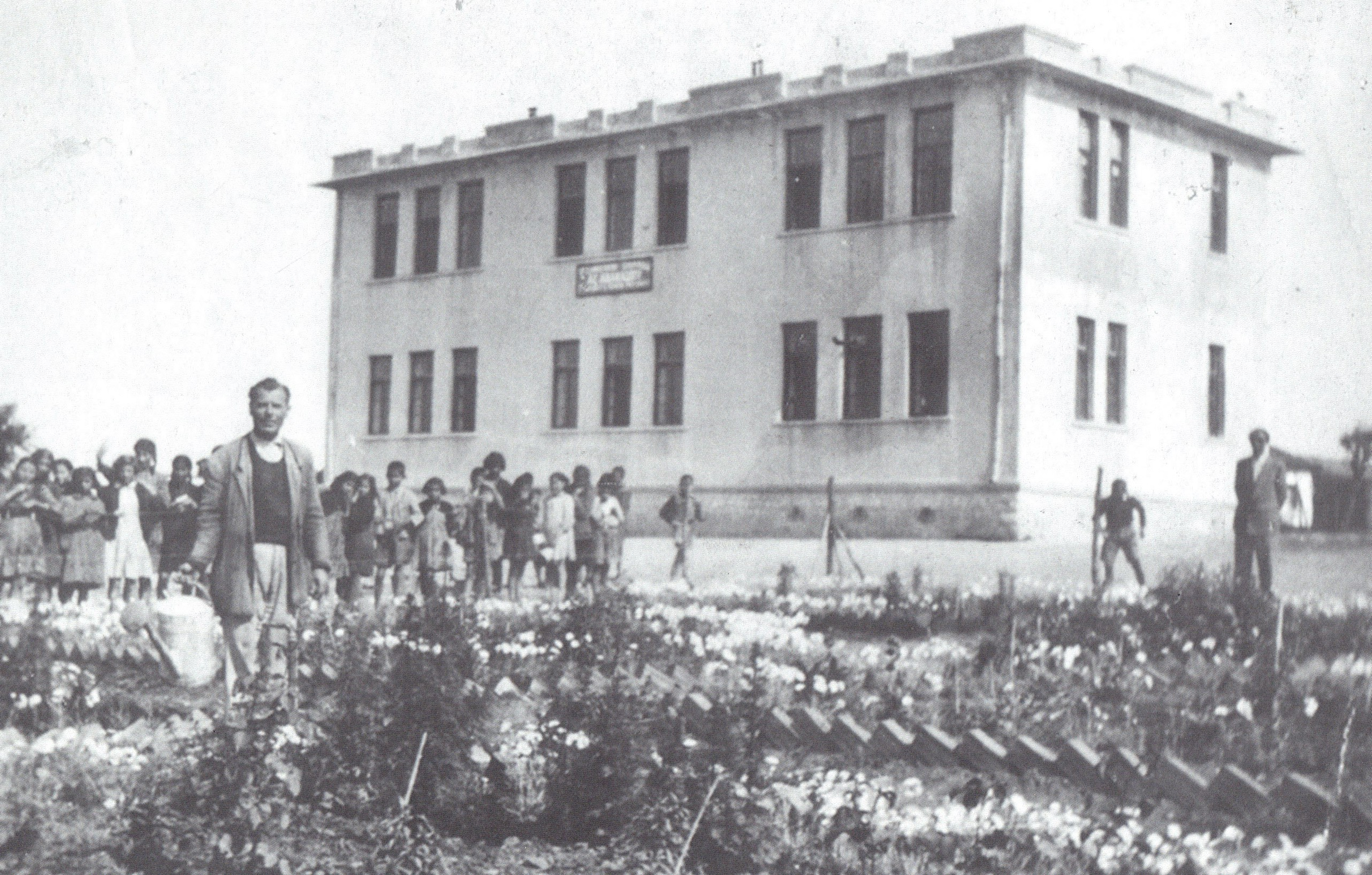
1st elementary school as it was 50 years ago

Agios Athanasios is a small town in Central Macedonia. It is situated 20 km west of Thessaloniki, on the old national road from Thessaloniki to Athens. According to the general population census 2011, the population of Agios Athanasios is 4,932 and the total population of the former Municipality of Agios Athanasios is 14,683. Agios Athanasios is the biggest Greek refugee town in the Thessaloniki regional unit. It is built on the old national road that linked, in the past, Thessaloniki to the Western Macedonia and to the Southern Greece.

== History ==
The modern town was founded by refugees from 25 villages of Eastern Thrace and 7 villages of Asia Minor, the region of Smyrna. The refugees moved in Agios Athanasios from October 1922 till 1924. The first refugees settled in the manoir (chiflik) Kavakli in October 1922. The first 25 families came from Kermeni in Eastern Thrace. Apart from the manoir Kavakli, there were also the manoirs Paliocopi, Tsalkato, Kouloupantza and Tsalikovo in the area. Around 1850, the tenant farmers built the small church of Saint George, which is the oldest building of the town. The first refugees were settled in the few poorly built houses, in the storing places and the stables of the chiflik Kavakli. Till the autumn of 1924 about 600 families, that is about 2,800 inhabitants, settled in. The first name of the town was Perintos, after the ancient town in the Eastern Thrace. In 1928 the town was given the name of Agios Athanasios. The people were farmers and stock breeders and they never forgot the customs of their homeland. Today, Agios Athanasios is a modern, nicely developed town with three nursery schools, two primary schools, a junior high school, a high school and a vocational high school.

== Macedonian tombs ==
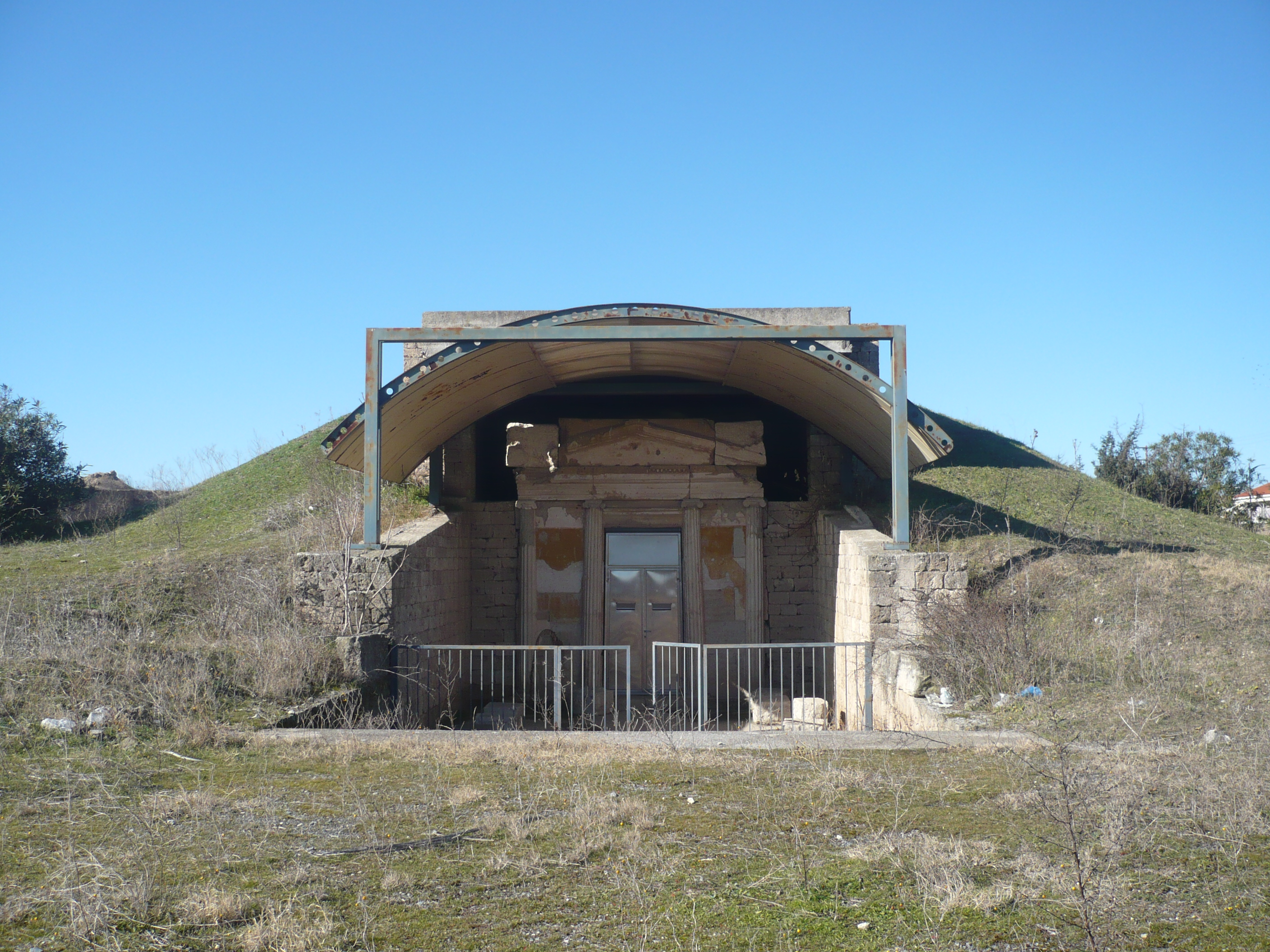
View of a tomb

In 1994, two small ancient Macedonians tombs were discovered, dated to 4th century BC.

== Gallery ==
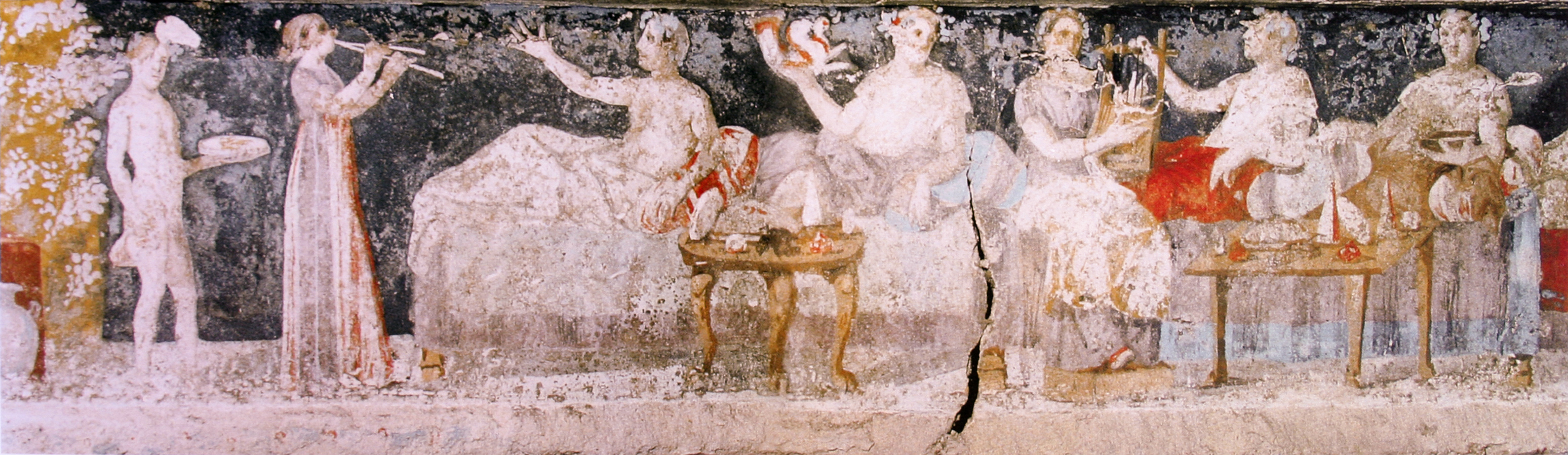
Banquet scene from a tomb

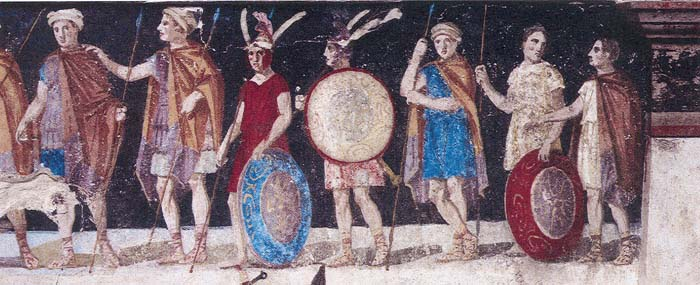
Fresco of Macedonian soldiers

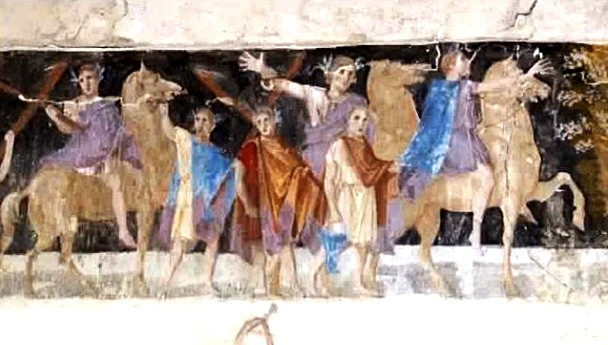
Fresco of Macedonian soldiers

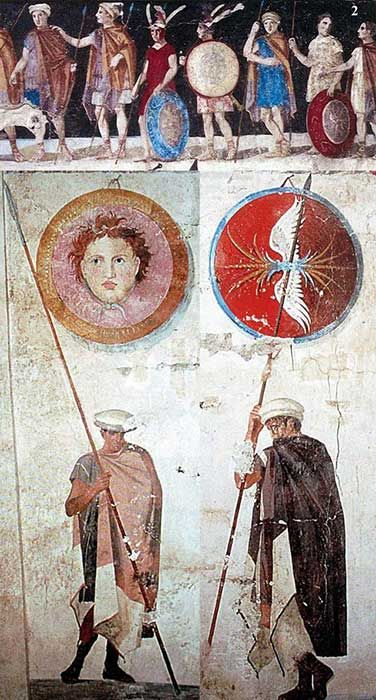
Paintings of ancient Macedonian soldiers, shields and sarissas
