= Delta, Thessaloniki =

Delta Δέλτα
- Municipality
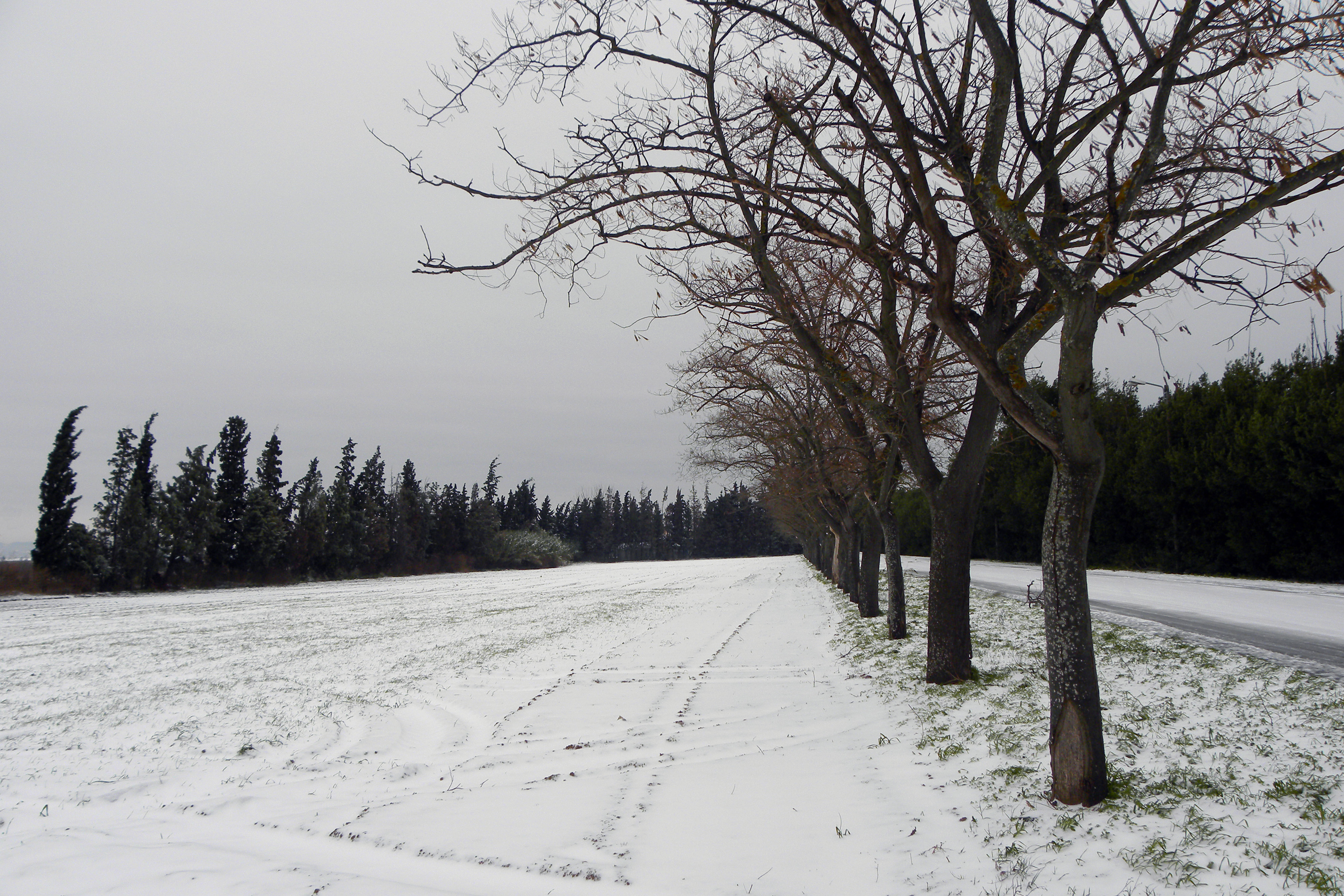
- View of a snowy landscape near Sindos

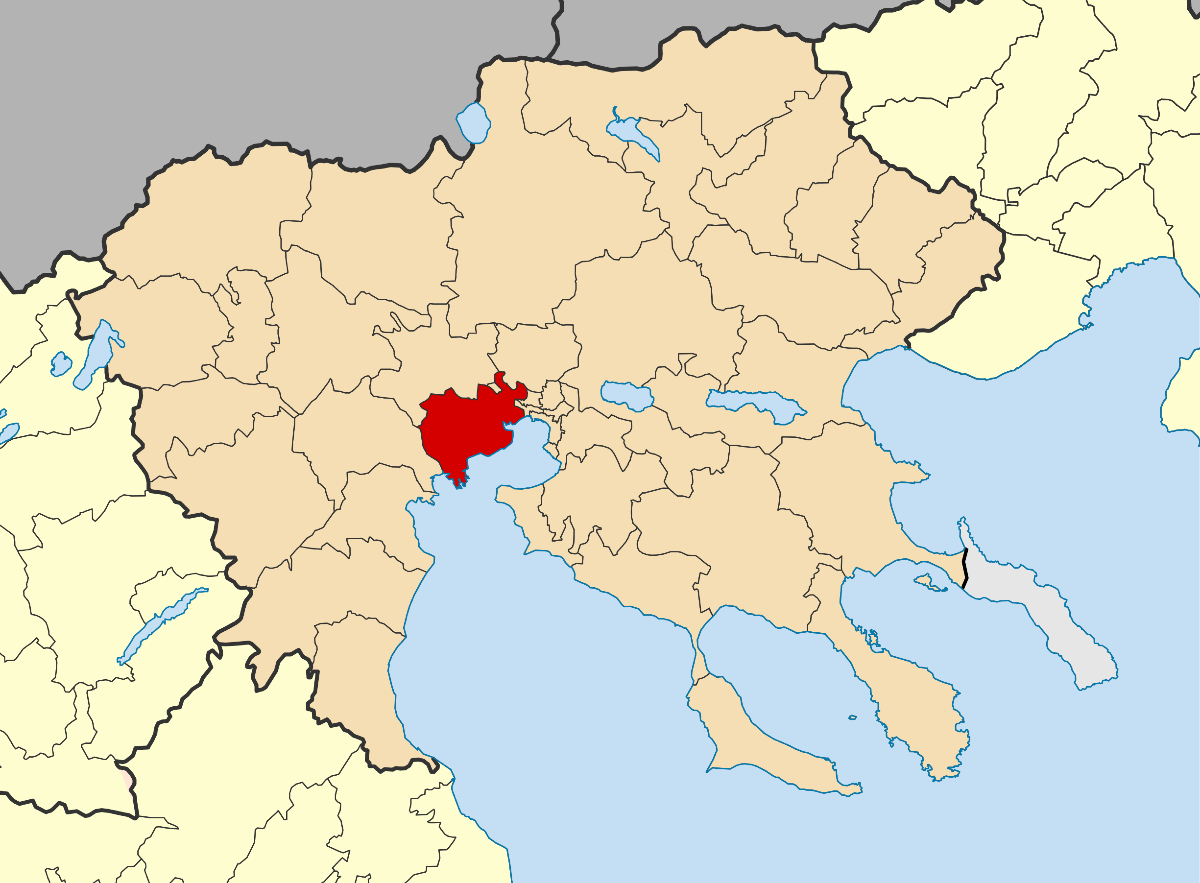

- Location within Greece
- Coordinates: 40°40′N 22°48′E
- Country: Greece
- Administrative region: Central Macedonia
- Regional unit: Thessaloniki
- Seat: Sindos

Area
  - Municipality: 311.09 km^{2} (120.11 sq mi)

Population (2021)
  - Municipality: 44,935
  - Density: 144.44/km^{2} (374.11/sq mi)
- Time zone: UTC+2 (EET)
  - Summer (DST): UTC+3 (EEST)

Delta (Greek: Δέλτα) is a municipality in the Thessaloniki regional unit of Central Macedonia, Greece. The seat of the municipality is the town of Sindos. It covers an area of 311.09 km^{2}.

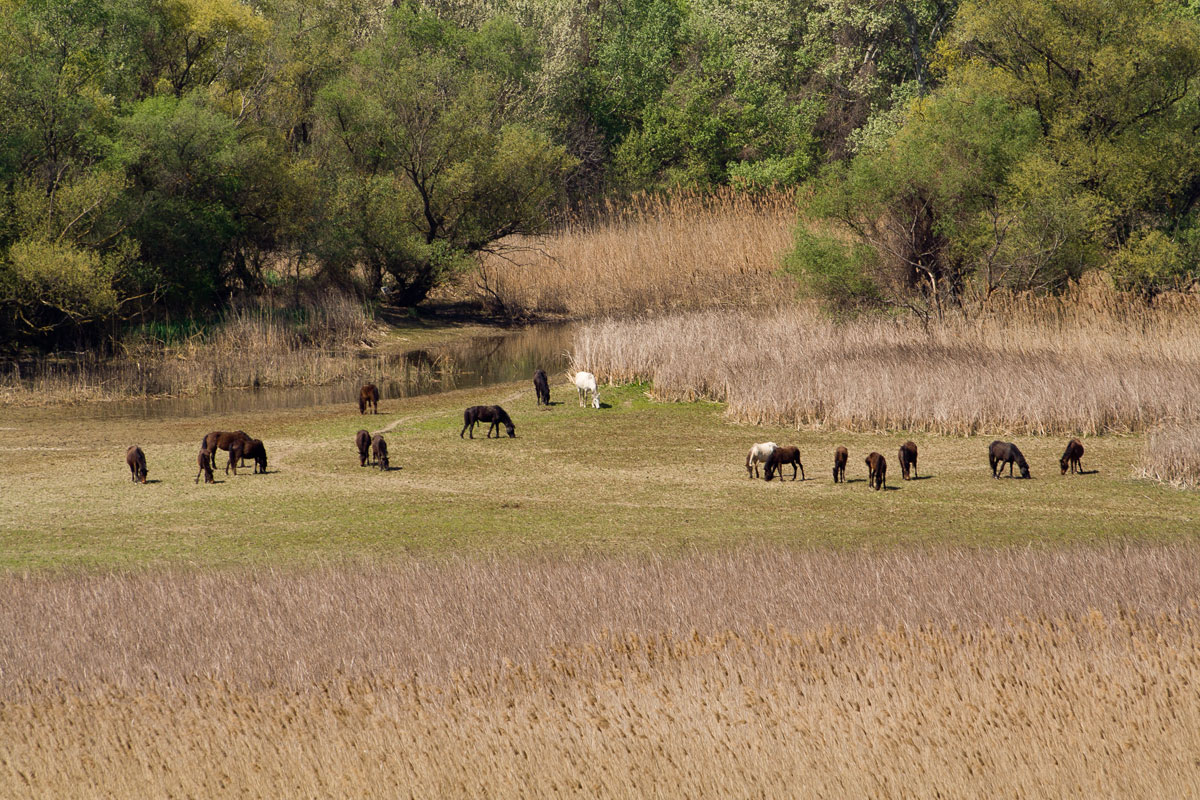
Wild horses in Delta

== Municipality ==
The municipality Delta was formed at the 2011 local government reform by the merger of the following 3 former municipalities, that became municipal units:

- Axios
- Chalastra
- Echedoros

It took its name from the delta (estuary) of Axios river.
