= Thermi =

Suburb of the Thessaloniki Urban Area, Greece

Thermi Θέρμη
- Municipality
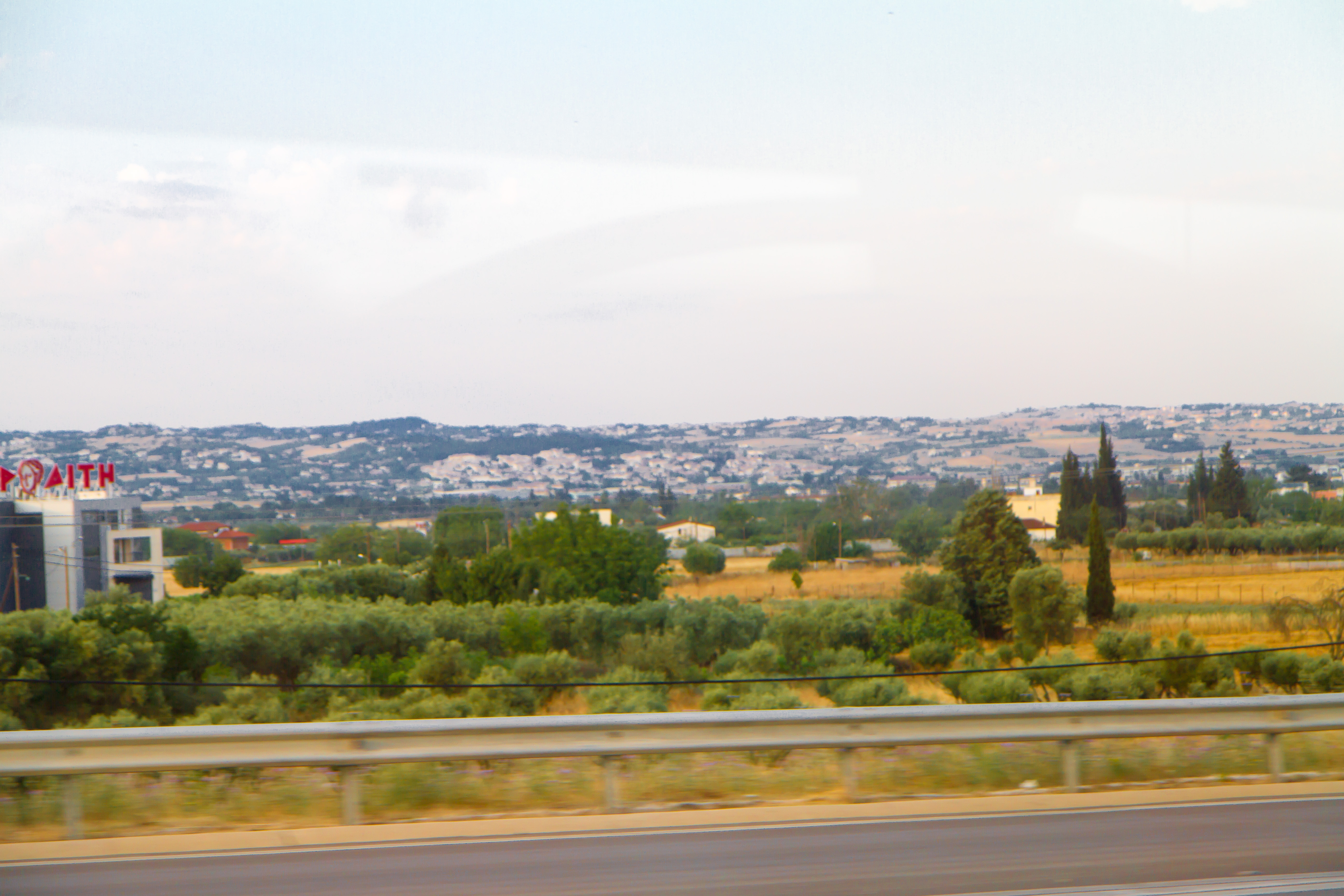
- View from the road

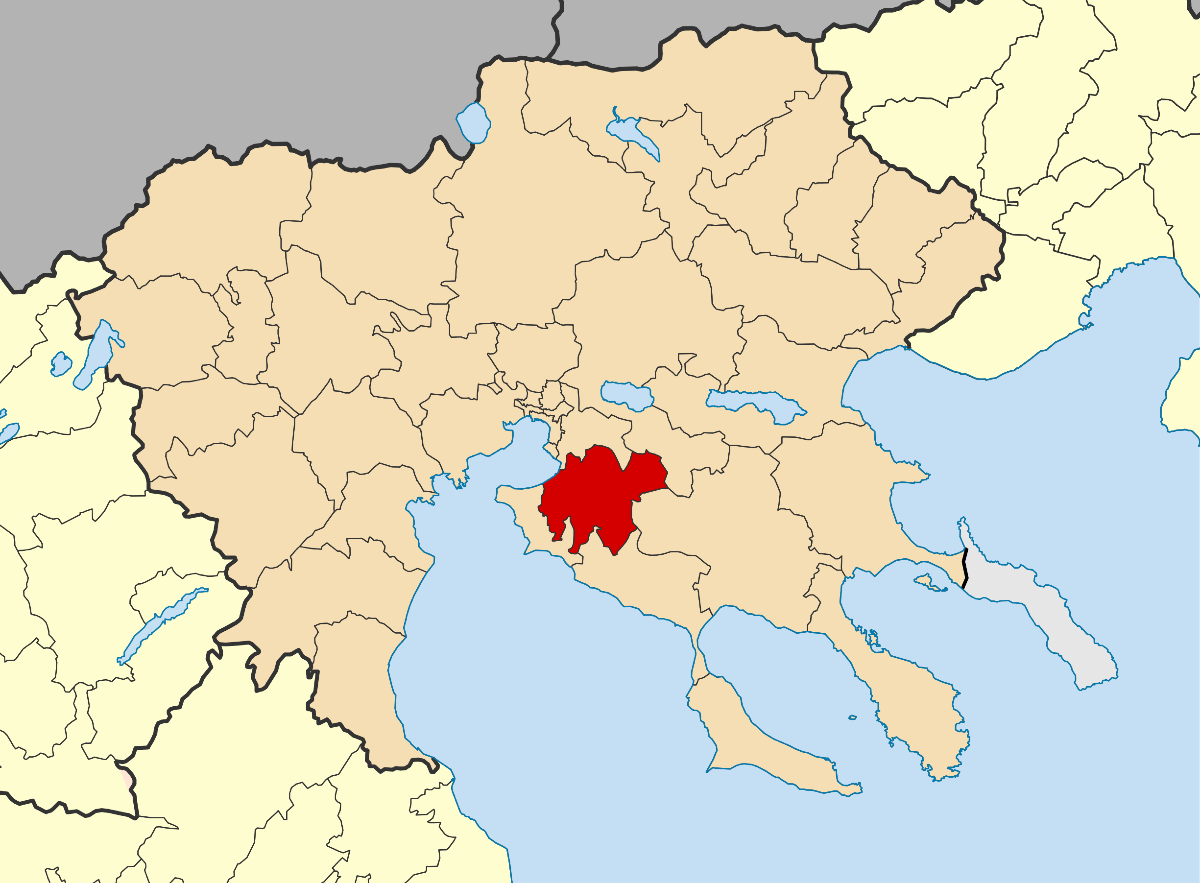

- Location within Greece
- Coordinates: 40°33′N 23°01′E
- Country: Greece
- Geographic region: Macedonia
- Administrative region: Central Macedonia
- Regional unit: Thessaloniki

Government
  - Mayor: Theodoros Papadopoulos (since 1998)

Area
  - Municipality: 382.11 km^{2} (147.53 sq mi)
  - Municipal unit: 100.94 km^{2} (38.97 sq mi)
- Elevation: 63 m (207 ft)

Population (2021)
  - Municipality: 55,358
  - Density: 144.87/km^{2} (375.22/sq mi)
  - Municipal unit: 28,630
  - Municipal unit density: 283.6/km^{2} (734.6/sq mi)
  - Community: 19,602
- Time zone: UTC+2 (EET)
  - Summer (DST): UTC+3 (EEST)

Thermi (Greek: Θέρμη, before 1926: Sedes) is a southeastern suburb and a municipality in the Thessaloniki regional unit, Macedonia, Greece. Its population was 55,358 at the 2021 census. It is located over the site of ancient Therma.

== Municipality ==
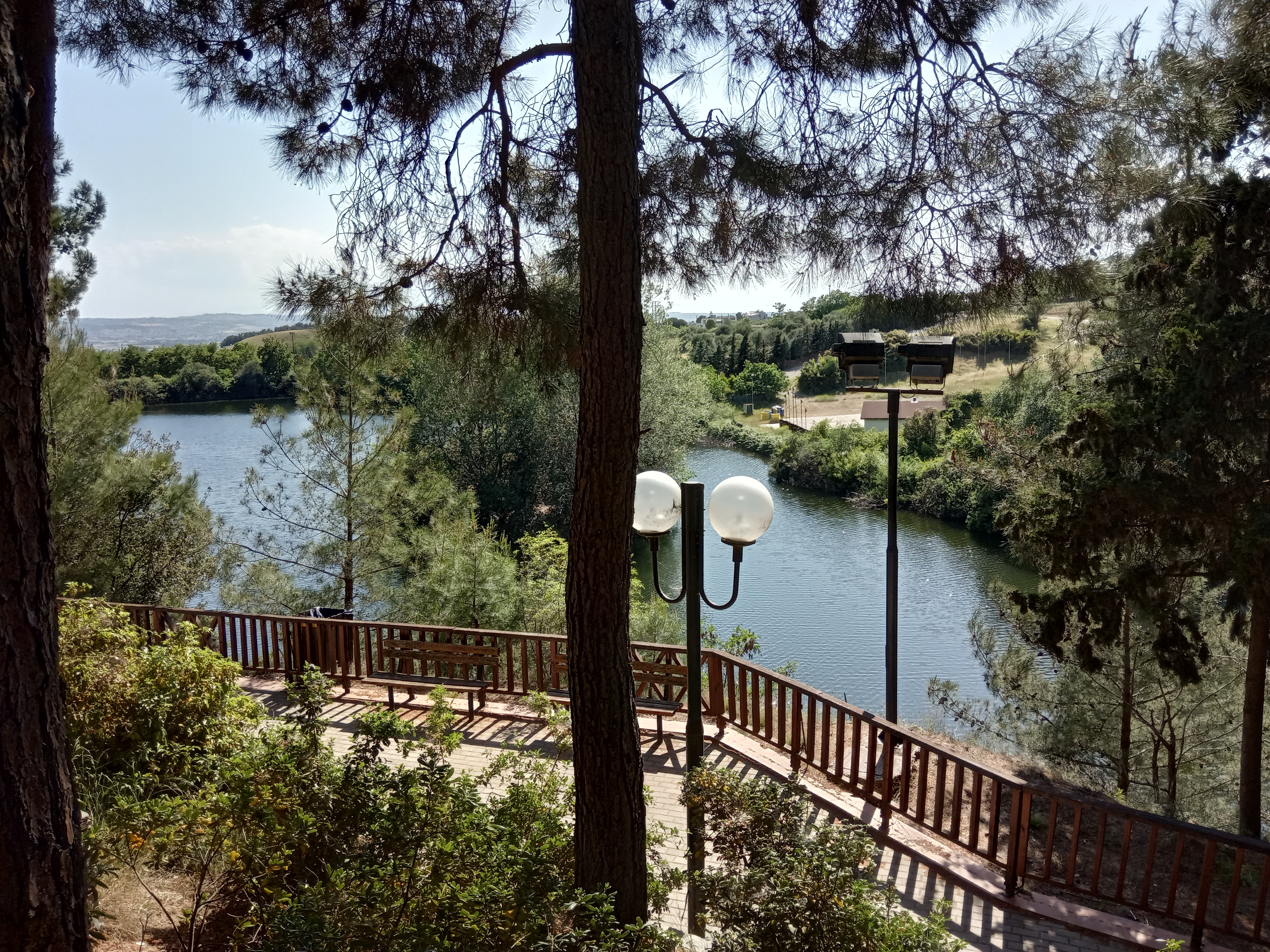
Dam of Thermi

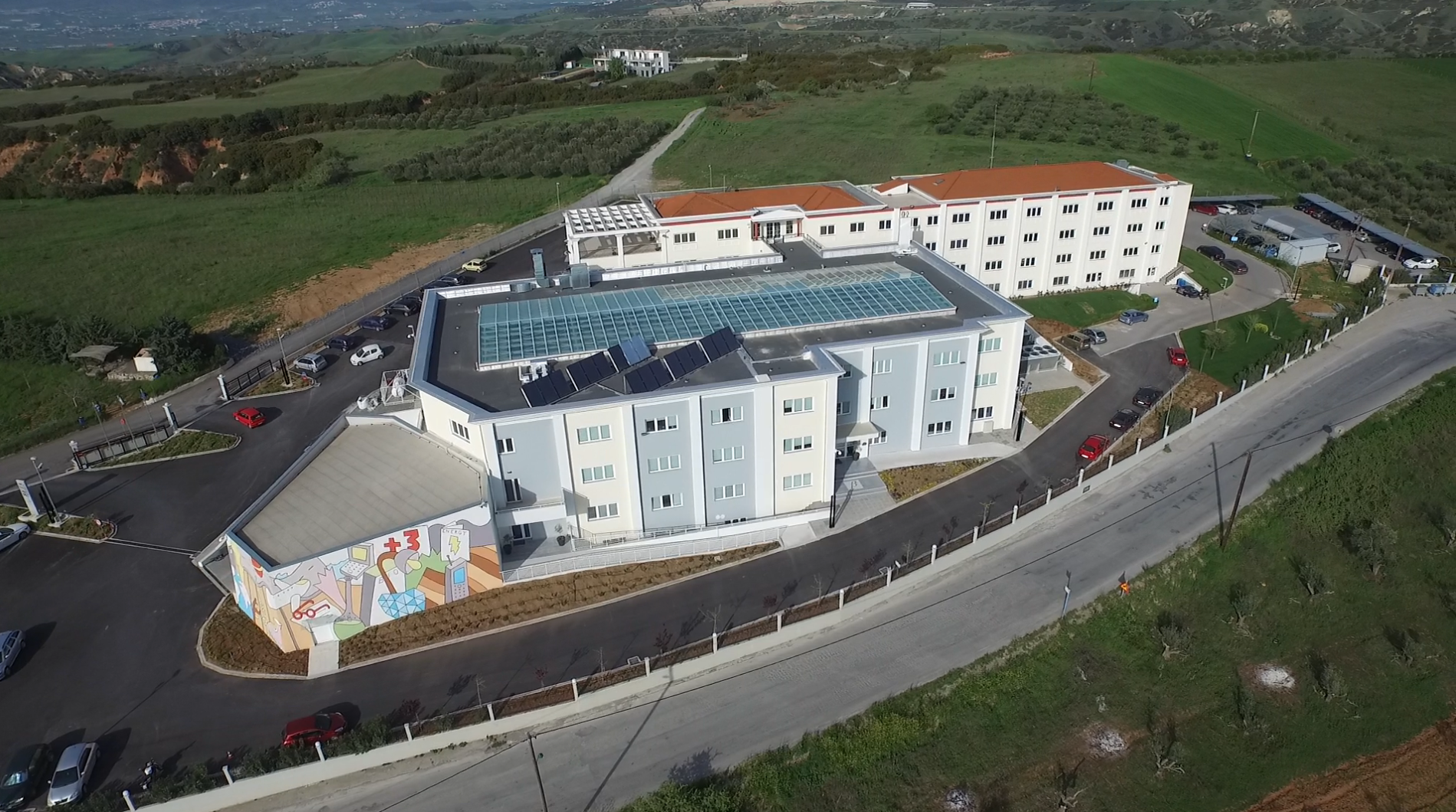
Technology center of BETA CAE Systems

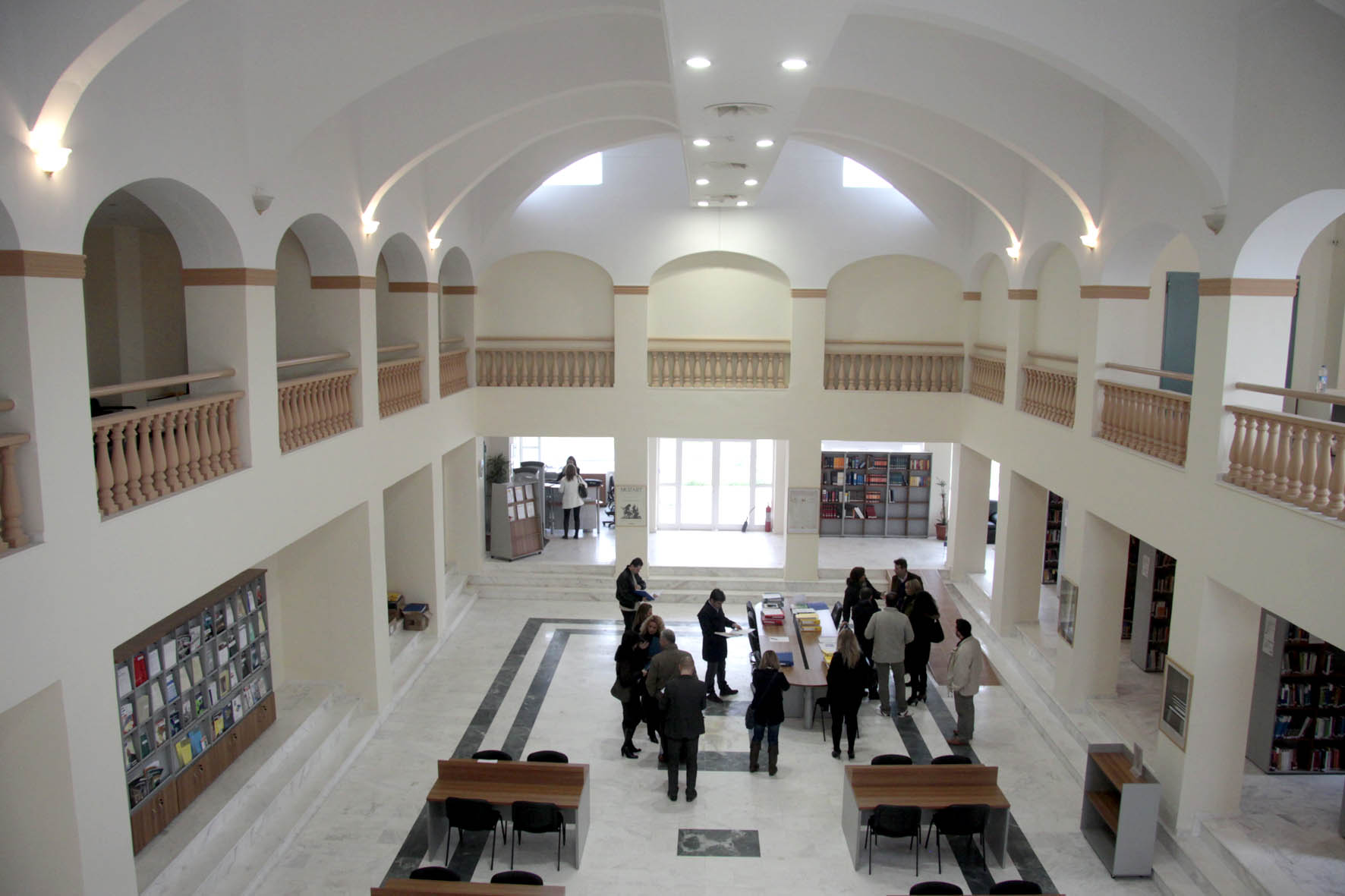
Interior of the International Hellenic University

The municipality Thermi was formed at the 2011 local government reform by the merger of the following 3 former municipalities, that became municipal units:

- Mikra
- Thermi
- Nea Raidestos
- Vasilika

The municipality Thermi has an area of 382.106 km^{2}, the municipal unit Thermi has an area of 100.943 km^{2}, and the community Thermi has an area of 55.90 km^{2}.

== History ==
Thermi is named after the ancient place Therma, according to Herodotus the Thermaic Gulf was named after Thermi

Thermi was initially a Neolithic settlement with evidence of stilt houses, clay dwellings, and communal areas for crafts. It flourished during the Archaic period (7th-6th centuries BC), with its harbour serving as a base for the Persian fleet in 480 BC

While some researchers place ancient Thermi in the centre of modern Thessaloniki, others suggest it was located at Ano Toumpa or Karabournaki, with a harbour at the latter. The area's strategic location led to its prominence during the Roman period, with Thessaloniki becoming the seat of the Roman province of Macedonia.

Thessaloniki, potentially built on the site of ancient Thermi, became a major centre during the Byzantine Empire, referred to as a "co-governing" city. It served as an important administrative, military, intellectual, and cultural hub, even vying for the position of Eastern Roman capital.

Proceeding Thermi's conquest by the Ottomans in 1430 the region was largely used by Ottoman farmers. The region belonged to Suleiman Pasha until the liberation of the region. Thessaloniki was a destination for the Jews who were expelled mainly from the Iberian Peninsula in 1492 but also from northern Europe, and thus a large Jewish congregation was formed in the city.

With the country's accession to the Greek state in 1912 and mainly after the Asia Minor disaster, refugees from Asia Minor settled in Thessaloniki as well as Some refugees from Mandritsa of East Romylia lived in the region. This influx of refugees led to the town gaining the unofficial title of "mother of refugees". 11 March 1917 Eleftherios Venizelos ordered the use of this region for the "needs of the population" with the region becoming reorganized in terms of urban planning and architecture, expanding its style with ancient Greek and European elements and destroying mainly Ottoman places of worship. In 1918 the community Thermi was established.

During World War II, Thessaloniki was occupied by Germany in addition to Thermi the city and municipality lost much of its strongly Jewish population. The city’s most culminating Jewish congregation was also destroyed.

Since 1994 Thermi has been a municipality.

== Education ==
Pinewood - The American International School is located in Thermi.

== Sports ==
Founded in 1949 the football club of the municipality is Thermaikos Thermis F.C. which currently plays in the local fourth tier of Greek football, Macedonia FCA First Division.
