= Lagkadas =

Town in Central Macedonia, Greece

Lagkadas Λαγκαδάς
- Municipality
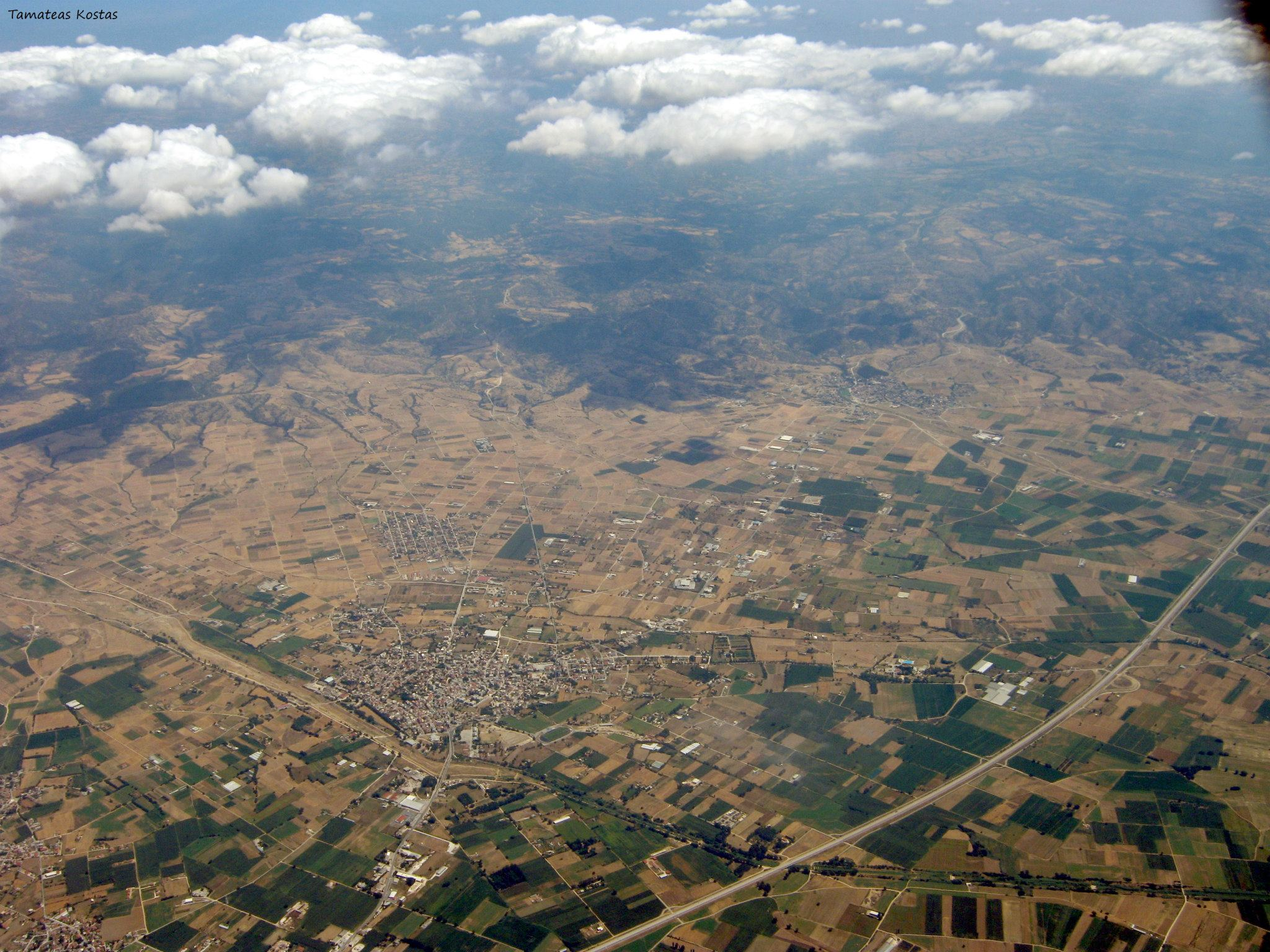
- An aerial picture of Lagkadas.

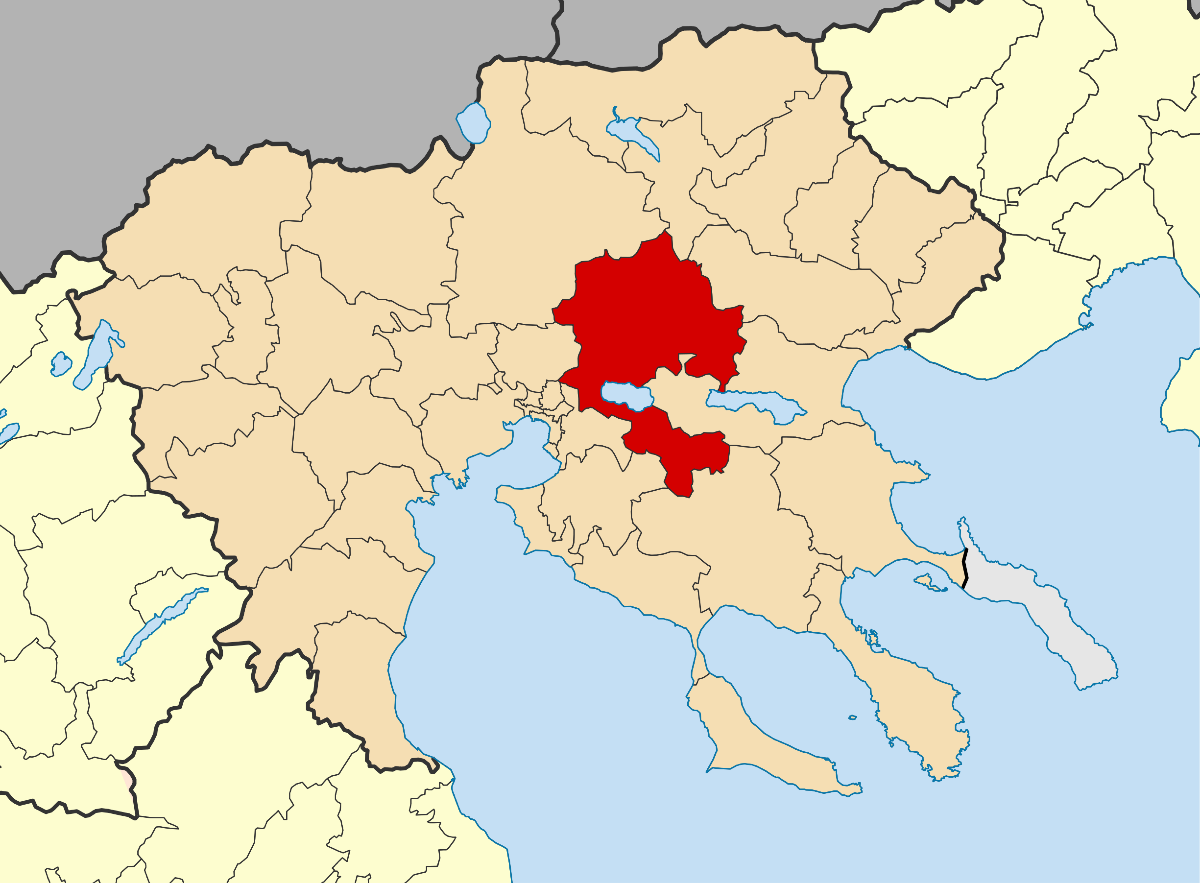

- Location within Greece
- Coordinates: 40°45′N 23°04′E
- Country: Greece
- Administrative region: Central Macedonia
- Regional unit: Thessaloniki

Government
  - Mayor: Niki Andreadou (since 2023)

Area
  - Municipality: 1,222.7 km^{2} (472.1 sq mi)
  - Municipal unit: 197.411 km^{2} (76.221 sq mi)
  - Community: 31.761 km^{2} (12.263 sq mi)
- Elevation: 113 m (371 ft)

Population (2021)
  - Municipality: 37,022
  - Density: 30.279/km^{2} (78.422/sq mi)
  - Municipal unit: 19,339
  - Municipal unit density: 97.963/km^{2} (253.72/sq mi)
  - Community: 8,447
  - Community density: 266.0/km^{2} (688.8/sq mi)
- Time zone: UTC+2 (EET)
  - Summer (DST): UTC+3 (EEST)
- Website: http://www.lagadas.gr

Lagkadas (Greek: Λαγκαδάς, Lagkadás) is a town and municipality in the northeast part of Thessaloniki regional unit, Greece. There are 37,022 residents in the municipality and 8,447 of them live in the community of Lagkadas (2021). Lagkadas is located northeast of Thessaloniki, at a distance of about 20 km from its center and at an altitude of about 130m, in the center of the valley of Mygdonia, through which Alexander the Great passed at his campaigns and also the Apostle Paul towards Thessaloniki and Athens. The climate is continental. Nearby is Lake Koroneia (or Lake Lagkada). The inhabitants of Lagkadas participated in the revolution of 1821, with the most famous fighter being Stavros Tzanis, who took part in many battles in southern Greece. The consequence was the destruction of the town in retaliation. During the Macedonian Struggle, the people of Lagkadas offered a lot, with the main Macedonian warrior, the chief Christos Dremlis.

== Municipality ==
The municipality of Lagkadas was formed at the 2011 local government reform by the merger of the following 7 former municipalities, that became municipal units:

- Assiros
- Kallindoia
- Koroneia
- Lachanas
- Lagkadas
- Sochos
- Vertiskos

The municipality of Langadas has an area of 1,222.65 km^{2}, the municipal unit Lagkadas has an area of 197.411 km^{2}, and the community Lagkadas has an area of 31.761 km^{2}. Lagkadas is well known for the famous thermal spa

== Climate ==
Lagkadas has a continental climate with significant temperature variations between winter and summer. On the 3rd of August 2021 the station of the National Observatory of Athens in Lagkadas registered 47.1 °C.

== Population ==
Many inhabitants are descendants of Greek refugees from the village of Kosti in Bulgaria.

The historical evolution of the population of Lagadas town is as follows:

Census	Population
1940	5,859
1951	7,660
1961	6,752
1971	6,708
1981	7,589
1991	6,280
2001	7,259
2011	7,764
2021	8,447

== Notable natives ==
- Stavros Tzanis, fighter of the Revolution of 1821
- Zübeyde Hanım (1857–1923), Mustafa Kemal Atatürk's mother
- Christos Dremlis, Macedonian warlord
- Antonis Remos, singer

== Transport ==
North of Lagkadas passes the Egnatia Odos (junction 24) connecting it with Thessaloniki. Lagkadas is connected to Thessaloniki by line 83 of OASTH (public buses).
