= Chalkidona =

Chalkidona Χαλκηδόνα
- Municipality
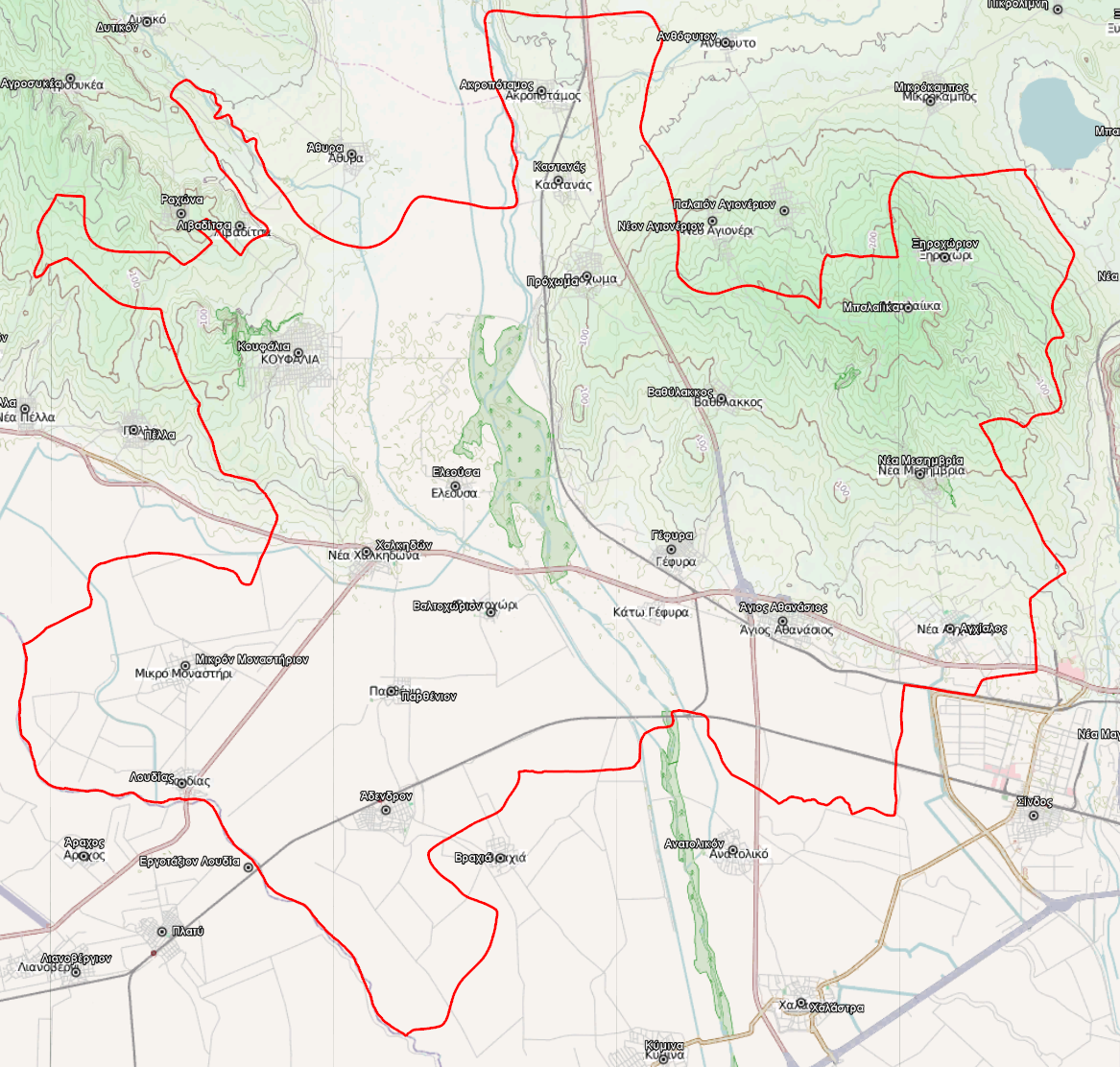

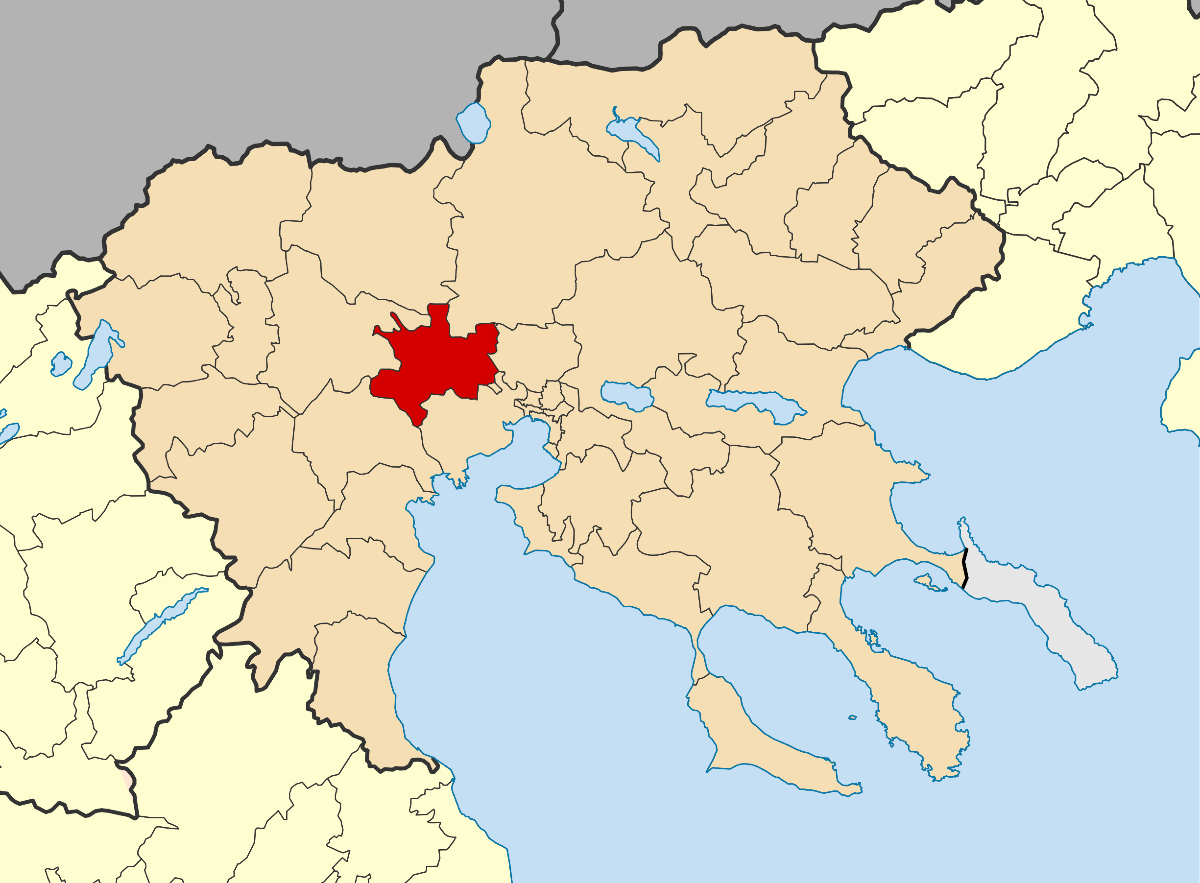

- Location within Greece
- Coordinates: 40°44′N 22°36′E
- Country: Greece
- Administrative region: Central Macedonia
- Regional unit: Thessaloniki

Area
  - Municipality: 391.4 km^{2} (151.1 sq mi)
  - Municipal unit: 130.0 km^{2} (50.2 sq mi)
  - Community: 21.25 km^{2} (8.20 sq mi)
- Elevation: 15 m (49 ft)

Population (2021)
  - Municipality: 30,030
  - Density: 76.72/km^{2} (198.7/sq mi)
  - Municipal unit: 7,542
  - Municipal unit density: 58.02/km^{2} (150.3/sq mi)
  - Community: 2,905
  - Community density: 136.7/km^{2} (354.1/sq mi)
- Time zone: UTC+2 (EET)
  - Summer (DST): UTC+3 (EEST)

Chalkidona (Greek: Χαλκηδόνα) is a municipality in the Thessaloniki regional unit, Greece. The seat of the municipality is Koufalia. The town is a hub for trucking traffic around the Thessaloniki area.

== Municipality ==
The municipality Chalkidona was formed at the 2011 local government reform by the merger of the following 3 former municipalities, that became municipal units:

- Agios Athanasios
- Chalkidona
- Koufalia

The municipality Chalkidona has an area of 391.4 km^{2}, the municipal unit Chalkidona has an area of 130.0 km^{2}, and the community Chalkidona has an area of 21.25 km^{2}.
