= Bromiscus =

Ancient Macedonian town

Coordinates: 40°40′37″N 23°40′41″E

Bromiscus or Bromiskos (Ancient Greek: Βρομίσκος), or Bormiscus or Bormiskos (Βορμίσκος), was a town of Mygdonia in ancient Macedonia, near the river by which the waters of Lake Bolbe flow into the Strymonic Gulf. It was either upon the site of this place or of the neighbouring Arethusa that the fortress of Rentina was built, which is frequently mentioned by the Byzantine historians. Stephanus of Byzantium relates that Euripides was here torn to death by dogs; but another legend supposes this event to have taken place at Arethusa, where the tomb of the poet was shown. It was mentioned in the Athenian tribute lists as a member of the Delian League in 422/1 BCE.

The site of Bromiscus is located near modern Kato Stavros.
