= Apollonia (Mygdonia) =

Ancient town in Mygdonia, Macedonia

Coordinates: 40°37′25″N 23°28′11″E

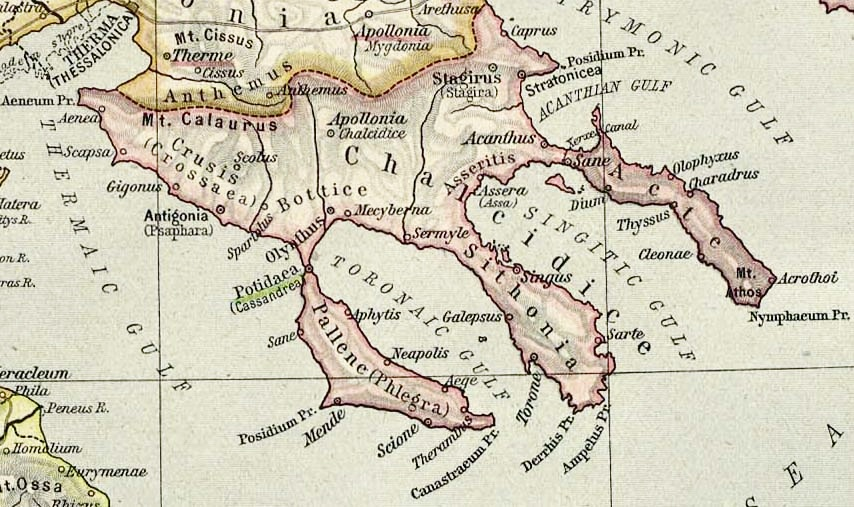
Location of Apollonia (Mygdonia) in the north, not to be confused with Apollonia (Chalcidice).

Apollonia (Ancient Greek: Ἀπολλωνία) was an ancient town of Mygdonia in Macedon. It was located south of Lake Volvi (ancient Lake Bolbe) and north of the Chalcidian mountains, on the route between Amphipolis and Thessalonica.

The town is mentioned by ancient geographical sources, including Pliny the Elder, and appears in the Acts of the Apostles as a place passed through by the Apostle Paul during his second missionary journey. Its remains are identified with the archaeological site of Bountroumia near modern Nea Apollonia in Central Macedonia, Greece.

== History ==
The wider region around Lake Volvi was inhabited from prehistoric times, although the urban settlement of Apollonia developed during later periods.

Apollonia was situated within Mygdonia, a region of northeastern Macedon between the Thermaic Gulf and Chalcidice. During the Classical period, the area became increasingly connected with the Macedonian kingdom, and Apollonia developed as an established settlement within Mygdonia.

The earliest historical reference to Apollonia is associated with Xenophon's Hellenica, where the town is mentioned in connection with events involving the Chalcidian League and Macedonian affairs in the 4th century BC.

The foundation of Apollonia has traditionally been connected with Chalcidian settlers during the conflicts between Macedon and the Chalcidian cities in the 5th century BC, although the exact circumstances of its establishment remain uncertain.

== Roman period ==
After the Roman conquest of Greece, Apollonia continued to be important because of its position on the Via Egnatia, the major Roman road connecting the Adriatic coast with Byzantium. Ancient itineraries place Apollonia on the route between Amphipolis and Thessalonica.

As a station on the Via Egnatia, Apollonia served travellers and officials moving through the Roman province of Macedonia. The town continued to develop, with archaeological evidence showing the existence of fortifications, public buildings, cemeteries, inscriptions, and urban infrastructure.

== Late Antiquity and Christianity ==
According to the Acts of the Apostles, Paul and his companions passed through Apollonia during their second missionary journey, travelling from Amphipolis before reaching Thessalonica. Although this reference preserved Apollonia in Christian geographical tradition, the text does not indicate a prolonged stay or the establishment of a Christian community there.

Apollonia remained inhabited in Late Antiquity. It appears among the cities of Macedonia in the Synecdemus of Hierocles, and archaeological remains from the site include evidence of Christian occupation, including an Early Christian basilica.

== Archaeology ==
The archaeological site of Apollonia lies at Bountroumia, south of Lake Volvi, near the modern settlements of Nea Apollonia, Apollonia, and Kokkalou.

The identification of the site was confirmed through archaeological research, ancient sources, and inscriptions. A Latin inscription mentioning the city, together with evidence connected with the reign of Emperor Hadrian, contributed to confirming the identification of ancient Apollonia.

Excavations have revealed a substantial fortified settlement. The city walls formed a circuit of approximately 3.1 kilometres and were reinforced with towers. The settlement covered around 33 hectares, with cemeteries located outside the fortifications.

Finds from the site demonstrate the economic and cultural life of the town. Excavations have uncovered pottery workshops, inscriptions, religious remains, a Macedonian tomb dating to the late 4th or early 3rd century BC, a gold ivy-leaf wreath, and a marble statue of Nike from the Hellenistic period.

== Legacy ==
Although Apollonia was not among the largest cities of ancient Macedonia, its position on the Via Egnatia and its mention in the New Testament ensured that the town remained known in historical and geographical traditions.

Today, the archaeological remains of Apollonia provide important evidence for settlement patterns, transportation networks, and urban life in ancient Mygdonia.

== See also ==
- List of ancient Greek cities
