= Plateia, Thessaloniki =

Plateia Πλατεία
- Settlement
- Location within Greece
- Coordinates: 40°37.9′N 23°20.9′E
- Country: Greece
- Administrative region: Central Macedonia
- Regional unit: Thessaloniki
- Municipality: Volvi
- Municipal unit: Apollonia
- Community: Peristerona
- Elevation: 480 m (1,570 ft)

Population (2021)
  - Total: 41
- Time zone: UTC+2 (EET)
  - Summer (DST): UTC+3 (EEST)
- Postal code: 570 20
- Area code: +30-2393
- Vehicle registration: NA to NX

Plateia (Greek: Πλατεία, [pla'tia]) is a village of the Volvi municipality. Before the 2011 local government reform it was part of the municipality of Apollonia. The 2021 census recorded 41 inhabitants in the village. Plateia is a part of the community of Peristerona.

== See also ==
- List of settlements in the Thessaloniki regional unit
