= Filadelfio =

Village in Central Macedonia, Greece

Filadelfio Φιλαδέλφιο
- Community
- Location within Greece
- Coordinates: 40°45′N 23°28.3′E
- Country: Greece
- Administrative region: Central Macedonia
- Regional unit: Thessaloniki
- Municipality: Volvi
- Municipal unit: Arethousa

Area
  - Community: 48.573 km^{2} (18.754 sq mi)
- Elevation: 395 m (1,296 ft)

Population (2021)
  - Community: 650
  - Density: 13/km^{2} (35/sq mi)
- Time zone: UTC+2 (EET)
  - Summer (DST): UTC+3 (EEST)
- Postal code: 570 16
- Area code: +30-2395
- Vehicle registration: NA to NX

Filadelfio (Greek: Φιλαδέλφιο) is a village and a community of the Volvi municipality in Greece. Before the 2011 local government reform it was part of the municipality of Arethousa, of which it was a municipal district. The 2021 census recorded 650 inhabitants in the community. The community of Filadelfio covers an area of 48.573 km^{2}.

== Administrative division ==
The community of Filadelfio consists of three separate settlements (2021 populations):

- Anoixia (population 174)
- Filadelfio (population 228)
- Xiropotamos (population 248)

== See also ==
- List of settlements in the Thessaloniki regional unit
