= Vaiochori =

Vaiochori Βαϊοχώρι
- Settlement
- Location within Greece
- Coordinates: 40°42.7′N 23°22.9′E
- Country: Greece
- Administrative region: Central Macedonia
- Regional unit: Thessaloniki
- Municipality: Volvi
- Municipal unit: Egnatia
- Community: Nymfopetra
- Elevation: 120 m (390 ft)

Population (2021)
  - Total: 515
- Time zone: UTC+2 (EET)
  - Summer (DST): UTC+3 (EEST)
- Postal code: 570 16
- Area code: +30-2393
- Vehicle registration: NA to NX

Vaiochori (Greek: Βαϊοχώρι, Greek pronunciation: [vaĭo'xoɾi]) is a village of the Volvi municipality. Before the 2011 local government reform it was part of the municipality of Egnatia. The 2021 census recorded 515 inhabitants in the village. Vaiochori is a part of the community of Nymfopetra.

== See also ==
- List of settlements in the Thessaloniki regional unit
