= Stefanina, Thessaloniki =

Stefanina Στεφανινά
- Community

- Location within Greece
- Coordinates: 40°45.6′N 23°35.4′E
- Country: Greece
- Administrative region: Central Macedonia
- Regional unit: Thessaloniki
- Municipality: Volvi
- Municipal unit: Arethousa

Area
  - Community: 55.996 km^{2} (21.620 sq mi)
- Elevation: 493 m (1,617 ft)

Population (2021)
  - Community: 284
  - Density: 5.07/km^{2} (13.1/sq mi)
- Time zone: UTC+2 (EET)
  - Summer (DST): UTC+3 (EEST)
- Postal code: 570 21
- Area code: +30-2395
- Vehicle registration: NA to NX

Stefanina (Greek: Στεφανινά) is a village and a community of the Volvi municipality. Before the 2011 local government reform it was part of the municipality of Arethousa, of which it was a municipal district. The 2021 census recorded 284 inhabitants in the community. The community of Stefanina covers an area of 55.996 km^{2}.

== Administrative division ==
The community of Stefanina consists of two separate settlements (2021 populations):

- Kato Stefanina (population 33)
- Stefanina (population 251)

== See also ==
- List of settlements in the Thessaloniki regional unit
