= Peristerona, Thessaloniki =

Peristerona Περιστερώνα
- Community
- Location within Greece
- Coordinates: 40°39.7′N 23°20.4′E
- Country: Greece
- Administrative region: Central Macedonia
- Regional unit: Thessaloniki
- Municipality: Volvi
- Municipal unit: Apollonia

Area
  - Community: 51.161 km^{2} (19.753 sq mi)
- Elevation: 154 m (505 ft)

Population (2021)
  - Community: 305
  - Density: 5.96/km^{2} (15.4/sq mi)
- Time zone: UTC+2 (EET)
  - Summer (DST): UTC+3 (EEST)
- Postal code: 570 20
- Area code: +30-2393
- Vehicle registration: NA to NX

Peristerona (Greek: Περιστερώνα) is a village and a community of the Volvi municipality. Before the 2011 local government reform it was part of the municipality of Apollonia, of which it was a municipal district. The 2021 census recorded 305 inhabitants in the community. The community of Peristerona covers an area of 51.161 km^{2}.

== Administrative division ==
The community of Peristerona consists of three separate settlements:

- Peristerona (population 240 as of 2021)
- Plateia (population 41)
- Spitakia (population 24)

== See also ==
- List of settlements in the Thessaloniki regional unit
