= Paliampela, Thessaloniki =

Paliampela Παλιάμπελα
- Settlement
- Location within Greece
- Coordinates: 40°42.5′N 23°41.5′E
- Country: Greece
- Administrative region: Central Macedonia
- Regional unit: Thessaloniki
- Municipality: Volvi
- Municipal unit: Agios Georgios
- Community: Vrasna
- Elevation: 30 m (98 ft)

Population (2021)
  - Total: 57
- Time zone: UTC+2 (EET)
  - Summer (DST): UTC+3 (EEST)
- Postal code: 570 21
- Area code: +30-2397
- Vehicle registration: NA to NX

Paliampela (Greek: Παλιάμπελα, Greek pronunciation: [pa'ʎabela]) is a village of the Volvi municipality. Before the 2011 local government reform it was not an officially recognised settlement. The 2021 census recorded 57 inhabitants in the village. Paliampela is a part of the community of Vrasna.

== See also ==
- List of settlements in the Thessaloniki regional unit
