= Mikra Volvi =

Village in Central Macedonia, Greece

Mikra Volvi Μικρά Βόλβη
- Settlement

- Location within Greece
- Coordinates: 40°40.6′N 23°33.6′E
- Country: Greece
- Administrative region: Central Macedonia
- Regional unit: Thessaloniki
- Municipality: Volvi
- Municipal unit: Rentina
- Community: Volvi
- Elevation: 50 m (160 ft)

Population (2021)
  - Total: 478
- Time zone: UTC+2 (EET)
  - Summer (DST): UTC+3 (EEST)
- Postal code: 570 14
- Area code: +30-2397
- Vehicle registration: NA to NX

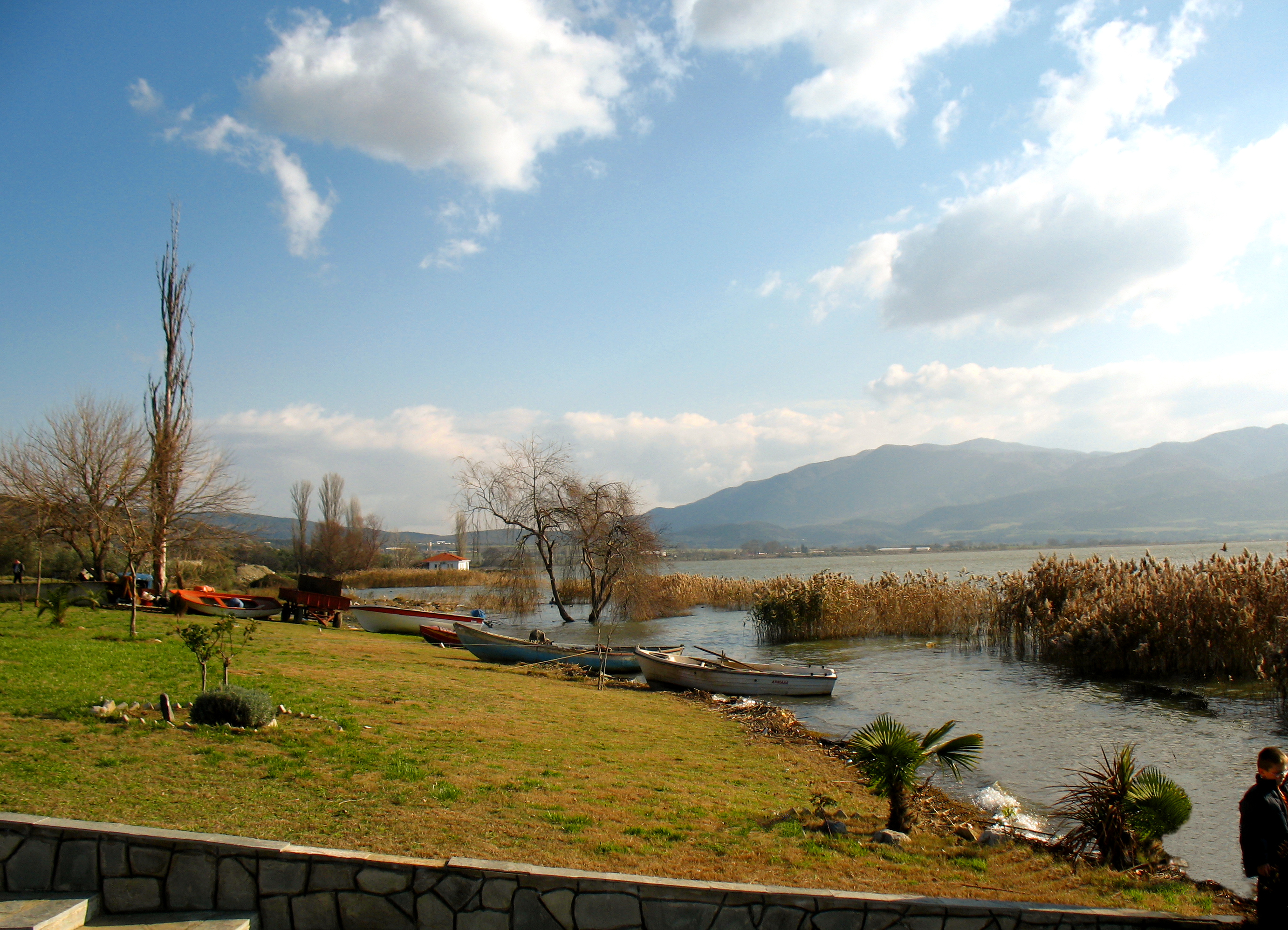

Mikra Volvi (Greek: Μικρά Βόλβη) is a village of the Volvi municipality. Before the 2011 local government reform it was part of the municipality of Rentina. The 2021 census recorded 478 inhabitants in the village. Mikra Volvi is a part of the community of Volvi.

== See also ==
- List of settlements in the Thessaloniki regional unit
