= Lazaros Sarantoglou =

Greek builder (1862–1924)

- Lazaros Sarantoglou
- Born: Lazaros; 1862; Madytos in Çanakkale, Ottoman Empire
- Died: 1924 (aged 61–62); Athens, Greece
- Occupation: Building general contractor
- Known for: Building of the Evangelismos General Hospital of Athens and other constructions

Lazaros Sarantoglou (Greek: Λάζαρος Σαραντόγλου) was born in Madytos in 1862 and died in Athens in 1924.

== Life ==
The son of Charalampos Sarantoglou, he had two brothers, Georgios and Nikolaos Sarantoglou. He left his home at an early age after having received the basic education. He first went to Constantinople, where he apprenticed with some of the masters and architects from Madytos, and then left for Athens, his skill and honesty made him one of the renowned contractors of that era, who undertook the construction of large buildings, thus acquiring considerable wealth.

In Athens, Sarantoglou often intervened on behalf of fellow Madytians when they came to Athens, primarily to seek medical care. They were hosted at his home on Methonis street and he cared for them to be hospitalized in the Evangelismos Hospital, to which he had bequeathed part of his big fortune, on the condition that there would always be two free beds available for Madytians needing treatment.

Lazaros Sarantoglou was one of the personal and political friends of the politician and Mayor of Athens Dimitrios Kallifronas.

Great appreciation was also shown by Sarantoglou to the then Archbishop of Athens and all Greece Chrysostomos Papadopoulos. It was at his suggestion, that he also gave a large amount to the Amalieion Orphanage.

His heirs, in his memory, further donated a large amount of money for the completion of the church of St. John the Baptist in Nea Madytos of Thessaloniki.

Two roads are named after him, in Nea Filadelfeia of Athens, and the road joining the motorway and the square in Nea Madytos of Thessaloniki.
