= Anoixia =

Anoixia Ανοιξιά
- Settlement
- Location within Greece
- Coordinates: 40°45.5′N 23°26.8′E
- Country: Greece
- Administrative region: Central Macedonia
- Regional unit: Thessaloniki
- Municipality: Volvi
- Municipal unit: Arethousa
- Community: Filadelfio
- Elevation: 400 m (1,300 ft)

Population (2021)
  - Total: 174
- Time zone: UTC+2 (EET)
  - Summer (DST): UTC+3 (EEST)
- Postal code: 570 16
- Area code: +30-2395
- Vehicle registration: NA to NX

Anoixia (Greek: Ανοιξιά, Greek pronunciation: [ani'ksça]) is a village of the Volvi municipality. Before the 2011 local government reform it was part of the municipality of Arethousa. The 2021 census recorded 174 inhabitants in the village. Anoixia is a part of the community of Filadelfio.

== See also ==
- List of settlements in the Thessaloniki regional unit
