= Limni, Thessaloniki =

Village in Central Macedonia, Greece

Limni Λίμνη
- Settlement
- Location within Greece
- Coordinates: 40°46.9′N 23°31.7′E
- Country: Greece
- Administrative region: Central Macedonia
- Regional unit: Thessaloniki
- Municipality: Volvi
- Municipal unit: Arethousa
- Community: Skepasto
- Village established: 1922 (104 years ago)
- Elevation: 360 m (1,180 ft)

Population (2021)
  - Total: 195
- Time zone: UTC+2 (EET)
  - Summer (DST): UTC+3 (EEST)
- Postal code: 570 02
- Area code: +30-2395
- Vehicle registration: NA to NX

Limni (Greek: Λίμνη) is a village in the Volvi municipality of Central Macedonia, Greece. Before the 2011 local government reform it was part of the municipality of Arethousa, of which it was a municipal district. The 2021 census recorded 195 inhabitants in the village. Limni is part of the community of Skepasto. The village is built on the foot of Mount Kerdilia which separates the regional unit of Thessaloniki from the regional unit of Serres. Most inhabitants are of Pontic Greek origin, having settled in the area in 1922 after leaving the Black Sea region.

== See also ==
- List of settlements in the Thessaloniki regional unit
