= Vamvakia, Thessaloniki =

Village in Volvi, Greece

Vamvakia Βαμβακιά
- Settlement

- Location within Greece
- Coordinates: 40°41.3′N 23°36.6′E
- Country: Greece
- Administrative region: Central Macedonia
- Regional unit: Thessaloniki
- Municipality: Volvi
- Municipal unit: Rentina
- Community: Volvi
- Elevation: 140 m (460 ft)

Population (2021)
  - Total: 150
- Time zone: UTC+2 (EET)
  - Summer (DST): UTC+3 (EEST)
- Postal code: 570 14
- Area code: +30-2397
- Vehicle registration: NA to NX

Vamvakia (Greek: Βαμβακιά) is a village of the Volvi municipality. Before the 2011 local government reform it was part of the municipality of Rentina. The 2021 census recorded 150 inhabitants in the village. Vamvakia is a part of the community of Volvi.

== See also ==
- List of settlements in the Thessaloniki regional unit
