= Nymfopetra =

Village in Central Macedonia, Greece

Nymfopetra Νυμφόπετρα
- Community

- Location within Greece
- Coordinates: 40°41.6′N 23°19.7′E
- Country: Greece
- Administrative region: Central Macedonia
- Regional unit: Thessaloniki
- Municipality: Volvi
- Municipal unit: Egnatia

Area
  - Community: 28.799 km^{2} (11.119 sq mi)
- Elevation: 119 m (390 ft)

Population (2021)
  - Community: 1,049
  - Density: 36.42/km^{2} (94.34/sq mi)
- Time zone: UTC+2 (EET)
  - Summer (DST): UTC+3 (EEST)
- Postal code: 570 16
- Area code: +30-2393
- Vehicle registration: NA to NX

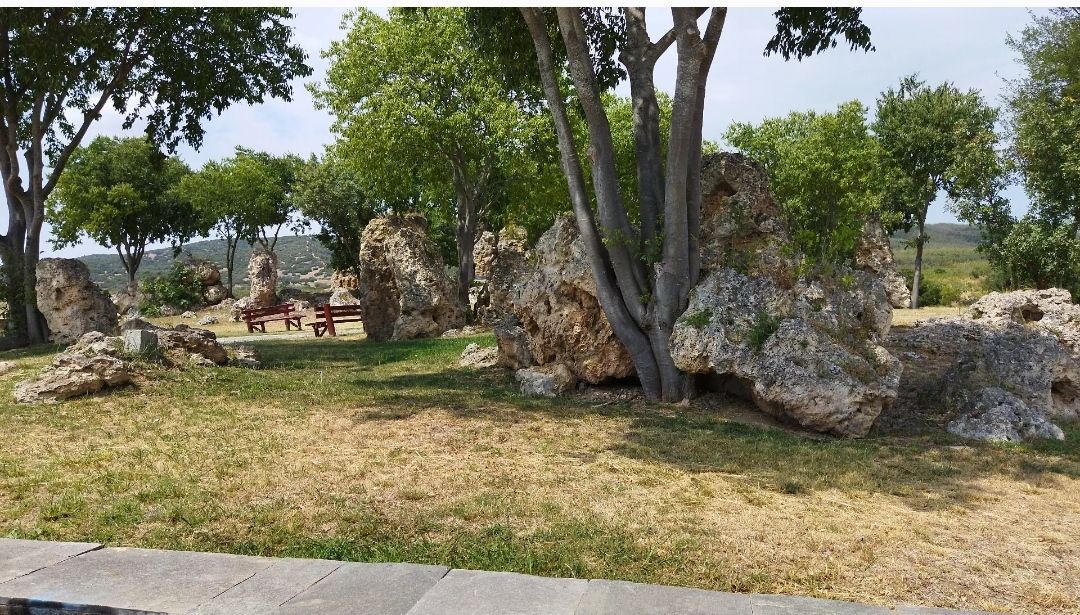
The area of Nymphopetra

Nymfopetra (Greek: Νυμφόπετρα) is a village and a community of the Volvi municipality in Greece. Before the 2011 local government reform it was part of the municipality of Egnatia, of which it was a municipal district. The 2021 census recorded 1,049 inhabitants in the community. The community of Nymfopetra covers an area of 28.799 km^{2}.

== Administrative division ==
The community of Nymfopetra consists of two separate settlements (2021 populations):

- Nymfopetra (population 534)
- Vaiochori (population 515)

== See also ==
- List of settlements in the Thessaloniki regional unit
