= Kato Stefanina =

Kato Stefanina Κάτω Στεφανινά
- Settlement
- Location within Greece
- Coordinates: 40°45.6′N 23°34.5′E
- Country: Greece
- Administrative region: Central Macedonia
- Regional unit: Thessaloniki
- Municipality: Volvi
- Municipal unit: Arethousa
- Community: Stefanina
- Elevation: 420 m (1,380 ft)

Population (2021)
  - Total: 33
- Time zone: UTC+2 (EET)
  - Summer (DST): UTC+3 (EEST)
- Postal code: 570 21
- Area code: +30-2395
- Vehicle registration: NA to NX

Kato Stefanina (Greek: Κάτω Στεφανινά, Greek pronunciation: ['kato stefani'na]) is a village of the Volvi municipality. Before the 2011 local government reform it was part of the municipality of Arethousa. The 2021 census recorded 33 inhabitants in the village. Kato Stefanina is a part of the community of Stefanina.

== See also ==
- List of settlements in the Thessaloniki regional unit
