= Loutra Volvis =

Village in Central Macedonia, Greece

Loutra Volvis Λουτρά Βόλβης
- Settlement
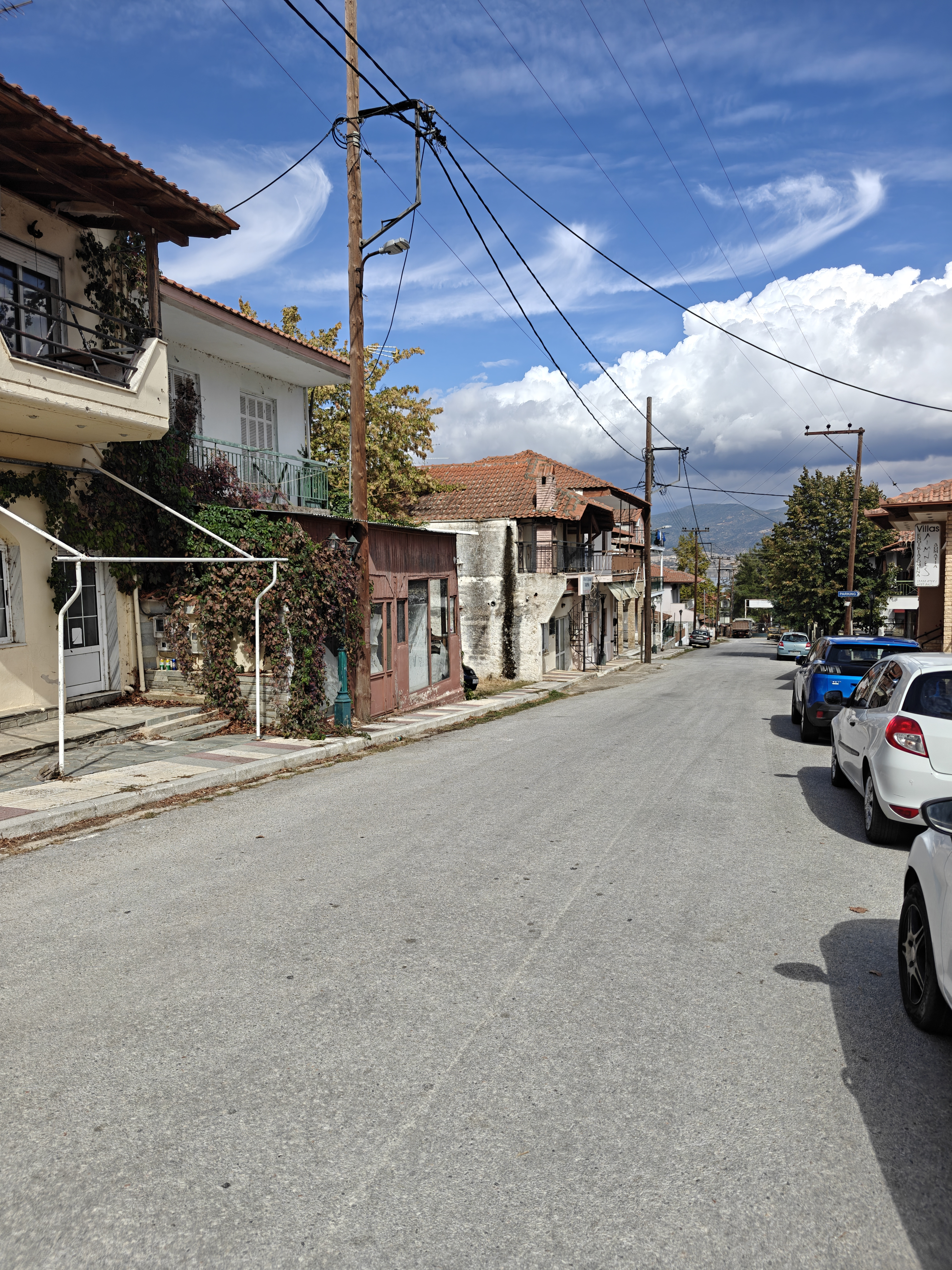

- Location within Greece
- Coordinates: 40°39.5′N 23°24.2′E
- Country: Greece
- Administrative region: Central Macedonia
- Regional unit: Thessaloniki
- Municipality: Volvi
- Municipal unit: Apollonia
- Community: Nea Apollonia
- Elevation: 50 m (160 ft)

Population (2021)
  - Total: 70
- Time zone: UTC+2 (EET)
  - Summer (DST): UTC+3 (EEST)
- Postal code: 570 15
- Area code: +30-2393
- Vehicle registration: NA to NX

Loutra Volvis (Greek: Λουτρά Βόλβης, [ly'tɾa 'volvis]) is a village of the Volvi municipality. Before the 2011 local government reform it was part of the municipality of Apollonia. The 2021 census recorded 70 inhabitants in the village. Loutra Volvis is a part of the community of Nea Apollonia.

== See also ==
- List of settlements in the Thessaloniki regional unit
