= Skepasto, Thessaloniki =

Skepasto Σκεπαστό
- Community
- Location within Greece
- Coordinates: 40°48.5′N 23°31.1′E
- Country: Greece
- Administrative region: Central Macedonia
- Regional unit: Thessaloniki
- Municipality: Volvi
- Municipal unit: Arethousa

Area
  - Community: 30.214 km^{2} (11.666 sq mi)
- Elevation: 402 m (1,319 ft)

Population (2021)
  - Community: 431
  - Density: 14.3/km^{2} (36.9/sq mi)
- Time zone: UTC+2 (EET)
  - Summer (DST): UTC+3 (EEST)
- Postal code: 570 02
- Area code: +30-2395
- Vehicle registration: NA to NX

Skepasto (Greek: Σκεπαστό) is a village and a community of the Volvi municipality. Before the 2011 local government reform it was part of the municipality of Arethousa, of which it was a municipal district. The 2021 census recorded 431 inhabitants in the community. The community of Skepasto covers an area of 30.214 km^{2}.

== Administrative division ==
The community of Skepasto consists of two separate settlements (2021 populations):

- Limni (population 195)
- Skepasto (population 236)

== See also ==
- List of settlements in the Thessaloniki regional unit
