= Nea Vrasna =

Village in Central Macedonia, Greece

Nea Vrasna Νέα Βρασνά
- Settlement
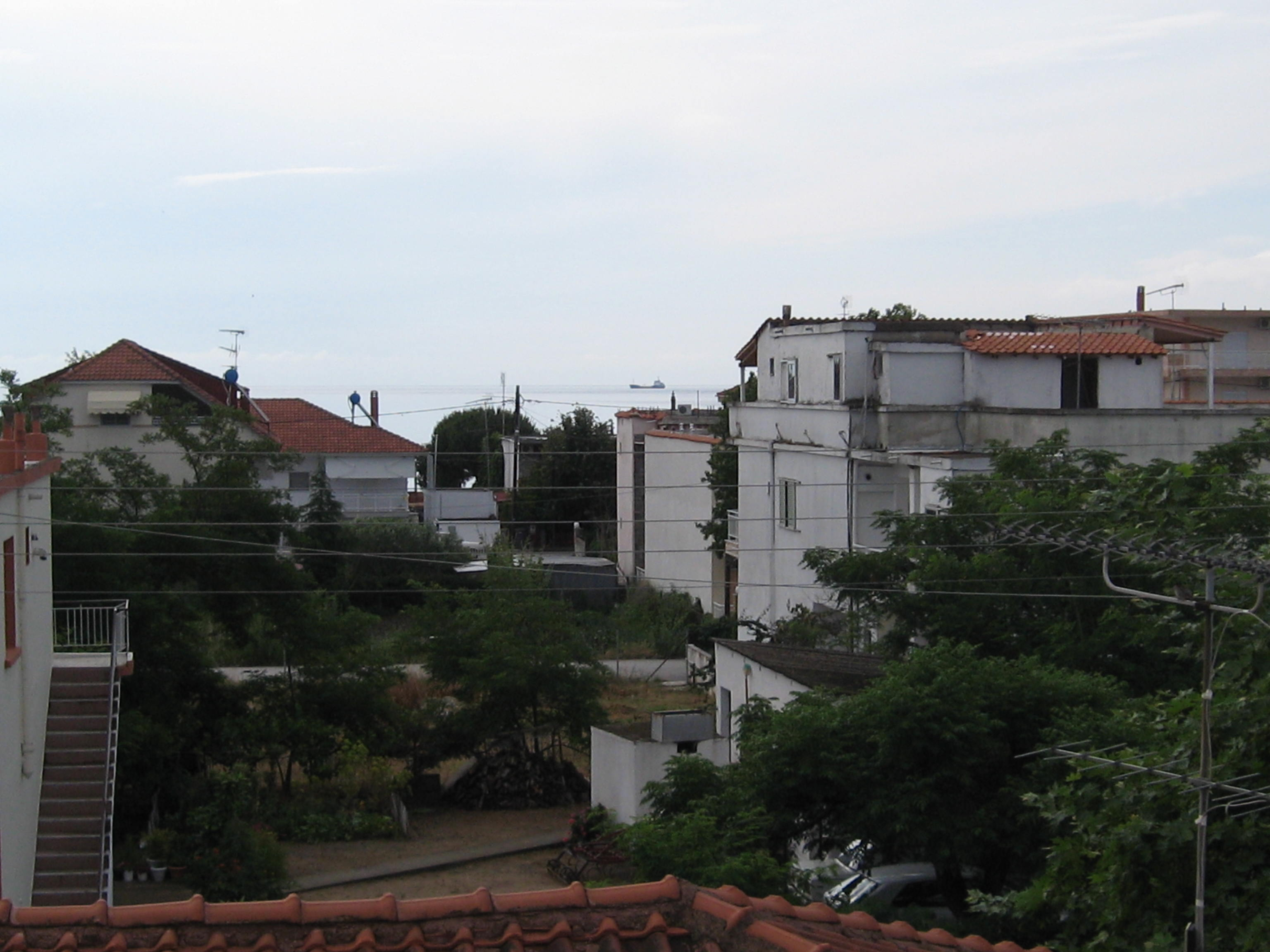
- A view of Nea Vrasna

- Location within Greece
- Coordinates: 40°42.3′N 23°41.9′E
- Country: Greece
- Administrative region: Central Macedonia
- Regional unit: Thessaloniki
- Municipality: Volvi
- Municipal unit: Agios Georgios
- Community: Vrasna
- Elevation: 5 m (16 ft)

Population (2021)
  - Total: 1,841
- Time zone: UTC+2 (EET)
  - Summer (DST): UTC+3 (EEST)
- Postal code: 570 21
- Area code: +30-2397
- Vehicle registration: NA to NX

Nea Vrasna (Greek: Νέα Βρασνά, Néa Vrasná ['nea vɾas'na]) is a village and a community of the Volvi municipality. Before the 2011 local government reform it was part of the municipality of Agios Georgios. The 2021 census recorded 1,841 inhabitants in the village. Nea Vrasna is a part of the community of Vrasna.

== See also ==
- List of settlements in the Thessaloniki regional unit
