= Volvi =

Volvi may refer to:

- The edible bulbs of the grape hyacinth
- Lake Volvi in Greece
- Volvi (municipality) in Greece
- "Volví", a 2021 song by Aventura and Bad Bunny
