= Mikrokomi =

Mikrokomi Μικροκώμη
- Settlement
- Location within Greece
- Coordinates: 40°43.3′N 23°17.1′E
- Country: Greece
- Administrative region: Central Macedonia
- Regional unit: Thessaloniki
- Municipality: Volvi
- Municipal unit: Egnatia
- Community: Profitis
- Elevation: 290 m (950 ft)

Population (2021)
  - Total: 51
- Time zone: UTC+2 (EET)
  - Summer (DST): UTC+3 (EEST)
- Postal code: 572 00
- Area code: +30-2393
- Vehicle registration: NA to NX

Mikrokomi (Greek: Μικροκώμη, Greek pronunciation: [mikɾo'komi]) is a village and a community of the Volvi municipality. Before the 2011 local government reform it was part of the municipality of Egnatia. The 2021 census recorded 51 inhabitants in the village. Mikrokomi is a part of the community of Profitis.

== See also ==
- List of settlements in the Thessaloniki regional unit
