= Spitakia, Thessaloniki =

Spitakia Σπιτάκια
- Settlement
- Location within Greece
- Coordinates: 40°39.4′N 23°19.5′E
- Country: Greece
- Administrative region: Central Macedonia
- Regional unit: Thessaloniki
- Municipality: Volvi
- Municipal unit: Apollonia
- Community: Peristerona
- Elevation: 90 m (300 ft)

Population (2021)
  - Total: 24
- Time zone: UTC+2 (EET)
  - Summer (DST): UTC+3 (EEST)
- Postal code: 570 20
- Area code: +30-2393
- Vehicle registration: NA to NX

Spitakia (Greek: Σπιτάκια, [spi'taca]) is a village of the Volvi municipality. Before the 2011 local government reform it was part of the municipality of Apollonia. The 2021 census recorded 24 inhabitants in the village. Spitakia is a part of the community of Peristerona.

== See also ==
- List of settlements in the Thessaloniki regional unit
