= Mesopotamo, Thessaloniki =

Village in Central Macedonia, Greece

Mesopotamo Μεσοπόταμο
- Settlement
- Location within Greece
- Coordinates: 40°36.8′N 23°26.4′E
- Country: Greece
- Administrative region: Central Macedonia
- Regional unit: Thessaloniki
- Municipality: Volvi
- Municipal unit: Apollonia
- Community: Nea Apollonia
- Elevation: 115 m (377 ft)

Population (2021)
  - Total: 10
- Time zone: UTC+2 (EET)
  - Summer (DST): UTC+3 (EEST)
- Postal code: 570 15
- Area code: +30-2393
- Vehicle registration: NA to NX

Mesopotamo (Greek: Μεσοπόταμο, [meso'potamo]) is a village of the Volvi municipality. Before the 2011 local government reform it was part of the municipality of Apollonia. The 2011 census recorded 10 inhabitants in the village. Mesopotamo is a part of the community of Nea Apollonia.

== See also ==
- List of settlements in the Thessaloniki regional unit
