= Vrasna =

Village in Central Macedonia, Greece

Vrasna Βρασνά
- Community

- Location within Greece
- Coordinates: 40°42.3′N 23°39.1′E
- Country: Greece
- Administrative region: Central Macedonia
- Regional unit: Thessaloniki
- Municipality: Volvi
- Municipal unit: Agios Georgios

Area
  - Community: 41.127 km^{2} (15.879 sq mi)
- Elevation: 5 m (16 ft)

Population (2021)
  - Community: 2,276
  - Density: 55.34/km^{2} (143.3/sq mi)
- Time zone: UTC+2 (EET)
  - Summer (DST): UTC+3 (EEST)
- Postal code: 570 21
- Area code: +30-2397
- Vehicle registration: NA to NX

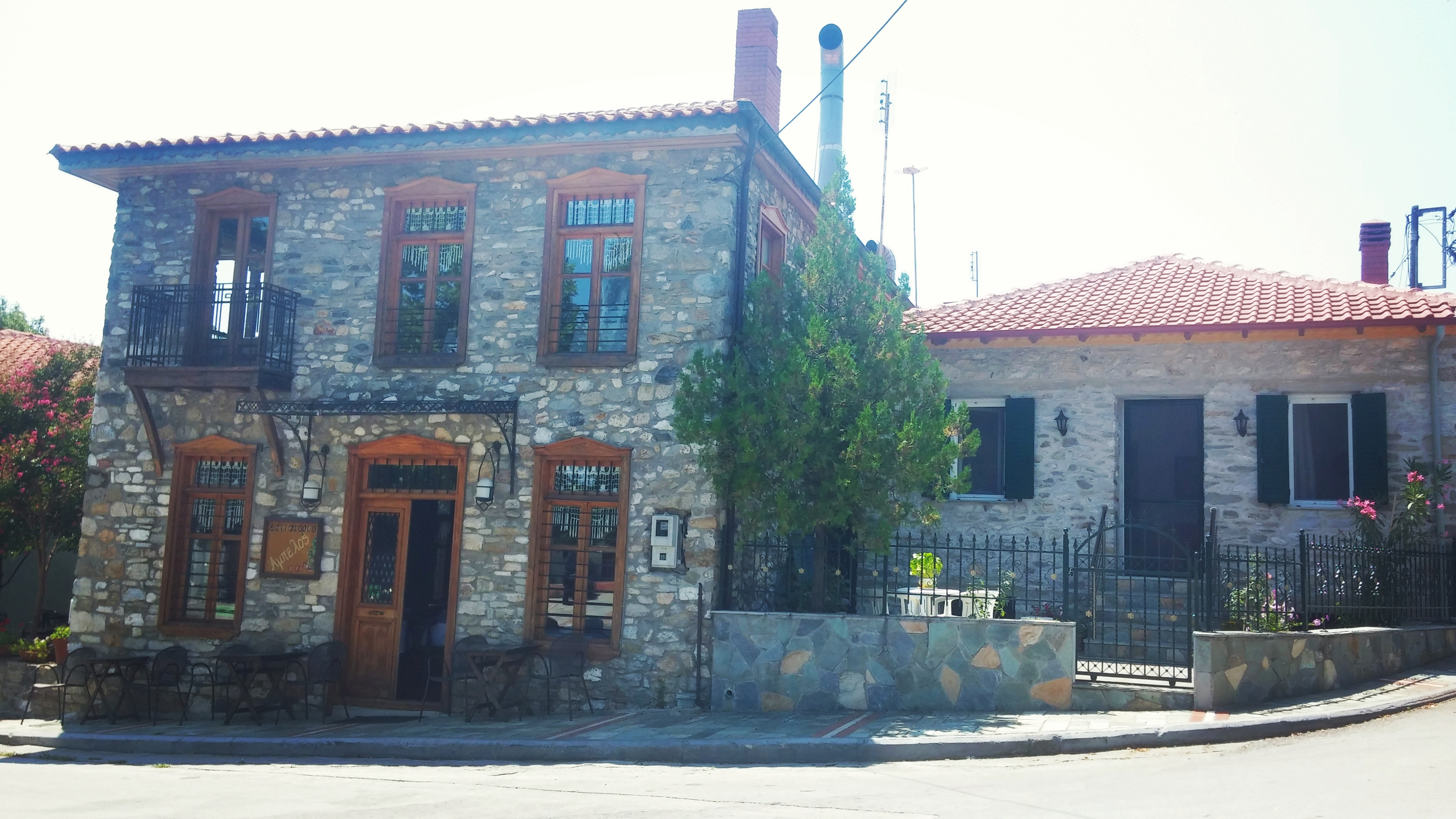
Vrasna Central Square

Vrasna (Greek: Βρασνά, Vrasná [vɾas'na]) is a village and a community of the Volvi municipality. Before the 2011 local government reform it was part of the municipality of Agios Georgios. The community of Vrasna covers an area of 41.127 km^{2}.

According to the statistics of Vasil Kanchov ("Macedonia, Ethnography and Statistics"), 850 Greek Christians lived in the village in 1900.

== Administrative division ==
The community of Vrasna consists of three settlements:

- Nea Vrasna
- Paliampela
- Vrasna

== Population ==
Year	Population
2001	2,275
2011	2,879
2021	2,276

== See also ==
- List of settlements in the Thessaloniki regional unit
