= Xiropotamos, Thessaloniki =

Xiropotamos Ξηροπόταμος
- Settlement
- Location within Greece
- Coordinates: 40°45.7′N 23°29′E
- Country: Greece
- Administrative region: Central Macedonia
- Regional unit: Thessaloniki
- Municipality: Volvi
- Municipal unit: Arethousa
- Community: Filadelfio
- Elevation: 360 m (1,180 ft)

Population (2021)
  - Total: 248
- Time zone: UTC+2 (EET)
  - Summer (DST): UTC+3 (EEST)
- Postal code: 570 16
- Area code: +30-2395
- Vehicle registration: NA to NX

Xiropotamos (Greek: Ξηροπόταμος, [ksiɾo'potamos]) is a village of the Volvi municipality. Before the 2011 local government reform it was part of the municipality of Arethousa. The 2021 census recorded 248 inhabitants in the village. Xiropotamos is a part of the community of Filadelfio.

== Notable people ==
- Charalambos Makridis

== See also ==
- List of settlements in the Thessaloniki regional unit
