= Megali Volvi =

Village in Central Macedonia, Greece

Megali Volvi Μεγάλη Βόλβη
- Settlement

- Location within Greece
- Coordinates: 40°41.7′N 23°25.6′E
- Country: Greece
- Administrative region: Central Macedonia
- Regional unit: Thessaloniki
- Municipality: Volvi
- Municipal unit: Rentina
- Community: Volvi
- Elevation: 45 m (148 ft)

Population (2021)
  - Total: 101
- Time zone: UTC+2 (EET)
  - Summer (DST): UTC+3 (EEST)
- Postal code: 570 14
- Area code: +30-2397
- Vehicle registration: NA to NX

Megali Volvi (Greek: Μεγάλη Βόλβη) is a village of the Volvi municipality. Before the 2011 local government reform it was part of the municipality of Rentina. The 2021 census recorded 101 inhabitants in the village. Megali Volvi is a part of the community of Volvi.

== See also ==
- List of settlements in the Thessaloniki regional unit
