= Volvi, Thessaloniki =

Volvi Βόλβη
- Community
- Location within Greece
- Coordinates: 40°40.6′N 23°33.6′E
- Country: Greece
- Administrative region: Central Macedonia
- Regional unit: Thessaloniki
- Municipality: Volvi
- Municipal unit: Rentina

Area
  - Community: 92.77 km^{2} (35.82 sq mi)
- Elevation: 58 m (190 ft)

Population (2021)
  - Community: 844
  - Density: 9.10/km^{2} (23.6/sq mi)
- Time zone: UTC+2 (EET)
  - Summer (DST): UTC+3 (EEST)
- Postal code: 570 14
- Area code: +30-2397
- Vehicle registration: NA to NX

Volvi (Greek: Βόλβη) is a community in the Volvi municipality. Before the 2011 local government reform it was part of the municipality of Rentina, of which it was a municipal district. The 2021 census recorded 844 inhabitants in the community. The community of Volvi covers an area of 92.77 km^{2}.

== Administrative division ==
The community of Volvi consists of four separate settlements:

- Megali Volvi (population 101 as of 2021)
- Mikra Volvi (population 478)
- Rentina (population 115)
- Vamvakia (population 150)

== See also ==
- List of settlements in the Thessaloniki regional unit
