= Asprovalta =

Town in Central Macedonia, Greece

Asprovalta Ασπροβάλτα
- Community
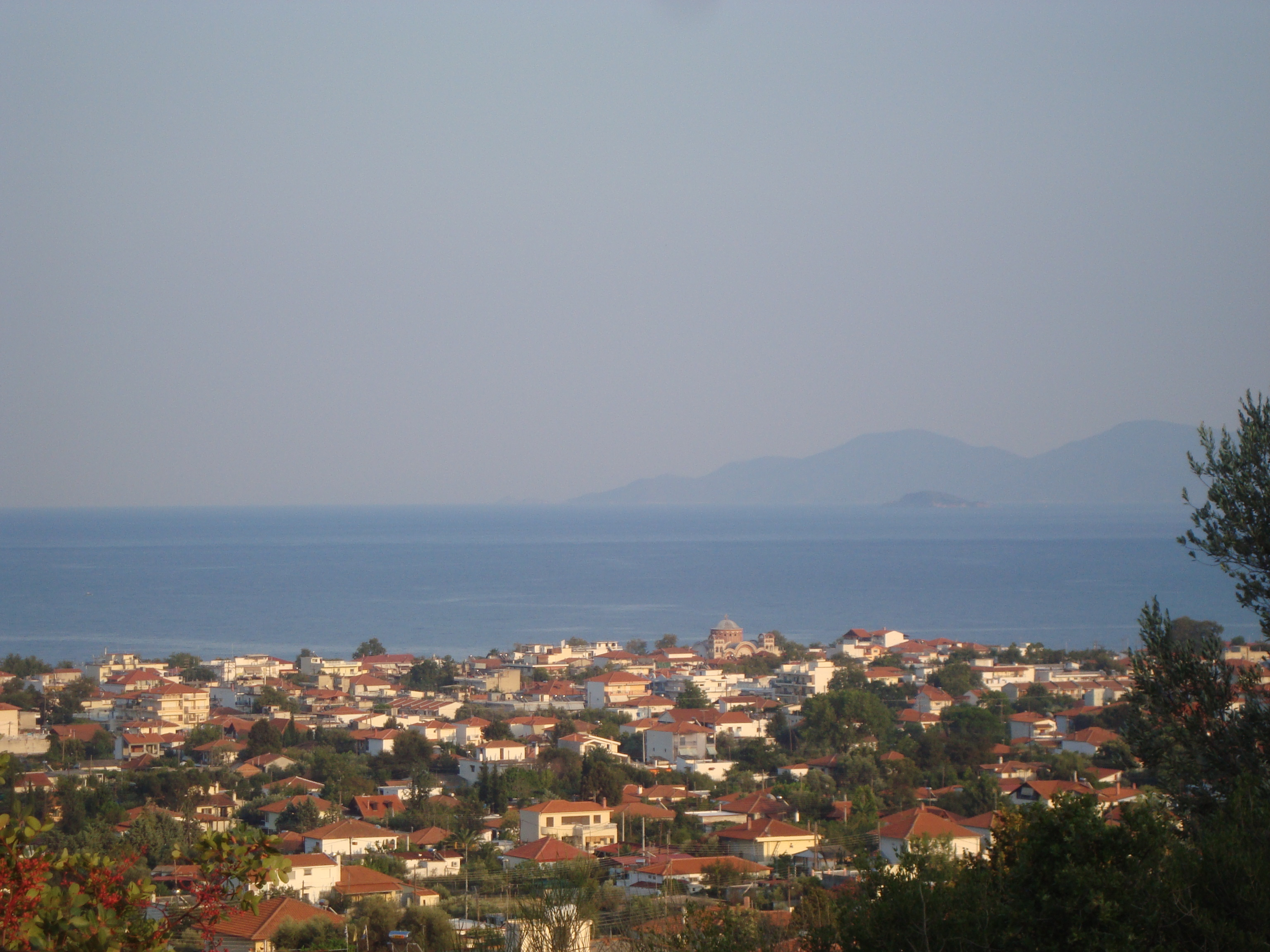

- Location within the regional unit

- Location within Greece
- Coordinates: 40°43′N 23°42′E
- Country: Greece
- Administrative region: Central Macedonia
- Regional unit: Thessaloniki
- Municipality: Volvi
- Municipal unit: Agios Georgios

Population (2021)
  - Community: 2,405
- Time zone: UTC+2 (EET)
  - Summer (DST): UTC+3 (EEST)
- Postal code: 57021

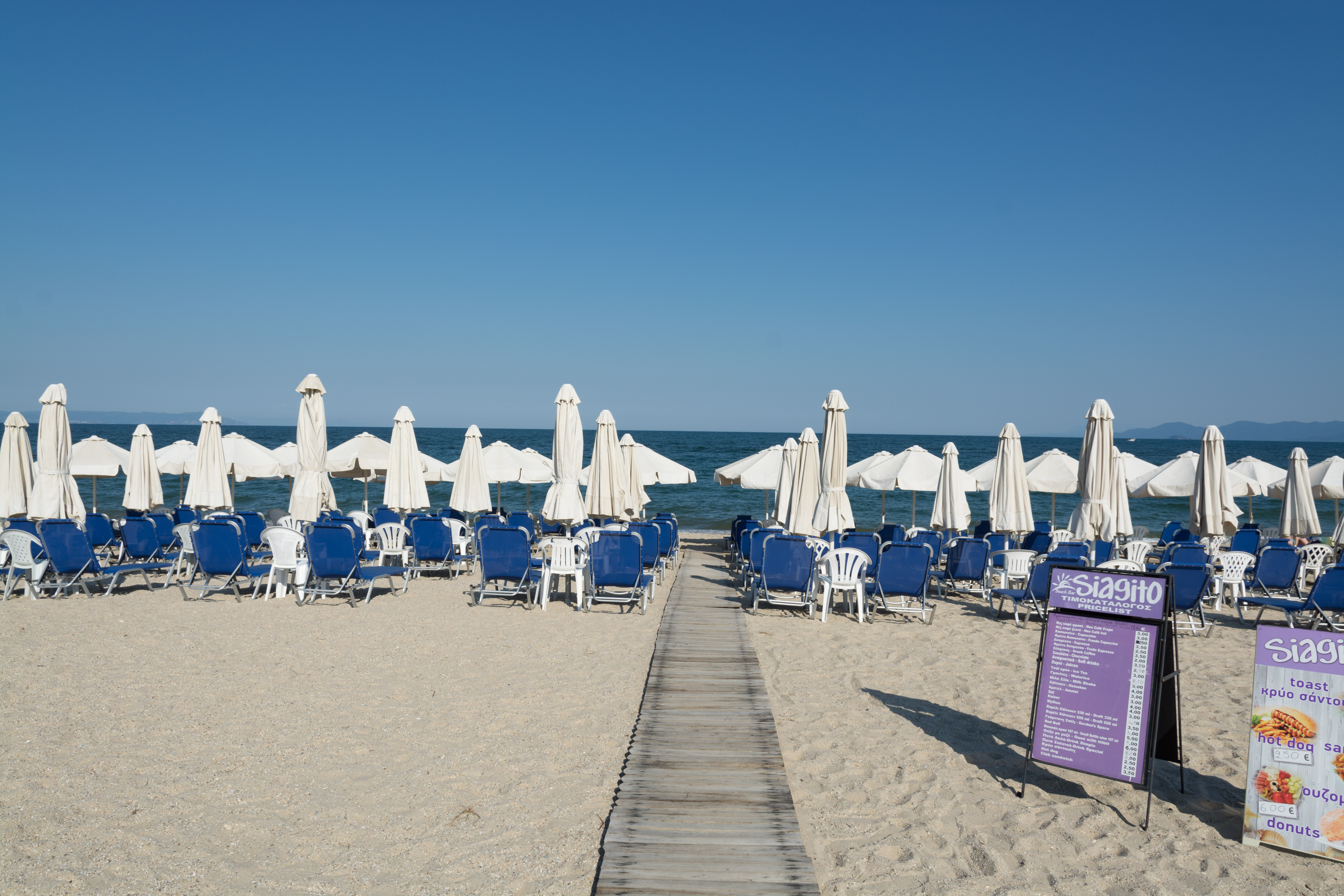
A beach in Asprovalta

Asprovalta (Greek: Ασπροβάλτα, Asproválta) is a town in the Thessaloniki regional unit of northern Greece. It was formerly the seat of the Agios Georgios municipality. Since the implementation of the Kallikratis Plan in January 2011, Asprovalta has belonged to the Municipality of Volvi.

== History ==
Near the modern town lie the ruins of a Roman station of the Via Egnatia known as Pennana. A manuscript of the Simonopetra monastery on Mount Athos records that Asprovalta was founded in the 16th century under the name Aspra Valta.

Following the Asia Minor Disaster, 54 families from Erenköy in the Troad (near ancient Ophryneion) were resettled in Asprovalta. During World War I, Erenköy had hosted a Turkish artillery unit and was bombarded by Allied naval forces. After the Armistice of Mudros (30 October 1918), many inhabitants of Erenköy were dispersed to settlements across Greece, including Athens, Lamia, Kymi, Kalamata, Tripoli, Argos, Halkida, and Crete. Most, however, eventually established themselves in Asprovalta, Kato Lakkovikia (later renamed "Ofrenio" in memory of the ancient village), and the Nicaea quarter of Piraeus.

In September 1923, 54 refugee families from Erenköy, having fled via the island of Imvros, arrived in Stavros aboard the ship Elpidoforos.

=== Refugee testimonies ===
Accounts recorded from refugees describe the circumstances of their displacement and resettlement. One survivor, Konstantinos Epitropou, recalled that in 1915 residents were ordered to evacuate to Karantina, from where Greek ships such as the Granikos and Varvára transported groups to mainland ports. Some families were taken to Almyros, while others, including his own, were landed at Piraeus, with part of the group continuing to Kalamata. They remained there for about five years before resettlement in Macedonia.

Another refugee, Eleni Dialogi-Petraki, recounted that the persecution came without warning, shortly after the grape harvest. Families were told to leave town the following morning, and some, like her father, initially assumed the departure would be temporary. Refugees first gathered at Karantina, then moved to Krithia, where makeshift shacks were constructed. Later they chartered boats to Imbros, but finding the island under Turkish control, they relocated once more to Asprovalta. Initial housing there consisted of shacks and tents until more permanent dwellings could be built.

== Climate ==
Asprovalta enjoys a sunny and warm Mediterranean climate (Köppen: Csa). Winter highs are around 12 °C (54 °F) while summer highs are around 32 °C (90 °F).

Climate data for Asprovalta
Month	Jan	Feb	Mar	Apr	May	Jun	Jul	Aug	Sep	Oct	Nov	Dec	Year
Record high °C (°F)	21.7 (71.1)	20.3 (68.5)	24.3 (75.7)	29.7 (85.5)	32.9 (91.2)	36.3 (97.3)	40.0 (104.0)	41.8 (107.2)	38.4 (101.1)	30.9 (87.6)	26.4 (79.5)	20.2 (68.4)	41.8 (107.2)
Mean daily maximum °C (°F)	11.1 (52.0)	12.8 (55.0)	15.3 (59.5)	19.6 (67.3)	24.2 (75.6)	28.9 (84.0)	32.3 (90.1)	32.5 (90.5)	27.8 (82.0)	21.7 (71.1)	17 (63)	12.5 (54.5)	21.3 (70.4)
Daily mean °C (°F)	7 (45)	8.8 (47.8)	10.9 (51.6)	14.6 (58.3)	18.9 (66.0)	23.5 (74.3)	26.9 (80.4)	27.1 (80.8)	22.7 (72.9)	17.2 (63.0)	13.1 (55.6)	8.7 (47.7)	16.6 (62.0)
Mean daily minimum °C (°F)	3 (37)	4.7 (40.5)	6.5 (43.7)	9.5 (49.1)	13.7 (56.7)	18.1 (64.6)	21.5 (70.7)	21.7 (71.1)	17.7 (63.9)	12.7 (54.9)	9.1 (48.4)	4.9 (40.8)	11.9 (53.4)
Record low °C (°F)	−8.0 (17.6)	−4.1 (24.6)	−3.2 (26.2)	1.2 (34.2)	9.2 (48.6)	10.9 (51.6)	15.4 (59.7)	17.2 (63.0)	8.8 (47.8)	5.4 (41.7)	0.3 (32.5)	−4.3 (24.3)	−8.0 (17.6)
Average rainfall mm (inches)	74.3 (2.93)	51.3 (2.02)	75.8 (2.98)	45.6 (1.80)	37.5 (1.48)	56.6 (2.23)	27.5 (1.08)	15.6 (0.61)	36 (1.4)	56.5 (2.22)	78.4 (3.09)	81.4 (3.20)	636.5 (25.04)
Source: National Observatory of Athens (Dec 2012 - Nov 2025), Asprovalta N.O.A station

== Historical population ==
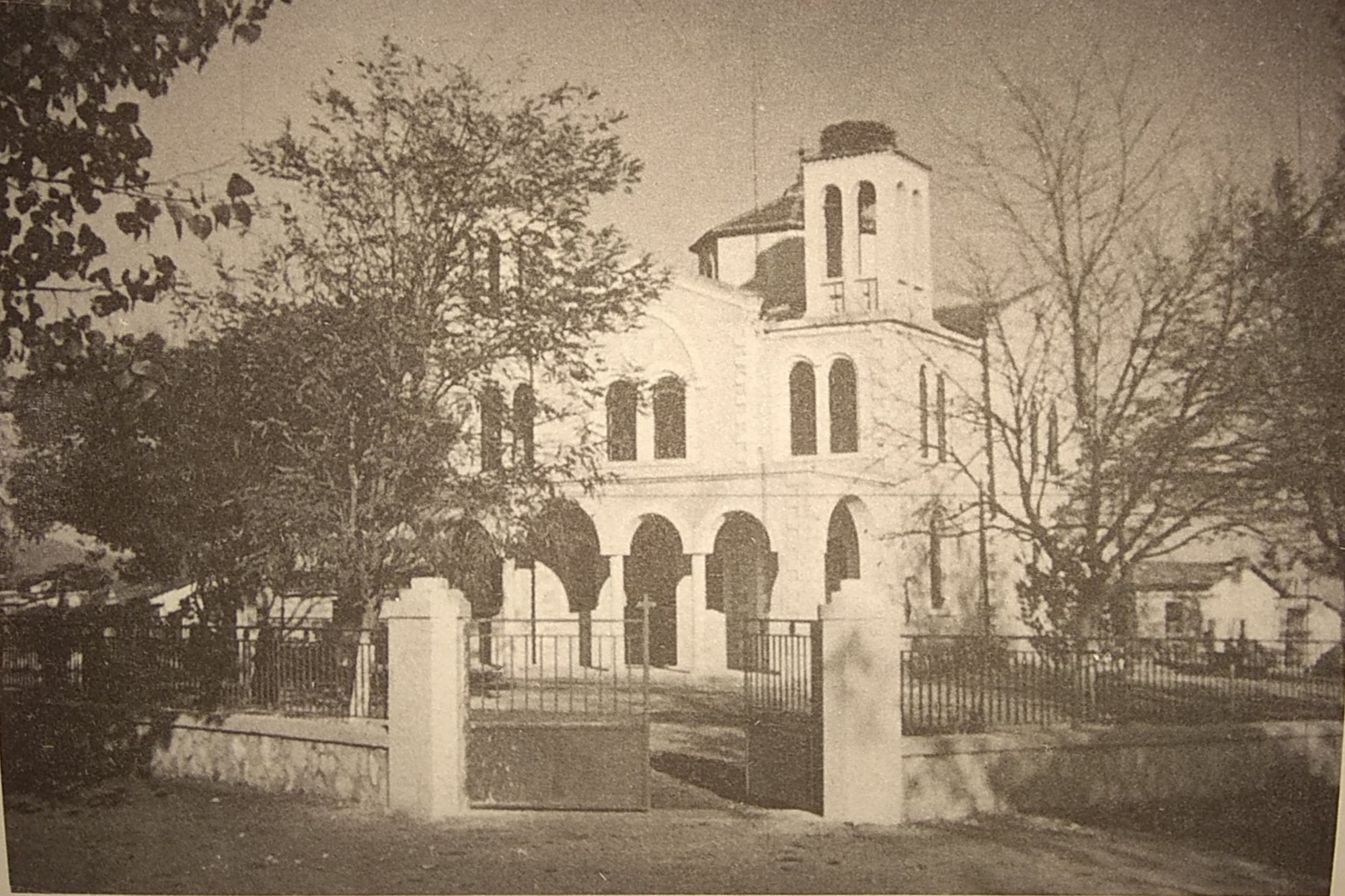
The first church built by the refugees from Erenköy, 1927–1928

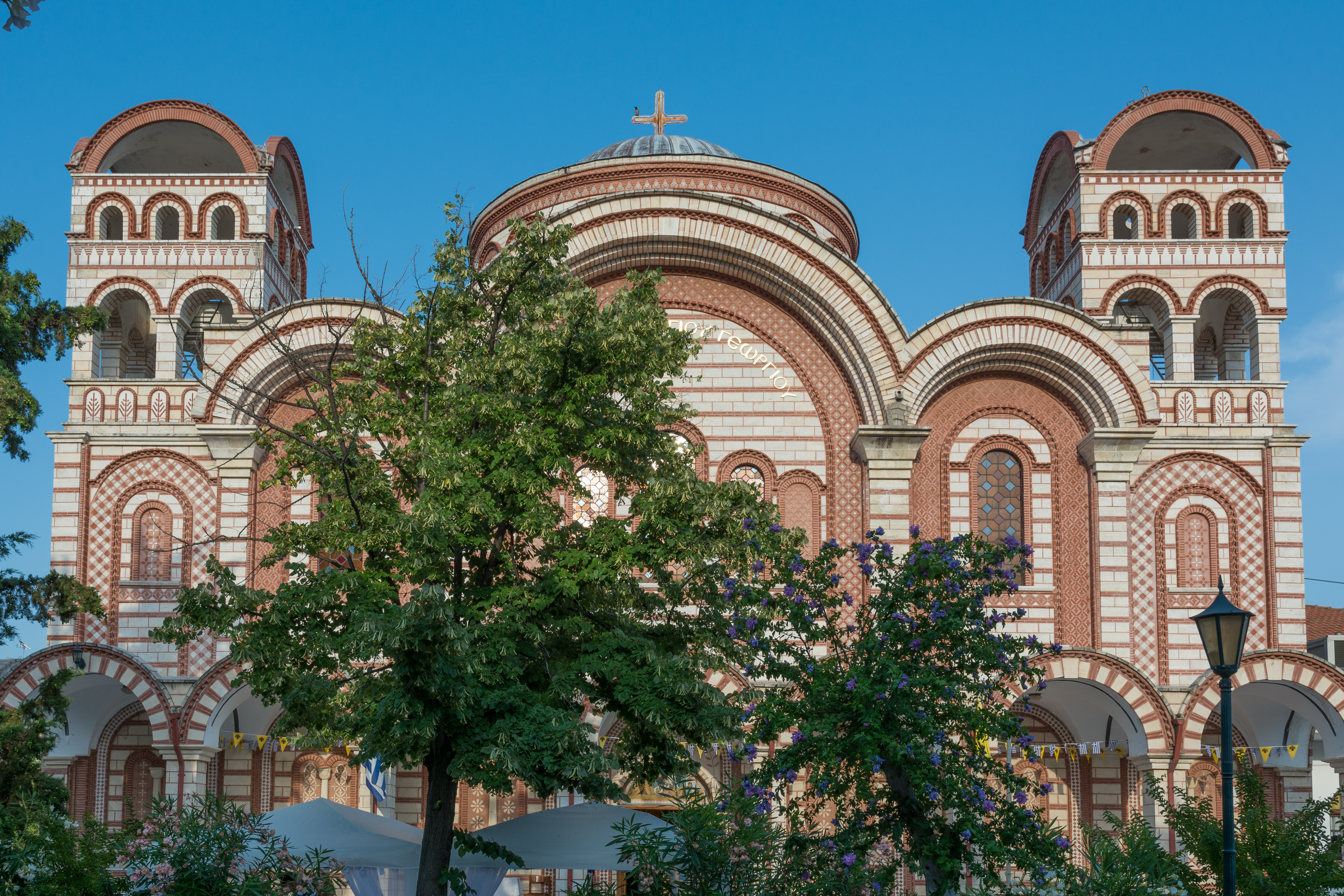
The later St George Church, built in 1978

Census	Population
1991	2,366
2001	2,997
2011	2,838
2021	2,405

== Landmarks ==
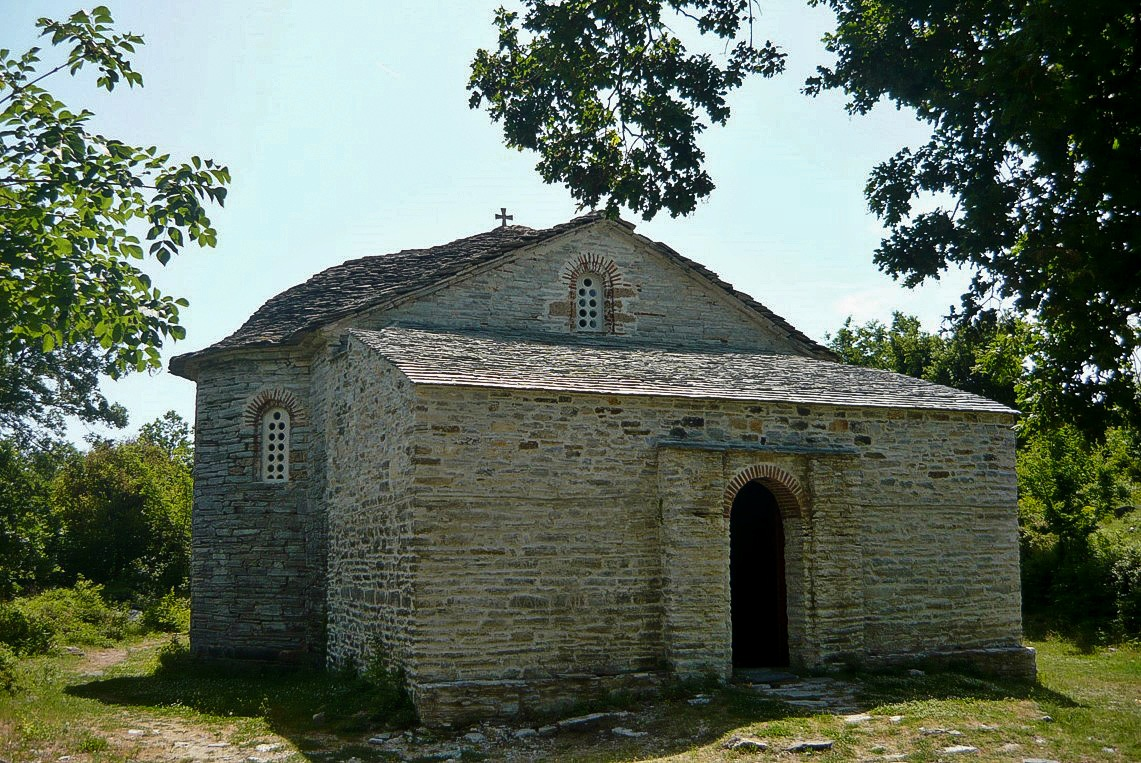
Agios Georgios Church in the Kerdylia Mountains, 16th century

The first Church of Saint George was constructed between 1927 and 1928 by refugees from Erenköy. Prior to its construction, the Divine Liturgy was celebrated in a temporary shack, and religious artefacts were stored in private homes. This original church was demolished in 1978 during a period of tourism development, and a larger cement structure was erected in its place. The new church preserves several heirlooms brought by the Asia Minor refugees, including two icons of St. George and the Virgin Mary dating to the 16th–17th centuries, an icon of St. Nicholas, two gold-embroidered icons, and the former parish school library.

A second church dedicated to St. George, dating from the mid-16th century, is located in the Kerdylia Mountains. It follows the monastic architectural style of Ottoman-era Macedonia, which preserved features of Byzantine ecclesiastical design. The church is of the Athonite cruciform-inscribed type, characterized by side niches for the psalters and a spacious narthex (litti). The central area is roofed with a large, well-executed cross vault.
