= Arethusa (Mygdonia) =

Town in ancient Macedonia

Coordinates: 40°39′23″N 23°37′24″E

Arethusa or Arethousa (Ancient Greek: Ἀρέθουσα) was a town of Bisaltia (or of easternmost Mygdonia) in ancient Macedonia, in the pass of Aulon, north of Stageira, near to Bolbe Lake, Rhechius river and a little north of Bromiscus, and celebrated for containing the sepulchre of Euripides. We learn from the Periplus of Pseudo-Scylax (100.67) that it was an ancient Greek colony. It was probably founded by the Chalcidians of Euboea, who may have called it after the celebrated fountain in the neighbourhood of their city. Stephanus of Byzantium erroneously calls it a city of Thrace. It was either from this place or Bromiscus that the fortified town of Rentine arose, which is frequently mentioned by the Byzantine historians.

Its site is near the modern Rentina.
