= Apollonia, Madytos =

Village in Central Macedonia, Greece

Apollonia Απολλωνία
- Community
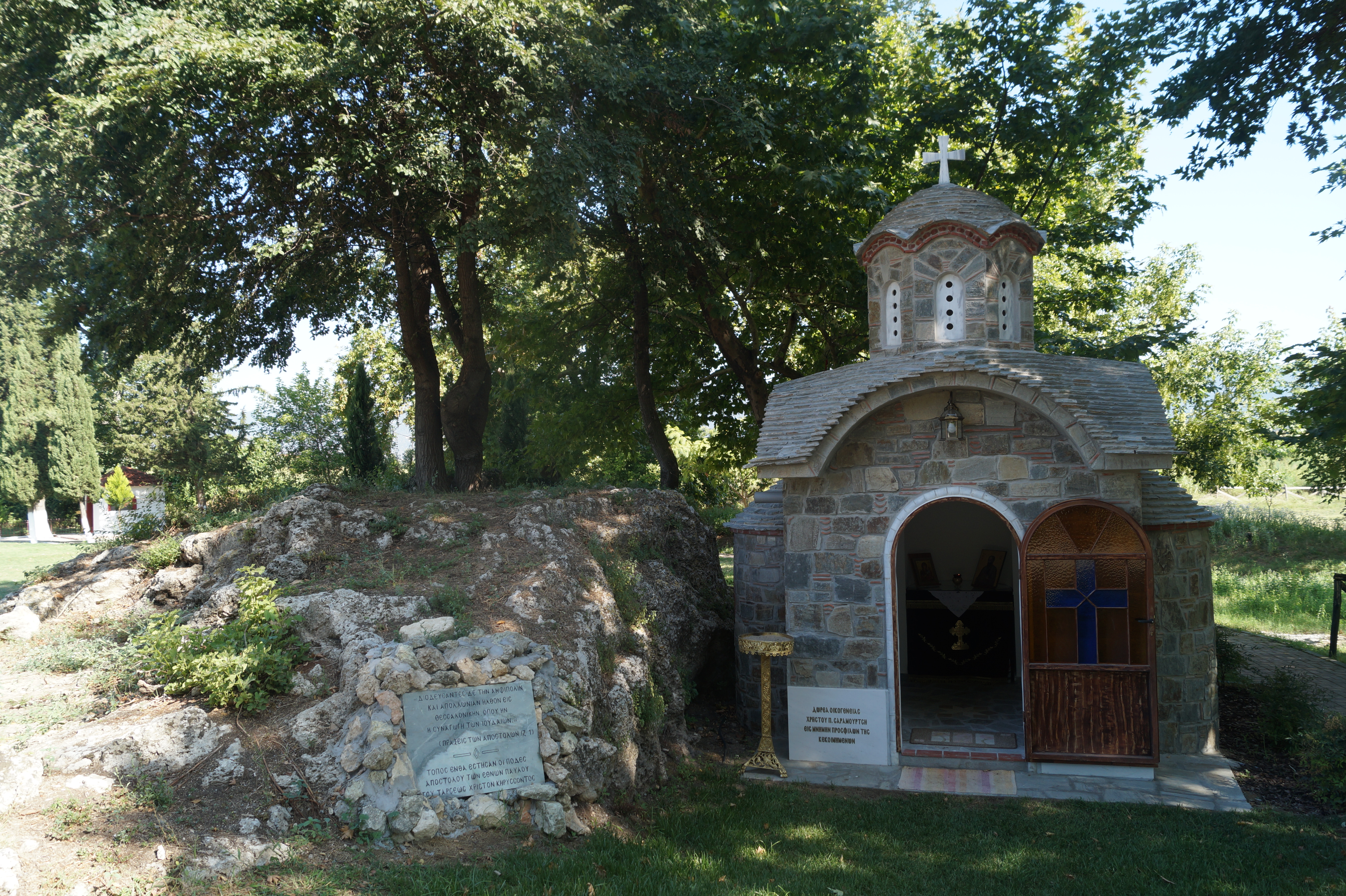
- The church of Agios Pavlos in Apollonia

- Location within Greece
- Coordinates: 40°38.4′N 23°29.3′E
- Country: Greece
- Administrative region: Central Macedonia
- Regional unit: Thessaloniki
- Municipality: Volvi
- Municipal unit: Madytos

Area
  - Community: 32.70 km^{2} (12.63 sq mi)
- Elevation: 65 m (213 ft)

Population (2021)
  - Community: 350
  - Density: 11/km^{2} (28/sq mi)
- Time zone: UTC+2 (EET)
  - Summer (DST): UTC+3 (EEST)
- Postal code: 570 20
- Area code: +30-2393
- Vehicle registration: NA to NX

Apollonia (Greek: Απολλωνία) is a village and a community of the Volvi municipality. Before the 2011 local government reform it was part of the municipality of Madytos, of which it was a municipal district. The 2021 census recorded 350 inhabitants in the community. The community of Apollonia covers an area of 32.70 km^{2}.

== Administrative division ==
The community of Apollonia consists of two separate settlements (2021 populations):

- Apollonia (population 265)
- Kokkalou (population 85)

== See also ==
- List of settlements in the Thessaloniki regional unit
