= Lefkouda =

Village in Greece

Lefkouda Λευκούδα
- Settlement

- Location within Greece
- Coordinates: 40°44.2′N 23°32.7′E
- Country: Greece
- Administrative region: Central Macedonia
- Regional unit: Thessaloniki
- Municipality: Volvi
- Municipal unit: Arethousa
- Community: Arethousa

Population (2021)
  - Total: 72
- Time zone: UTC+2 (EET)
  - Summer (DST): UTC+3 (EEST)
- Postal code: 570 02
- Area code: +30-2395
- Vehicle registration: NA to NX

Lefkouda (Greek: Λευκούδα, [le'fkuða]) is a village of the Volvi municipality in Greece. Before the 2011 local government reform it was part of the municipality of Arethousa. The 2021 census recorded 72 inhabitants in the village. Lefkouda is a part of the community of Arethousa.

== See also ==
- List of settlements in the Thessaloniki regional unit
