= Nea Apollonia =

Village in Central Macedonia, Greece

Nea Apollonia Νέα Απολλωνία
- Community
- Location within Greece
- Coordinates: 40°37.5′N 23°26.4′E
- Country: Greece
- Administrative region: Central Macedonia
- Regional unit: Thessaloniki
- Municipality: Volvi
- Municipal unit: Apollonia

Area
  - Community: 70.855 km^{2} (27.357 sq mi)
- Elevation: 107 m (351 ft)

Population (2021)
  - Community: 1,652
  - Density: 23.32/km^{2} (60.39/sq mi)
- Time zone: UTC+2 (EET)
  - Summer (DST): UTC+3 (EEST)
- Postal code: 570 15
- Area code: +30-2393
- Vehicle registration: NA to NX

Nea Apollonia (Greek: Νέα Απολλωνία) is a village and a community of the Volvi municipality. Before the 2011 local government reform it was part of the municipality of Apollonia, of which it was a municipal district. The 2021 census recorded 1,652 inhabitants in the community. The community of Nea Apollonia covers an area of 70.855 km^{2}.

== Administrative division ==
The community of Nea Apollonia consists of three separate settlements:

- Loutra Volvis (population 70 as of 2021)
- Mesopotamo (population 10)
- Nea Apollonia (population 1,572)

== See also ==
- List of settlements in the Thessaloniki regional unit
