= Chrysostomos I =

Chrysostomos I (Greek: Χρυσόστομος Α΄) can refer to:

- Chrysostomos I of Athens (1868–1938), Archbishop of Athens and All Greece, 1923–1938
- Chrysostomos I of Cyprus (1927–2007), Archbishop of Cyprus, 1977–2007
