= Kokkalou =

Kokkalou Κοκκαλού
- Settlement
- Location within Greece
- Coordinates: 40°37.5′N 23°29.6′E
- Country: Greece
- Administrative region: Central Macedonia
- Regional unit: Thessaloniki
- Municipality: Volvi
- Municipal unit: Madytos
- Community: Apollonia
- Elevation: 70 m (230 ft)

Population (2021)
  - Total: 85
- Time zone: UTC+2 (EET)
  - Summer (DST): UTC+3 (EEST)
- Postal code: 570 20
- Area code: +30-2393
- Vehicle registration: NA to NX

Kokkalou (Greek: Κοκκαλού, [koka'lu]) is a village of the Volvi municipality. Before the 2011 local government reform it was part of the municipality of Madytos. The 2021 census recorded 85 inhabitants in the village. Kokkalou is a part of the community of Apollonia.

== See also ==
- List of settlements in the Thessaloniki regional unit
