= Profitis =

Profitis Προφήτης
- Community
- Location within Greece
- Coordinates: 40°41.2′N 23°16.7′E
- Country: Greece
- Administrative region: Central Macedonia
- Regional unit: Thessaloniki
- Municipality: Volvi
- Municipal unit: Egnatia

Area
  - Community: 48.806 km^{2} (18.844 sq mi)
- Elevation: 141 m (463 ft)

Population (2021)
  - Community: 870
  - Density: 18/km^{2} (46/sq mi)
- Time zone: UTC+2 (EET)
  - Summer (DST): UTC+3 (EEST)
- Postal code: 572 00
- Area code: +30-2393
- Vehicle registration: NA to NX

Profitis (Greek: Προφήτης) is a village and a community of the Volvi municipality. Before the 2011 local government reform, it was part of the municipality of Egnatia, of which it was a municipal district. The 2021 census recorded 870 inhabitants in the community. The community of Profitis covers an area of 48.806 km^{2}.

According to the statistics of Vasil Kanchov ("Macedonia, Ethnography and Statistics"), 450 Greek Christians lived in the village in 1900.

== Administrative division ==
The community of Profitis consists of two separate settlements (2021 populations):

- Mikrokomi (population 51)
- Profitis (population 819)

== See also ==
- List of settlements in the Thessaloniki regional unit
