= Chrysostomos Lavriotis =

- Χρυσόστομος Λαυριώτης
- Born: 1856; Madytos, Eastern Thrace
- Died: 1908 (aged 51–52); Mount Athos
- Occupation: Abbot in Mount Athos

Chrysostomos Lavriotis (1856–1908) was an abbot of the Great Lavra on Mount Athos.

== Biography ==
Chrysostomos Lavriotis was born in the year 1856 in Madytos, Eastern Thrace. He moved with his father to Jerusalem and returned to his birthplace to complete his general education. He stayed for a short period in the cell "Annunciation of the Theotokos" in Karyes. He was sent by the Great Lavra to the Theological School of Halki, from which he graduated with honors. He returned to the Great Lavra and was appointed assistant and then Principal of the Athoniada School (1886–1889) and later secretary of the Holy Community (1889–1894). He was ordained presbyter by Patriarch Joachim III when he was Metropolitan of Thessaloniki. He was elected head-abbot (1897) and served the Lavra as Commissioner and Representative. He was a member of the educational brotherhood of Madytians and the Society of Medieval Studies of Constantinople.

== His murder ==
On his way to the Christmas celebration at the Great Lavra, on December 22, 1908, he was murdered at the borders of the I.M. Iviron. Regarding the reasons for his murder, his subordinate novice Alexander, who accompanied him, expressed the opinion that Chrysostomos was a victim of the Kelliotiko issue, i.e., the dependency of a large number of monks from the I.M. Great Lavra.

== Literary work ==
- Compiled a catalog of manuscripts of the brotherhood of Ioasaphites I. Skete of Kafsokalyvia
- Compiled services and set to music doxologies of various Saints George, Eustathius, Methodius, Maximus Kafsokalyvitis
- Compiled a catalog of manuscripts of Protaton-I.Holy Community
- Compiled a catalog of manuscripts of Codes I.M. Megisti Lavra.

== Sources ==
- Elder Pavlos Lavriotis, "Abbot Chrysostomos Lavriotis (1856-1908)" in: 7th International Scientific Symposium "Mount Athos in the years of liberation - Conference Proceedings, Thessaloniki, 2013, p. 119-129
