= Apollonia (Chalcidice) =

Ancient chief town of Chalcidice in Macedonia

Apollonia (Ancient Greek: Ἀπολλωνία) was the ancient chief town of Chalcidice in Macedonia, situated north of Olynthus, and a little south of the Chalcidian mountains. That this Apollonia is a different place from Apollonia in Mygdonia, appears from Xenophon, who describes the Chalcidian Apollonia as distant 10 to 12 miles (16 to 19 km) from Olynthus. It was probably this Apollonia that struck the beautiful Chalcidian coins, bearing on the obverse the head of Apollo, and on the reverse his lyre, with the legend Χαλκιδέων. Demosthenes claims that Apollonia was among the Greek cities destroyed by Philip II of Macedon, probably during his war against the Chalcidian League in 348 BCE when he also destroyed Olynthus.

== See also ==
- List of ancient Greek cities
