= Nea Madytos =

Village in Central Macedonia, Greece

Nea Madytos Νέα Μάδυτος
- Community
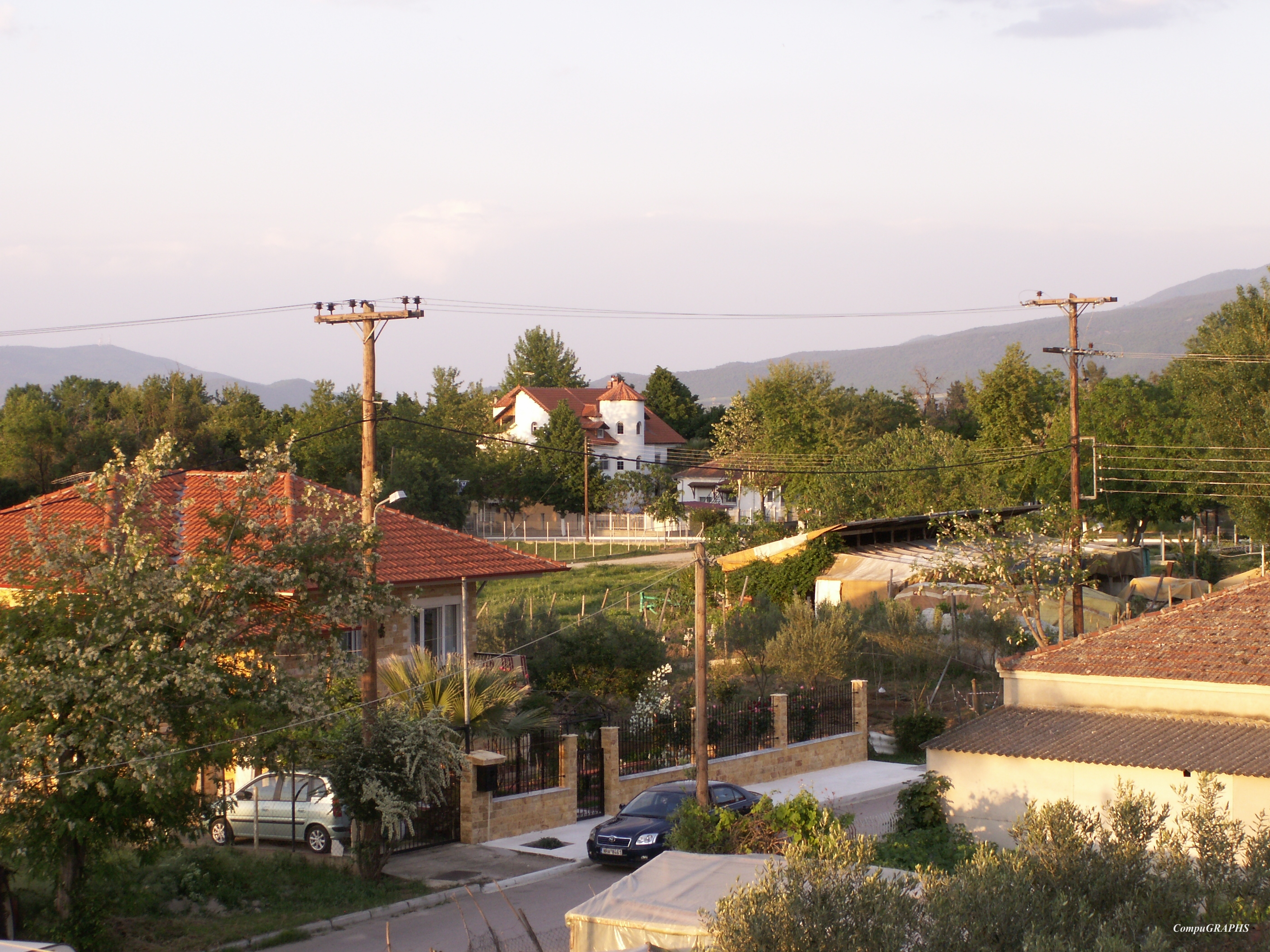

- Location within Greece
- Coordinates: 40°37.4′N 23°33.7′E
- Country: Greece
- Administrative region: Central Macedonia
- Regional unit: Thessaloniki
- Municipality: Volvi
- Municipal unit: Madytos

Area
  - Community: 34.705 km^{2} (13.400 sq mi)
- Elevation: 70 m (230 ft)

Population (2021)
  - Community: 1,369
  - Density: 39.45/km^{2} (102.2/sq mi)
- Time zone: UTC+2 (EET)
  - Summer (DST): UTC+3 (EEST)
- Postal code: 570 14
- Area code: +30-2397
- Vehicle registration: NA to NX

Nea Madytos (Greek: Νέα Μάδυτος) is a village and a community of the Volvi municipality in northern Greece. Before the 2011 local government reform it was part of the municipality of Madytos, of which it was a municipal district and the seat. The 2021 census recorded 1,369 inhabitants in the village. The community of Nea Madytos covers an area of 34.705 km^{2}.

It was founded in the mid-1920s by refugees originating from Madytos (present Eceabat, Turkey).

== See also ==
- List of settlements in the Thessaloniki regional unit
