= Rentina =

Rentina may refer to the following places in Greece:

- Rentina, Thessaloniki, a municipal unit in the Thessaloniki regional unit
- Rentina, Karditsa, a municipal unit in the Karditsa regional unit
