= Madytus =

Greek city and port of ancient Thrace

Coordinates: 40°11′07″N 26°21′23″E

Madytus or Madytos (Ancient Greek: Μάδυτος) was a Greek city and port of ancient Thrace, located in the region of the Thracian Chersonesos, nearly opposite to Abydos.

The city was a colony of the Aeolians from Lesbos who, according to the ancient authors, founded also Sestos and Alopekonessos and other cities of the Hellespont.

This was part of the Greek colonization movement of the 8th and 7th centuries BC. Later more colonists came from the Greek Ionian cities of Miletus and Clazomenae. Archaeological evidence also supports Aeolian or possibly Athenian origin of colonists.

Madytus is tied to Greek mythology as it claimed to have the tomb of Hecuba in its territory.

Madytus is referred to by Herodotus in relation to the Persian Wars, and by Xenophon as a base for the Athenian navy in 411. It was a member of the Delian League as attested by Athenian tribute registries between 445/4 and 421/0 BC. Bronze coins dated to the fourth century BC inscribed ΜΑΔΥ have been preserved.

Madytus was an active commercial port during the Byzantine period and the Middle Ages. It was occupied by the Ottoman Turks in the 15th century. The city continued to have a mainly Greek population until the 1920s when, after the Treaty of Lausanne and the exchange of population between Greece and Turkey, most of the Greeks moved to Greece, where they founded the town of Nea Madytos.

Its site is located near the modern Eceabat in European Turkey. Ptolemy mentions a town in the same district with the name of Madis, which some identify with Madytus, but which seems to have been situated more inland.

== Notable people ==
- Lazaros Sarantoglou
- Chrysostomos Lavriotis

== See also ==
- Greek colonies in Thrace

== Sources ==
- Külzer, Andreas (2008). Tabula Imperii Byzantini: Band 12, Ostthrakien (Eurōpē) (in German). Vienna: Österreichische Akademie der Wissenschaften. pp. 501–504. ISBN 978-3-7001-3945-4.
