= Chrysostomos I of Athens =

His Eminence Chrysostomos A
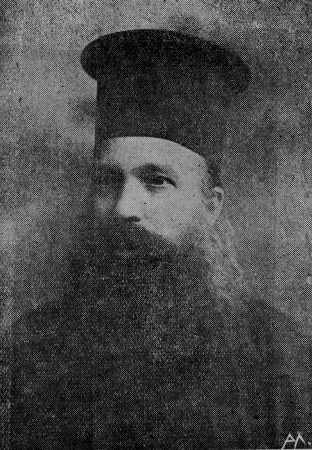
- Church: Greek Orthodox Church
- Installed: 31 December 1923
- Term ended: 22 October 1938

Personal details
- Born: Chrysostomos Papadopoulos (Χρυσόστομος Παπαδόπουλος); 1868 Madyta
- Died: 22 October 1938 (aged 69–70) Athens
- Denomination: Eastern Orthodox Christianity

Chrysostomos A (Greek: Χρυσόστομος Α΄; Madyta, 1868 – Athens, 22 October 1938), born Chrysostomos Papadopoulos (Χρυσόστομος Παπαδόπουλος), was Metropolitan of Athens from 8 March until 31 December 1923, when he became the first Archbishop of Athens and All Greece, serving until his death on 22 October 1938.
