= Stavros, Thessaloniki =

Town in Central Macedonia, Greece

Stavros Σταυρός
- Community
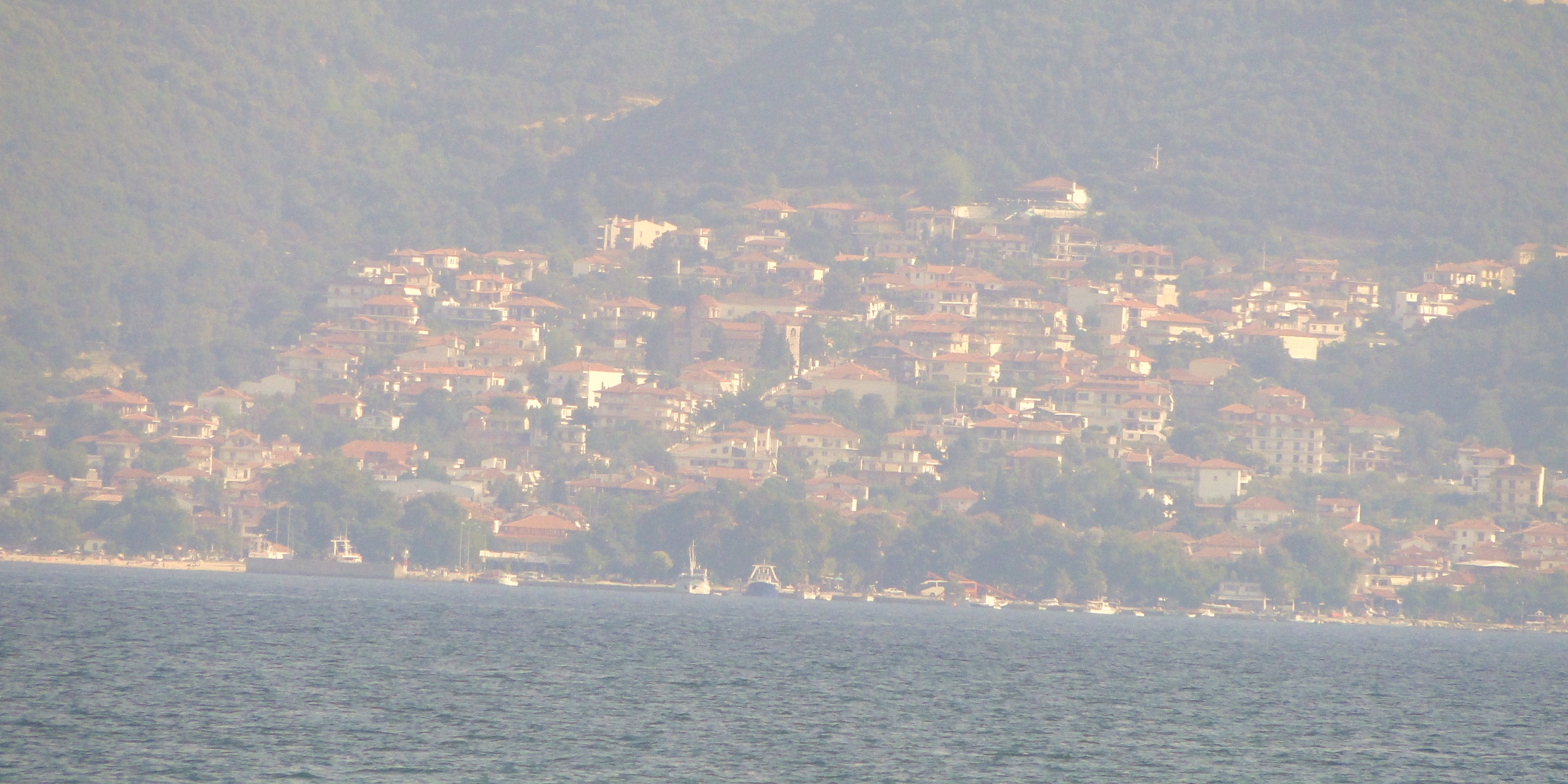
- The town beside the sea

- Location within Greece
- Coordinates: 40°39.9′N 23°41.8′E
- Country: Greece
- Administrative region: Central Macedonia
- Regional unit: Thessaloniki
- Municipality: Volvi
- Municipal unit: Rentina

Area
  - Community: 16.50 km^{2} (6.37 sq mi)
- Elevation: 10 m (33 ft)

Population (2021)
  - Community: 3,262
  - Density: 197.7/km^{2} (512.0/sq mi)
- Time zone: UTC+2 (EET)
  - Summer (DST): UTC+3 (EEST)
- Postal code: 570 14
- Area code: +30-2397
- Vehicle registration: NA to NX

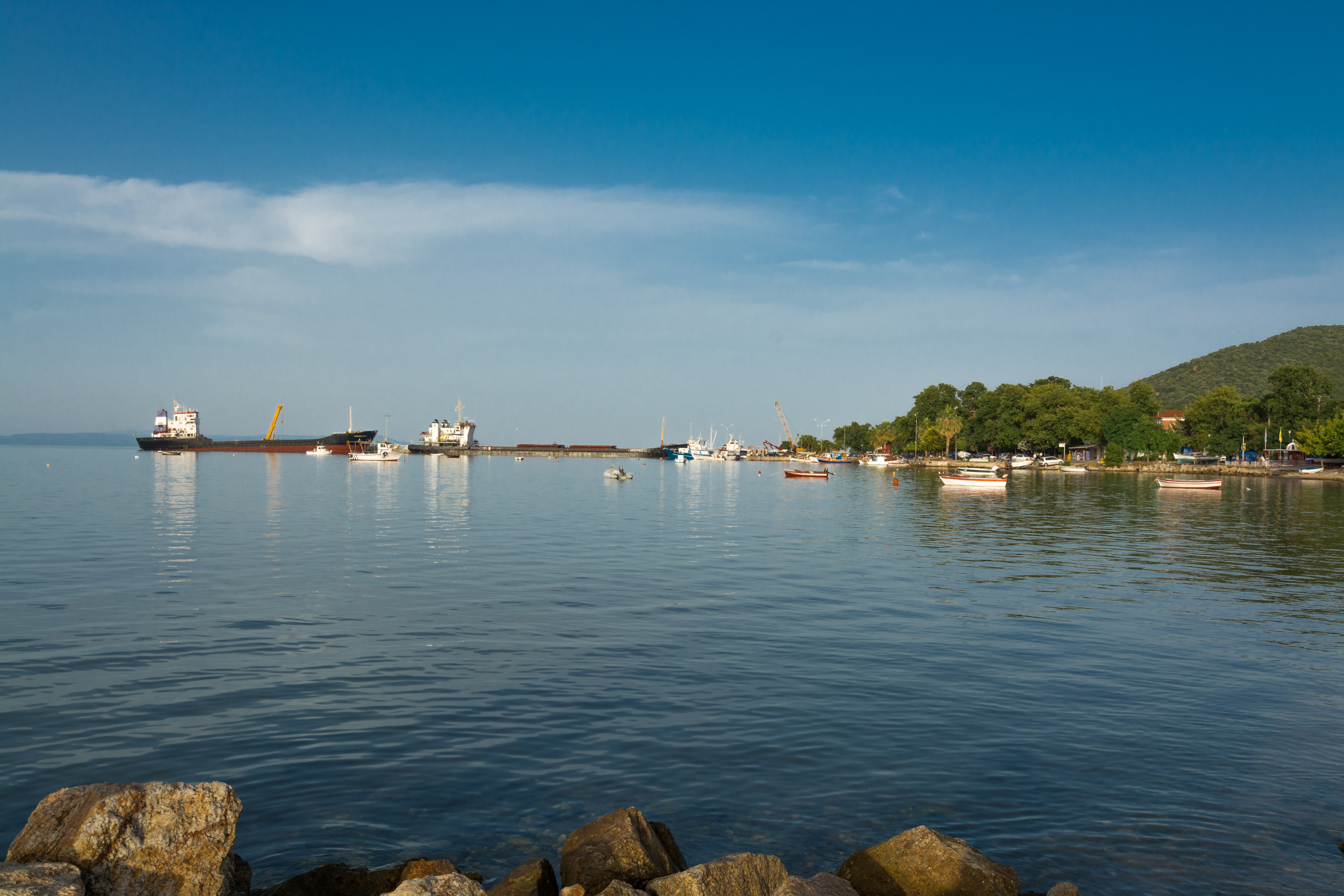
Volvi

Stavros (Greek: Σταυρός, Stavrós) is a town and a community of the Volvi municipality. Before the 2011 local government reform it was part of the municipality of Rentina, of which it was a municipal district. The 2021 census recorded 3,262 inhabitants in the town. The community of Stavros covers an area of 16.50 km^{2}.

== See also ==
- List of settlements in the Thessaloniki regional unit
