= Madytos =

Madytos Μάδυτος
- Municipal unit
- Location within the regional unit

- Location within Greece
- Coordinates: 40°37′N 23°34′E
- Country: Greece
- Administrative region: Central Macedonia
- Regional unit: Thessaloniki
- Municipality: Volvi

Area
  - Municipal unit: 89.909 km^{2} (34.714 sq mi)

Population (2021)
  - Municipal unit: 2,045
  - Municipal unit density: 22.75/km^{2} (58.91/sq mi)
- Time zone: UTC+2 (EET)
  - Summer (DST): UTC+3 (EEST)

Madytos (Greek: Μάδυτος) is a former municipality in the Thessaloniki regional unit, Greece. Since the 2011 local government reform it is part of the municipality Volvi, of which it is a municipal unit. Its population was 2,045 in 2021. The municipal unit has an area of 89.909 km^{2}. The seat of the municipality was in Nea Madytos. The town takes its name from the ancient Greek city of Madytus at the shore of Hellespont.
