= Agios Georgios, Thessaloniki =

Agios Georgios Άγιος Γεώργιος
- Municipal unit
- Location within the regional unit

- Location within Greece
- Coordinates: 40°43′N 23°41′E
- Country: Greece
- Administrative region: Central Macedonia
- Regional unit: Thessaloniki
- Municipality: Volvi

Area
  - Municipal unit: 65.866 km^{2} (25.431 sq mi)

Population (2021)
  - Municipal unit: 4,681
  - Municipal unit density: 71.07/km^{2} (184.1/sq mi)
- Time zone: UTC+2 (EET)
  - Summer (DST): UTC+3 (EEST)

Agios Georgios (Greek: Άγιος Γεώργιος) is a former municipality in the Thessaloniki regional unit, Greece. Since the 2011 local government reform it is part of the municipality Volvi, of which it is a municipal unit. Population 4,681 (2021). The municipal unit has an area of 65.866 km^{2}. The seat of the municipality was in Asprovalta.
