= Egnatia, Thessaloniki =

Egnatia Εγνατία
- Municipal unit
- Location within the regional unit

- Location within Greece
- Coordinates: 40°41′N 23°17′E
- Country: Greece
- Administrative region: Central Macedonia
- Regional unit: Thessaloniki
- Municipality: Volvi

Area
  - Municipal unit: 115.147 km^{2} (44.459 sq mi)
- Elevation: 121 m (397 ft)

Population (2021)
  - Municipal unit: 2,700
  - Municipal unit density: 23/km^{2} (61/sq mi)
- Time zone: UTC+2 (EET)
  - Summer (DST): UTC+3 (EEST)

Egnatia (Greek: Εγνατία) is a former municipality in the Thessaloniki regional unit, Greece. Since the 2011 local government reform it is part of the municipality Volvi, of which it is a municipal unit. The seat of the municipality was in Profitis. The municipal unit has an area of 115.147 km^{2}.
