= Lake Volvi =

Lake in Greece

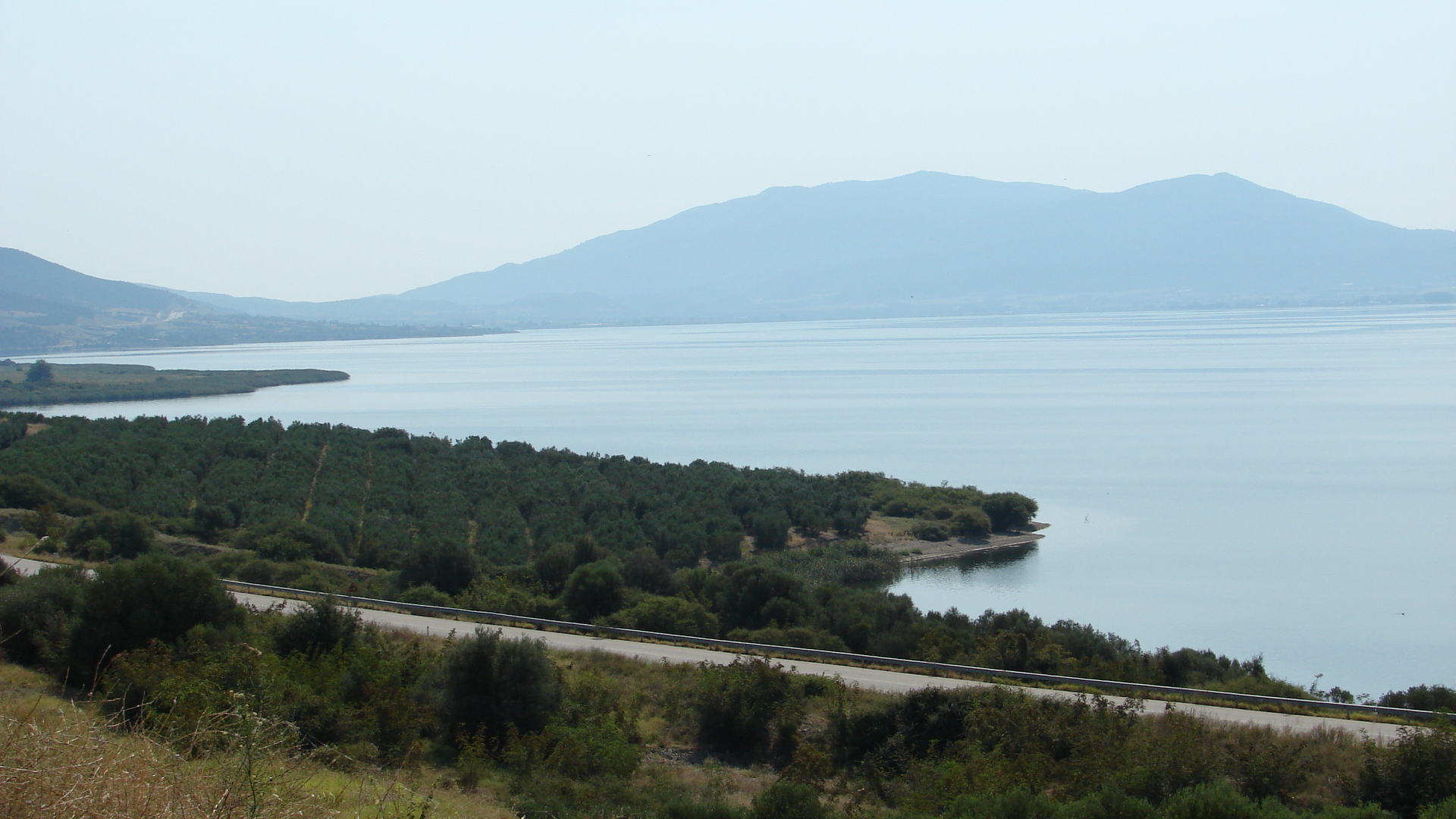
- Panoramic view

- Location within Greece
- Location: Thessaloniki regional unit
- Coordinates: 40°40′54″N 23°28′02″E
- Catchment area: 1,247 km^{2} (481 sq mi)
- Basin countries: Greece
- Max. length: 21.50 km (13.36 mi)
- Max. width: 6 km (3.7 mi)
- Surface area: 70 km^{2} (27 sq mi)
- Max. depth: 22.3 m (73 ft)
- Water volume: 0.94 km^{3} (0.23 cu mi)
- Surface elevation: 37 m (121 ft)

Ramsar Wetland
- Official name: Lakes Volvi & Koronia
- Designated: 21 August 1975
- Reference no.: 57

Lake Volvi (Greek: Λίμνη Βόλβη - Límni Vólvi) is located at the root of the Chalkidiki peninsula, in the Thessaloniki regional unit of Greece. It is the second largest lake in the country at 12 miles (19 km) length and 6 or 8 miles (9.7 or 12.9 km) width. Its area is 68 km² and its depth is 20 m. It is located east of Lake Koroneia (Lake Langadas).

The Via Egnatia Roman road runs along the northern shore of the lake, while a more ancient road ran along its southern one. On its east is the narrow valley of Rentina, also known as the "Macedonian Tempe". The municipalities of Volvi and Langadas have shoreline on the lake.

== History ==
About a million years ago, Lake Volvi, Lake Koroneia and the entire Mygdonia formed a single huge lake.

In the antique description by Thucydides, Bolbe was the name of a lake in Mygdonia, located near the Aegean Sea. The lake emptied itself into the Strymon Gulf by means of a stream flowing through the pass once known as Aulon or Arethusa. The name of the stream is not mentioned in the description, but it is evidently the Erechios (Romanized as Rechius) mentioned in scholar Procopius' work, De aedificiis. Among the smaller streams flowing into the lake, Ammites and Olynthiakos are also mentioned. The perch (labrach) of the lake were particularly admired by the gastronomic poet Archestratus.

Per Greek mythology, the lake goddess or nymph Bolbe dwelled in Lake Volvi.

During the Ottoman period, the lake was named بشيك كولى "Beşik Gölü" (lit. Cradle Lake) or "Besikia" (plural) in Greek.

Ottoman Turkish forces, led by Yusuf bey, killed hundreds of Greek inhabitants by drowning in the lake during the Greek war of independence.

There was also a town named Bolbos (Romanized as Bolbus) located near the lake. Today, there are two towns (villages) incorporating Vólvi in their name, situated along the lake. It is not known exactly if any of these modern towns correspond to the site of ancient Bolbos.

== See also ==
- List of lakes in Greece
- Mygdonia
