= Rentina, Thessaloniki =

Village in Central Macedonia, Greece

Rentina Ρεντίνα
- Municipal unit
- Location within the regional unit

- Location within Greece
- Coordinates: 40°40′N 23°37′E
- Country: Greece
- Administrative region: Central Macedonia
- Regional unit: Thessaloniki
- Municipality: Volvi

Area
  - Municipal unit: 128.77 km^{2} (49.72 sq mi)
- Elevation: 35 m (115 ft)

Population (2021)
  - Municipal unit: 4,874
  - Municipal unit density: 37.85/km^{2} (98.03/sq mi)
- Time zone: UTC+2 (EET)
  - Summer (DST): UTC+3 (EEST)

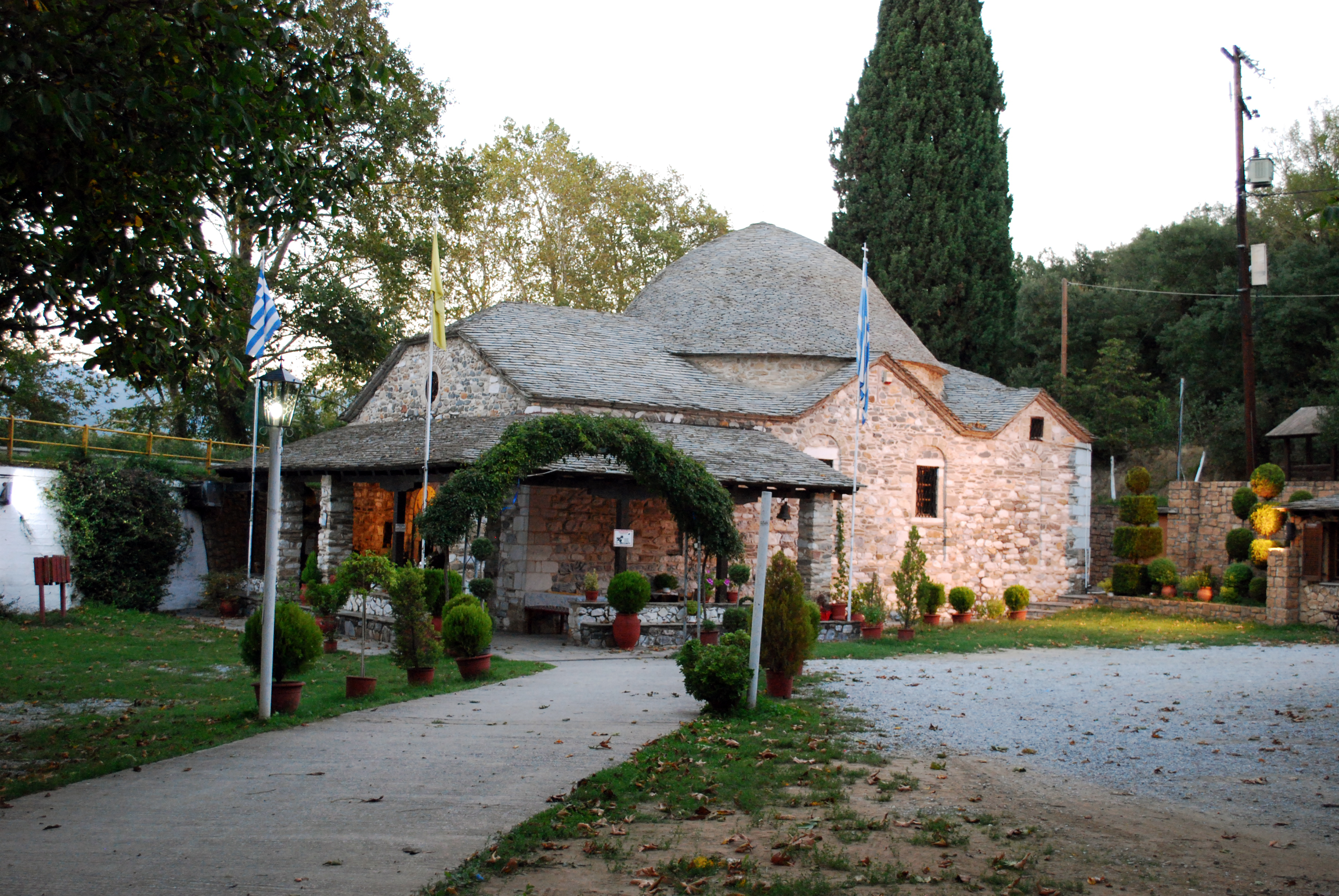
Agia Marina church

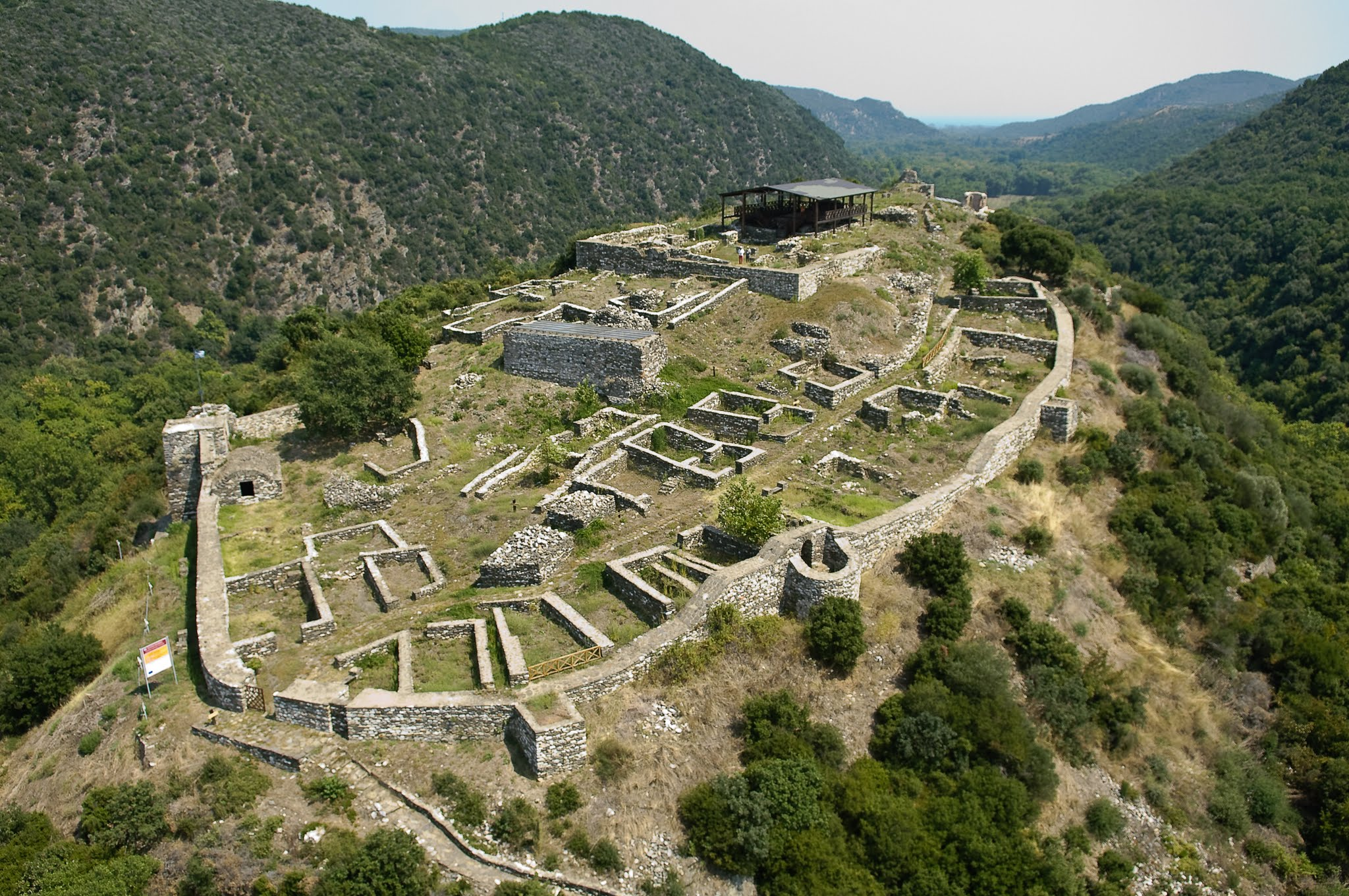
Remains of the fortress

Rentina (Greek: Ρεντίνα) is a village and a former municipality in the Thessaloniki regional unit, Greece. Since the 2011 local government reform it has been a municipal unit within the municipality of Volvi. Its population was 4,874 in 2021. The municipal unit has an area of 128.770 km^{2}. The seat of the (former) municipality was in Stavros. The village Rentina (pop. 115 in 2021), part of the community Volvi, lies at the eastern end of Lake Volvi.

The well preserved Rentina fort served as a strategic strong hold on the Mygdonian basin, overseeing Via Egnatia, at the most eastern domain of thema Thessalonikon and adjacent to thema Strymonikon, particularly during the last 200 years of the Byzantine Empire. References on the last military company that served at Rentina are reflected in the recordings of megas domestikos John Kantakouzenos who as participant observer specified in his History that: "[in July–August of 1334] between Thessaloniki and the fort of Rentina situated on a hill by the shore of lake Bolbi Emperor Andronikos III laid camp for his army, at a certain village known as that of the Cretans which was inhabited by an army of Cretans who for a cause had risen up and moved off the island".
