= Apollonia, Thessaloniki =

Apollonia Απολλωνία
- Municipal unit
- Location within the regional unit

- Location within Greece
- Coordinates: 40°38′N 23°29′E
- Country: Greece
- Administrative region: Central Macedonia
- Regional unit: Thessaloniki
- Municipality: Volvi

Area
  - Municipal unit: 168.393 km^{2} (65.017 sq mi)

Population (2021)
  - Municipal unit: 3,217
  - Municipal unit density: 19.10/km^{2} (49.48/sq mi)
- Time zone: UTC+2 (EET)
  - Summer (DST): UTC+3 (EEST)

Apollonia is an ancient town (former Apollonia in Mygdonia) and a former municipality in the Thessaloniki regional unit, Greece. Since the 2011 local government reform it is part of the municipality Volvi, of which it is a municipal unit. It is located along the historical Via Egnatia in Macedonia, about midway between Thessaloniki and Amphipolis. The municipal unit Apollonia had 3,217 inhabitants in 2021. The municipal unit has an area of 168.393 km^{2}.
