= Arethousa =

Village in Central Macedonia, Greece

Arethousa Αρέθουσα
- Municipal unit

- Location within the regional unit

- Location within Greece
- Coordinates: 40°44.6′N 23°35.4′E
- Country: Greece
- Administrative region: Central Macedonia
- Regional unit: Thessaloniki
- Municipality: Volvi

Area
  - Municipal unit: 214.929 km^{2} (82.985 sq mi)
  - Community: 57.021 km^{2} (22.016 sq mi)
- Elevation: 374 m (1,227 ft)

Population (2021)
  - Municipal unit: 2,238
  - Municipal unit density: 10.41/km^{2} (26.97/sq mi)
  - Community: 636
  - Community density: 11.2/km^{2} (28.9/sq mi)
- Time zone: UTC+2 (EET)
  - Summer (DST): UTC+3 (EEST)
- Postal code: 570 02
- Area code: +30-2395
- Vehicle registration: NA to NX

Arethousa (Greek: Αρέθουσα) is a village and a community and a municipal unit of the Volvi municipality. Before the 2011 local government reform it was part of the municipal unit of Arethousa was an independent municipality. The 2021 census recorded 636 inhabitants in the community and 2,238 inhabitants in the municipal unit. The community of Arethousa covers an area of 57.021 km^{2} while the respective municipal unit 214.929 km^{2}.

== Administrative division ==
The community of Arethousa consists of two separate settlements:

- Arethousa (population 564 as of 2021)
- Lefkouda (population 72)

== See also ==
- List of settlements in the Thessaloniki regional unit
