= Volvi (municipality) =

Volvi Βόλβη
- Municipality
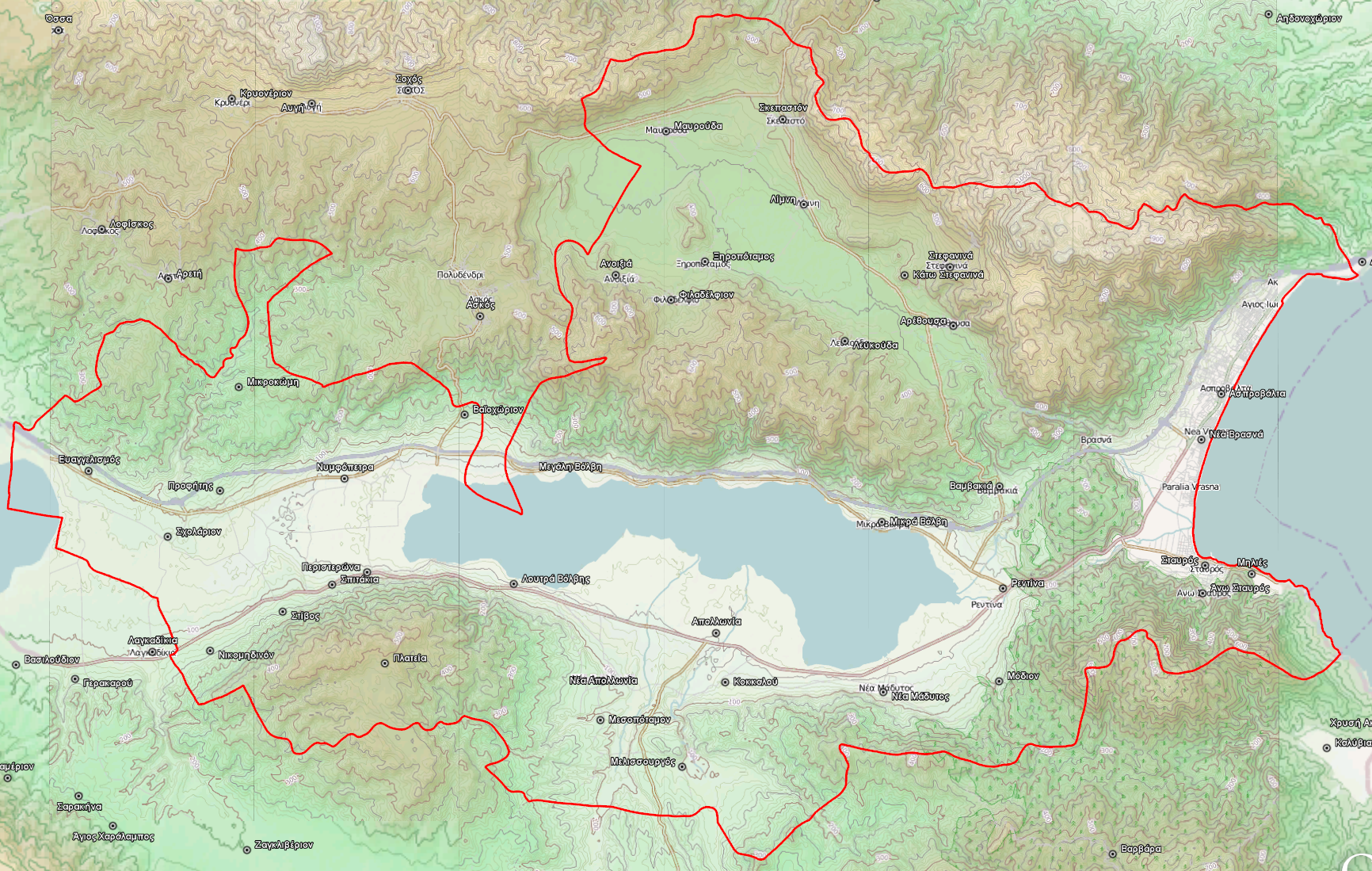

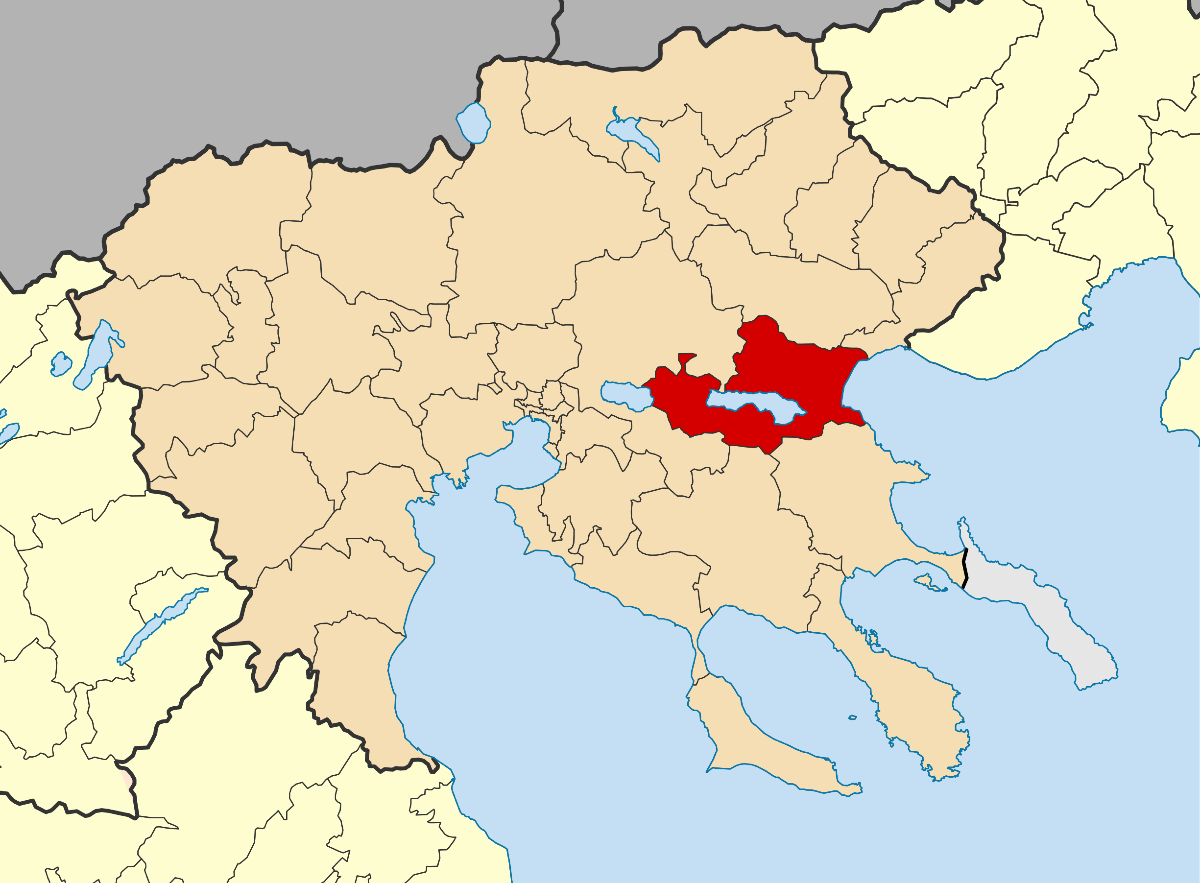

- Location within Greece
- Coordinates: 40°40′N 23°37′E
- Country: Greece
- Administrative region: Central Macedonia
- Regional unit: Thessaloniki
- Seat: Stavros

Area
  - Municipality: 783.01 km^{2} (302.32 sq mi)

Population (2021)
  - Municipality: 19,755
  - Density: 25.230/km^{2} (65.344/sq mi)
- Time zone: UTC+2 (EET)
  - Summer (DST): UTC+3 (EEST)

Volvi (Greek: Βόλβη, Vólvi) is a municipality in the Thessaloniki regional unit, Central Macedonia, Greece. The seat of the municipality is the town Stavros. The municipality has an area of 783.014 km^{2}. It was named after Lake Volvi.

== Municipality ==
The municipality Volvi was formed at the 2011 local government reform by the merger of the following 6 former municipalities, that became municipal units:

- Agios Georgios
- Apollonia
- Arethousa
- Egnatia
- Madytos
- Rentina
