= Child sacrifice =

Killing of a child to appease a tribe or deity

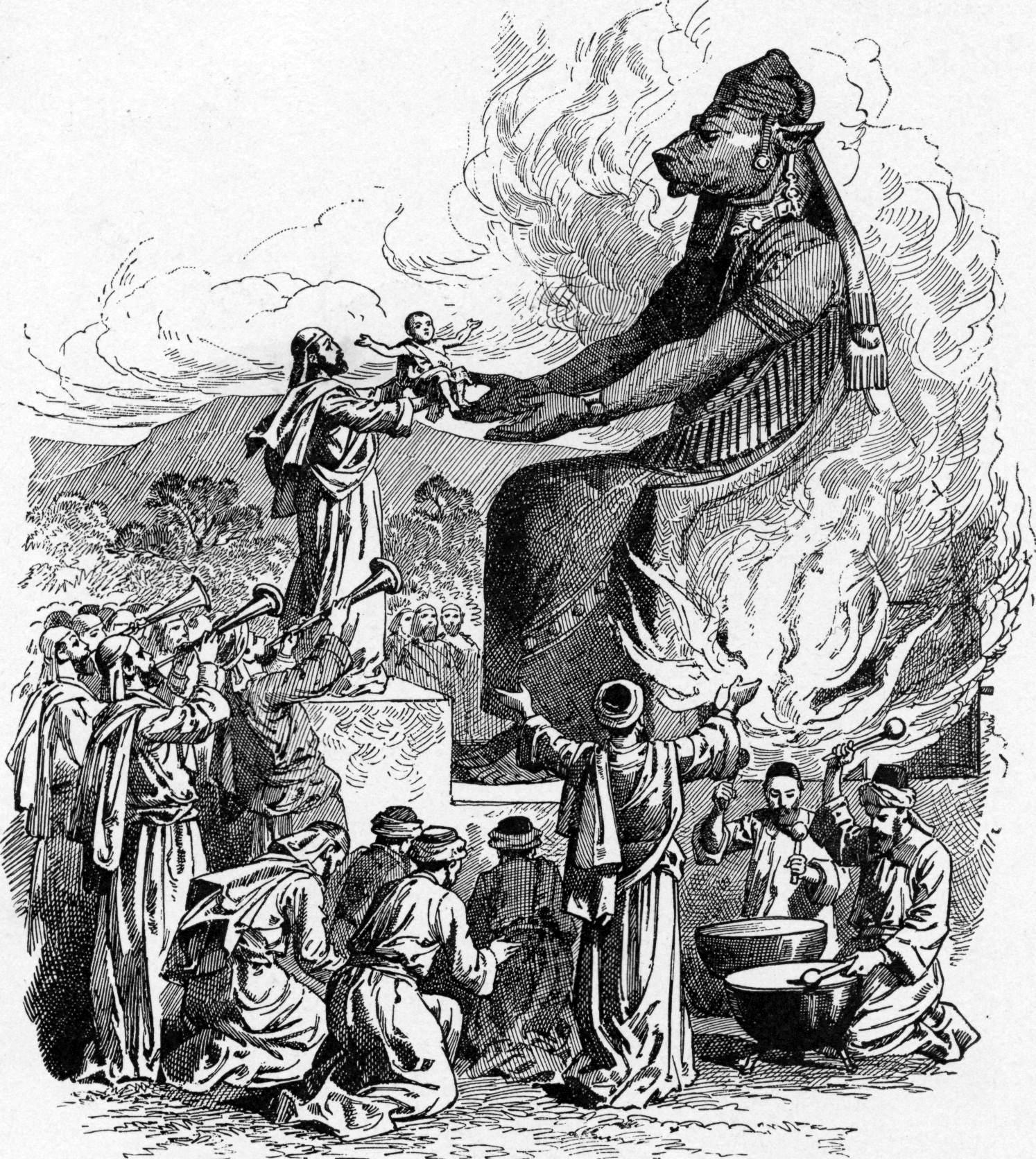
"Offering to Molech" in Bible Pictures and What They Teach Us, by Charles Foster, 1897. The drawing is a typical depiction of child sacrifice in 19th century illustrations.

Child sacrifice is the ritualistic killing of children in order to please or appease a God, deity, supernatural beings, or sacred social order, tribal, group or national loyalties in order to achieve a desired result. As such, it is a form of human sacrifice. Child sacrifice is thought to be an extreme extension of the idea that the more important the object of sacrifice, the more devout the person rendering it.

The practice of child sacrifice in Europe and the Near East appears to have ended as a part of the religious and philosophical transformations of late antiquity.

== Pre-Columbian cultures ==
Archaeologists have found the remains of more than 140 children who were sacrificed in Peru's northern coastal region.

=== Aztec culture ===
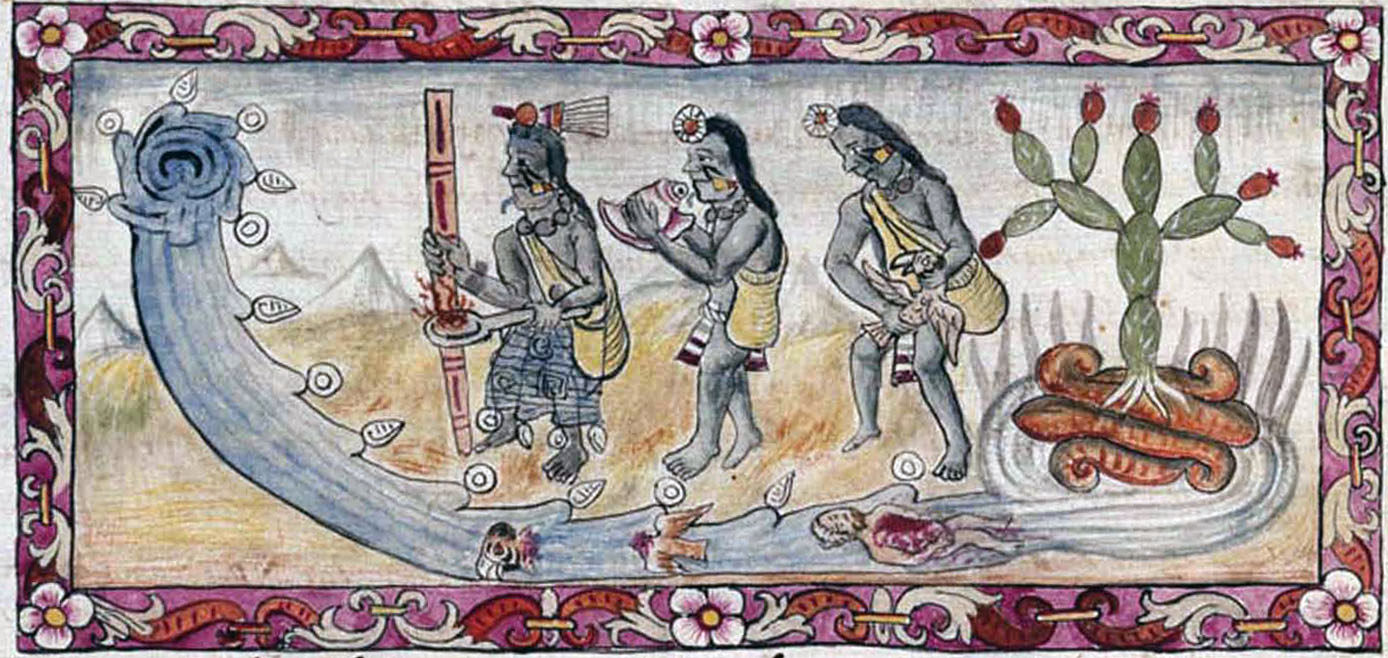
1499, the Aztecs performing child sacrifice to appease the angry gods who had flooded Tenochtitlan

The Aztecs are well known for their ritualistic human sacrifice as offerings to gods with the goal of restoring cosmological balance. While the demographic of people chosen to sacrifice remains unclear, there is evidence that victims were mostly warriors captured in battle and slaves in the slave trade. Human sacrifice was not limited to adults, however; 16th century Spanish codices chronicled child sacrifice to Aztec rain gods. In 2008, archaeologists found and excavated 43 victims of Aztec sacrifice, 37 of which were children. The sacrificial victims were found by Temple R, a temple in Tlatelolco, the ancient Aztec city which is now Mexico City. Temple R was dedicated to the Aztec rain gods, including Tlāloc, Ehecatl, Quetzalcoatl, and Huītzilōpōchtli. A majority (66%) of the excavated subadults were under 3 years old, and 32 subadults as well as 6 adults were identified as male, although the sex determination results could be replicated only for 26 of the 38 individuals.

It is hypothesized that this specific child sacrifice took place during the great drought and famine of 1454–1457, furthering the theory that Aztecs utilized human sacrifice to placate the gods. Osteological and dental pathological evidence shows that many of the child sacrificial victims had varying health issues, and it is suggested that the Tlaloques selected these children who had medical ailments. Because sacrificial victims typically embodied the gods they were being sacrificed to, male child sacrifices were more present at this site due to the masculine nature of the Aztec rain gods.

=== Inca culture ===
The Inca culture sacrificed children in a ritual called qhapaq hucha. Their frozen corpses have been discovered in the South American mountaintops. The first of these corpses, a female child who had died from a blow to the skull, was discovered in 1995 by Johan Reinhard. Other methods of sacrifice included strangulation and simply leaving the children, who had been given an intoxicating drink, to lose consciousness in the extreme cold and low-oxygen conditions of the mountaintop, and to die of hypothermia. Sacrifices amongst the Incas and others were for times of great stress and need, and caused by misunderstandings of natural phenomenon. Such as when a severe earthquake, volcanic eruption or famine struck which to them indicated the gods needed to be appeased. They also believed the children offered would inhabit a better afterlife and be provided for.

=== Maya culture ===
In Maya culture, people believed that supernatural beings had power over their lives and this is one reason that child sacrifice occurred. The sacrifices were essentially to satisfy the supernatural beings. This was done through k'ex, which is an exchange or substitution of something. Through k'ex infants would substitute more powerful humans. It was thought that supernatural beings would consume the souls of more powerful humans and infants were substituted in order to prevent that. Infants are believed to be good offerings because they have a close connection to the spirit world through liminality. It is also believed that parents in Maya culture would offer their children for sacrifice and depictions of this show that this was a very emotional time for the parents, but they would carry through because they thought the child would continue existing. It is also known that infant sacrifices occurred at certain times. Similar to other Mesoamerican cultures, child sacrifice was preferred when there was a time of crisis and transitional times such as famines and droughts.

There is archaeological evidence of infant sacrifice in tombs where the infant has been buried in urns or ceramic vessels. There have also been depictions of child sacrifice in art. Some art includes pottery and steles as well as references to infant sacrifice in mythology and art depictions of the mythology.

=== Moche culture ===
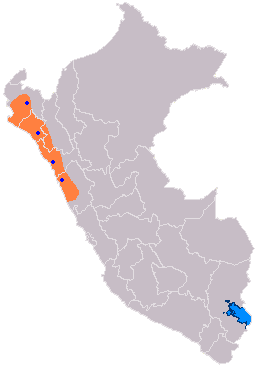
Peru- Moche Culture Region

The Moche of northern Peru practiced mass sacrifices of men and boys. Archeologists found the remains of 137 children and 3 adults, along with 200 camelids, during excavations in 2011, 2014 and 2016, beneath the sands of a 15th-century site called Huanchaquito-Las Llamas. This sacrifice was possibly made during the heavy rains as there was a layer of mud on top of the clean sand.

=== Timoto-Cuica culture ===
The Timoto-Cuicas offered human sacrifices. Until colonial times, children sacrifice persisted secretly in Laguna de Urao (Mérida). It was described by the chronicler Juan de Castellanos, who cited that feasts and human sacrifices were done in honour of Icaque, an Andean prehispanic goddess.

== Ancient Near East ==
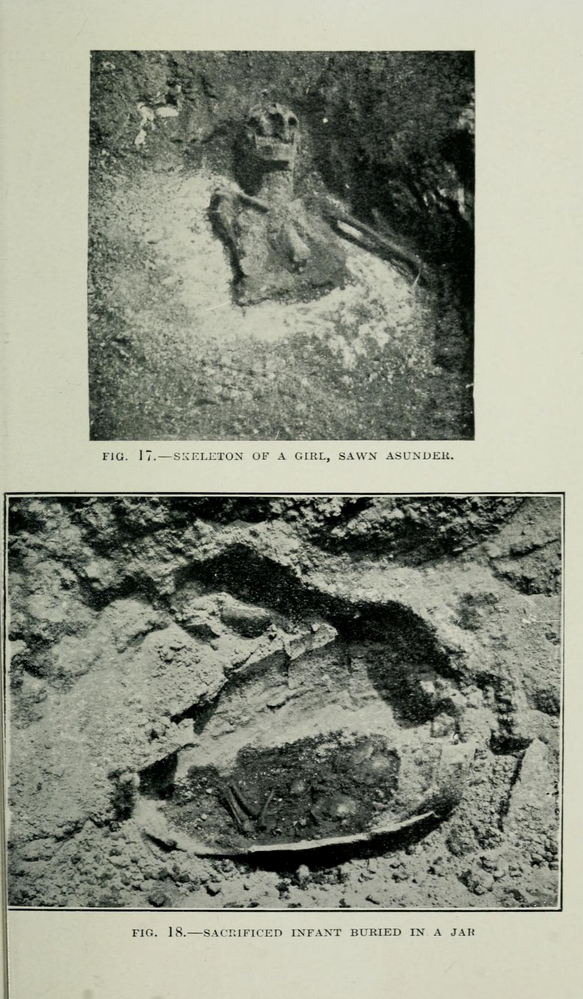
R A Stewart Macalister made claims about child sacrifice in pre-Israelite Gezer.

=== Tanakh ===
The Tanakh mentions human sacrifice in the history of ancient Near Eastern practice. During a battle against Israel, the king of Moab gives his firstborn son and heir as a whole burnt offering (olah, as used of the Temple sacrifice). In the book of the prophet Micah, the question is asked, 'Shall I give my firstborn for my sin, the fruit of my body for the sin of my soul?', and responded to in the phrase, 'He has shown all you people what is good. And what does Yahweh require of you? To act justly and to love mercy and to walk humbly with your God.' The Tanakh also implies that the Ammonites offered child sacrifices to Moloch.

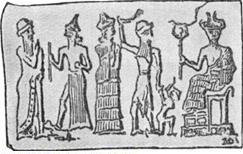
Babylonian cylinder seal representing child sacrifice

According to scholars such as Otto Eissfeldt, Paul G. Mosca, and Susan Ackerman, Moloch was not a name for a god, but instead is a word for a particular form of child sacrifice practiced in Israel and Judah which was not abandoned until the reforms of Josiah. In the Tanakh mentions are made in books such as Kings, Leviticus, and Jeremiah of children being given "to the mōlek". According to Patrick D. Miller these child sacrifice traditions were not originally part of the Yahwism, but were instead foreign imports. Francesca Stavrakopoulou contradicts this, asserting that sacrifices were native to Israel and part of the royal line's attempts to perpetuate itself.

Exodus 22:28b–29 states "The firstborn of your sons you shall give to me" potentially a demand by Yahweh that the firstborn children of the Israelites must be sacrificed to him. However, Jacob Milgrom argues that Yahweh forbids human sacrifice and that in Exodus 22:28b-29, as in the Day of Atonement, Yahweh instituted substitutionary animal sacrifices for human sin and the redemption of the firstborn in Israelite families (cf. Exodus 13:11–16). Yahweh also states to the prophet Jeremiah, "They have built the high places of Topheth in the Valley of Ben Hinnom to burn their sons and daughters in the fire—something I did not command, nor did it enter my mind," (Jeremiah 7:31) which some scholars interpret as indicating that it was once viewed as a central part to the law and desire of Yahweh.

==== Binding of Isaac ====
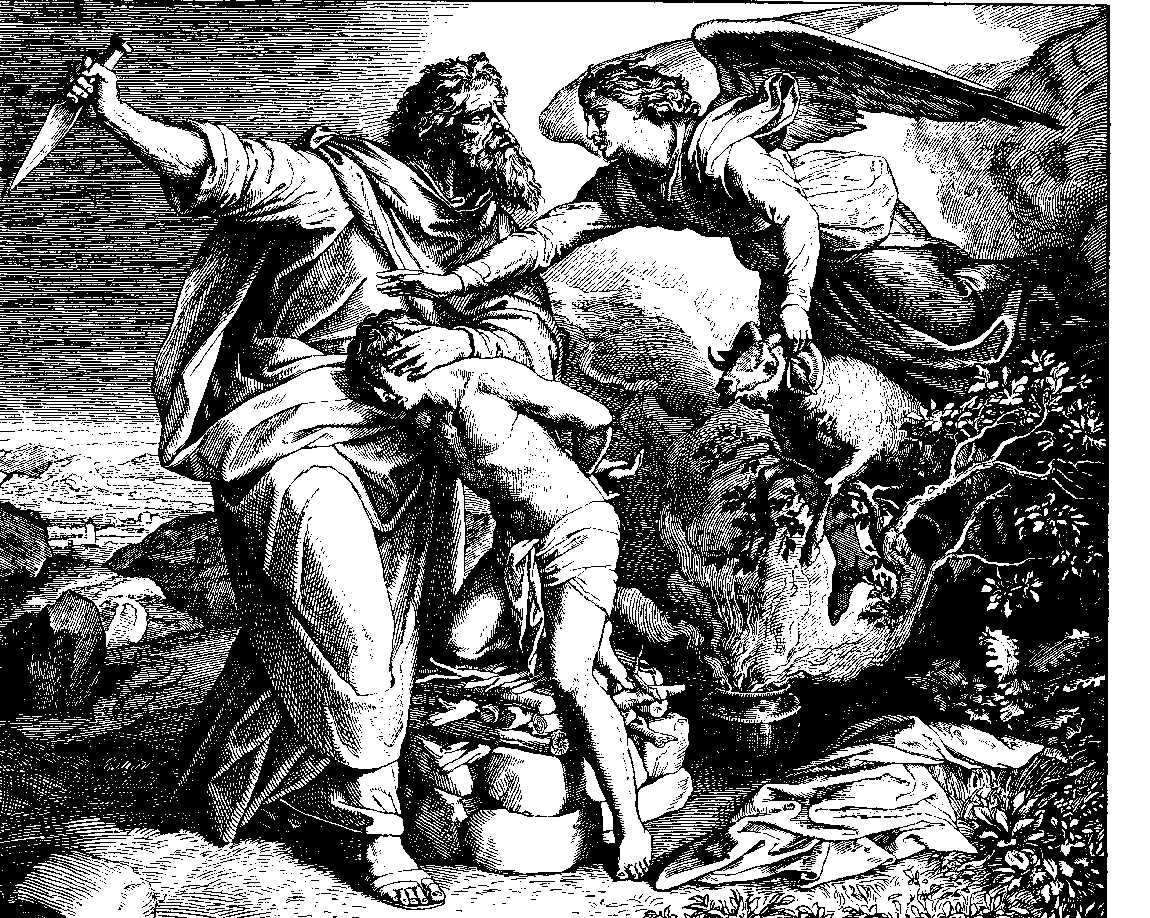
Abraham is interrupted in sacrificing his son on behalf of Yahweh by an angel, by Julius Schnorr von Karolsfeld, 1860

Genesis 22 relates the binding of Isaac, by Abraham to present his son, Isaac, as a sacrifice on Mount Moriah. It was a test of faith (Genesis 22:12). Abraham agrees to this command without arguing. The story ends with an angel stopping Abraham at the last minute and making Isaac's sacrifice unnecessary by providing a ram, caught in some nearby bushes, to be sacrificed instead. Other interpretations of the text have contradicted this version. For example, Martin S. Bergmann states "The Aggadah rabbis asserted that “Isaac was bound on the altar and reduced to ashes, and his sacrificial dust was cast on Mount Moriah." Margaret Barker notes that "Abraham returned to Bersheeba without Isaac" according to Genesis 22:19, a possible sign that he was indeed sacrificed. Barker also stated that wall paintings in the 244 CE Dura-Europos synagogue explicitly show Isaac being sacrificed, followed by his soul traveling to heaven. According to Jon D. Levenson a part of Jewish tradition interpreted Isaac as having been sacrificed. Similarly the German theologians Christan Rose and Hans-Friedrich Weiß maintain that due to the grammatical perfect tense used to describe Abraham's sacrifice of Isaac, he did, in fact, follow through with the action.

Rabbi Abraham Kook, first Chief Rabbi of Israel, stressed that the climax of the story, commanding Abraham not to sacrifice Isaac, is the whole point: to put an end to, and God's total aversion to the ritual of child sacrifice. According to Irving Greenberg the story of the binding of Isaac, symbolizes the prohibition to worship God by human sacrifices, at a time when human sacrifices were the norm worldwide.

==== Ban in Leviticus ====
In Leviticus 18:21, 20:3 and Deuteronomy 12:30–31, 18:10, the Torah contains a number of imprecations against and laws forbidding child sacrifice and human sacrifice in general. The Tanakh denounces human sacrifice as barbaric customs of Baal worshippers (e.g. Psalms 106:37). James Kugel argues that the Torah's specifically forbidding child sacrifice indicates that it happened in Israel as well. The biblical scholar Mark S. Smith argues that the mention of "Tophet" in Isaiah 30:27–33 indicates an acceptance of child sacrifice in the early Jerusalem practices, to which the law in Leviticus 20:2–5 forbidding child sacrifice is a response. Some scholars have stated that at least some Israelites and Judahites believed child sacrifice was a legitimate religious practice.

==== Numbers 31 ====
In the aftermath of the War against the Midianites narrated in Numbers 31, the Israelites appear to be dedicating 32 captive Midianite virgin girls to be sacrificed to Yahweh as his share in the spoils of war.

It is not clear what happened to Yahweh's 0.1% share of the spoils of war, including 808 animals (verses 36–39) and 32 human virgin women/girls (verse 40), who are entrusted to the Levites, who are responsible for maintaining Yahweh's tabernacle (verses 30 and 47). (Note: For example, Methodist theologian Joel L. Watts (2019) wrote: "Only 32 men [sic] were given to the priests for the deity, leaving us to wonder if this surrendering was to die or to work.") Two Hebrew terms are used to indicate they are a 'tribute' or 'levy' that is 'offered' or 'contributed' to Yahweh:

- me·ḵes or ham·me·ḵes (verses 28, 37 and 41), generally translated as 'tribute', 'tax' or 'levy'. Outside these three occurrences in Numbers 31, it appears nowhere else in the Hebrew Bible. It is also attested in Ugaritic as mekes and in Akkadian as miksu. An inflection of mekes is וּמִכְסָ֥ם ū·miḵ·sām, occurring only in verses 38, 39 and 40.
- tə-rū-maṯ (verses 29 and 41); the term terumah (plural: terumat) is generally translated as '(heave) offering' or 'contribution' and is associated with heave offerings.

Some scholars have concluded that these 32 human virgins were to be sacrificed to Yahweh as a burnt offering along with the animals. For example, in 1854, Carl Falck-Lebahn compared the incident with the near-sacrifice of Iphigenia in Greek mythology, claiming: "According to Levit. xxvii, 29, sacrifices of human victims were clearly established among the Jews." After recounting the story of Jephthah's daughter in Judges 11, he reasoned: "the Jews (according to Numbers, chap 31) took 61,000 asses, 72,000 oxen, 675,000 sheep, and 32,000 virgins (whose fathers, mothers, brothers &c., were butchered). There were 16,000 girls for the soldiers, 16,000 for the priests; and on the soldiers' share there was levied a tribute of 32 virgins for the Lord. What became of them? The Jews had no nuns. What was the Lord's share in all the wars of the Hebrews, if it was not blood?"

Carl Plfuger in 1995 cited Exodus 17, Numbers 31, Deuteronomy 13 and 20 as examples of human sacrifice demanded by Yahweh, adding that according to 1 Samuel 15, Saul "lost his kingship of Israel because he had withheld the human sacrifice that Yahweh, the god of Israel, expected as his due after a war." Susan Niditch remarked in 1995 that, at the time of her writing, "increasingly scholars suggest that Israelites engaged in state-sponsored rituals of child sacrifice". Although "[s]uch ritual activity is condemned by Jeremiah, Ezekiel, and other biblical writers (e.g., Lev 18:21, Deut 12:31, 18:10; Jer 7:30–31, 19:5; Ezek 20:31), and the seventh-century reformer king Josiah sought to put an end to it, [the] notion of a god who desires human sacrifice may well have been an important thread in Israelite belief." She cited the Mesha Stele as evidence that the neighbouring Moabites performed human sacrifices with prisoners of war to their god Chemosh after successfully attacking an Israelite city in the 9th century BCE. Before the 7th-century BCE reformers of king Josiah of the southern Kingdom of Judah tried to end the practice of human/child sacrifice, it appears to have been commonplace in Israelite military culture.

Other scholars have concluded that the virgins and animals were kept alive and used by the Levites as their share of the spoils. Some even posited that human sacrifice (especially child sacrifice) was foreign to the Israelites, thus making the possibility of sacrificing the Midianite virgins unfeasible. Carl Friedrich Keil and Franz Delitzsch argued in 1870 that the 32 were enslaved:

Of the one half the priests received 675 head of small cattle, 72 oxen, 61 asses, and 32 maidens for Jehovah; and these Moses handed over to Eleazar, in all probability for the maintenance of the priests, in the same manner as the tithes (Numbers 18:26–28, and Leviticus 27:30–33), so that they might put the cattle into their own flocks (Numbers 35:3), and slay oxen or sheep as they required them, whilst they sold the asses, and made slaves of the gifts; and not in the character of a vow, in which case the clean animals would have had to be sacrificed, and the unclean animals, as well as the human beings, to be redeemed (Leviticus 27:2–13).

==== Gehenna and Tophet ====
The most extensive accounts of child sacrifice in the Hebrew Bible refer to those carried out in Gehenna by two kings of Judah, Ahaz and Manasseh of Judah.

==== Jephthah's daughter ====
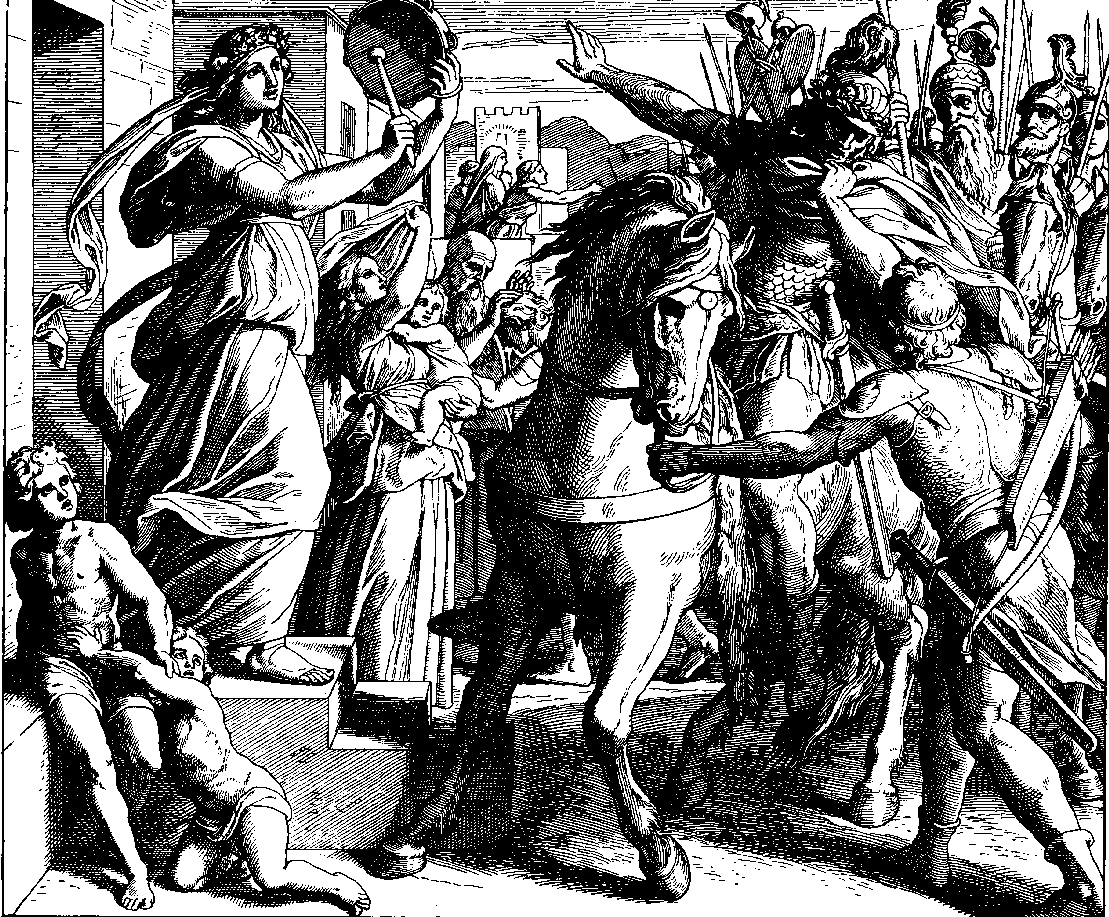
Jephthah sees his daughter in this 1860 woodcut by Julius Schnorr von Karolsfeld

In the Book of Judges, chapter 11, the figure of Jephthah makes a vow to God, saying, "If you give the Ammonites into my hands, whatever comes out of the door of my house to meet me when I return in triumph from the Ammonites will be the Lord's, and I will sacrifice it as a burnt offering" (as worded in the New International Version). Jephthah succeeds in winning a victory, but when he returns to his home in Mizpah he sees his daughter, dancing to the sound of timbrels, outside. After allowing her two months preparation, Judges 11:39 states that Jephthah kept his vow. According to the commentators of the rabbinic Jewish tradition, Jepthah's daughter was not sacrificed but was forbidden to marry and remained a spinster her entire life, fulfilling the vow that she would be devoted to the Lord. The 1st-century CE Jewish historian Flavius Josephus, however, interpreted this to mean that Jephthah burned his daughter on Yahweh's altar, whilst pseudo-Philo, late first century CE, wrote that Jephthah offered his daughter as a burnt offering because he could find no sage in Israel who would cancel his vow. In other words, this story of human sacrifice is not an order or requirement by God, but the punishment for those who vowed to sacrifice humans.

=== Phoenicia and Carthage ===
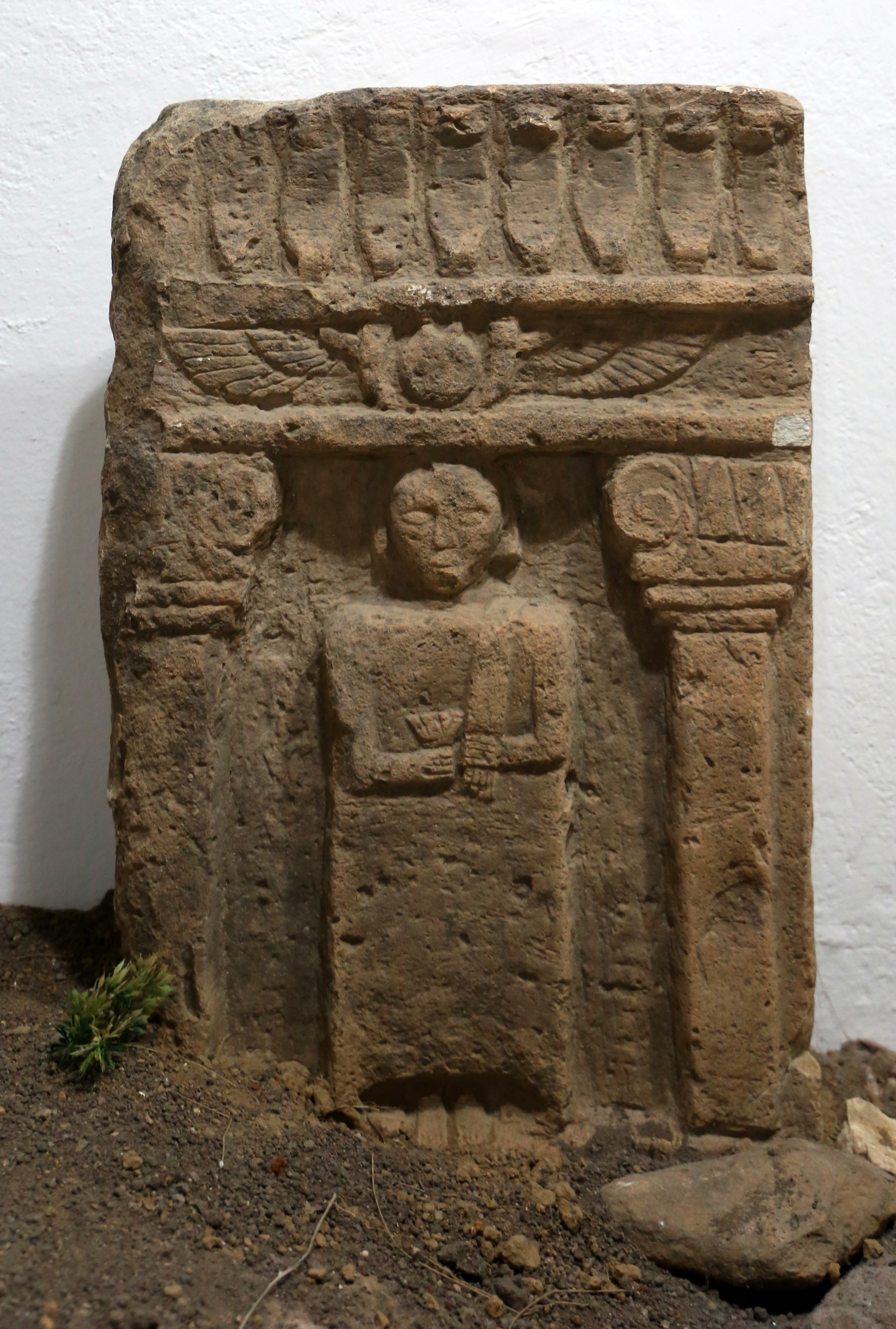
The inscription on this Sardinian votive doesn't mention the sacrifice

The practice of child sacrifice among Canaanite groups is attested by numerous sources spanning over a millennium. Diodorus Siculus recounts that Carthaginians "alleged that Kronos had turned against them" because while they were previously accustomed to sacrificing their noblest sons to him, they more recently secretly bought and nurtured children to sacrifice, and an investigation found that some sacrifices were "substituted by stealth". To make up for the lost sacrifices, they sacrificed two hundred of their noblest children, and three hundred who were suspected of substituting sacrifices sacrificed themselves voluntarily. Siculus recounts a bronze statue of Kronos with its palms up, and children placed on them would roll into a fire pit. He speculates that Euripides was inspired by this in writing about sacrifices in Tauris in his stories, and that the Carthaginians were inspired by the Greek myth that Cronus killed his children.

Cleitarchus recounted that Kleitarchos claimed the Phoenicians and the Carthaginians would pray to Kronos and make a vow on their children, sacrificing the child if they received what they prayed for. He also wrote of a bronze Kronos statue with upturned hands over a bronze oven. According to him, "The flame of the burning child reached its body until, the limbs having shriveled up and the smiling mouth appearing to be almost laughing, it would slip into the oven. Therefore the grin is called 'sardonic laughter,' since they die laughing."

Plutarch argued "would it not have been far better for the Carthaginians to have taken Critias or Diagoras to draw up their law-code at the very beginning, and so not to believe in any divine power or god, rather than to offer such sacrifices as they used to offer to Cronos?" He wrote that they knowingly sacrificed their own children, and those without children would buy children from the poor to sacrifice by cutting their throats like lambs or birds. The mother who sold the child was expected not to cry, or she would lose the money from the sale. Flutes and drums were played around the sacrificial statue to mask the crying.

Theophrastus recounted human sacrifice in Arcadia during Lykaia and in Carthage to Kronos, including occasional child sacrifice, "even though the divine law among them bars from the rites, by means of perirrhanteria and the herald's proclamation, anyone responsible for the shedding of blood in peacetime."

Tertullian wrote "In Africa infants used to be sacrificed to Saturn, and quite openly, down to the proconsulate of Tiberius, who took the priests themselves and on the very trees of their temple, under whose shadow their crimes had been committed, hung them alive like votive offerings on crosses; and the soldiers of my own country are witnesses to it, who served that proconsul in that very task. Yes, and to this day that holy crime persists in secret."

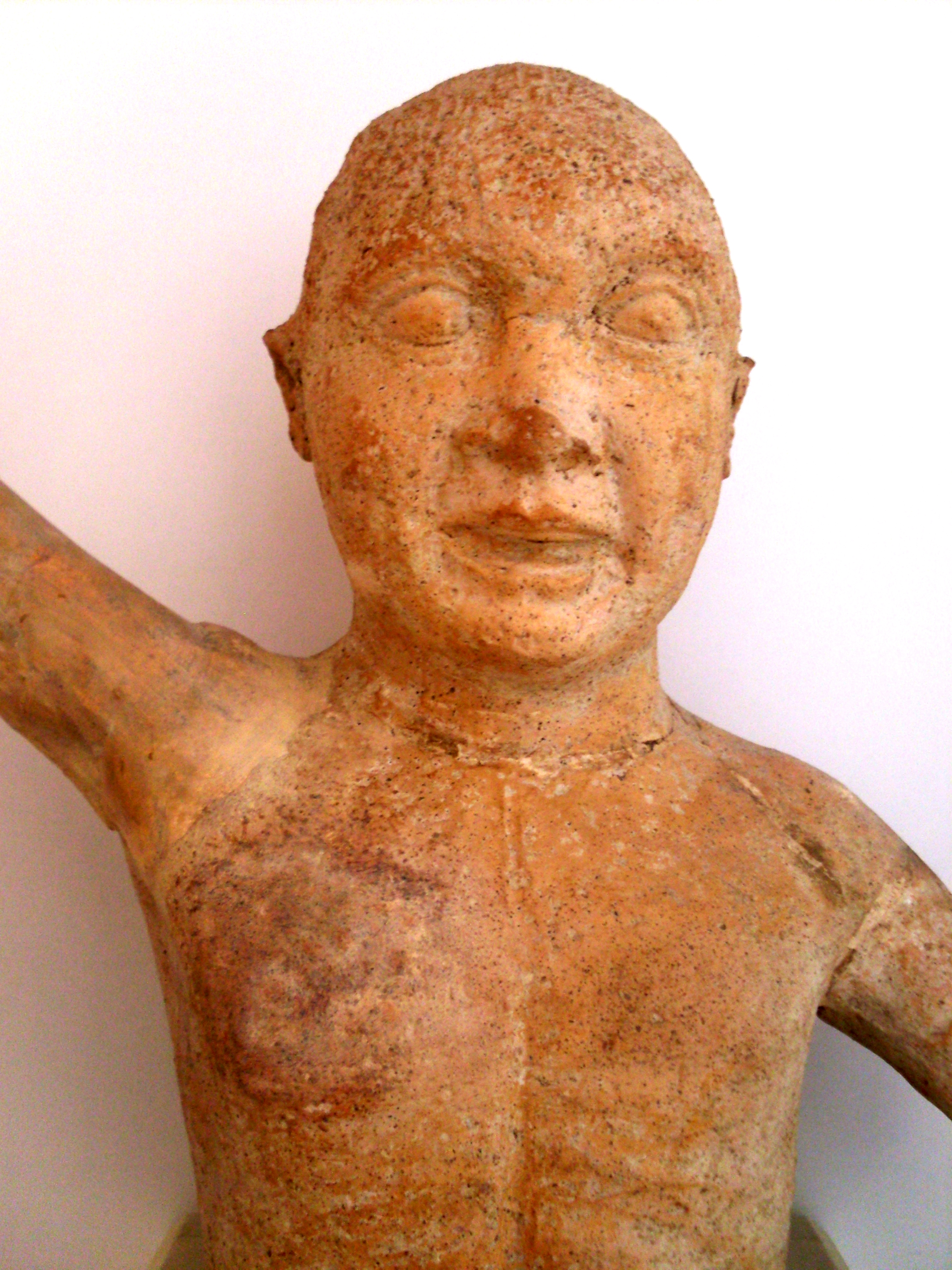
Child depicted, Tunisian figure

Philo of Byblos wrote that ancient peoples in danger would ritually sacrifice children to avenging gods rather than lose everyone. According to him, "Kronos, whom the Phoenicians call El, who was in their land and who was later divinized after his death as the star of Kronos, had an only son by a local bride named Anobret, and therefore they called him Ieoud. Even now among the Phoenicians the only son is given this name. When war's gravest dangers gripped the land, Kronos dressed his son in royal attire, prepared an altar and sacrificed him."

Lucian recounted that children would be sacrificed at a gateway at which animals were sacrificed. However, instead of hurling them from the gateway to die from the fall, children were laid in a pallet and dropped by hand. Those performing the sacrifice would "mock them and say that they are oxen, not children."

Plato also accused the Carthaginians of sacrificing children to Cronos, and so did Quintus Curtius Rufus. Porphyry accused the Phoenicians of doing the same.

At Carthage, a large cemetery exists that combines the bodies of both very young children and small animals, and those who assert child sacrifice have argued that if the animals were sacrificed, then so too were the children. Recent archaeology, however, has produced a detailed breakdown of the ages of the buried children and, based on this and especially on the presence of prenatal individuals – that is, still births – it is also argued that this site is consistent with burials of children who had died of natural causes in a society that had a high infant mortality rate, as Carthage is assumed to have had. That is, the data support the view that Tophets were cemeteries for those who died shortly before or after birth. Conversely, Patricia Smith and colleagues from the Hebrew University and Harvard University show from the teeth and skeletal analysis at the Carthage Tophet that infant ages at death (about two months) do not correlate with the expected ages of natural mortality (perinatal), apparently supporting the child sacrifice thesis.

Greek, Roman and Israelite writers refer to Phoenician child sacrifice. Skeptics suggest that the bodies of children found in Carthaginian and Phoenician cemeteries were merely the cremated remains of children that died naturally. Sergio Ribichini has argued that the Tophet was "a child necropolis designed to receive the remains of infants who had died prematurely of sickness or other natural causes, and who for this reason were "offered" to specific deities and buried in a place different from the one reserved for the ordinary dead".

According to Stager and Wolff, in 1984, there was a consensus among scholars that Carthaginian children were sacrificed by their parents, who would make a vow to kill the next child if the gods would grant them a favor: for instance that their shipment of goods was to arrive safely in a foreign port.

== Europe ==
Archaeologist Peter Warren was involved in the British School at Athens excavation of Palekastro for one season and the excavation at Lefkandi for two seasons. Then he led the excavation at Fournou Korifi, Myrtos from 1967 to 1968. During the 1980s, in two archaeology magazines, Warren wrote about "child sacrifice" despite there being no mention of this subject in the official excavation report, which was completed and published along with his book in 1972.

Startling as it may seem, the available evidence so far points to an argument that the children were slaughtered and their flesh cooked and possibly eaten in a sacrifice ritual made in the service of a nature deity to assure an annual renewal of fertility.

Rodney Castleden uncovered a sanctuary near Knossos where the remains of a 17-year-old were found.

His ankles had evidently been tied and his legs folded up to make him fit on the table... He had been ritually murdered with the long bronze dagger engraved with a boar's head that lay beside him.

The Ver Sacrum is a religious practice of ancient Italic peoples, especially the Sabelli (or Sabini) and their offshoot Samnites. The practice is related to that of devotio in Roman religion. It was customary to resort to it at times of particular danger or strife for the community. Some scholars believe that in earlier times devoted or vowed children were actually sacrificed, but later expulsion was substituted. Dionysius of Halicarnassus states the practice of child sacrifice was one of the causes that brought about the fall of the Pelasgians in Italy.

The human children who had been devoted were required to leave the community in early adulthood, at 20 or 21 years of age. They were entrusted to a god for protection, and led to the border with a veiled face. Often they were led by an animal under the auspices of the god. As a group, the youth were called sacrani and were supposed to enjoy the protection of Mars until they had reached their destination, expelled the inhabitants or forced them into submission, and founded their own settlement.

The Waldensians, a medieval Christian sect deemed heretical, were accused of participating in child sacrifice.

== Africa ==
=== Canary Islands ===
In the heart of the ancient Guanche culture, in Tenerife it was the custom to throw a living child from the Punta de Rasca at sunrise at the summer solstice. Sometimes these children came from all parts of the island, even from remote areas of Punta de Rasca. It follows that it was a common custom of the island. On this island sacrificing other human victims associated with the death of the king, where adult men rushed to the sea are also known. Embalmers who produced the Guanche mummies also had a habit of throwing themselves into the sea one year after the king's death.

Bones of children mixed with lambs and kids were found in Gran Canaria, and in Tenerife amphorae have been found with remains of children inside. This suggests a different kind of ritual infanticide than those who were thrown overboard.

=== South Africa ===
The continued murder within Black communities of children of all ages, for body parts with which to make muti, for purposes of witchcraft, still occurs in South Africa. Muti murders occur throughout South Africa, especially in rural areas. Traditional healers or witch doctors often grind up body parts and combine them with roots, herbs, seawater, animal parts, and other ingredients to prepare potions and spells for their clients.

=== Uganda ===
In the early 21st century Uganda has experienced a revival of child sacrifice. In spite of government attempts to downplay the issue, an investigation by the BBC into human sacrifice in Uganda found that ritual killings of children are more common than Ugandan authorities admit. There are many indicators that politicians and politically connected wealthy businessmen are involved in sacrificing children in practice of traditional religion, which has become a commercial enterprise.

== See also ==
- Child cannibalism
- Early infanticidal childrearing
- Human sacrifice
- Infanticide
- Religious abuse
- Religious violence
- Satanic panic/Satanic ritual abuse
