= Sarakina =

Sarakina may refer to:

- Sarakina, Grevena, a village in Greece
- Sarakina, Thessaloniki, a village in Greece
- Sarakina, Trikala, a village in Greece, part of Kalampaka
- Sarakina Gorge, Crete
