= Agios Charalambos, Thessaloniki =

Agios Charalambos Άγιος Χαράλαμπος
- Settlement
- Location within Greece
- Coordinates: 40°34.8′N 23°13.9′E
- Country: Greece
- Administrative region: Central Macedonia
- Regional unit: Thessaloniki
- Municipality: Lagkadas
- Municipal unit: Kallindoia
- Community: Sarakina
- Elevation: 250 m (820 ft)

Population (2021)
  - Total: 57
- Time zone: UTC+2 (EET)
  - Summer (DST): UTC+3 (EEST)
- Postal code: 572 00
- Area code: +30-2394
- Vehicle registration: NA to NX

Agios Charalambos (Greek: Άγιος Χαράλαμπος) is a village of the Lagkadas municipality. Before the 2011 local government reform it was part of the municipality of Kallindoia. The 2021 census recorded 57 inhabitants in the village. Agios Charalambos is a part of the community of Sarakina.

== See also ==
- List of settlements in the Thessaloniki regional unit
