= Petrokerasa =

Petrokerasa Πετροκέρασα
- Community
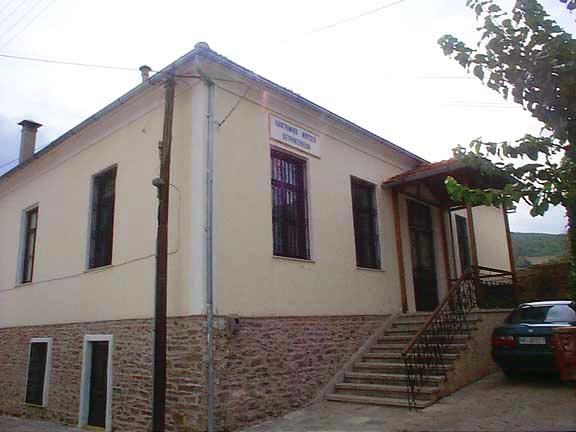
- The folklore museum in Petrokerasa

- Location within Greece
- Coordinates: 40°31′N 23°17.1′E
- Country: Greece
- Administrative region: Central Macedonia
- Regional unit: Thessaloniki
- Municipality: Lagkadas
- Municipal unit: Kallindoia

Area
  - Community: 27.398 km^{2} (10.578 sq mi)
- Elevation: 520 m (1,710 ft)

Population (2021)
  - Community: 250
  - Density: 9.1/km^{2} (24/sq mi)
- Time zone: UTC+2 (EET)
  - Summer (DST): UTC+3 (EEST)
- Postal code: 570 12
- Area code: +30-2393
- Vehicle registration: NA to NX

Petrokerasa (Greek: Πετροκέρασα), known before 1927 as Ravna (Ραβνά), is a village and a community of the Lagkadas municipality. Before the 2011 local government reform it was part of the municipality of Kallindoia, of which it was a municipal district. The 2021 census recorded 250 inhabitants in the village. The community of Petrokerasa covers an area of 27.398 km^{2}.

== See also ==
- List of settlements in the Thessaloniki regional unit
