= Nea Kallindoia =

Nea Kallindoia Νέα Καλλίνδοια
- Community
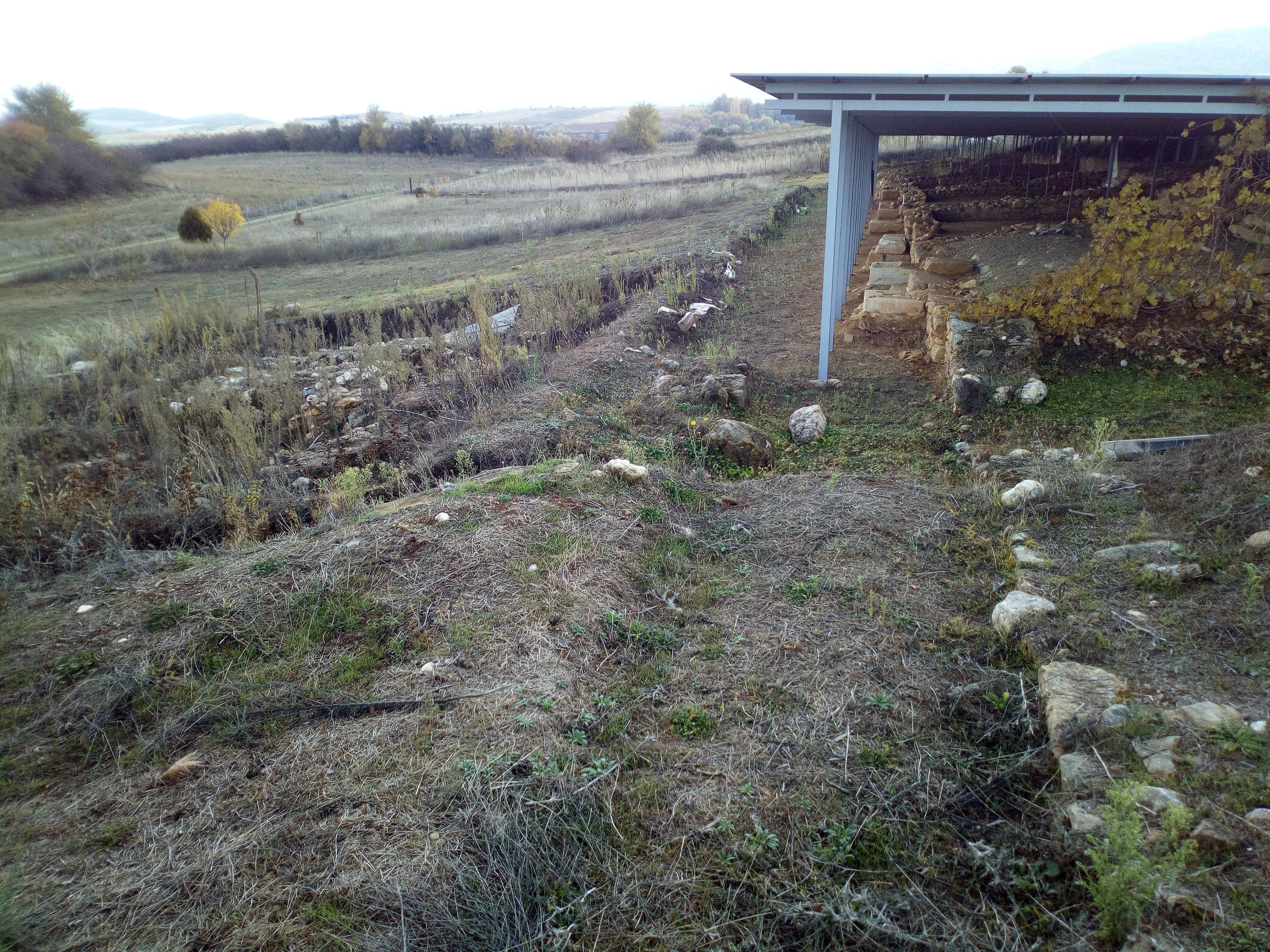
- The archaeological site of Kalindoia, after which Nea Kallindoia is named

- Location within Greece
- Coordinates: 40°33.35′N 23°22.5′E
- Country: Greece
- Administrative region: Central Macedonia
- Regional unit: Thessaloniki
- Municipality: Lagkadas
- Municipal unit: Kallindoia

Area
  - Community: 29.418 km^{2} (11.358 sq mi)
- Elevation: 220 m (720 ft)

Population (2021)
  - Community: 449
  - Density: 15.3/km^{2} (39.5/sq mi)
- Time zone: UTC+2 (EET)
  - Summer (DST): UTC+3 (EEST)
- Postal code: 570 12
- Area code: +30-2393
- Vehicle registration: NA to NX

Nea Kallindoia (Greek: Νέα Καλλίνδοια) is a community of the Lagkadas municipality. Before the 2011 local government reform it was part of the municipality of Kallindoia, of which it was a municipal district. The 2021 census recorded 449 inhabitants in the community. The community of Nea Kallindoia covers an area of 29.418 km^{2}. Its name translates to "New Kalindoia", with Kalindoia being an ancient city located in what is now the community.

== Administrative division ==
The community of Nea Kallindoia consists of two separate settlements:

- Kalamoto (population 398 in 2021)
- Mesokomo (population 51)

== See also ==
- List of settlements in the Thessaloniki regional unit
