= Mesokomo =

Mesokomo Μεσόκωμο
- Settlement
- Location within Greece
- Coordinates: 40°34′N 23°21.2′E
- Country: Greece
- Administrative region: Central Macedonia
- Regional unit: Thessaloniki
- Municipality: Lagkadas
- Municipal unit: Kallindoia
- Community: Nea Kallindoia
- Elevation: 240 m (790 ft)

Population (2021)
  - Total: 51
- Time zone: UTC+2 (EET)
  - Summer (DST): UTC+3 (EEST)
- Postal code: 570 12
- Area code: +30-2393
- Vehicle registration: NA to NX

Mesokomo (Greek: Μεσόκωμο) is a village of the Lagkadas municipality. The 2021 census recorded 51 inhabitants in the village. Mesokomo is a part of the community of Nea Kallindoia.

== See also ==
- List of settlements in the Thessaloniki regional unit
