= Myrtos Pyrgos =

Archaeological site in Crete, Greece

Coordinates: 35°00′25″N 25°35′26″E

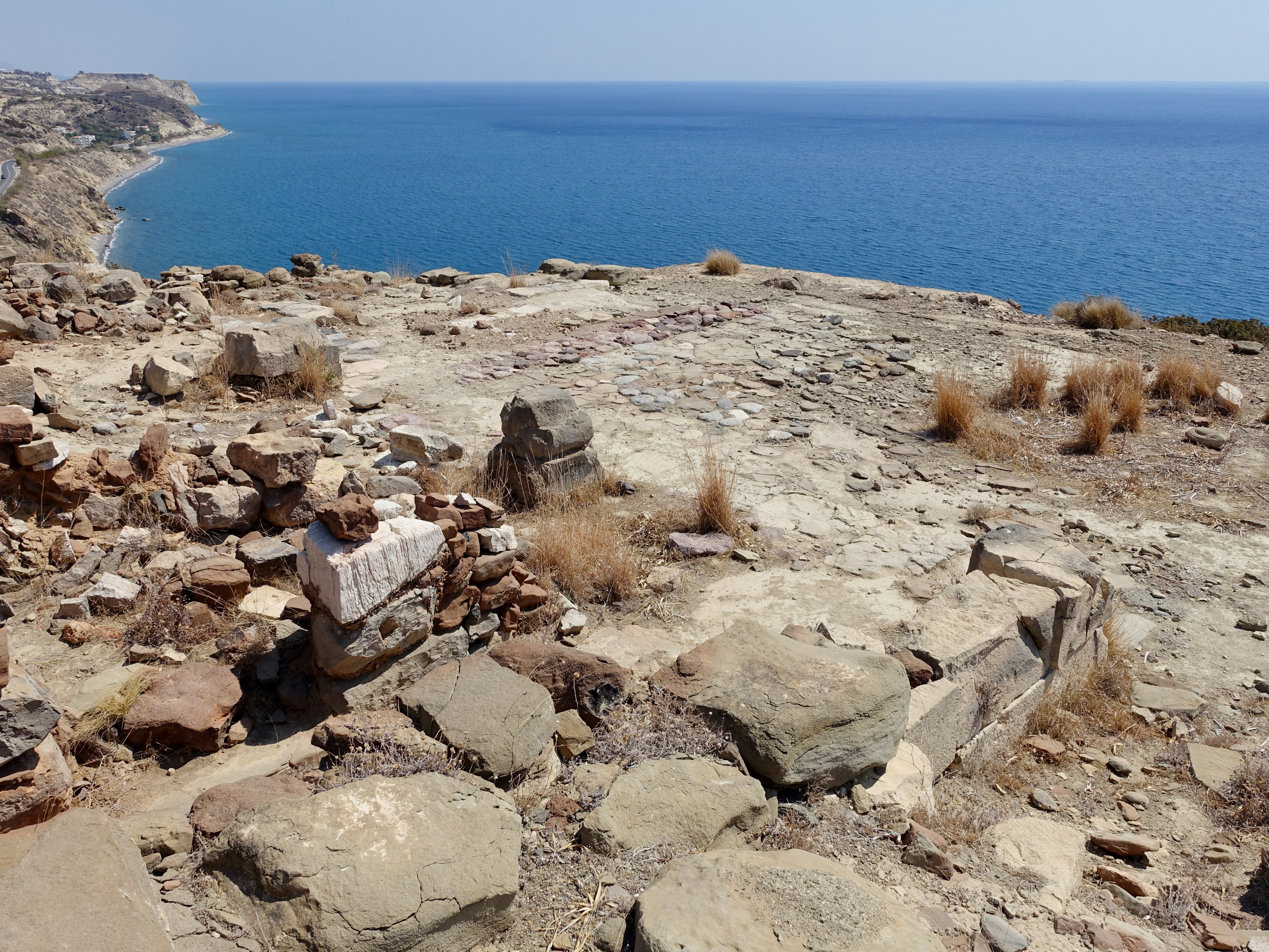
Myrtos Pyrgos

Pyrgos (also Myrtos-Pyrgos; Greek: Πύργος [στο Μύρτος]) is an archaeological site of the Minoan civilization near Myrtos in the municipality of Ierapetra on the south coast of Crete. Pyrgos provides evidence of settlements along the southern Ierapetra Isthmus. This site has had a long history due to its valuable location and geography. It is located close to the Myrtos valley and has a harbor with a nearby mountain range providing its protection. The settlement includes a courtyard, many rooms, a country house and a tomb.

== History ==
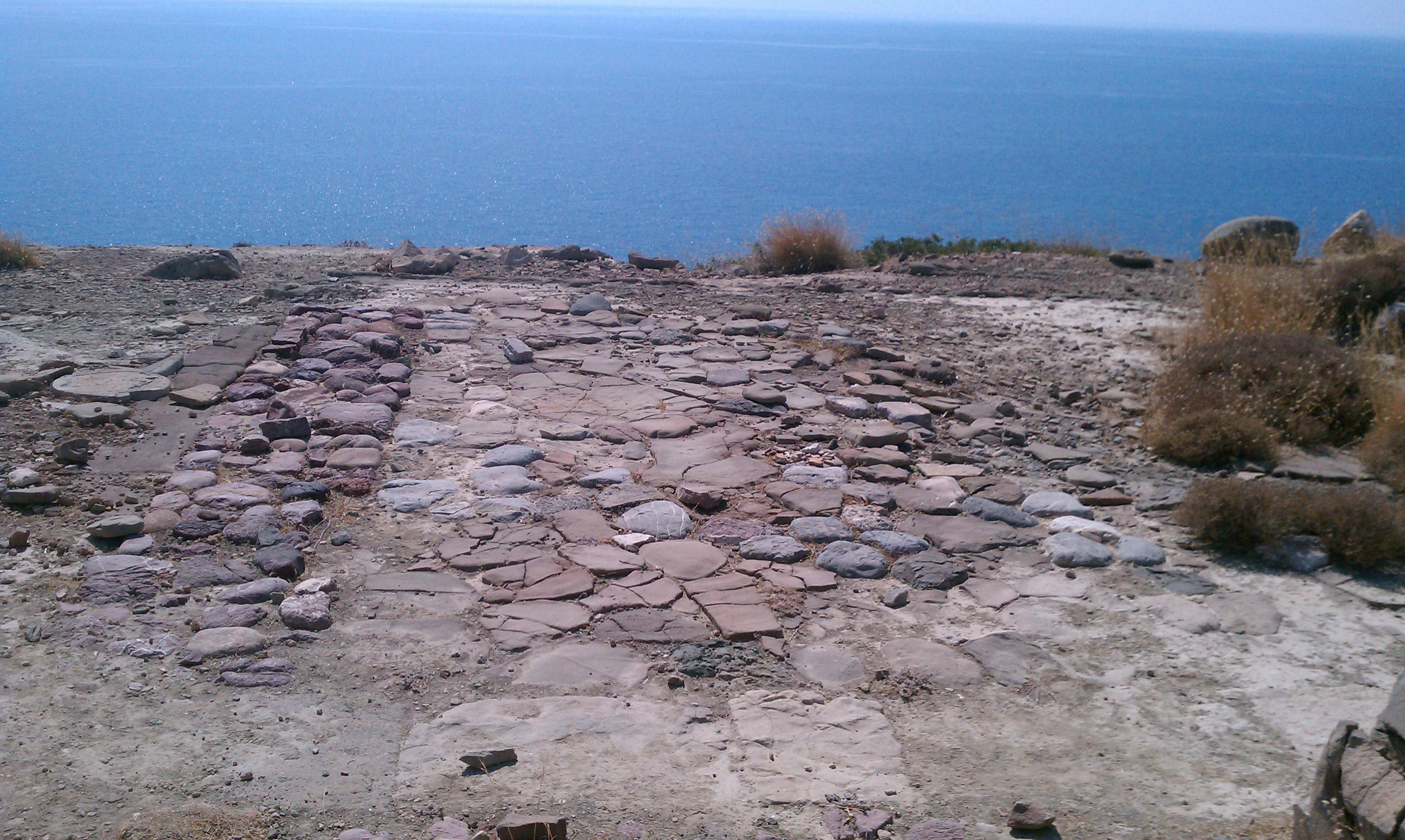
Pyrgos Myrtos overlooking the Libyan Sea

In 1970 the site began to be excavated by archaeologist Gerald Cadogan. It is near another Myrtos settlement called Fournou Korifi. This settlement lasted from the early Minoan period, middle Minoan period, and the Neopalatial period. The early Minoan Period lasted from 3560 BCE to 2160 BCE. The middle Minoan period includes the old and new palace period which lasted from 2160 BCE to 1600 BCE. The late Minoan period lasted from 1600 BCE to 1170 BCE.

This site was established approximately 3000 BCE with Fourno Korifi being established around the same time. They were both destroyed in a fire around 2150 BCE. Its estimated Pyrgos was resettled in 1900 BCE. From then on Pyrgos served as an administrative center and established new structures.

== Archaeology ==
This Minoan settlement on the road to Ierapetra boasts several Minoan features: a drain, paved floors and footpaths and ashlar foundation blocks for its central building. Although historians may debate whether certain Minoan sites were actually administrative or exchange sites, it is widely agreed Myrtos-Pyrgos was an administrative site. Myrtos Pyrgos is used as an example of what an administrative site during the Minoan civilization looks like. Unlike other settlements, Myrtos-Pyrgos named rulers found in iconography with proof of control of exchanges and items produced. This site is also known for its central tomb and country house.

=== Myrtos Pyrgos Country House ===
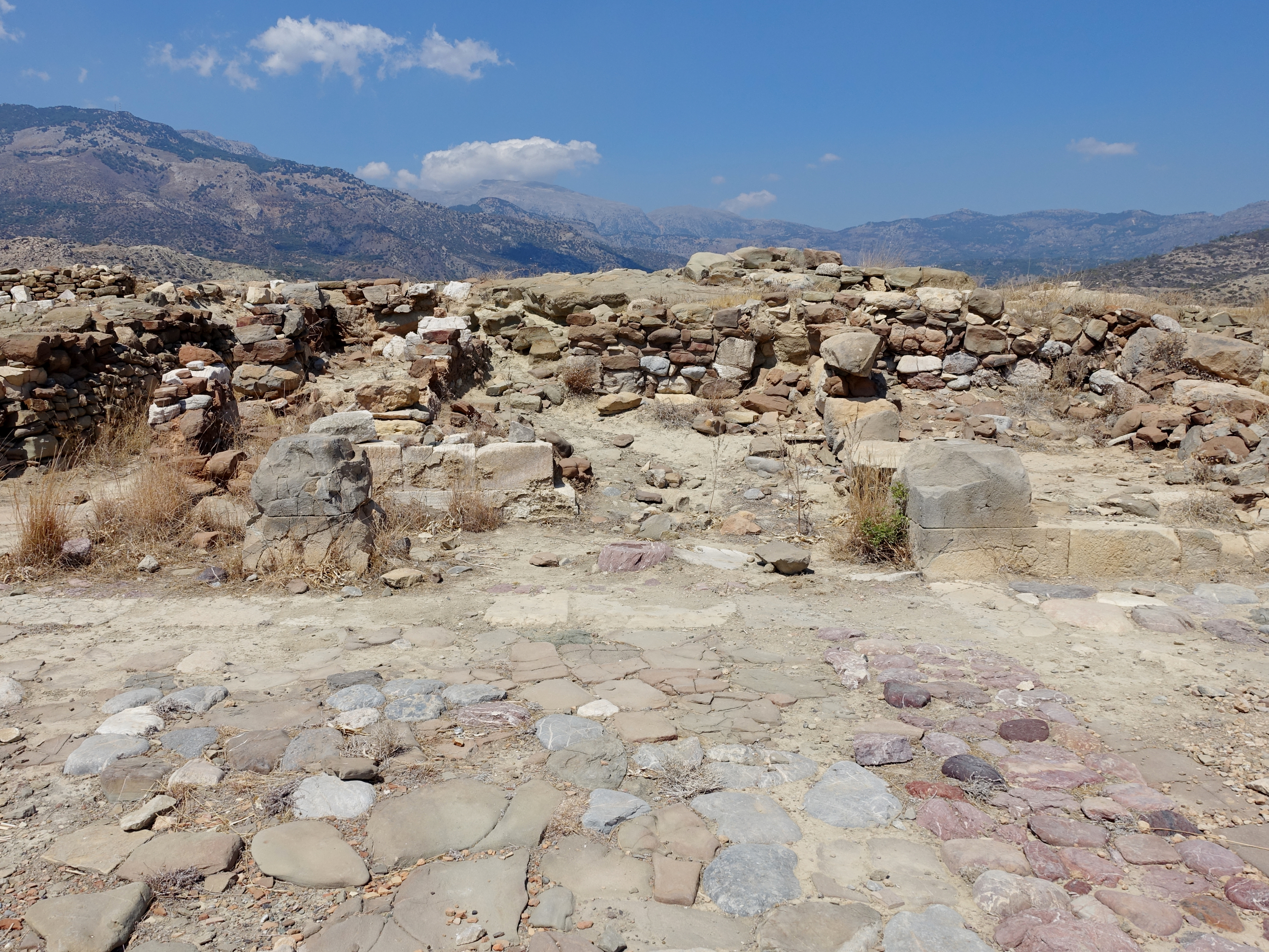
Country House

The country house was built in the Late Minoan Period and was built atop of a hill. Historians theorize the house was built to overlook all of the agriculture and be a building that rules the site. The building had in total 9 rooms. Three of the rooms are thought to be basements for the rooms above. The house is also thought to be three stories tall. Another three of the rooms are thought to be entrances meanwhile the other rooms may have been store rooms. In the artifacts historians found, there is evidence that suggests a shrine being located in the house.

=== Myrtos Pyrgos Tomb ===
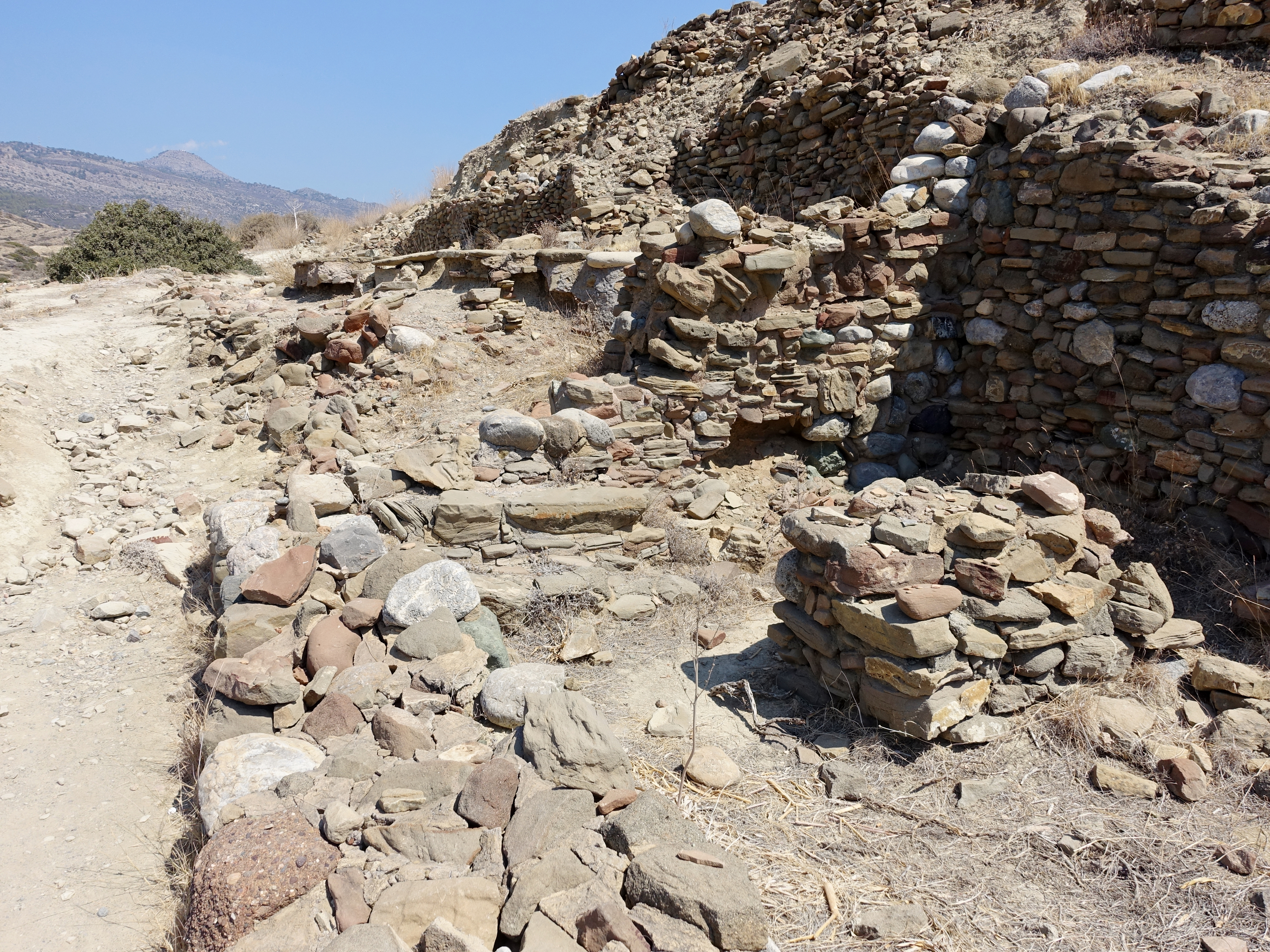
Myrtos Pyrgos Tomb

Inside the tomb, archaeologists found clay vases and cups. This suggests rituals were a practice used by the Minoans. In addition, knives, daggers, and triton shells were also found. The corpses found were thought to be all part of a certain social group as they were all male. The remains are a bit disfigured in their structure. One man has an extra long bone and a young man's skeleton was given the skull of an older man. It is unknown for what specific reason the dead were arranged in this way. While other depositions of men, women, and children were outside of the tomb, it is thought the Myrtos Pyrgos tomb was constructed for powerful figures.

Some archaeologists suggest the Minoans had an idea of a religion due to the placement of the tomb. The tomb is placed on the edge of the settlement but it is still within the settlement. This suggests the Minoans saw tombs as a gateway to the afterlife. In addition, unlike other tombs that have been found at other sites, the Myrtos Pyrgos tomb is monumental and public. This reinforces the idea of the dead in the tomb being of some significance or purpose.

== See also ==
- Minoan civilization
- Minoan religion
- Minoan chronology
- Myrtos
- Fournou Korifi
- Ierapetra
