= Calindoia =

Ancient Bottiaean city in Mygdonia

Coordinates: 40°32′11″N 23°21′51″E

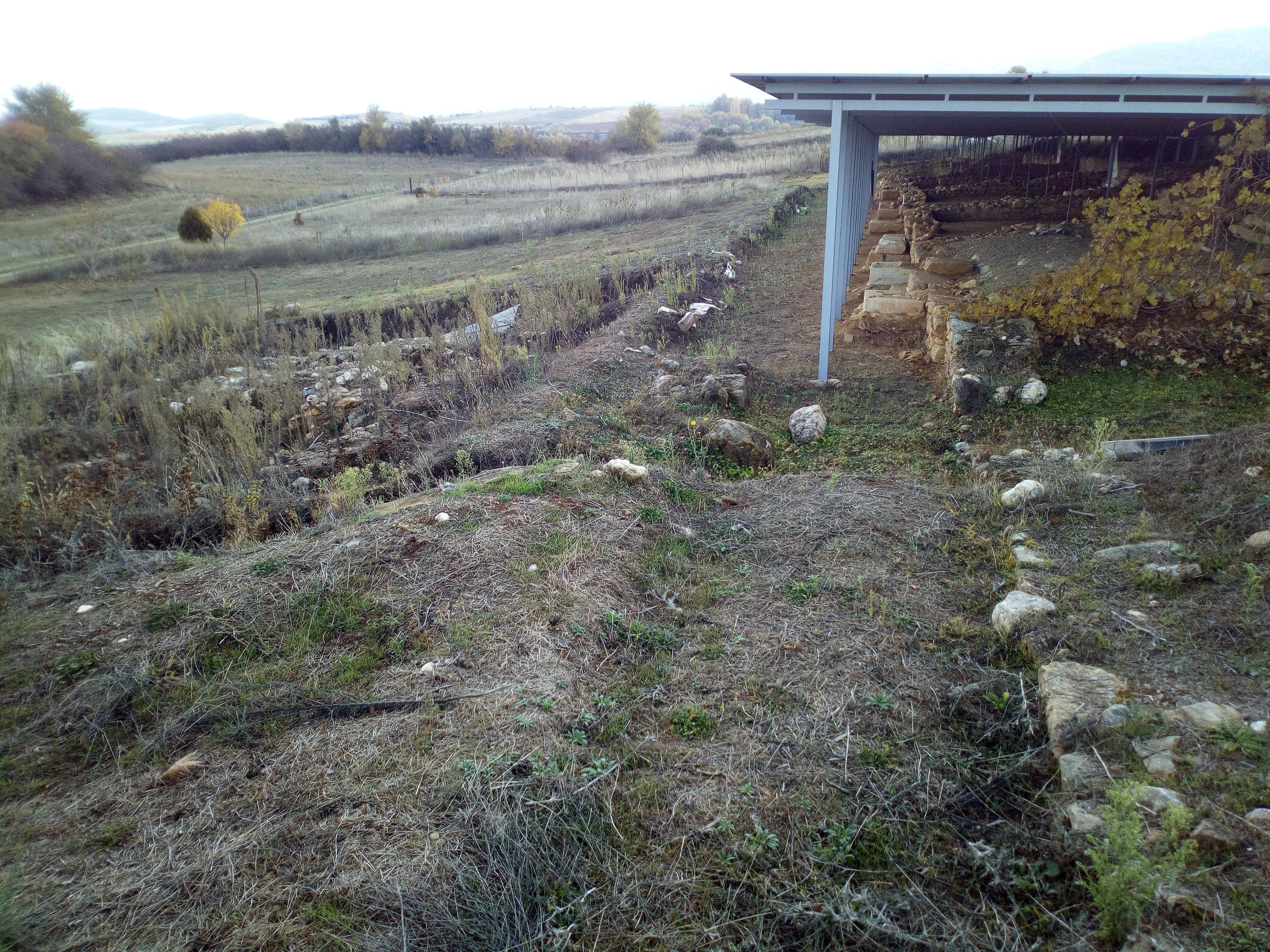
The archaeological site of Calindoia

Calindoia or Kalindoia (Greek: Καλίνδοια) was an ancient Bottiaean city in Mygdonia (modern Thessaloniki regional unit, Kalamoto village). The name also comes down to us in the form Calindaea. The town also bore the names Alindoia and Tripoiai.

Kalindoia is first reported in the Athenian-Bottiaean alliance of 422 BCE and later in the Epidaurian list of Theorodokoi of 360/59 BCE. The name of Theodorokos was Pausanias, possibly the same as Pausanias, the pretender to the Macedonian throne in 368 and 360 BCE. It was refounded as a Macedonian city in the late 4th century BCE. A dedicatory inscription to Apollo was found at Toumbes Kalamotou; it records a list of priests of Asclepius (archpriest Agathanor) who had fulfilled their duties from the time when King Alexander gave Kalindoia to Makedones. Priests of Asclepius were frequently eponymous officials (archontes) in Macedon.

The site of Kalindoia is located near modern Kalamoto, in the community of Nea Kallindoia and the municipal unit of Kallindoia, both of which are named after the ancient city.

== See also ==
- List of ancient Macedonians in epigraphy#Kalindoia decree (c. 335 - 305 BC)
