= Sarakina, Thessaloniki =

Sarakina Σαρακήνα
- Community
- Location within Greece
- Coordinates: 40°35.3′N 23°12.95′E
- Country: Greece
- Administrative region: Central Macedonia
- Regional unit: Thessaloniki
- Municipality: Lagkadas
- Municipal unit: Kallindoia

Area
  - Community: 16.562 km^{2} (6.395 sq mi)
- Elevation: 258 m (846 ft)

Population (2021)
  - Community: 120
  - Density: 7.2/km^{2} (19/sq mi)
- Time zone: UTC+2 (EET)
  - Summer (DST): UTC+3 (EEST)
- Postal code: 570 12
- Area code: +30-2393
- Vehicle registration: NA to NX

Sarakina (Greek: Σαρακήνα) is a village and a community of the Lagkadas municipality. Before the 2011 local government reform it was part of the municipality of Kallindoia, of which it was a municipal district. The 2021 census recorded 120 inhabitants in the community of Sarakina. The community of Sarakina covers an area of 16.562 km^{2}.

== Administrative division ==
The community of Sarakina consists of two separate settlements:

- Agios Charalambos (population 57 in 2021)
- Sarakina (population 63)

== See also ==
- List of settlements in the Thessaloniki regional unit
