= Paul Kuypers =

Dutch agronomist

Paul Herman Felix Kuypers (4 June 1939, Elst (Overbetuwe), Gelderland - d. near Ierapetra, Crete, Greece, 9 September 1971) was a Dutch agriculture expert, widely known in Ierapetra as the "Dutchman". He is credited with introducing new planting techniques first on Syros island and later in Ierapetra, Crete. He arrived in Ierapetra in 1966 and co-operated with local farmers where he introduced greenhouse techniques revolutionizing agricultural production procedures.

He settled in the town of Ierapetra along with his wife and their child. He died in a car accident on the highway near Ierapetra in 1971. Some years after his death the people of Ierapetra erected a bust of him in his memory on the road to Myrtos. The Municipality of Ierapetra dedicated a street to his name.
