= Zagliveri =

Village in Central Macedonia, Greece

Zagliveri Ζαγκλιβέρι
- Community
- Location within Greece
- Coordinates: 40°34.3′N 23°17.3′E
- Country: Greece
- Administrative region: Central Macedonia
- Regional unit: Thessaloniki
- Municipality: Lagkadas
- Municipal unit: Kallindoia

Area
  - Community: 63.224 km^{2} (24.411 sq mi)
- Elevation: 205 m (673 ft)

Population (2021)
  - Community: 1,774
  - Density: 28.06/km^{2} (72.67/sq mi)
- Time zone: UTC+2 (EET)
  - Summer (DST): UTC+3 (EEST)
- Postal code: 570 12
- Area code: +30-2393
- Vehicle registration: NA to NX

Zagliveri (Greek: Ζαγκλιβέρι) is a village and a community of the Lagkadas municipality, in Central Macedonia, Greece. Before the 2011 local government reform it was part of the municipality of Kallindoia, of which it was a municipal district and the seat. The 2021 census recorded 1,774 inhabitants in the village. The community of Zagliveri covers an area of 63.224 km^{2}.

According to the statistics of Vasil Kanchov ("Macedonia, Ethnography and Statistics"), 900 Greek Christians and 260 Turks lived in the village in 1900.

In October 1913, Albanians from Mandritsa (Μανδρίτσα) settled in the village, following a Bulgarian invasion in their home village.

== See also ==
- List of settlements in the Thessaloniki regional unit
