= Peter Warren (archaeologist) =

British archaeologist

- Born: Peter Michael Warren; 23 June 1938 (age 88)
- Awards: Fellow of the Society of Antiquaries (1973); Fellow of the British Academy (1997)

Academic background
- Education: University College of North Wales; Corpus Christi College, Cambridge

Academic work
- Discipline: Archaeology
- Sub-discipline: Aegean Bronze Age
- Institutions: University of Birmingham; University of Bristol

Peter Michael Warren, FSA, FBA (born 23 June 1938) is a British archaeologist and academic, specialising in the Aegean Bronze Age. From 1977 to 2001, he was Professor of Ancient History and Classical Archaeology at the University of Bristol, where he is currently Professor Emeritus and a senior research fellow at the university.

== Early life ==
Warren was born on 23 June 1938. He was educated at Sandbach School, a boys school in Sandbach, Cheshire, and at Llandovery College, a private boys school in Llandovery, Carmarthenshire. He went on to study at the University College of North Wales, from which he graduated Bachelor of Arts (BA). He then undertook post-graduate research at Corpus Christi College, Cambridge and completed his Doctor of Philosophy (PhD) degree.

== Academic career ==
Warren has been involved in a number of excavations. In 1961, he joined Sinclair Hood's excavation of the Royal Road at Knossos. He then remained with Hood for three more trips looking for unknown sites in Crete. Next, he was involved in the British School at Athens excavation of Palekastro for one season and the excavation at Lefkandi for two seasons. Then he led the excavation at Fournou Korifi, Myrtos from 1967 to 1968; the excavation report was completed and published in 1972.

Warren began his academic career at the University of Birmingham. Having completed his doctorate and a number of excavations, he joined Birmingham as a lecturer in 1972. He was promoted to senior lecturer in 1974 and appointed Reader in Aegean Archaeology in 1976. In 1977, he joined the University of Bristol as Professor of Ancient History and Classical archaeology. In addition to his teaching and research at Bristol, he took on a number of administrator posts. He was dean of the Faculty of Arts from 1988 to 1990 and pro-vice-chancellor of the university from 1991 to 1995. He retired from teaching in 2001, becoming professor emeritus, but continued his research as a senior research fellow in archaeology and anthropology.

== Honours ==
On 11 January 1973, Warren was elected Fellow of the Society of Antiquaries of London (FSA). In 1997, he was elected Fellow of the British Academy (FBA).

== Publications ==
- Minoan stone vases (1969)
- Myrtos: An early Bronze Age settlement in Crete (1972)
- Minoan Religion as Ritual Action (1988)
- Aegean Bronze Age chronology (1989)
- The Early Minoan Tombs of Lebena, Southern Crete (2004)
