= Kalamoto =

Kalamoto Καλαμωτό
- Settlement
- Location within Greece
- Coordinates: 40°33.35′N 23°22.5′E
- Country: Greece
- Administrative region: Central Macedonia
- Regional unit: Thessaloniki
- Municipality: Lagkadas
- Municipal unit: Kallindoia
- Community: Nea Kallindoia
- Elevation: 220 m (720 ft)

Population (2021)
  - Total: 398
- Time zone: UTC+2 (EET)
  - Summer (DST): UTC+3 (EEST)
- Postal code: 570 12
- Area code: +30-2393
- Vehicle registration: NA to NX

Kalamoto (Greek: Καλαμωτό) is a village of the Lagkadas municipality. Before the 2011 local government reform it was part of the municipality of Kallindoia. The 2021 census recorded 398 inhabitants in the village. Kalamoto is a part of the community of Nea Kallindoia. The village was founded in the 1960s as the surrounding swamp was drained to provide more farmland. Inhabitants of Aggelochori were relocated to Kalamoto as the new village had access to running water. Kalamoto later gained a power supply in 1970. The inhabitants of Aggelochori mainly descended from Greek refugees from the population exchange with Turkey in 1923 who lived in a village called Aggelochori (modern day Findikli, Gelibolu) on the Gallipoli peninsula.

== See also ==
- List of settlements in the Thessaloniki regional unit
