= Myrtos =

Community in Crete, Greece

Myrtos Μύρτος
- Community
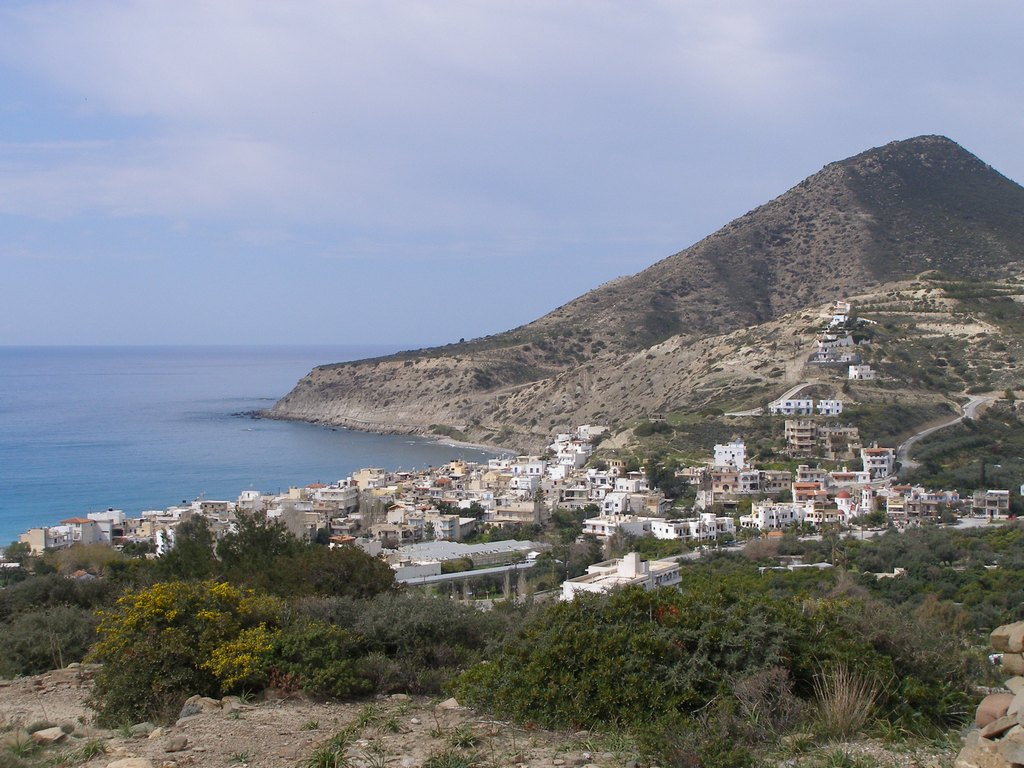

- Location within Greece
- Coordinates: 35°00′13″N 25°35′04″E
- Country: Greece
- Administrative region: Crete
- Regional unit: Lasithi
- Municipality: Ierapetra
- Municipal unit: Ierapetra

Population (2021)
  - Community: 518
- Time zone: UTC+2 (EET)
  - Summer (DST): UTC+3 (EEST)

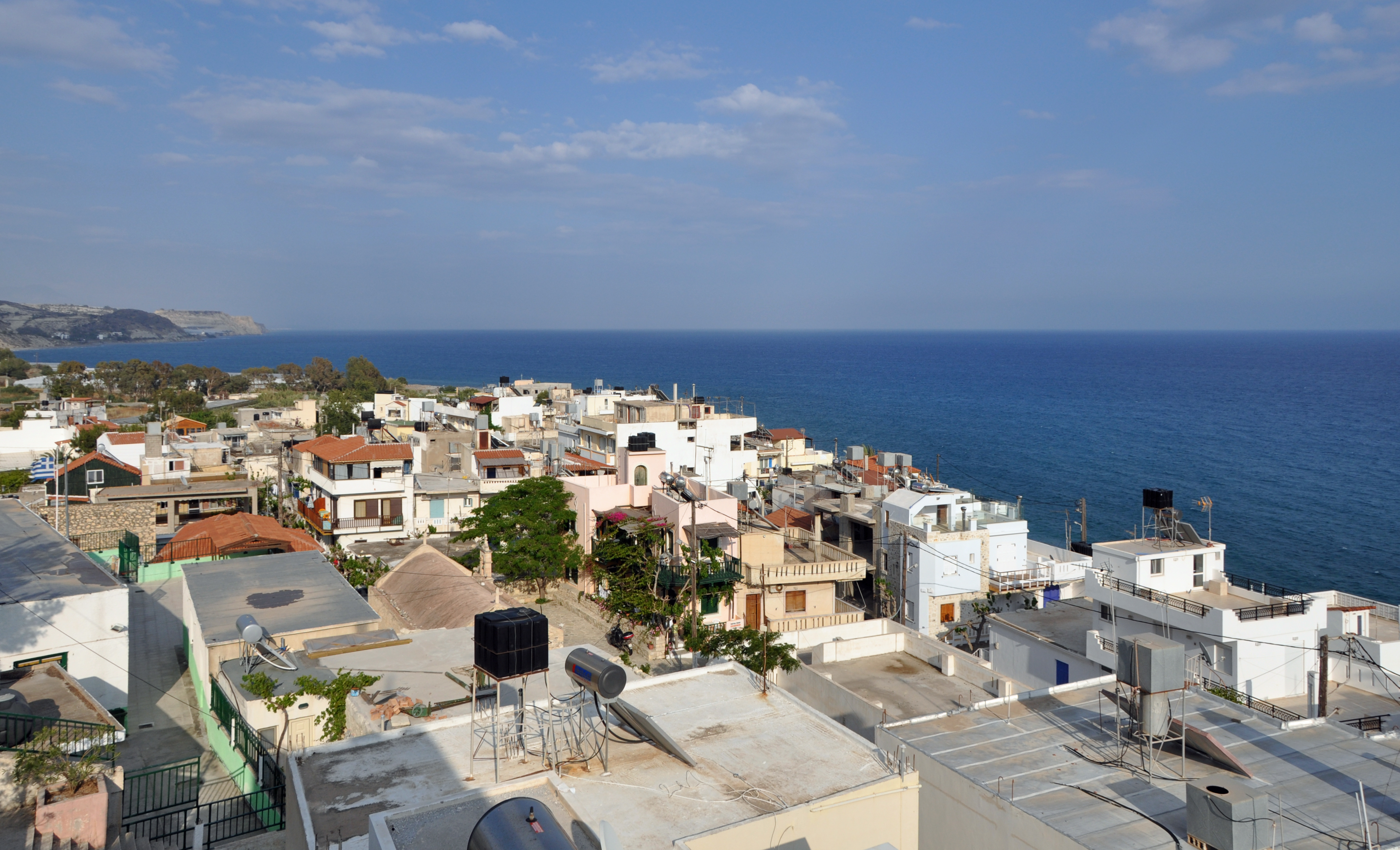
Myrtos: general view

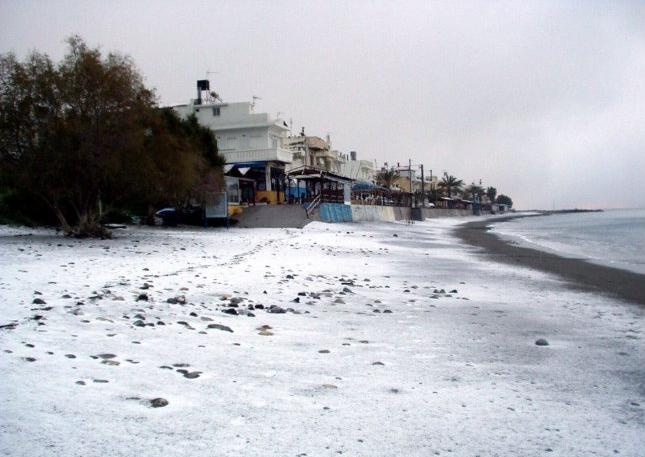
Myrtos, covered with snow, Feb 18 2008.

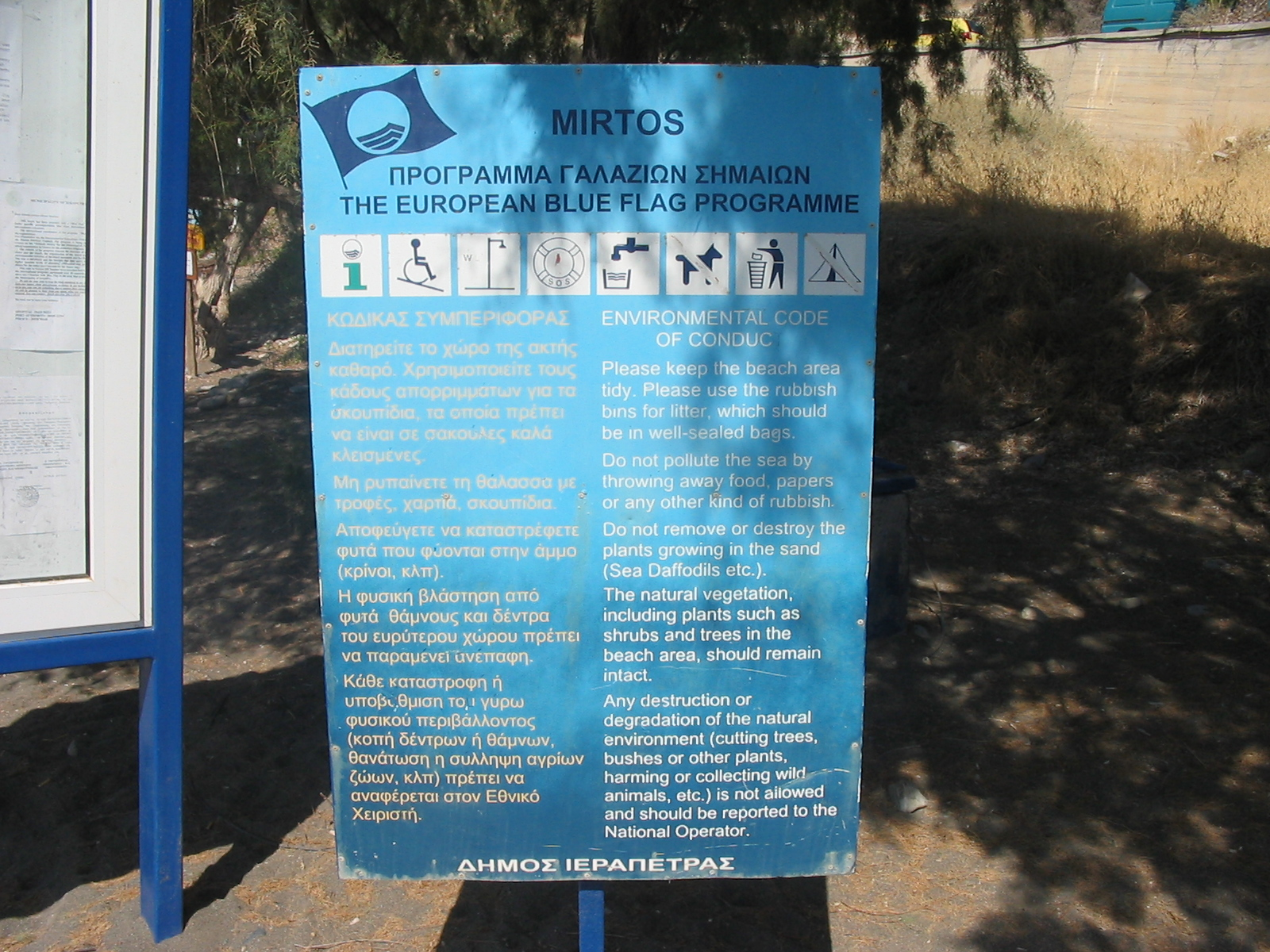
The Blue Flag award.

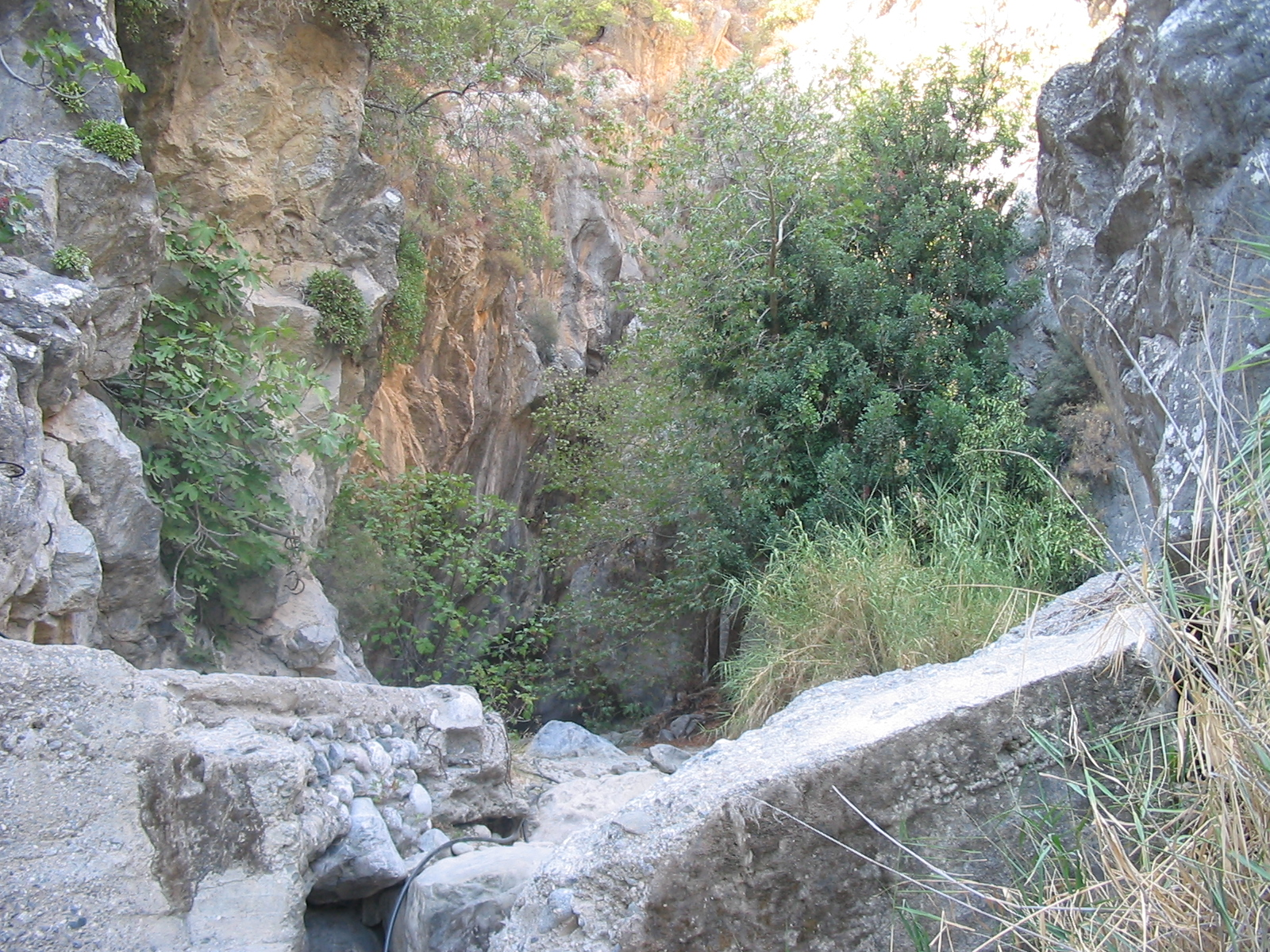
Sarakina Gorge.

Myrtos is a coastal village and a community in the west of the municipality of Ierapetra, in the Regional Unit (previously called prefecture) of Lasithi on the Greek island of Crete. It is located 50 km (31 mi) from Agios Nikolaos and 15 km (9.3 mi) from Ierapetra, on the road to Viannos. A little to the west of the village is the iconic conical Kolektos mountain. Myrtos is situated on the Libyan Sea. The patron saint of the village is Saint Anthony. The population of the community is 518 (2021).

The transliteral spelling of this village is often written as Mirtos.

Myrtos has a rich history but has only prospered with the advent of tourism. The village has many tavernas and diverse shops for both residents and visitors. More recently there is now a pharmacy and an ATM. There are numerous churches, hotels, apartments and studios.

There is a regular bus service between Ierapetra and Myrtos.

== History ==
The area surrounding Myrtos was already inhabited during the Minoan period, but the current village dates from the first half of the twentieth century. Before that, it was the location of a small port, where inhabitants from the higher surrounding areas traded local products that they shipped to Ierápetra. Only when threats from piracy along the Cretan coast diminished and it became safer to live there, did the village of Myrtos develop.

On September 15, 1944, during the Second World War, the inhabitants of Myrtos were ordered by the Nazi-German occupiers to leave the village. Many refused to do so, resulting in the massacre of eighteen inhabitants as a reprisal and the almost complete destruction of the village by fire. There is a monument to commemorate that event which has now been relocated to the periphery of Myrtos adjacent to the Heraklion/Ierapetra highway. Every year on October 28, Ohi Day is commemorated near this monument.

Tourism started at the beginning of the 1970s. Initially, Myrtos was especially popular amongst hippies, but later also 'regular' tourists started to visit the village. Since the 1980s, apartment complexes have been built in Myrtos, but tourism in Myrtos is still relatively small-scale and nowhere near as developed as the tourist centres which are found on the North coast of Crete.

== Climate ==
Myrtos has a subtropical climate. The temperature in Myrtos (as well as in some other areas of southern Crete) is a few degrees higher than in the north, because the northern winds are blocked by the Dikti mountain range (whose highest point is 2,150 metres or 7,050 feet).

The average temperature in the warmest months of the year (July and August) is around 28 °C (82 °F), though sometimes it can exceed 40 °C (105 °F). The temperature during the coldest months of the year (January and February) averages about 13-14 °C (55 °F) but on rare occasions it can also snow in Myrtos.

== The beaches ==
Myrtos has a long beach consisting not just of sand, but also of fine-grained pebbles. The beach has received the "Blue Flag award", which requires the beach to satisfy a number of criteria in order to retain it. The nearby village of Tertsa also has a very long beach. On the two outlying beaches of Tertsa, nudism is tolerated by the authorities.

== Points of interest ==
Myrtos is also the location for two Minoan archaeological sites, at Fournou Korifi and Pyrgos, which provide evidence that the village and its environs have been inhabited since the Neolithic period. There is also a Roman villa, although the ruins are now largely covered or lost due to coastal erosion and local building.

In Myrtos there is a small museum, dedicated to the local history, which features a scale model of Fournou Korifi created by John Atkinson, a British potter resident in the village who is the current museum curator. Near the small village Mithi, about 3 miles (5 km) from Myrtos lies the Sarakina Gorge.

== Economy ==
Of particular importance in increasing the prosperity around Myrtos in the middle of the twentieth century was the Netherlander Paul Kuijpers. After his studies in the Netherlands, he moved to Crete in 1966 and introduced greenhouses in the southern part of the island, as a result of which farmers could harvest all year round and were less dependent on the weather. The areas surrounding Myrtos are still dominated by greenhouses often composed only of wooden frames covered with plastic sheeting. In 1971, Kuijpers was killed in a car accident and a memorial bust in Gra Lighia commemorates his importance for the area.
