= Sarakina Gorge =

Canyon in Greece

Coordinates: 35°03′09″N 25°34′18″E

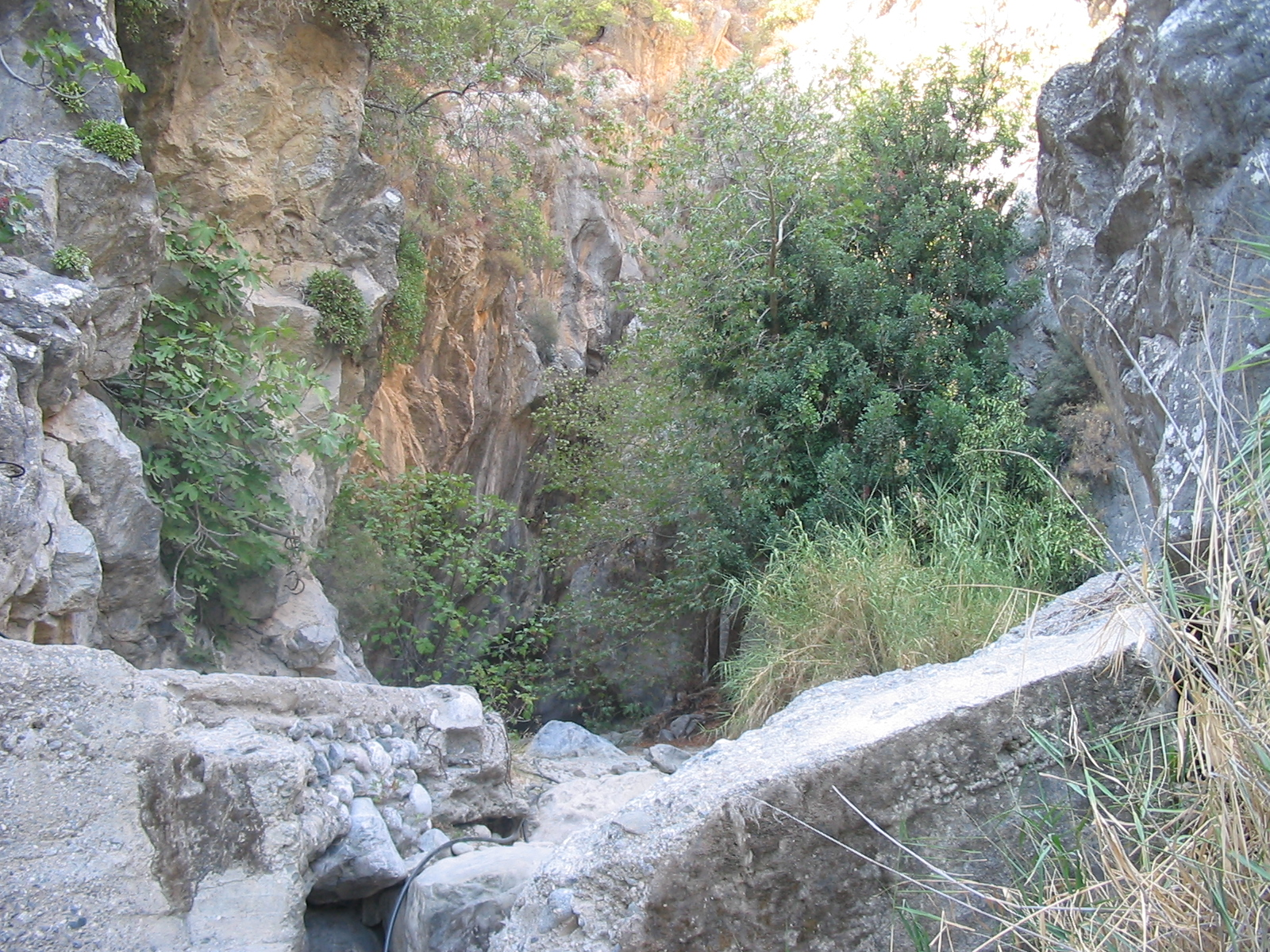
Sarakina Gorge

The Sarakina Gorge (also Myrtos Canyon, after the nearby coastal village of Myrtos) is a canyon in the southeastern part of Crete, Greece. It is located about 15 km west of Ierapetra and a few kilometres upcountry of Myrtos, near the small village of Mithi.

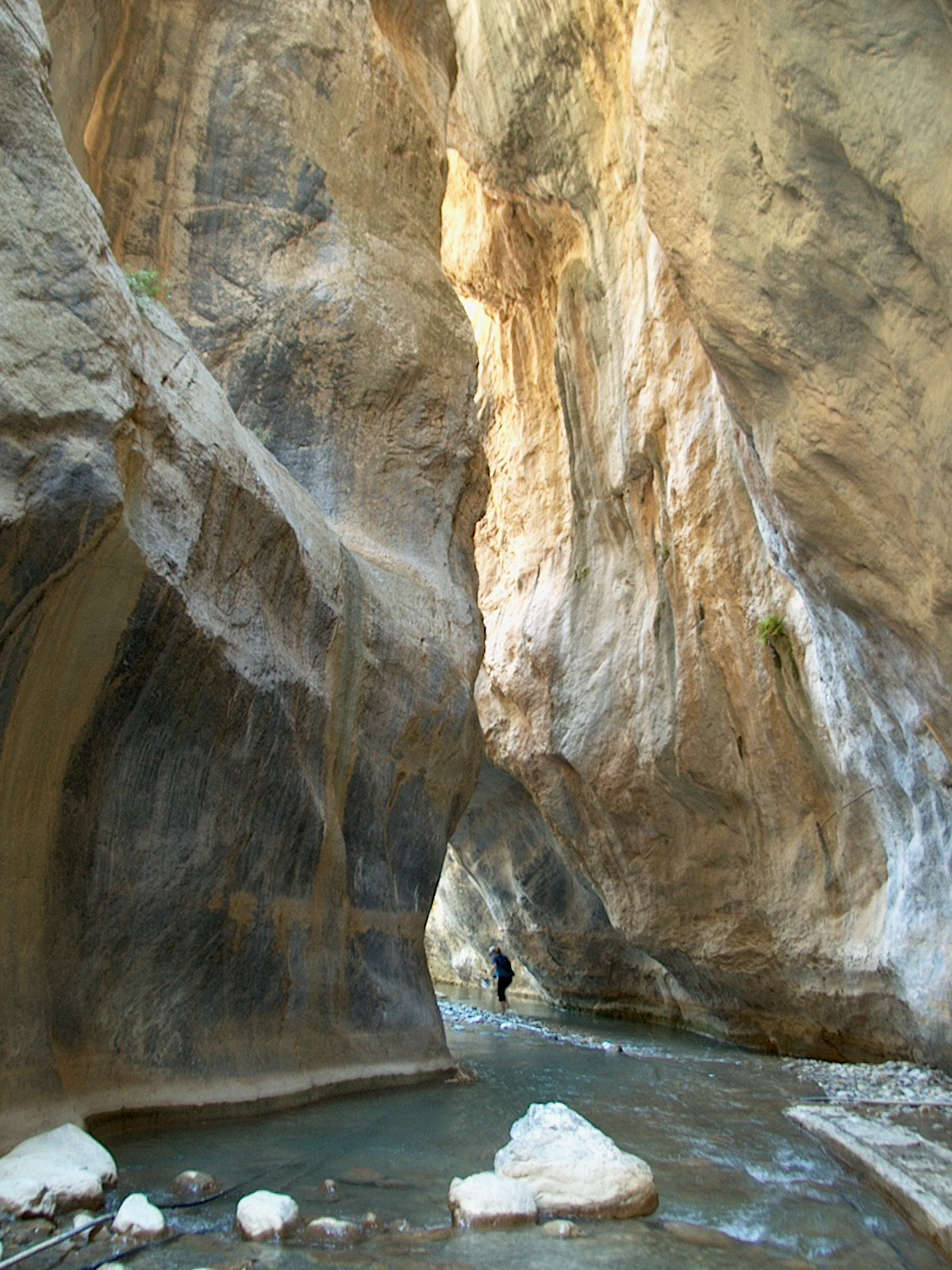
Inside the gorge of Sarakina

== Facts ==
Its length is about 1.5 km and the width between 3 and 10 meters, only at a few point it reaches more. The height of the walls peaks at approximately 150 m. The river of Kriopotamos flows through the gorge, which carries water at varying levels during the year, due to moist winters and arid summers.

== Access and transition ==
The canyon can be accessed from the lower end as well as from the upper end. The lower end of the canyon is somewhat easier to locate, while the canyon's transit from the upper end is easier to manage – the entrance into the canyon is hard to find in both cases, because it was not made touristy accessible yet.

The level of difficulty of a transition is medium, although one single transit takes only about 1 1/2 hours, as you have to walk in the river at some parts and a few stone steps have to be scrambled. Otherwise belaying with a climbing equipment is not necessary.

== See also ==
- Richtis Gorge
- Samaria Gorge
- Ha Gorge
- Imbros Gorge
- Ierapetra
- Dikti Mountains
