= Petrokerasa Folklore Museum =

Museum in Petrokerasa, Greece

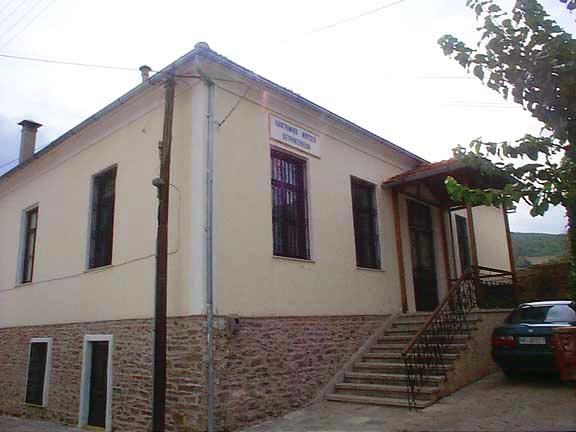
Outside view

The Petrokerasa Folklore Museum (a.k.a. the Folklore Museum of Petrokerasa) is located in the village of Petrokerasa, Thessaloniki, Greece. It is situated in the highlands north of the Chalkidiki peninsula.

The museum was founded in 1976, aiming to preserve and perpetuate the local folk tradition and folk heritage. The museum has four rooms, in which 750 objects exclusively from Petrokerasa are displayed. The first room has weapons (flintlocks, powder magazines, sabres), a large Byzantine oil jar, and the documents granting the village the privilege of hosting a piece of the True Cross on Palm Sunday every year without fail since 1767. In the second room there is a complete loom with all its accessories, together with a variety of woven textiles produced in the village. The third room contains traditional costumes from the village, both men's and women's, contemporary underwear, and all the old ecclesiastical books, codices, and manuscripts relating to the history of the village. In the fourth room tools of various trades and occupations are displayed such as tile-making, carpentry, hunting, beekeeping, viniculture, horse-grooming, and agriculture. Of particular note are a traditional wooden ard or scratch plough, and a metal plough.

== Gallery ==
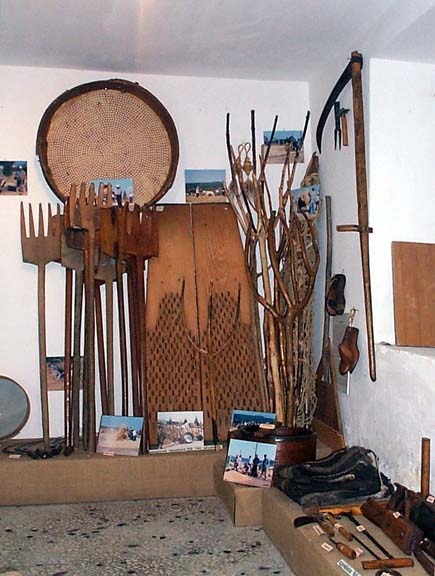
Agricultural implements

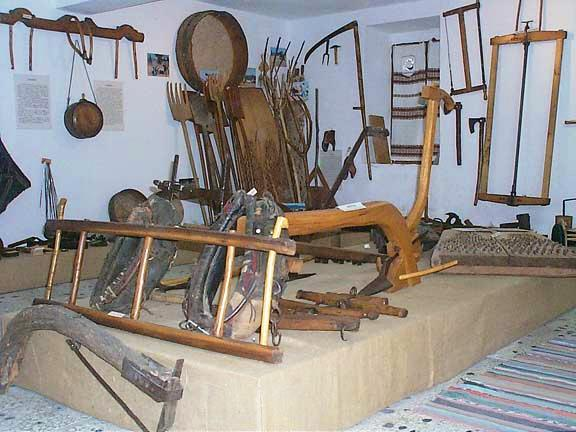
A traditional wooden plough

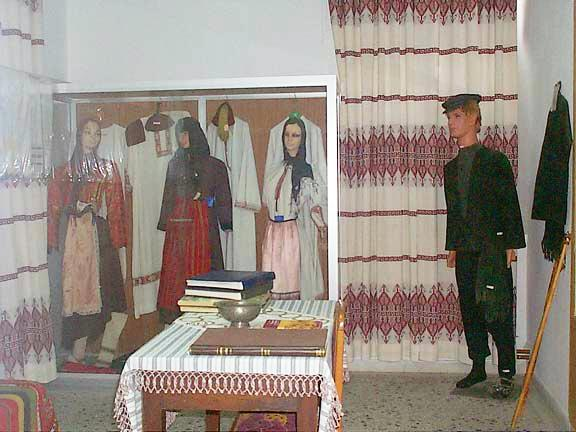
Traditional Costumes

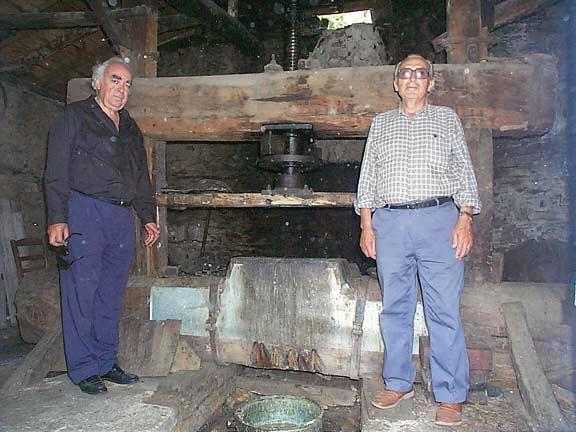
The traditional beeswax workshop

== Sources ==
- This article incorporates text from the corresponding article at the Museums of Macedonia website, commissioned by the Macedonian Heritage foundation, written by Vlasis Vlasidis, and published under a CC-BY-SA-3.0 license.
