= Fournou Korifi =

Archaeological site on Crete

Coordinates: 35.0069°N 25.5901°E

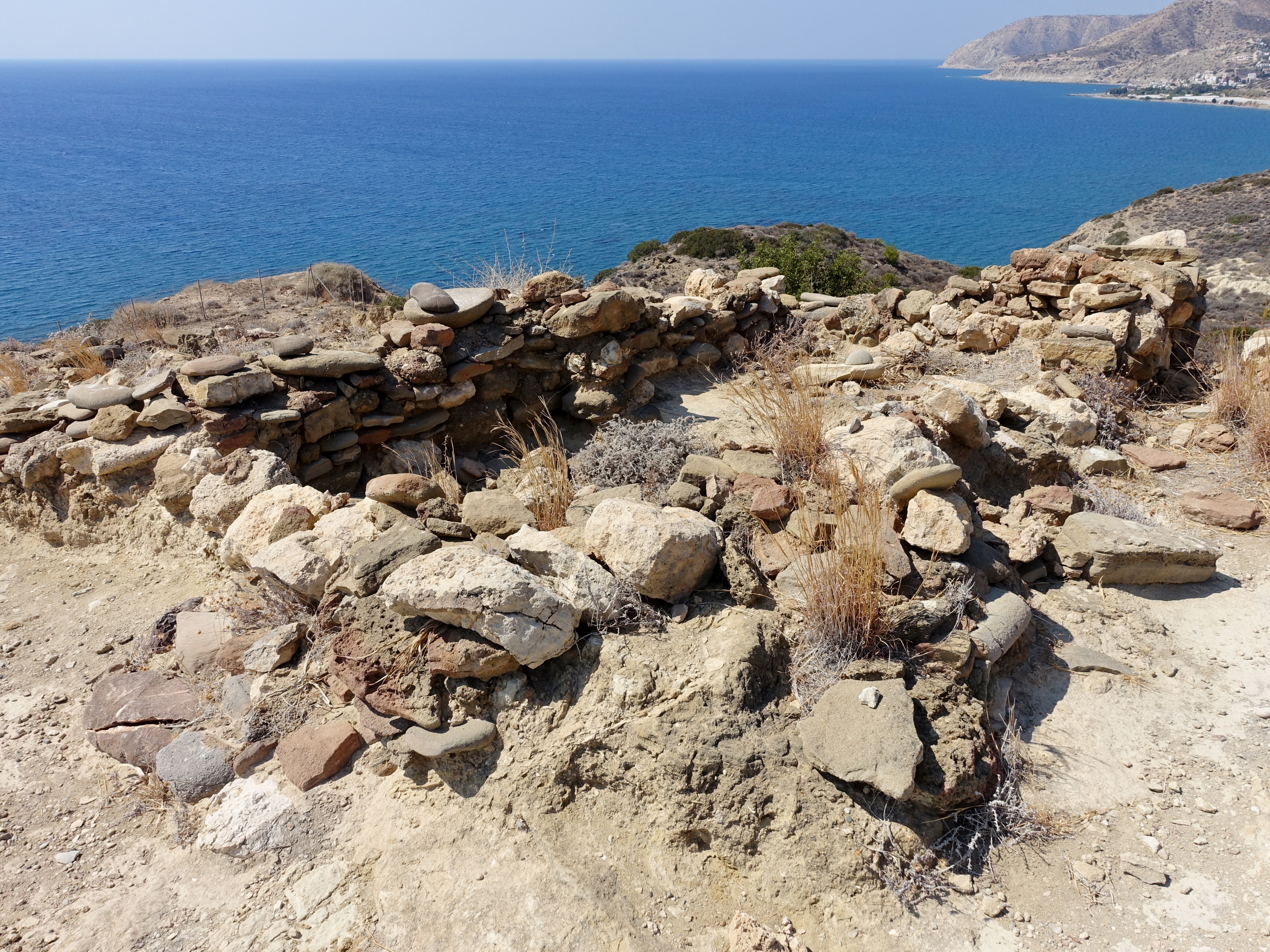
Fournou Korifi

Fournou Korifi is the archaeological site of a Minoan settlement on southern Crete.

== Geography ==
Fournou Korifi was built at the top of a steep hill, with excellent views of the coast.

== Archaeology ==
Fournou Korifi was first excavated in 1967 by Peter Warren. The settlement was in use only during the Early Minoan II period. Among the artefacts excavated were two weaving looms.

Several theories on the interpretation of the 100-room site are available from Peter Warren, Branigan and Todd Whitelaw. Fornou Korfiti, Myrtos is made up of nearly 101 rooms. "All of the rooms and areas are spread over the summit and upper slopes of a steep-sided hill overlooking the [Libyan] sea." The structures were divided into two periods of architecture and ceramics. The remains from period one remains go to the center of the site with the period two settlement around it.

The exact boundaries of the site are being worn away by the natural environment. Despite this fact it does not seem that there was much of an extension for the settlement itself. "Based on an assessment of the effect of the erosion says that most of the site should be ameable to detailed analysis." The various preserved artifacts in the southern portion of the site are the most useful in spotting archaeological distribution patterns but other preserved artifacts in the northern part of the site prove comparable configurations.
