= Kallindoia =

Kallindoia Καλλίνδοια
- Municipal unit
- Location within the regional unit

- Location within Greece
- Coordinates: 40°34′N 23°17′E
- Country: Greece
- Administrative region: Central Macedonia
- Regional unit: Thessaloniki
- Municipality: Lagkadas

Area
  - Municipal unit: 154.748 km^{2} (59.749 sq mi)
- Elevation: 248 m (814 ft)

Population (2021)
  - Municipal unit: 2,980
  - Municipal unit density: 19.3/km^{2} (49.9/sq mi)
- Time zone: UTC+2 (EET)
  - Summer (DST): UTC+3 (EEST)
- Postal code: 570 12
- Area code: +30-2393
- Vehicle registration: NA to NX

Kallindoia (Greek: Καλλίνδοια) is a former municipality in the Thessaloniki regional unit, Greece. Since the 2011 local government reform it is part of the municipality Lagkadas, of which it is a municipal unit. The 2021 census recorded 2,980 inhabitants in the municipal unit. The municipal unit of Kallindoia covers an area of 154.748 km^{2}. The seat of the municipality was in Zagliveri. It is named after the ancient city of Kalindoia, which is located in the municipal unit.

== See also ==
- List of settlements in the Thessaloniki regional unit
- Petrokerasa Folklore Museum
