= Kolchiko =

Kolchiko Κολχικό
- Community
- Location within Greece
- Coordinates: 40°45.4′N 23°8′E
- Country: Greece
- Administrative region: Central Macedonia
- Regional unit: Thessaloniki
- Municipality: Lagkadas
- Municipal unit: Lagkadas

Area
  - Community: 45.449 km^{2} (17.548 sq mi)
- Elevation: 140 m (460 ft)

Population (2021)
  - Community: 1,768
  - Density: 38.90/km^{2} (100.8/sq mi)
- Time zone: UTC+2 (EET)
  - Summer (DST): UTC+3 (EEST)
- Postal code: 572 00
- Area code: +30-2394
- Vehicle registration: NA to NX

Kolchiko (Greek: Κολχικό) is a village and a community of the Lagkadas municipality. Before the 2011 local government reform it was part of the municipality of Lagkadas, of which it was a municipal district. The 2021 census recorded 1,768 inhabitants in the community of Kolchiko. The community of Kolchiko covers an area of 45.449 km^{2}.

== Administrative division ==
The community of Kolchiko consists of two separate settlements (2021 populations):

- Drakontio (population 217)
- Kolchiko (population 1,551)

== See also ==
- List of settlements in the Thessaloniki regional unit
