= Drakontio =

Drakontio Δρακόντιο
- Settlement
- Location within Greece
- Coordinates: 40°44.2′N 23°9.5′E
- Country: Greece
- Administrative region: Central Macedonia
- Regional unit: Thessaloniki
- Municipality: Lagkadas
- Municipal unit: Lagkadas
- Community: Kolchiko
- Elevation: 140 m (460 ft)

Population (2021)
  - Total: 217
- Time zone: UTC+2 (EET)
  - Summer (DST): UTC+3 (EEST)
- Postal code: 572 00
- Area code: +30-2394
- Vehicle registration: NA to NX

Drakontio (Greek: Δρακόντιο) is a village of the Lagkadas municipality. The 2021 census recorded 217 inhabitants in the village. Drakontio is a part of the community of Kolchiko.

== See also ==
- List of settlements in the Thessaloniki regional unit
