= Pasadena Tournament of Roses Association =

Organization that operates the Tournament of Roses parade

- Founded: 1890
- Type: Non-profit Organization
- Purpose: Rose Bowl Game, Rose Parade
- Location(s): Tournament House; Pasadena, California
- Region served: Southern California and worldwide television audience
- Key people: Terry Madigan, President, Mark Leavens, Past President, David Eads, Chief Executive Officer
- Volunteers: 935 members
- Website: tournamentofroses.com

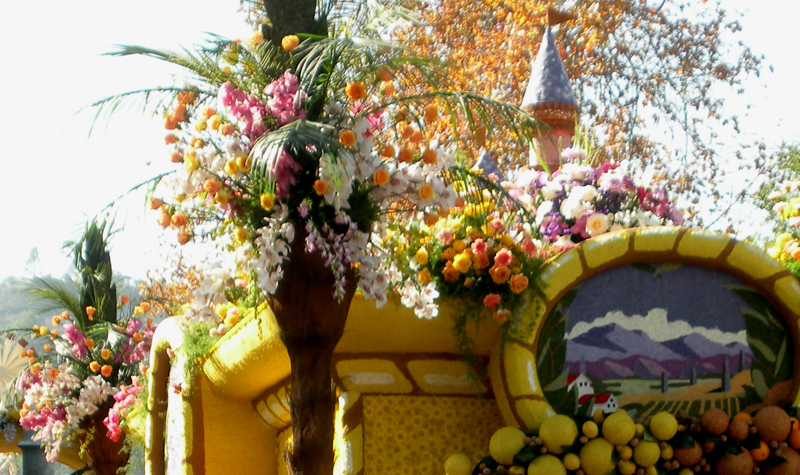
Flowers on a 2009 Rose Parade float

Pasadena Tournament of Roses Association, created by the efforts of Charles Frederick Holder and Francis F. Rowland, is the non-profit organization that has annually produced the Rose Parade on New Year's Day since 1890 and the Rose Bowl since 1902. "America's New Year Celebration" is "a festival of flowers, music and equestrians and sports unequaled anywhere in the world", according to the Tournament of Roses. The association has 935 volunteer members and the members spend some 80,000 combined work-hours to stage the events.

The 2021 Rose Parade was cancelled due to the COVID-19 pandemic.

== Membership ==
Members of the Pasadena Tournament of Roses Association are people from the community. When they join, they are between the ages of 21 and 66, live or work within 15 miles of Pasadena City Hall, and are willing to work on New Year's Eve and New Year's Day. They must have "a reputation for integrity, reliability, dependability, commitment and dedication". Members are required to devote the time and effort to perform the designated task at the time required. They are interested in community service, as evidenced by involvement in professional, civic, service, political and community organizations, according to the association.

During the Parade, many tournament members are required to wear distinctive white suits, with a red tie, a name tag, a membership pin and an official ribbon. Because of this, the volunteers are commonly referred to as "white suiters". In December each year, a fleet of white vehicles, provided by American Honda, with special "T of R" license plates, is seen throughout the San Gabriel Valley.

== Tournament House ==
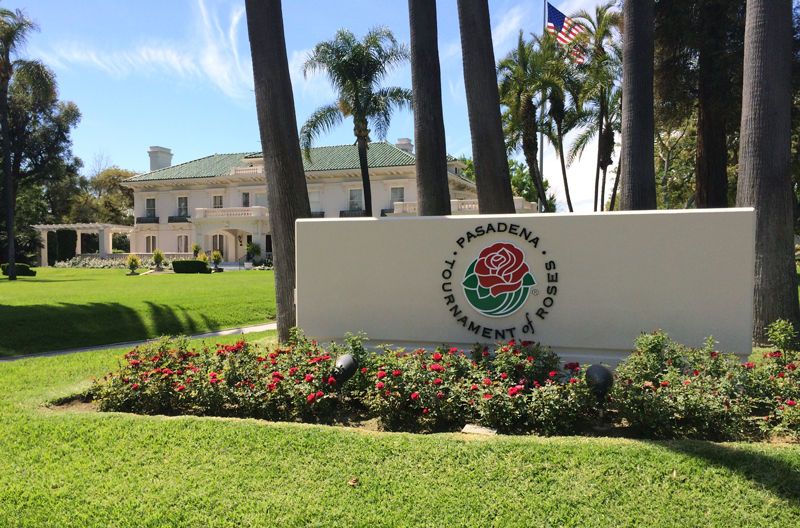
Tournament House

Tournament House is the name given to the building where the organization is headquartered. The Tournament House (formerly a Wrigley Mansion) and the Wrigley Gardens are located on South Orange Grove Boulevard, Pasadena, California. The structure, a stately Italian Renaissance-style mansion designed by architect George Lawrence Stimson, was once owned by William Wrigley Jr., the chewing gum magnate. After Mrs. Wrigley's death in 1958, the property was presented to the City of Pasadena with the condition that the house become the permanent base of operations for the Tournament of Roses.

Today, the five bedrooms of the second floor are used for committee meetings, as well as serving as a dressing area for the Rose Court and space for display of the Tournament of Roses history. There are displays of trophies, past Rose Bowl Games, Grand Marshals, Presidents, and Queens and Courts. Of interest is an original panel of Peanuts comic strip for January 1, 1974, when its creator Charles M. Schulz served as the Grand Marshal. On the panel, Lucy was watching the parade on TV and was telling Linus van Pelt that "They have some of the most beautiful floats this year I've ever seen." When Linus asked about the grand marshal, Lucy said, "Yeah, you missed him...but he wasn't anyone you ever heard of!"

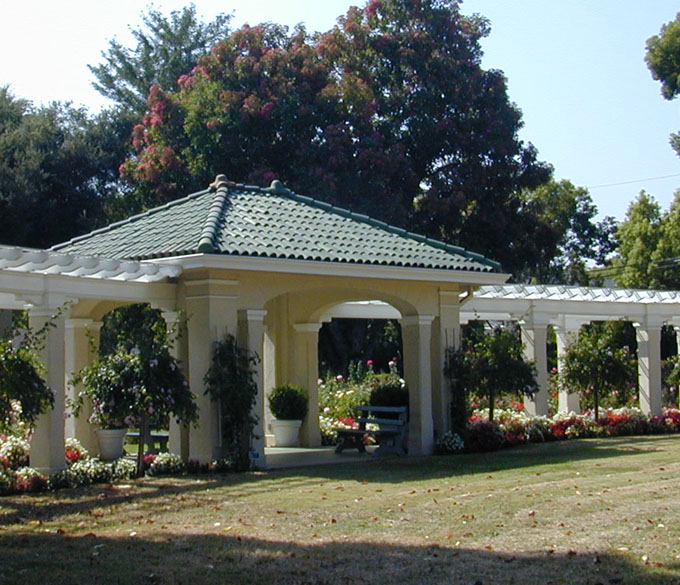
The Rose Garden at the Tournament House

The house was built for real estate and dry goods tycoon George Stimson, designed by his architect son G. Lawrence Stimson. After construction was completed of this house on "Millionaires' Row" in 1914, Mr. Stimson sold it to the Wrigleys for $170,000. A year later, the adjacent gardens were bought for $25,000.

The Association maintains the grounds of the Tournament House, and volunteers from the Pacific Rose Society care for the rose gardens. There are hundreds of varieties of roses, camellias, and annuals planted at the All-America Rose Selections' test gardens. The gardens are open to the public throughout the year, except for December 31 through January 2.

== Leadership ==
Each year, the president announces a parade theme in January and chooses a Grand Marshal during the year. With the announcement of the theme, the preparation and construction of the floral floats begin, along with the selection of marching bands and equestrian units.

Terry Madigan is the president since January 2026, leading the 14-member executive committee. The parade and bowl game were held on January 1, 2026 with the theme The Magic of Teamwork under the leadership of Mark Leavens. The theme for the 2025 parade was Best Day Ever!. Ed Morales was the president for 2024-2025 parade year. Alex Aghajanian was the president for the 2024 parade and his theme was Celebrating a World of Music: The Universal Language. Previously, Amy Wainscott was confirmed as the president for the 2023 Rose Parade. Her theme was Turning The Corner.

David Eads is the Tournament of Roses executive director, taking over from William B. Flinn, who retired from the organization following the parade on January 2, 2017.

== Committees ==
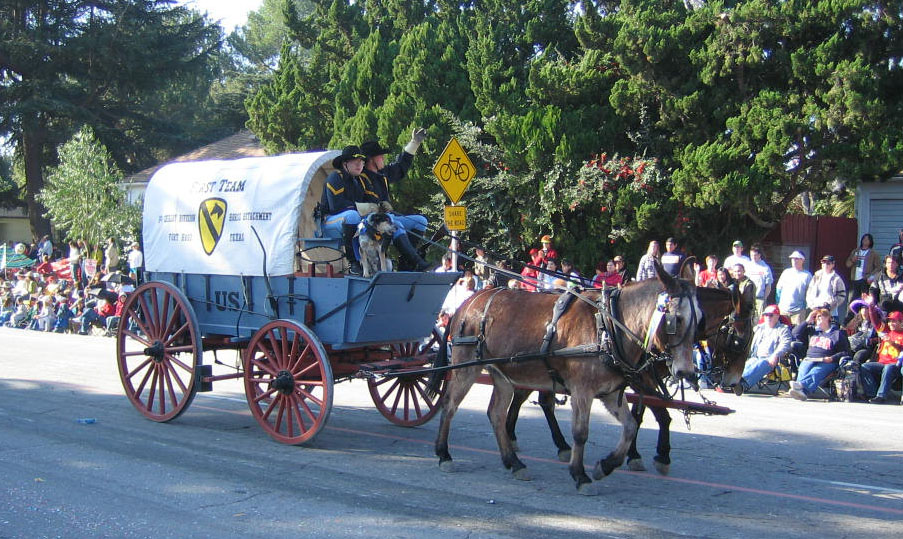
1st Cavalry U.S. Army, Fort Hood, Texas, at the 2007 Rose Parade

According to the association, members are "assigned to one of the 32 committees, with responsibilities ranging from selecting Parade participants to directing visitors on New Year's Day, to serving hamburgers to band members at the end of the Parade route, to giving presentations about the Tournament to community groups"."

Some of the committees are:

- Executive Committee – fourteen members overseeing the entire operation and is the main policy making body of the association
- Formation Area – take charge of the staging area before the start of the parade
- Parade Operations – run the parade, escort the floats, and man the parade route
- Post Parade – take charge of the floats after the parade and operate the post parade viewing event
- Decorating Places – manage the viewing at construction sites, allowing the public to view the floats at the various sites prior to the parade
- Equestrian – selecting the participating equestrian units, stage Equesfest at L.A. Equestrian Center, and insert the units into the parade line-up
- Float Construction – overseeing the complete construction and testing of the floats
- Football – in charge of the Rose Bowl Game, including the selection of participating schools and the Hall of Fame ceremony
- Music – help select the participating bands from around the country and the world, stage the Bandfest shows at Pasadena City College, and insert the marching bands into the parade
- Queen and Court – manage the tryouts, select the Queen and Princesses, and coordinate the various activities of the Rose Court
- Coronation – handles the arrangements for the Queen and Court coronation ceremony
- Alumni/Social Media
- Judging – selection of Rose Parade float judges and announces float award winners before the start of the parade
- Television and radio – serves as a liaison to radio and television broadcasters
- Liaison & planning – acts as a liaison to governmental agencies
- Festival – provides support to the Sip & Savor, Rose Bowl Bash and Youth Empowerment Forum

== Queen and Rose Court ==
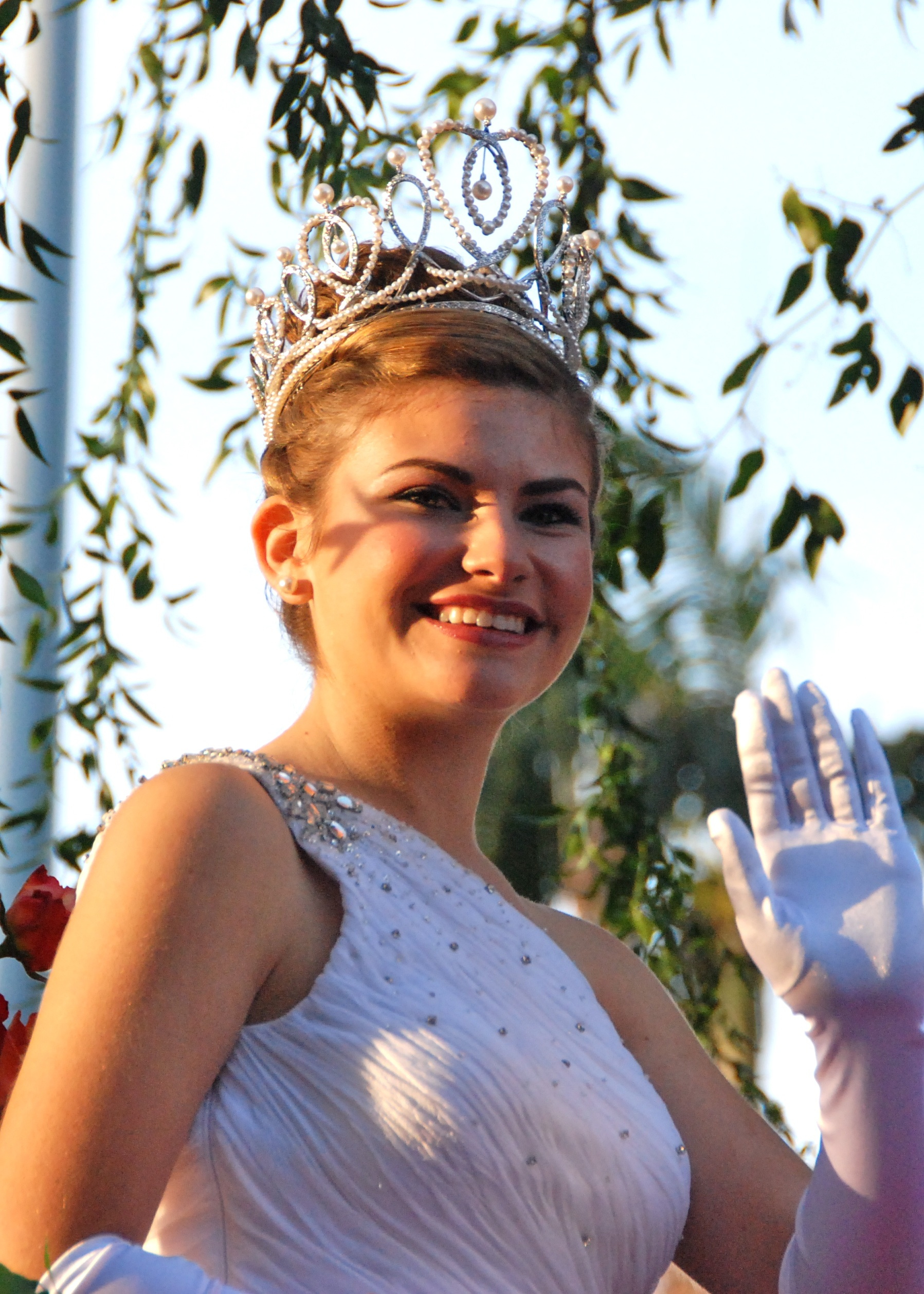
Natalie Innocenzi, 2010 Rose Queen

Each September, some 1,000 young women (and a few young men) between the ages of 17 and 21, interview for the honor of serving as a member of the Tournament of Roses Rose Court. The Pasadena Tournament of Roses administers a selection process to determine which greater Pasadena-area young women will have the honor of being crowned Queen of the Tournament of Roses, or more commonly known as Rose Queen. In addition to one Rose Queen, six Rose Princesses will also be selected to make up the Rose Court. To be eligible for the Rose Court, applicants must be an unmarried, female resident of the Pasadena City College district, be a senior in high school or enrolled as a full-time student any accredited school or college in the Pasadena City College district, possess at least a 2.0 grade point average, and be at least 17 years of age by December 31 of the current year and not more than 21 years of age before January 5 of the next year.

The Rose Court will then ride on a specially designed float in the Rose Parade, and become ambassadors of the Tournament of Roses, mainly during its duration and prelude. The Rose Court members will attend over one hundred events in the Southern California area and preside over the Rose Bowl Game.

The first Rose Queen, Hallie Woods, was chosen by her classmates at Pasadena High School in 1905. She made her own gown and helped decorate the float upon which she rode.

== Grand marshal ==
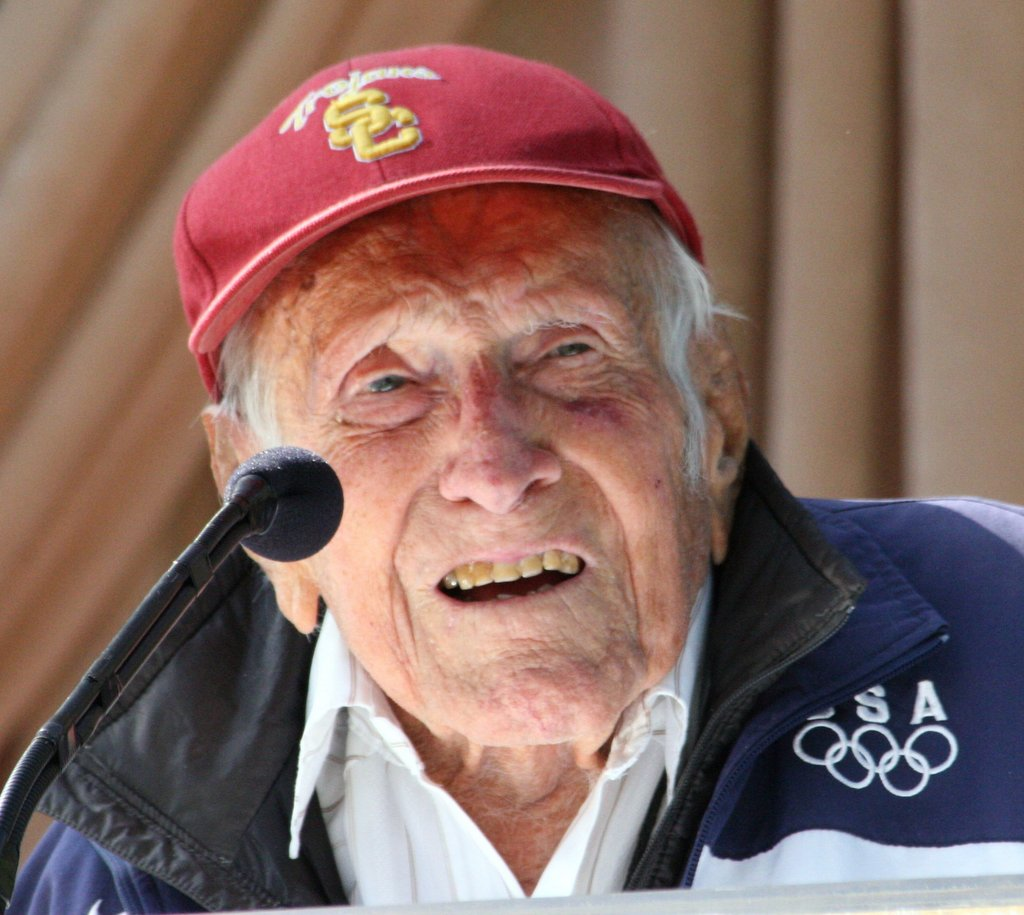
2015 Grand Marshal designee Louis Zamperini, who died on July 2, 2014

The Rose Parade has had some of the world's most distinguished individuals serving as Grand Marshal, which included actors, astronauts, writers, artists, athletes and political figures. Traditionally, the grand marshal rides in the Rose Parade and tosses the official game coin for the Rose Bowl Game.

Grand Marshal Shirley Temple is recognized as the youngest grand marshal to have served over the Tournament of Roses. She presided over the 50th anniversary Rose Parade celebration in 1939. Other notable grand marshals included Bob Hope, Chief Justice Earl Warren, actress Carol Burnett, George Lucas, Bill Cosby, James Stewart, Kermit the Frog, Mickey Mouse, Justice Sandra Day O'Connor, former Presidents Richard M. Nixon, Gerald R. Ford, and Dwight D. Eisenhower.

The 2016 Rose Parade grand marshal is American filmmaker Ken Burns. Louis Zamperini was chosen for the 2015 Rose Parade. After his passing on July 2, 2014, the Tournament of Roses announced that it was "committed to honoring him as the Grand Marshal of the 2015 Rose Parade." Vin Scully served as Grand Marshal of the 2014 Rose Parade and Rose Bowl Game.

== Rose Bowl Game ==
The Rose Bowl Game was added in 1902 to help fund the cost of the parade. The 1902 "East-West" football game was between The University of Michigan and Stanford University. The final score was Michigan, 49; Stanford, 0. The game was next played in 1916 and has been played annually since then.

Since 1923, except for 1942 in Durham, North Carolina and 2021 in Arlington, Texas, the game has been played in the Rose Bowl stadium, which was completed in that year. The USC Trojans and Penn State Nittany Lions were the competing teams that year. USC won the game, 14–3. In 2002, the first BCS National Championship Game was held on January 3 at the Rose Bowl stadium.

The Tournament of Roses hosted both the traditional Rose Bowl Game presented by Citi and the Citi BCS National Championship Game in 2010. Vizio became the new presenting sponsor beginning with the 2011 Rose Bowl Game. The 2014 Rose Bowl Game will mark its 100th college bowl game. The January 1, 2015 Rose Bowl game will be a semifinal game of the College Football Playoff, replacing the BCS.

The original Rose Bowl stadium was built in a horseshoe shape, open on the south end, for $272,198.26. It had a capacity of 57,000. Beginning in January 2011, the stadium completed a $152 million renovation project.

== Awards and honors ==
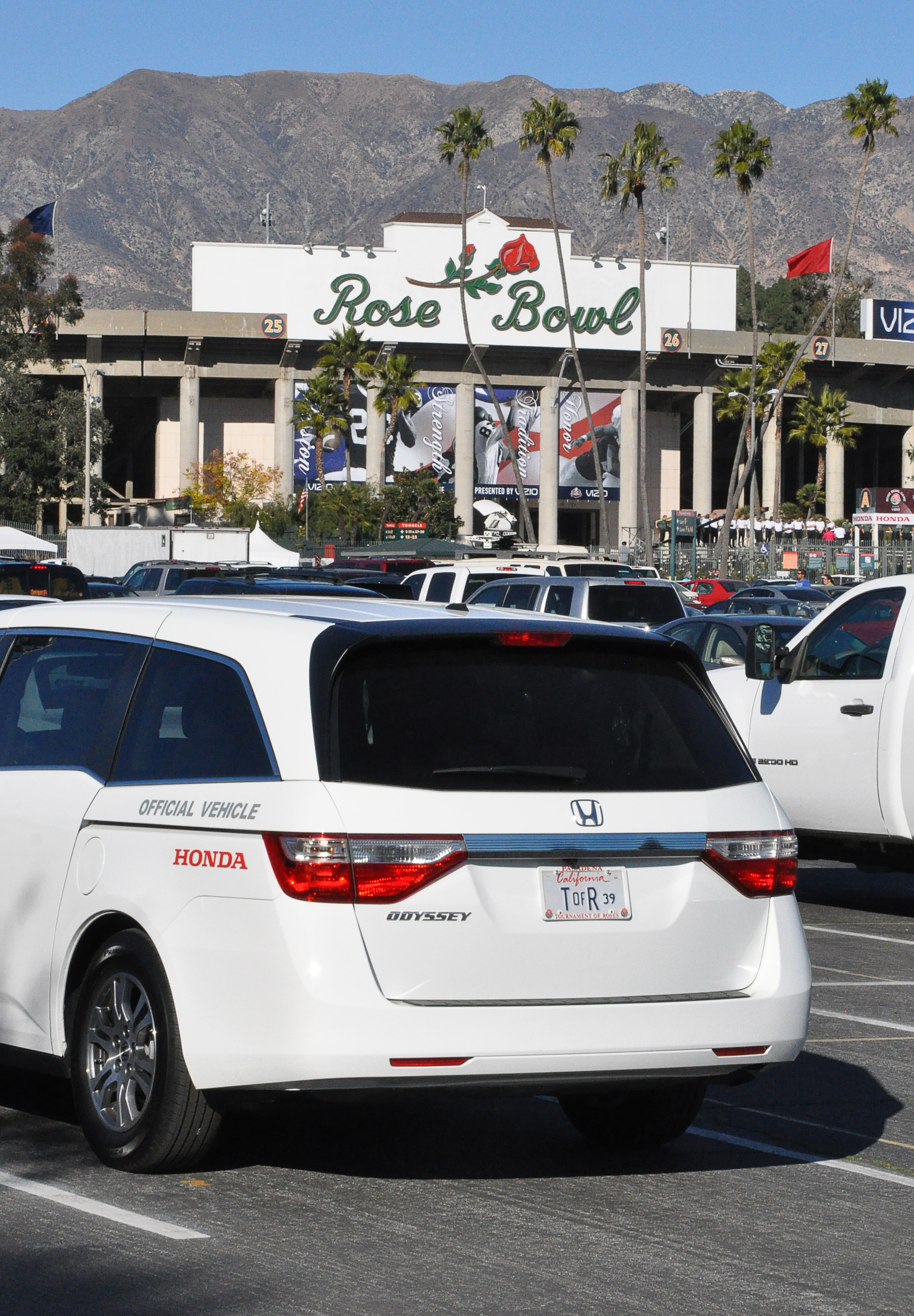
State-issued "T of R" license plate

- 2009 – Los Angeles Area Governors Award, Academy of Television Arts & Sciences (six decades of broadcasting achievements)
- 2010 – International Festivals and Events Association (IFEA) Haas Wilkerson Pinnacle Awards (Gold, Best Full-Length TV Program (national), 2010 Rose Parade on ABC; Gold, Best Cover Design, 2010 Citi BCS National Championship Game Official Souvenir Program).

== Tournament of Roses Foundation ==
The Tournament of Roses Foundation was created in 1983 as the charity arm of the Association. Since its inception in 1983, the Foundation has invested over $5.5 million in more than 800 Pasadena-area organizations.

== See also ==
- Cal Poly Universities Rose Float
- Rose Parade
- Tournament of Roses floats
- Valley Hunt Club
