= Queen of the Rose Parade =

Annually selected by California organization

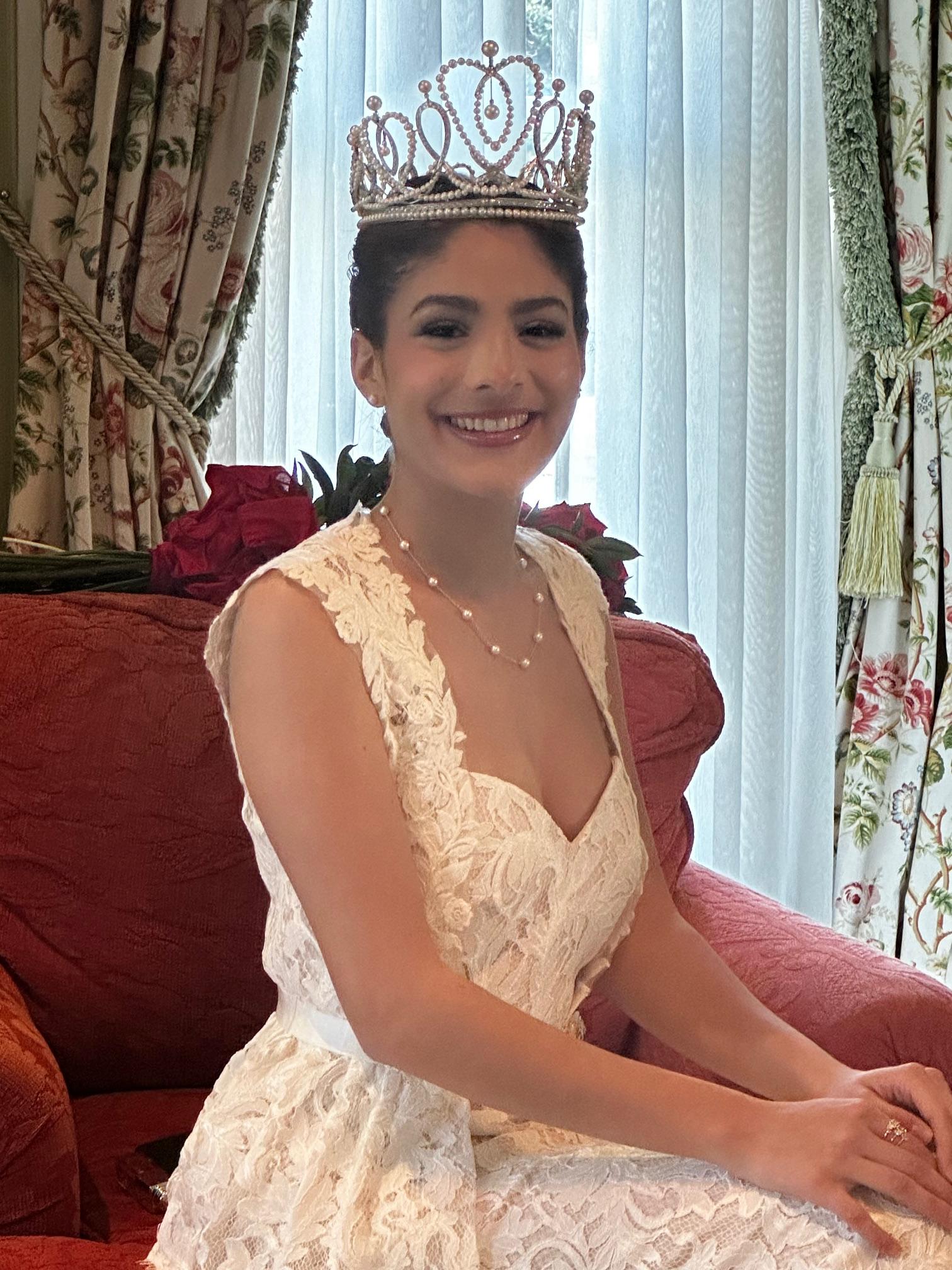
2024 Queen Naomi Stillitano

Queen of the Tournament of Roses, more commonly known as "Rose Queen", consists of young woman selected for the annual Pasadena Tournament of Roses in California, United States. Six Rose Princesses are also selected to make up the Rose Court. The Rose Court rides on a float in the Rose Parade, and becomes ambassadors.

== Qualifications and selection process ==
Each September, approximately 1,000 young women between the ages of 17 and 21 interview to serve as a member of the Tournament of Roses Rose Court. To be eligible, applicants must be a female resident of the Pasadena City College district, which include Pasadena, Altadena, La Cañada Flintridge, South Pasadena, San Marino, Sierra Madre, Arcadia, Temple City, the northern portion of Rosemead and the western portion of El Monte. Starting with the 2025 Rose Parade, the cities of Alhambra and San Gabriel and the Los Angeles neighborhoods of Eagle Rock, Highland Park, Monterey Hills and El Sereno were included as part of the geographic expansion plan. Applicants must be currently enrolled as a 12th grade senior in high school or as a full-time college student (minimum 12 units) in any accredited high school or college in the Pasadena City College district, Alhambra Unified School District, San Gabriel Unified School District or Los Angeles Unified School District, possess at least a 2.0 grade point average in the current year's and previous year's course work, and be at least 17 years of age by December 31 of the current year and not more than 21 years of age before January 5 of the next year. Each applicant also must never have been married or have had a marriage annulled, have no children, and must agree not to marry prior to January 5 of the next year.

== Background ==
The Rose Court rides on a float in the Rose Parade, and become ambassadors of the Tournament of Roses, mainly during its duration and prelude. The Rose Court members attend over one hundred events in the Southern California area and preside over the Rose Bowl Game. Rose Court members receive scholarship money, wardrobe, and other benefits. The crown, provided and created by Mikimoto, is valued at $400,000. It is adorned with 600 cultured pearls and 6 carats (1,200 mg) of diamonds.

There was no queen crowned for 2021 because the Rose Parade was cancelled.

== Complete list ==
- 1905: Hallie Woods (McConnell)
- 1906: Elsie Armitage (Prizer)
- 1907: Joan (Hadenfeldt) Woodbury
- 1908: May Sutton (Bundy)
- 1909-1910: No Queens
- 1911: Ruth Palmer
- 1912: No Queen
- 1913: Jean P. French (Queen) & Drummond Harrison (King)
- 1914: Mabel Seibert (Loughery)
- 1915-1922: No Queens
- 1923: May McAvoy (Cleary)
- 1924: No Queen
- 1925: Margaret (Mann) Scoville
- 1926: Fay Lanphier
- 1927: No Queen
- 1928: Harriet Sterling
- 1929: No Queen
- 1930: Holly Halsted (Balthis)
- 1931: Mary Lou Waddell
- 1932: Mryta Olmsted (Poulson)
- 1933: Dorothy Edwards (Conlon)
- 1934: (Loretta) Treva Scott (Oxford)
- 1935: Muriel Cowan (Moore)
- 1936: Barbara Nichols (Field)
- 1937: Nancy Bumpus (Urquhart Buck)
- 1938: Cheryl Walker (Etzell Coumbe Andrews)
- 1939: Barbara Dougall
- 1940: Margaret Huntley (Main)
- 1941: Sally Stanton (Rubsamen)
- 1942: Dolores Brubach (Chase)
- 1943: Mildred Miller
- 1944: Naomi Riordan
- 1945: Mary Rutte (Wallace)
- 1946: Patricia Auman (Richards)
- 1947: Norma Christopher (Winton)
- 1948: Virginia Goodhue
- 1949: Virginia Bower (Nichols)
- 1950: Marion Brown
- 1951: Eleanor Payne
- 1952: Nancy Thorne
- 1953: Leah Feland (Cullen)
- 1954: Barbara Schmidt (Mulligan)
- 1955: Marilyn Smuin (Martell)
- 1956: Joan Culver (Warren)
- 1957: Ann Mossberg (Hall)
- 1958: Gertrude Wood
- 1959: Pamela Prather
- 1960: Margarethe Bertelson (Knoblock)
- 1961: Carole Washburn
- 1962: Martha Sissell
- 1963: Nancy Davis (Maggio)
- 1964: Nancy Kneeland (Kish)
- 1965: Dawn Baker
- 1966: Carole Cota (Gelfuso)
- 1967: Barbara Hewitt (Laughray)
- 1968: Linda Strother
- 1969: Pamela Anicich
- 1970: Pamela Dee Tedesco
- 1971: Kathleen Arnett (Miller)
- 1972: Margolyn Johnson
- 1973: Salli Noren
- 1974: Miranda Barone
- 1975: Robin Carr
- 1976: Anne Martin
- 1977: Diane Ramaker (Stimson)
- 1978: Maria Caron
- 1979: Catherine Gilmour
- 1980: Julie Raatz
- 1981: Leslie Kawai
- 1982: Katherine Potthast
- 1983: Suzanne Gillaspie
- 1984: Ann Marie Colborn
- 1985: Kristina Smith
- 1986: Aimee Richelieu
- 1987: Kristin Harris
- 1988: Julie Myers (King)
- 1989: Charmaine Shryock (Bailey)
- 1990: Yasmine Delawari
- 1991: Cara Rullman
- 1992: Tannis Turrentine
- 1993: Liana Carisa Yamasaki (Joyner)
- 1994: Erica Brynes
- 1995: Aliya Haque
- 1996: Keli Hutchins
- 1997: Jennifer Halferty
- 1998: Purdy Tran
- 1999: Christina Farrell
- 2000: Sophia Bush
- 2001: Michelle Jacobs
- 2002: Caroline Hsu
- 2003: Alexandra Wucetich
- 2004: Megan Chinen
- 2005: Ashley Moreno
- 2006: Camille Clark
- 2007: Mary McCluggage
- 2008: Dusty Gibbs
- 2009: Courtney Chou Lee
- 2010: Natalie Innocenzi
- 2011: Evanne Friedmann
- 2012: Drew Helen Washington
- 2013: Vanessa Manjarrez
- 2014: Ana Marie Acosta
- 2015: Madison Elaine Triplett
- 2016: Erika Karen Winter
- 2017: Victoria Cecilia Castellanos
- 2018: Isabella Marie Marez
- 2019: Louise Siskel
- 2020: Camille Kennedy
- 2021: No Queen (cancelled by COVID-19 pandemic)
- 2022: Nadia Chung
- 2023: Bella Ballard
- 2024: Naomi Stillitano
- 2025: Lindsay Charles
- 2026: Serena Hui Guo
- 2027: Irene Lim Maddox

== Gallery ==
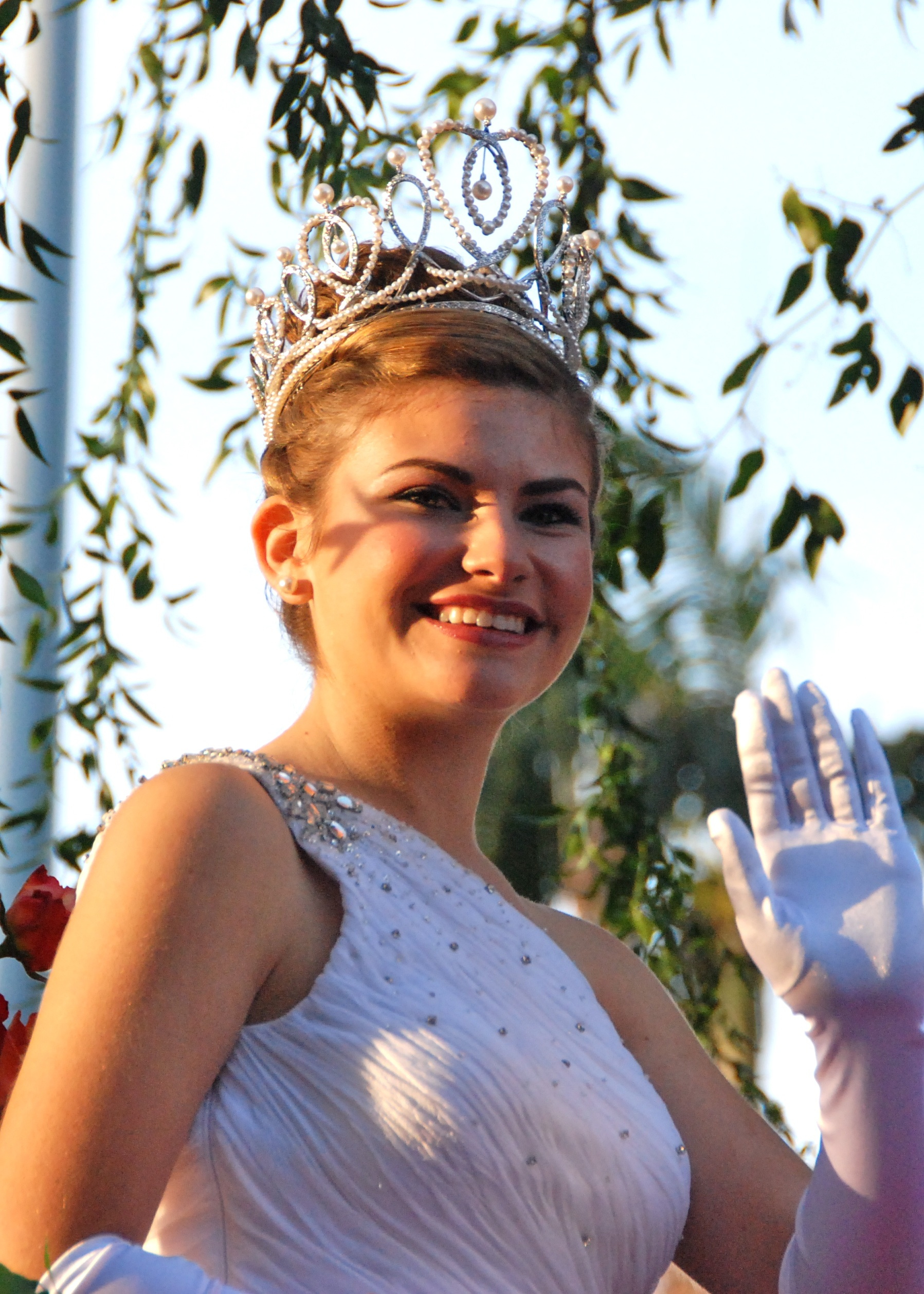
2010 Queen, Natalie Innocenzi, on January 1, 2010

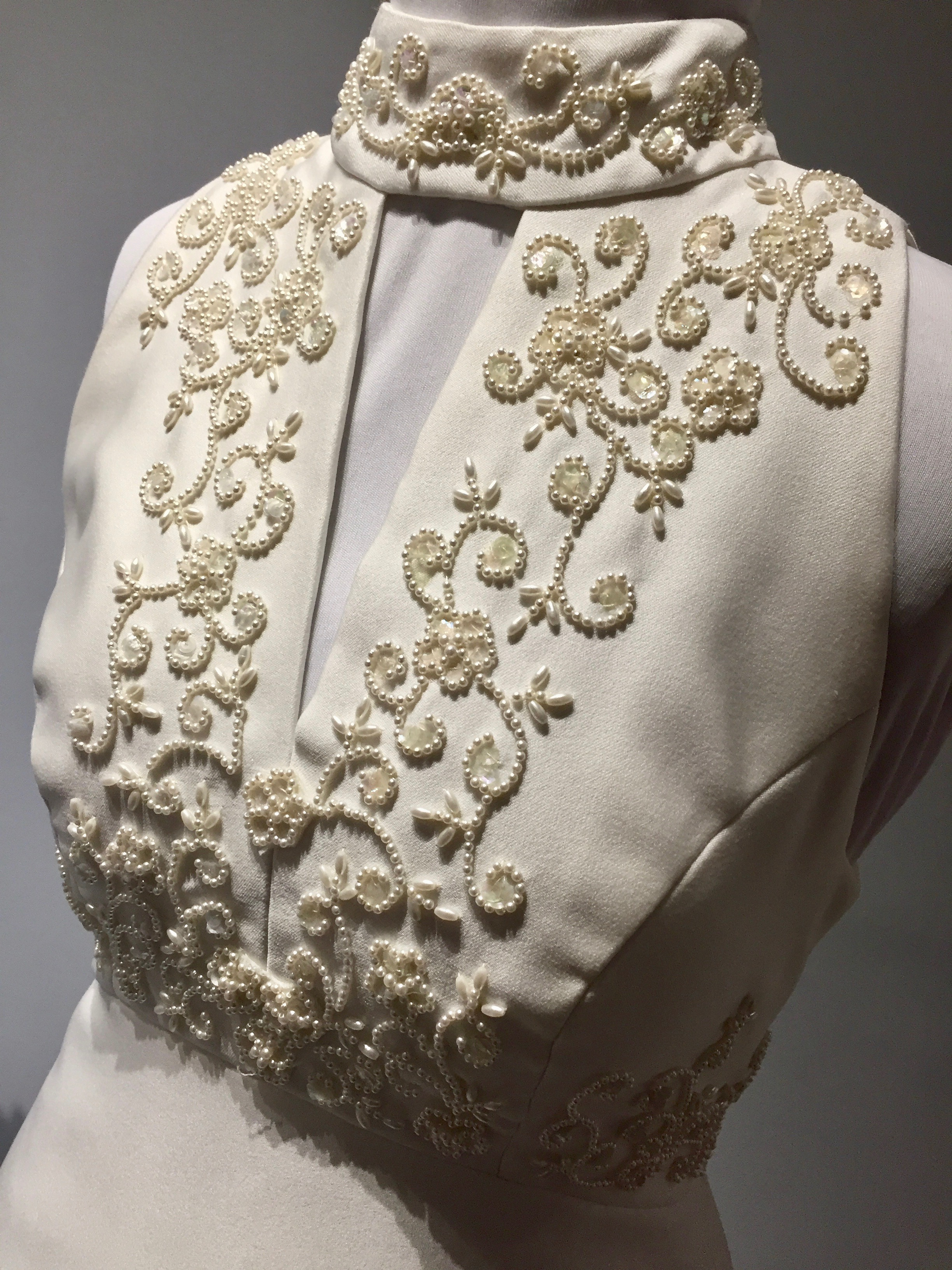
1977 Rose Queen gown

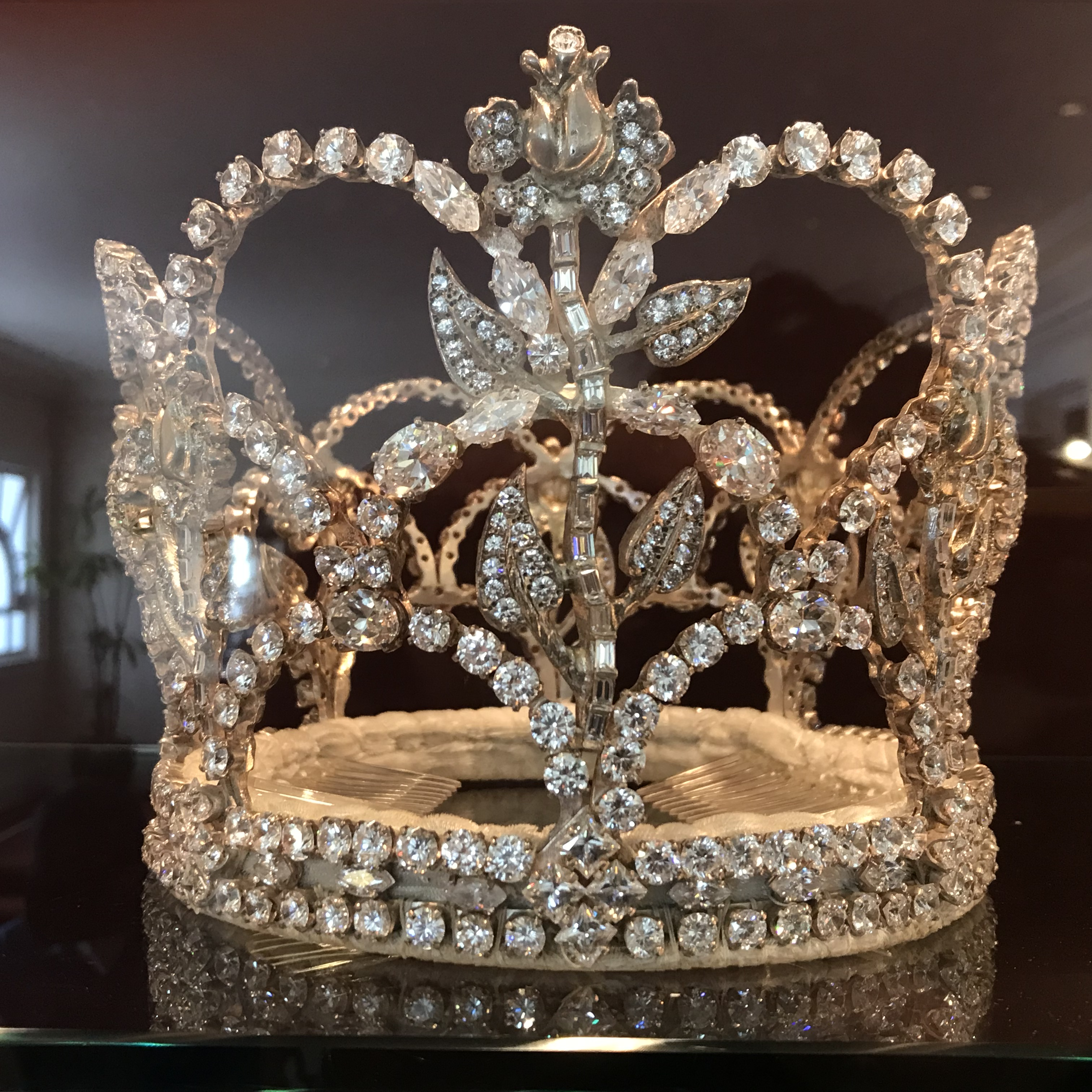
Rose Queen crown on display at the Tournament of Roses House

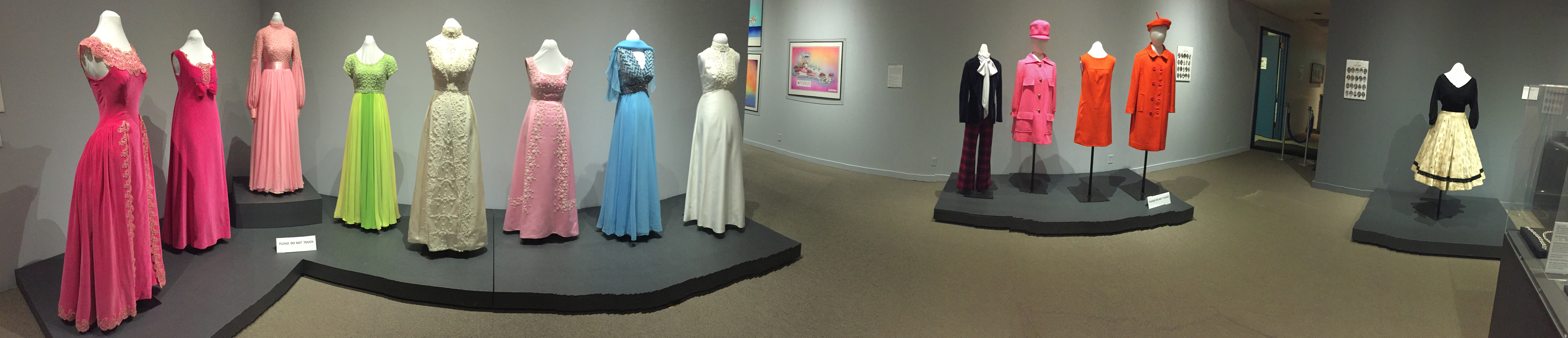
Rose Queen and Rose Court gowns and outfits as seen at Pasadena Museum of History's Royals of Pasadena exhibit, Dec. 2017

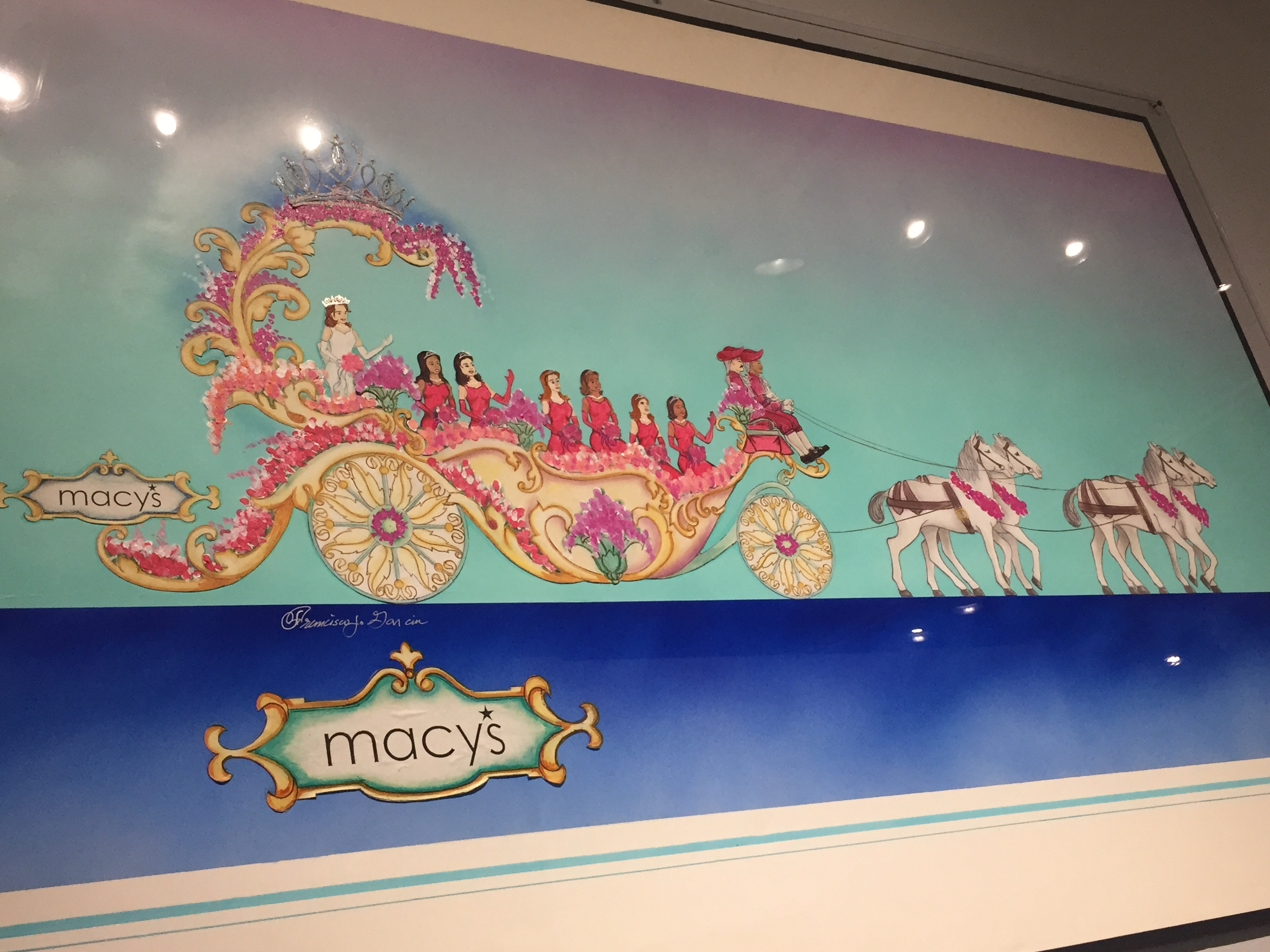
2006 Rose Queen float design by Francis W.J. Garcia

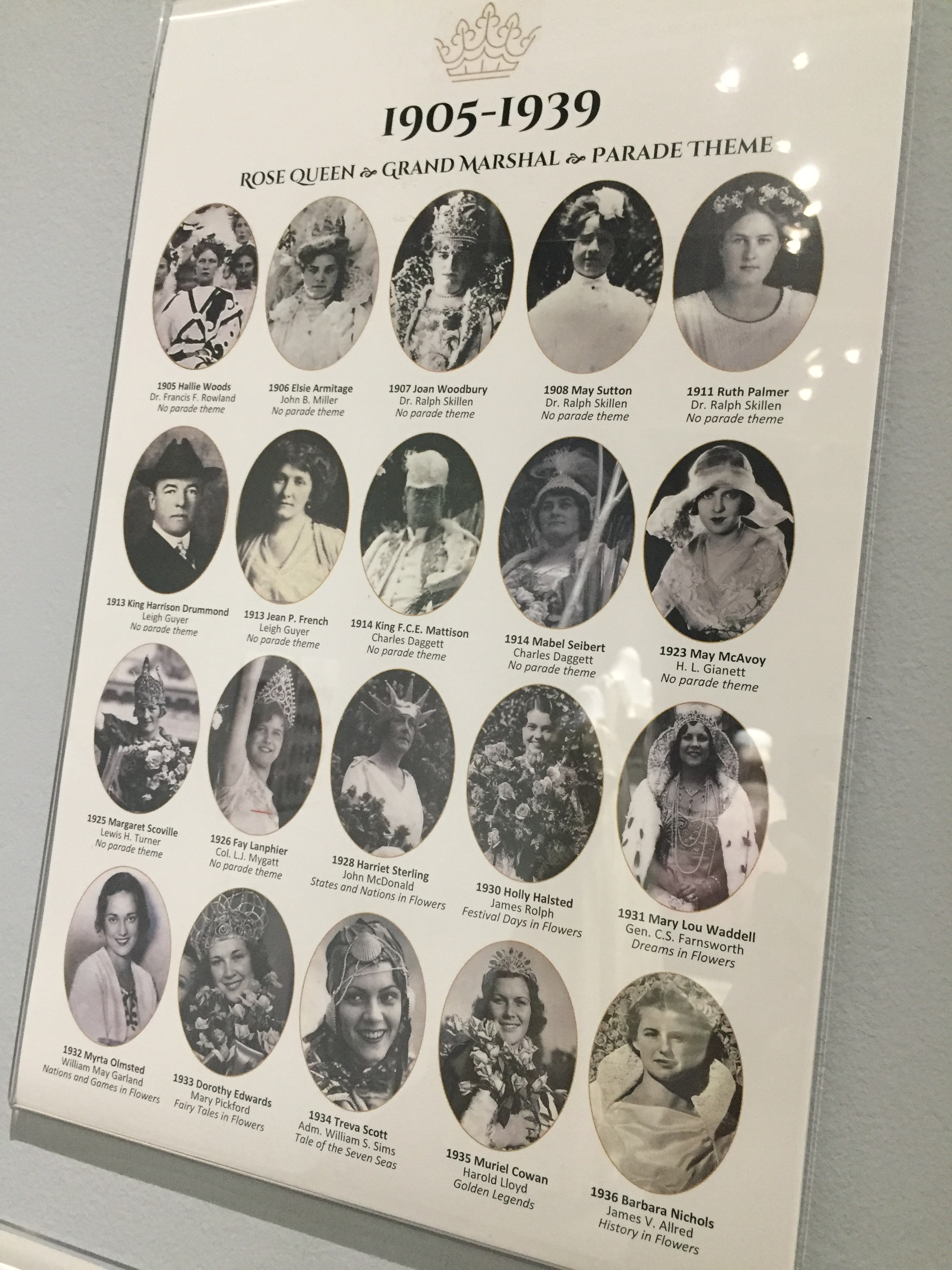
Rose Queens 1905–1939

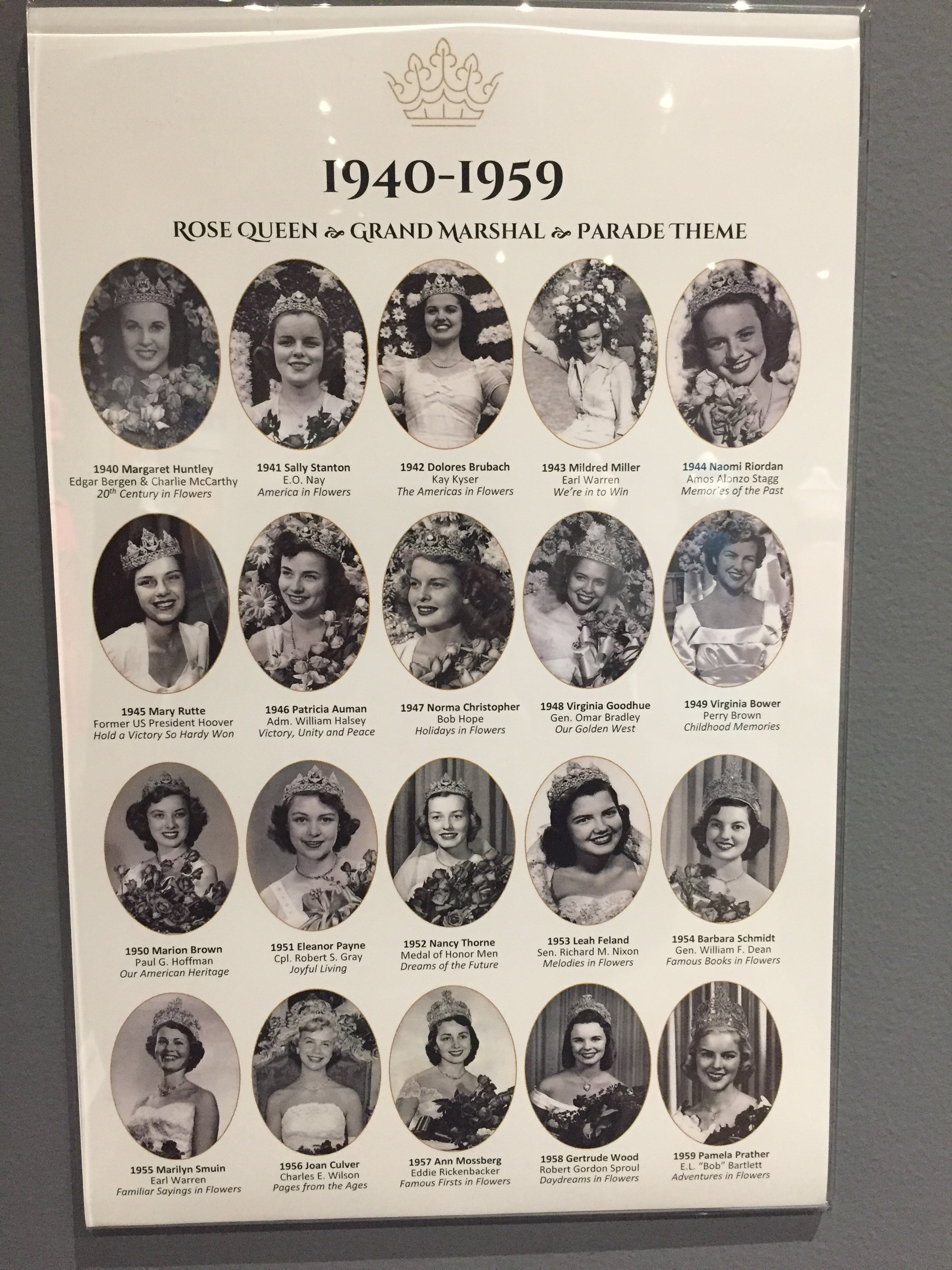
Rose Queens 1940–1959

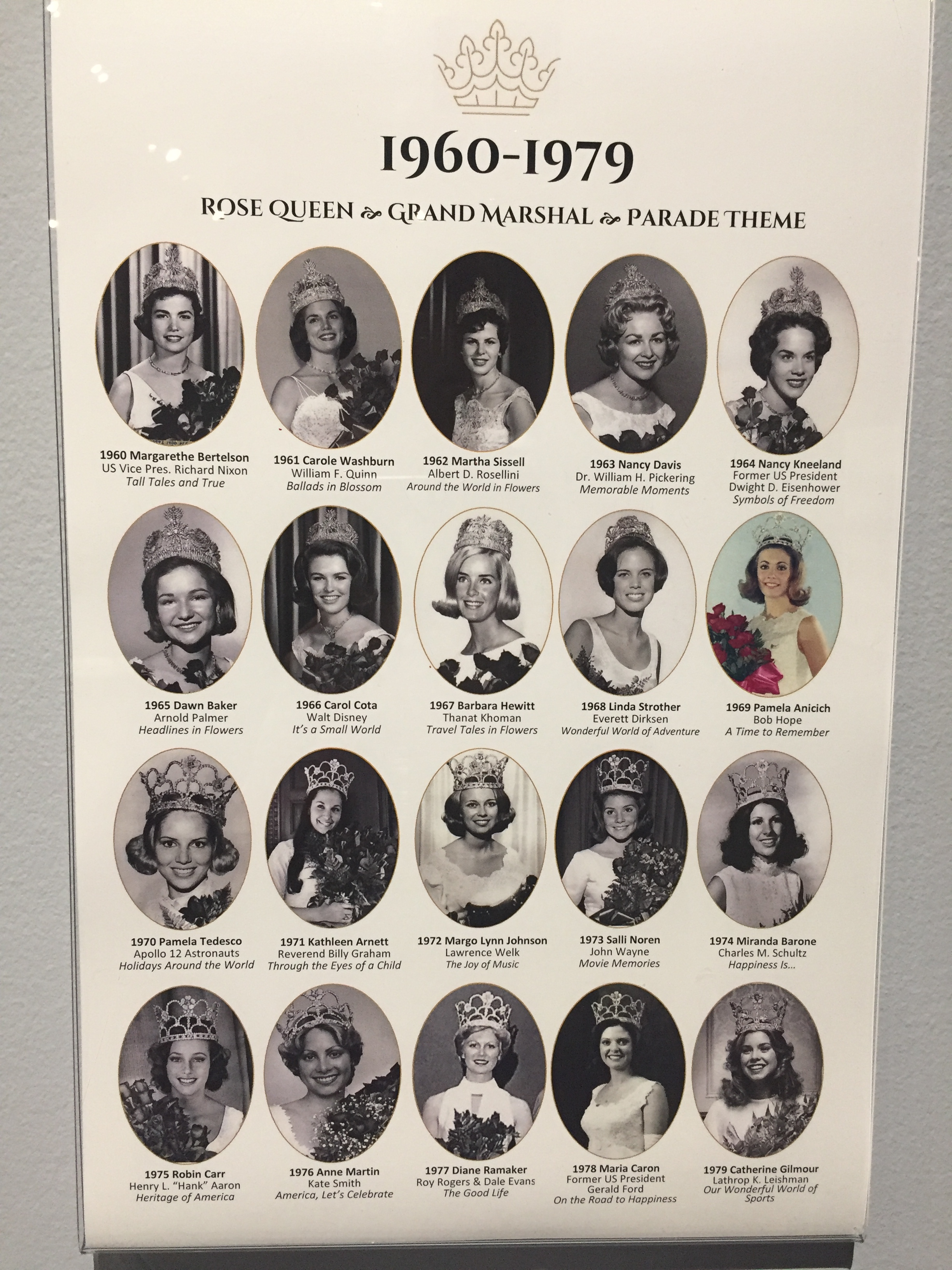
Rose Queens 1960–1979
