= Cal Poly Universities Rose Float =

Float in the Pasasdena Rose Parade

Cal Poly Universities Rose Float Logo

The Cal Poly Universities Rose Float is a joint entry of a rose float into the Pasadena Tournament of Roses Association's annual Rose Parade by both Cal Poly San Luis Obispo and Cal Poly Pomona universities. These two institutions have continuously participated in the parade since 1949; winning the Award of Merit in their first year. The Cal Poly floats have led in introducing technology to the Parade, including the first use of hydraulics for animation in 1968, the first use of computer-controlled animation in 1978, the first use of fiber optics in 1982, animated deco in 2014, and the first to create a color changing floral effect in 2017. As of January 1, 2024, the floats have won 63 awards. This program is one of the longest consecutive running self-built entries in the parade, as well as the only "self built" float designed and constructed entirely by students year-round on two campuses. They compete against professional float builders who manufacture entries for sponsors, many of them with development budgets approaching $1 million. This tradition continues today and marks the partnership between the two campuses.

Road & Track magazine did a road test of the Cal Poly Universities Rose Float as part of their annual April issue of unusual vehicles.

For the 2022 float, a football tribute was added in memory of John Madden, who received degrees from Cal Poly San Luis Obispo. The football read "Madden, Ride High", referring to the school's fight song "Ride High You Mustangs".

Cal Poly Universities' 2026 float Jungle Jumpstart became the first self-built float to win the Sweepstakes Trophy

== History ==
=== List of Cal Poly Rose Floats ===
Entry #	Year	Title	Photo	Rendering	Hi-res Video	Float Of The Week	Award
77	2026	Jungle Jumpstart	Cal Poly Float 2026	Cal Poly Rendering 2026	2026 Hi-Res	-	Sweepstakes
76	2025	Nessie's Lakeside Laughs	Cal Poly Float 2025	Cal Poly Rendering 2025	2025 Hi-Res	-	Leishman Public Spirit
75	2024	Shock n' Roll: Powering the Musical Current	Cal Poly Float 2024	Cal Poly Rendering 2024	2024 Hi-Res	—	Crown City Innovator
74	2023	Road to Reclamation	Cal Poly Float 2023	Cal Poly Rendering 2023	2023 Hi-Res	2023 FOTW	Extraordinaire
73	2022	Stargrazers	Cal Poly Float 2022	Cal Poly Rendering 2022	2022 Hi-Res	2022 FOTW	Animation
72	2020	Aquatic Aspirations	Cal Poly Float 2020	Cal Poly Rendering 2020	2020 Hi-Res	2020 FOTW	Director
71	2019	Far Out Frequencies	Cal Poly Float 2019	Cal Poly Rendering 2019	2019 Hi-Res	2019 FOTW	Extraordinaire
70	2018	Dreams Take Flight	Cal Poly Float 2018	Cal Poly Rendering 2018	2018 Hi-Res	2018 FOTW	Past President
69	2017	A New Leaf	Cal Poly Float 2017	Cal Poly Rendering 2017	2017 Hi-Res	—	Founders' Trophy
68	2016	Sweet Shenanigans	Cal Poly Float 2016	Cal Poly Rendering 2016	2016 Hi-Res	2016 FOTW	Lathrop K. Leishman Trophy
67	2015	Soaring Stories	Cal Poly Float 2015	Cal Poly Rendering 2015	2015 Hi-Res	2015 FOTW	Lathrop K. Leishman Trophy
66	2014	Bedtime Buccaneers	Cal Poly Float 2014	Cal Poly Rendering 2014	2014 Hi-Res	2014 FOTW	Crown City Innovation Trophy
65	2013	Tuxedo Air	Cal Poly Float 2013	Cal Poly Rendering 2013	2013 Hi-Res	2013 FOTW	Bob Hope Humor Trophy
64	2012	To the Rescue!	Cal Poly Float 2012	Cal Poly Rendering 2012	2012 Hi-Res	—	KTLA Favorite Float Award
63	2011	Galactic Expedition	Cal Poly Float 2011	Cal Poly Rendering 2011	2011 Hi-Res	—	Fantasy Trophy / Viewers' Choice Award
62	2010	Jungle Cuts	Cal Poly Float 2010	Cal Poly Rendering 2010	2010 Hi-Res	—	Bob Hope Humor Trophy / Viewers' Choice Award
61	2009	Seaside Amusement	Cal Poly Float 2009	Cal Poly Rendering 2009	2009 Hi-Res	2009 FOTW	Viewers' Choice Award
60	2008	Guardians of Harmony	Cal Poly Float 2008	Cal Poly Rendering 2008	2008 Hi-Res	—	Fantasy Trophy
59	2007	Arctic Antics	Cal Poly Float 2007	Cal Poly Rendering 2007	2007 Hi-Res	—	No award won
58	2006	Enchanted Reverie	Cal Poly Float 2006	Cal Poly Rendering 2006	2006 Hi-Res	—	No award won
57	2005	Elefun Time	Cal Poly Float 2005	Cal Poly Rendering 2005	2005 Hi-Res	—	No award won
56	2004	Bob's Barnacle Band	Cal Poly Float 2004	Cal Poly Rendering 2004	2004 Hi-Res	2004 FOTW	Founders' Trophy
55	2003	A Sundae Afternoon	Cal Poly Float 2003	Cal Poly Rendering 2003	2003 Hi-Res	—	Theme Prize
54	2002	Birthday Blowout	Cal Poly Float 2002	Cal Poly Rendering 2002	2002 Hi-Res	—	No award won
53	2001	A Grizzly Situation	Cal Poly Float 2001	Cal Poly Rendering 2001	2001 Hi-Res	—	Founders' Trophy
52	2000	Stolen Time	Cal Poly Float 2000	Cal Poly Rendering 2000	2000 Hi-Res	—	Humor Trophy
51	1999	Surfing the Net	Cal Poly Float 1999	Cal Poly Rendering 1999	1999 Hi-Res	—	No award won
50	1998	Countryside Joyride	Cal Poly Float 1998	Cal Poly Rendering 1998	1998 Hi-Res	1998 FOTW	Founders' Trophy
49	1997	Catch of the Day	Cal Poly Float 1997	Cal Poly Rendering 1997	1997 Hi-res	—	Founders' Trophy
48	1996	Thumbs Up	Cal Poly Float 1996	Cal Poly Rendering 1996	1996 Hi-res	—	No award won
47	1995	Bending the Rules	Cal Poly Float 1995	Cal Poly Rendering 1995	1995 Hi-res	—	No award won
46	1994	A Novel Adventure	Cal Poly Float 1994	Cal Poly Rendering 1994	1994 Hi-res	—	No award won
45	1993	Hare Raising Fun	Cal Poly Float 1993	Cal Poly Rendering 1993	1993 Hi-res	1993 FOTW	No award won
44	1992	Squeaking By	Cal Poly Float 1992	Cal Poly Rendering 1992	1992 Hi-res	—	No award won
43	1991	Tickle Attack	Cal Poly Float 1991	Cal Poly Rendering 1991	1991 Hi-res	—	Humor Trophy
42	1990	Sound Waves	Cal Poly Float 1990	Cal Poly Rendering 1990	1990 Hi-res	—	No award won
41	1989	Paradin' Around	Cal Poly Float 1989	Cal Poly Rendering 1989	1989 Hi-Res	1989 FOTW	Founders' Trophy
40	1988	Imagine That...	Cal Poly Float 1988	Cal Poly Rendering 1988	1988 Hi-Res	-	Founders' Trophy
39	1987	Breaking the Ice	Cal Poly Float 1987	Cal Poly Rendering 1987	1987 Hi-res	1987 FOTW	No award won
38	1986	Bubble Trouble	Cal Poly Float 1986	Cal Poly Rendering 1986	1986 Hi-res	—	Founders' Trophy
37	1985	Only in America	Cal Poly Float 1985	Cal Poly Rendering 1985	1985 Hi-res	1985 FOTW	No award won
36	1984	A Knight to Remember	Cal Poly Float 1984	Cal Poly Rendering 1984	1984 Hi-res	—	No award won
35	1983	While the Cat's at Play	Cal Poly Float 1983	Cal Poly Rendering 1983	1983 Hi-res	1983 FOTW	Princess Award
34	1982	Way Out Welcome	Cal Poly Float 1982	Cal Poly Rendering 1982	1982 Hi-res	—	Princess Award
33	1981	Snow Poke	Cal Poly Float 1981	Cal Poly Rendering 1981	1981 Hi-res	1981 FOTW	1st Class H
32	1980	Hard Rock	Cal Poly Float 1980	Cal Poly Rendering 1980	1980 Hi-res	—	Founders' Trophy
31	1979	Cub O' War	Cal Poly Float 1979	Cal Poly Rendering 1979	1979 Hi-res	—	Princess Award
30	1978	Grin And Bear It	Cal Poly Float 1978	Cal Poly Rendering 1978	1978 Hi-res	—	1st Class H
29	1977	Tons Of Fun	Cal Poly Float 1977	Cal Poly Rendering 1977	1977 Hi-res	—	Princess Award
28	1976	High Hopes	Cal Poly Float 1976	Cal Poly Rendering 1976	1976 Hi-res	1976 FOTW	Founders' Trophy
27	1975	Building A Better Mousetrap	Cal Poly Float 1975	Cal Poly Rendering 1975	1975 Hi-res	1975 FOTW	Princess Award
26	1974	Happiness Is Finding A Friend	Cal Poly Float 1974	Cal Poly Rendering 1974	1974 Hi-res	—	Theme Prize
25	1973	Monster Matinee	Cal Poly Float 1973	Cal Poly Rendering 1973	1973 Hi-res	—	1st Class H
24	1972	Swamp Rhythm	Cal Poly Float 1972	Cal Poly Rendering 1972	1972 Hi-res	—	Mayor's Trophy
23	1971	Once Upon A Dream	Cal Poly Float 1971	Cal Poly Rendering 1971	1971 Hi-res	—	Judges' Special
22	1970	That First Day Of Spring	Cal Poly Float 1970	Cal Poly Rendering 1970	1970 Hi-res	1970 FOTW	Princess Award
21	1969	The Good Ole Days	Cal Poly Float 1969	Cal Poly Rendering 1969	1969 Hi-res	—	Princess Award
20	1968	The Mouse That Got Away	Cal Poly Float 1968	Cal Poly Rendering 1968	1968 Hi-res	1968 FOTW	Princess Award
19	1967	A Child's Fantasy	Cal Poly Float 1967	Cal Poly Rendering 1967	1967 Hi-res	1967 FOTW	Mayor's Trophy
18	1966	It's A Child's World	Cal Poly Float 1966	Cal Poly Rendering 1966	1966 Hi-res	1966 FOTW	Judges' Special
17	1965	Good News Travels Fast	Cal Poly Float 1965	Cal Poly Rendering 1965	1965 Hi-res	1965 FOTW	1st Class H
16	1964	Cutting The Apron Strings	Cal Poly Float 1964	Cal Poly Rendering 1964	1964 Hi-res	1964 FOTW	1st Class H
15	1963	A Young Man's Fancy	Cal Poly Float 1963	Cal Poly Rendering 1963	1963 Hi-res	1963 FOTW	1st Class H
14	1962	Man On The Moon	Cal Poly Float 1962	Cal Poly Rendering 1962	1962 Hi-res	1962 FOTW	1st Class H
13	1961	Slow Boat To China	Cal Poly Float 1961	Cal Poly Rendering 1961	1961 Hi-res	1961 FOTW	1st Class H
12	1960	Special Delivery	Cal Poly Float 1960	Cal Poly Rendering 1960	1960 Hi-res	1960 FOTW	1st Class H
11	1959	Georgie's Dream (St. George And The Dragon)	Cal Poly Float 1959	Cal Poly Rendering 1959	1959 Hi-res	1959 FOTW	Theme Prize
10	1958	Summer Daze	Cal Poly Float 1958	Cal Poly Rendering 1958	1958 Hi-res	1958 FOTW	2nd Class H
9	1957	Which Was First - The Chicken or the Egg?	Cal Poly Float 1957	Cal Poly Rendering 1957	1957 Hi-res	1957 FOTW	Theme Prize
8	1956	Steps To Peace	Cal Poly Float 1956	Cal Poly Rendering 1956	1956 Hi-res	1956 FOTW	1st Class H
7	1955	The Sky's The Limit	Cal Poly Float 1955	Cal Poly Rendering 1955	1955 Hi-res	1955 FOTW	2nd Class H
6	1954	Gulliver's Travels	Cal Poly Float 1954	Cal Poly Rendering 1954	1954 Hi-res	1954 FOTW	1st Class H
5	1953	Mission Bells	Cal Poly Float 1953	—	1953 Hi-res	1953 FOTW	3rd Class H
4	1952	A Free World Thru Education	Cal Poly Float 1952	Cal Poly Rendering 1952	1952 Hi-res	1952 FOTW	1st Class H
3	1951	College Barn Dance	Cal Poly Float 1951	Cal Poly Rendering 1951	1951 Hi-res	1951 FOTW	1st Class H
2	1950	New Frontiers	Cal Poly Float 1950	—	1950 Hi-res	1950 FOTW	3rd Class H
1	1949	Rocking Horse	Cal Poly Float 1949	—	1949 Hi-res	1949 FOTW	Award of Merit

== Awards ==
Since 1949 the floats have won 63 trophies (over 81.8% winning rate).

Trophy	Trophy Description	Wins	Winning Years
Animation	Best Display of Animation (1984 to present)	1	2022
Award of Merit	Depicting the highest level of Merit	1	1949
Bob Hope Humor Trophy & Humor Trophy	Most comical and amusing, Best display of Humor	4	1991, 2000, 2010, 2013
Crown City Innovation Trophy	Best Use of Imagination & Innovation to Advance the Art of Float Design	2	2014, 2024
Director Trophy	Most outstanding artistic design and use of floral and non-floral materials	1	2020
Extraordinaire Award	Most Extraordinary Float on the Parade, Including Those Longer than 55' Long.	2	2019, 2023
Fantasy Trophy	Most Outstanding Display of Fantasy & Imagination	2	2008, 2011
Founder's Trophy	Most outstanding self-decorated entry.	10	1976, 1980, 1986, 1988, 1989, 1997, 1998, 2001, 2004, 2017
Judges' Special	Most Spectacular in Showmanship & Dramatic Impact	2	1966, 1971
Lathrop K. Leishman / Leishman Public Spirit	Most outstanding floral presentation from a non-commercial participant	3	2015, 2016, 2025
Mayor's Trophy	Best display of Originality	2	1967, 1972
Past President	Most outstanding innovation in use of floral and non-floral materials	1	2018
Princess Award	Best Display of Animation (until 1984)	8	1968, 1969, 1970, 1975, 1977, 1979, 1982, 1983
Sweepstakes Award	Most beautiful entry, encompassing float design, floral presentation and entertainment	1	2026
Theme Prize	Most fitting presentation of theme	4	1957, 1959, 1974, 2003
Viewers' Choice Trophy & KTLA Favorite Float Award	Viewers favorite Rose Parade float poll (KTLA)	4	2009, 2010, 2011, 2012
1st Class H	1st Place - Educational division	13	1951, 1952, 1954, 1956, 1960, 1961, 1962, 1963, 1964, 1965, 1973, 1978, 1981
2nd Class H	2nd Place - Educational division	2	1955, 1958
3rd Class H	3rd Place - Educational division	2	1950, 1953
4th Class H	4th Place - Educational division	0	

== See also ==
- Tournament of Roses Parade themes
- Tournament of Roses floats
