= Rose Parade floats =

Flower-covered parade floats used in the Rose Parade

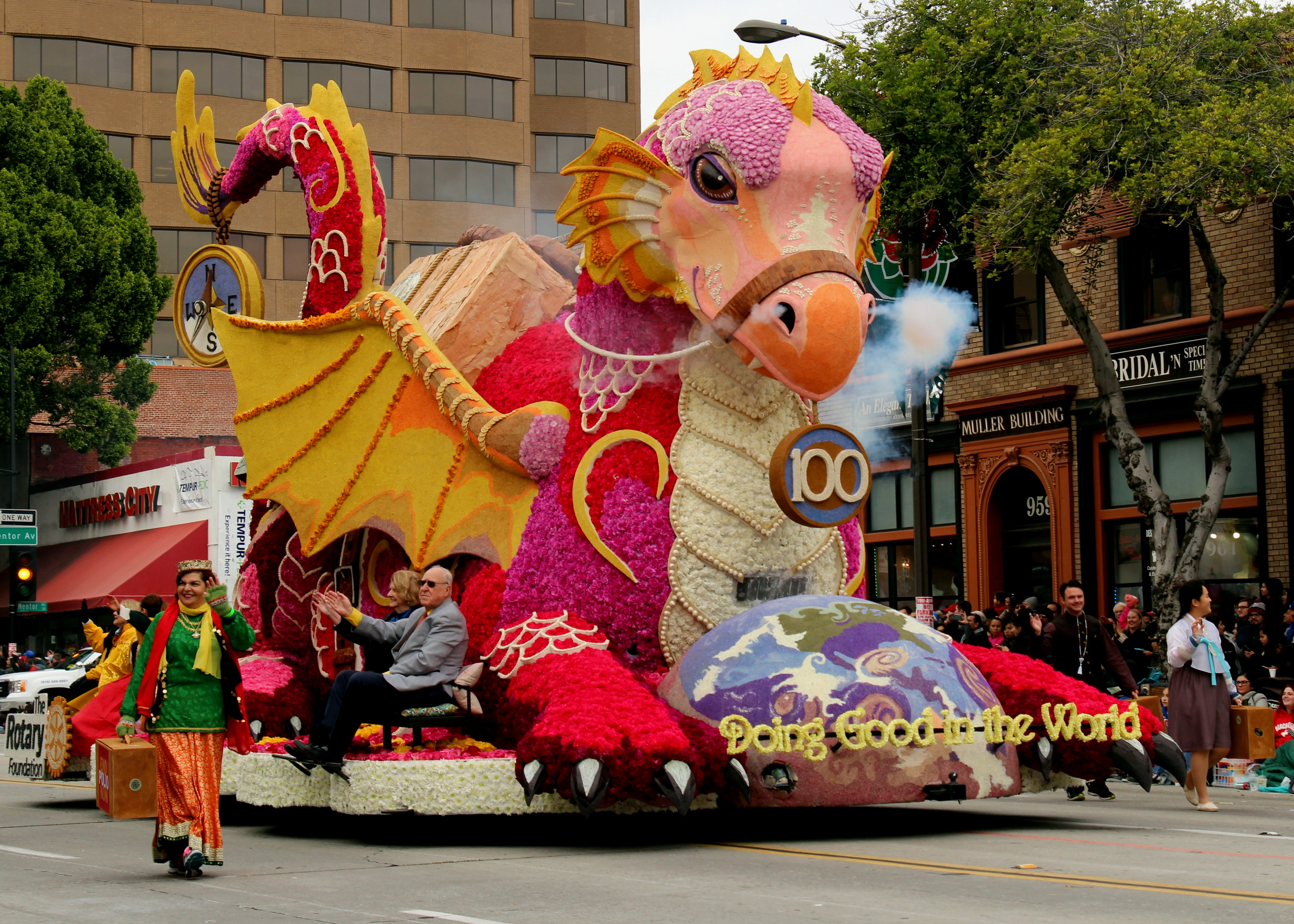
2017 centennial float for The Rotary Foundation, displaying several techniques and materials.

Tournament of Roses Parade floats are parade floats used in the annual New Year's Day Tournament of Roses Parade held in Pasadena, California. They evolved from flower-decorated horse carriages with the present day requirement that "every inch of every float must be covered with flowers or other natural materials, such as leaves, seeds or bark". Three civic and floral industry leaders judge the floats and award prizes in 24 categories.

While most are now built by professional float building companies, some communities and organizational sponsors, such as the City of Burbank, the City of Downey, City of South Pasadena, the City of Sierra Madre, the City of La Cañada Flintridge and the Cal Poly Universities, are referred to as "self-built floats" as they design, construct and decorate their floats solely on volunteer hours.

== History ==
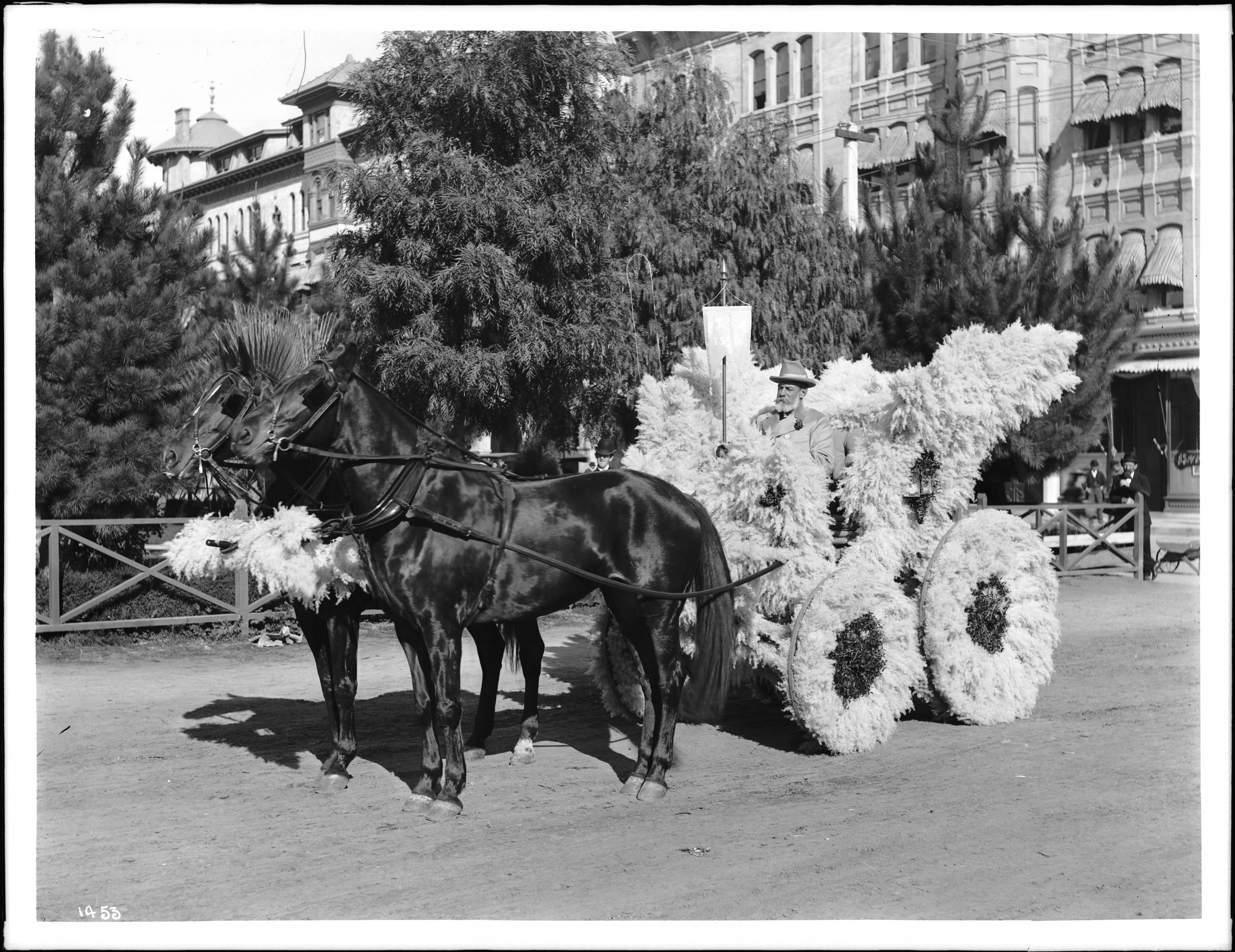
ca. 1903 horse-drawn float

The Rose Parade in Pasadena, California happens every year on New Year's Day. The first parade known as the “Battle of Flowers” was initiated by naturalist and teacher of zoology, Charles Frederick Holder, who was the first to introduce the idea of the Tournament of Roses to the Valley Hunt Club. The Valley Hunt Club was made up of wealthy Pasadena residents who migrated from the Eastern and Midwestern states. After moving to California, they became fascinated with the flowers that bloomed during winter. While the elite community began the Rose Parade as a celebration for the winter flowers, some involved in the real estate business used the parade as a way to attract land buyers in Pasadena.

Initially, the Rose Parade had challenges with the number of people who attended the event. Since many residents attended church services, in 1893, members of the club came up with a solution, known as "Never on a Sunday" that continues today. Two years later, the Tournament of Roses Parade became one of the biggest events in the city and The Valley Hunt Club was not able to handle the event on their own. Members of the community created the Tournament of Roses Association to take over the annual parade.

Almost ten years since the first Rose Parade, the tournament became a larger festival that gained popularity in many other cities, and eventually cross-country. New technologies were available and made communication and travel easier. In 1898, the first newspaper coverage of the Rose Parade traveled to the East Coast. After the first production of automobiles, the Tournament of Roses Association allowed motor vehicles to be used as floats, as long as they were in the back of parade where they would not disturb and scare the horses. As technology evolved, the tournament increased in popularity. In 1939, the Tournament of Roses Parade was aired locally on television station W6XAO Los Angeles. In 1951, the parade was shown nationwide on US television.

Just like technology, the community also began to evolve. In 1916, the association allowed for Edith Wright, the first woman to pilot a float. For almost a century, members of the Tournament of Roses Association were white males. In 1923, tournament officials decided to invite minorities and women into the committee. Although given full voting rights, new members of the association could not serve the same number of years, serving two years instead of nine. Members in City Hall wanted to be an example of change within communities. They envisioned a more diverse and inclusive community. Advocates, volunteers and community leaders supported the decision.

The association carefully chooses participants who will represent their local community. Many floral structures that are accepted each year from corporations, and voluntary associations. During the early parades, floats were carried by horses and carriages that transported local dignitaries and resident elites.

Fiesta Parade Floats was the oldest and smallest production company for the Rose Parade, which was known for using abundant flowers in their designs. It shut down in July 2024 due to financial issues. However, in December, Tournament officials confirmed Fiesta Productions, a new entity led by long-time Fiesta designer Mike Abboud, was to become an official builder for the 2026 Parade. Many of Fiesta's team members have been a part of the float-building industry since the 1970s.

== Modern-day process ==
Over time, contestants began to incorporate unique and original designs. Today, floats are more elaborate and bigger in size. Although participants continue the tradition of decorating floats exclusively with flowers, the use of new technology such as computerized animation, and robots has also been incorporated into design. Some materials also allowed in floats include, steel, plastic, wire mesh and plasticized spray coverings. One of the primary and most enforced rule of the float is that structure must be completely covered in flowers, petals and other vegetable materials such as “seeds, leaves and stems” Some flowers used in floats include roses, orchids, chrysanthemums and different types of blossoms.

Float design and construction is a multi-million, year-long process that begins once the parade is over. It provides jobs to many people and demands for big amounts of flowers each year. Much of the labor however is done by students, volunteers, and members of organizations. An average of 80,000 hours of labor is put into the process of floats with about 900 volunteers each year. In 2013, the Tournament of Roses Association reported the roses events had an economic impact of approximately $300 million.

There are three different types of entries in the Rose Parade; floats, marching bands and equestrian units. There are two divisions of floats: large commercial, which include big companies such as American Honda Motor Company, and Kaiser Permanente; non-commercial entries include smaller companies or organizations such as Cal Poly Universities and participating cities. Large commercial floats attract more attention due to the amount of time and money invested. Small, non-commercial floats are usually self-built and often obtain money through donations and voluntary labor. Together, there are approximately 50 floats participating annually.

Since the early parades in history, the 5.5-mile-long annual festival has had a major impact within the community. Themes are chosen carefully, and avoid controversial topics such as politics, religion, sex. Most theme names are broad and simple for people to understand the theme without an explanation. Themes can be interpreted in many ways and designers can get creative and express meaningful, important messages within their floats. The collaboration between the volunteers provides a community bonding that is rewarding to the people involved in the design, construction and decoration process of the floats.

After the parade, floats are stripped to their chassis. Structural steel elements are reused where possible; organic materials and sculptural steel are recycled.

Shortly after each year's parade is over, and the next year's parade theme is announced, the parade sponsors and participating communities start to plan their floats for the following year. A "theme draft" meeting is held in mid-February where builders select their float theme. The Tournament assures that there are not too many similar floats.

Characters and other objects on the float are created as separate elements to add later, consisting of a framework of steel and chicken wire. The chassis has beams and steel rod welded to it to support a mesh cover. The float is then "cocooned" in the next process; it is sprayed with a polyvinyl material which acts as a base for inserting decoration. This base is painted with the colors of the flowers to be applied to the float.

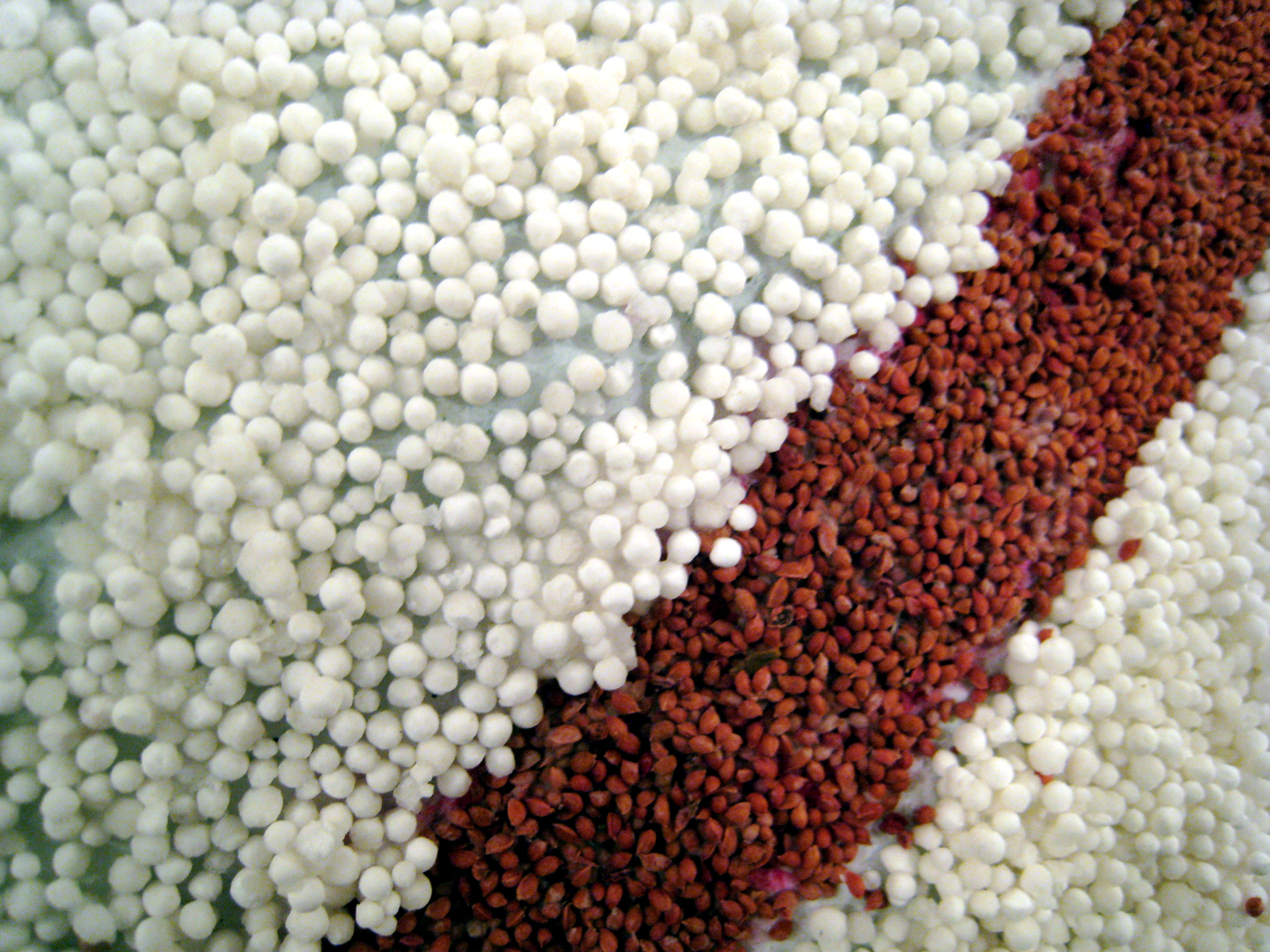
Tapioca pearls and cranberry seeds as decorations

Every square inch of the exposed surface of a float entered in the parade must be covered with flowers or other natural materials. These other decorative applicants include bark, seed and leaves. Decorating with the non-perishable materials is performed first. In the days following Christmas, the live additions to the float are applied by volunteers or hired workers. Delicate flowers are placed in individual vials of water and set into the float one-by-one. The Tournament of Roses is the largest consumer of flowers in the world, and flowers arrive from all over the world.

Many floats, along with their drive train, include computer-controlled robotic mechanisms to animate the floats. Most float drivers can only see the ground below them. An observer communicates by intercom to the driver. Most observers are hidden within the float and have limited visibility. Each float has a Tournament Member (Float Liaison) assigned to it who shepherds the float from the float barn to the formation area and down the parade route. Most ride on motor scooters although some walk. The Float Liaisons communicate with the float's observer by hand signals. At the two corners other Tournament Members direct the floats in addition to the Float Liaisons.

It is estimated that it takes 60 volunteers working 10 hours a day for 10 days to decorate one float.

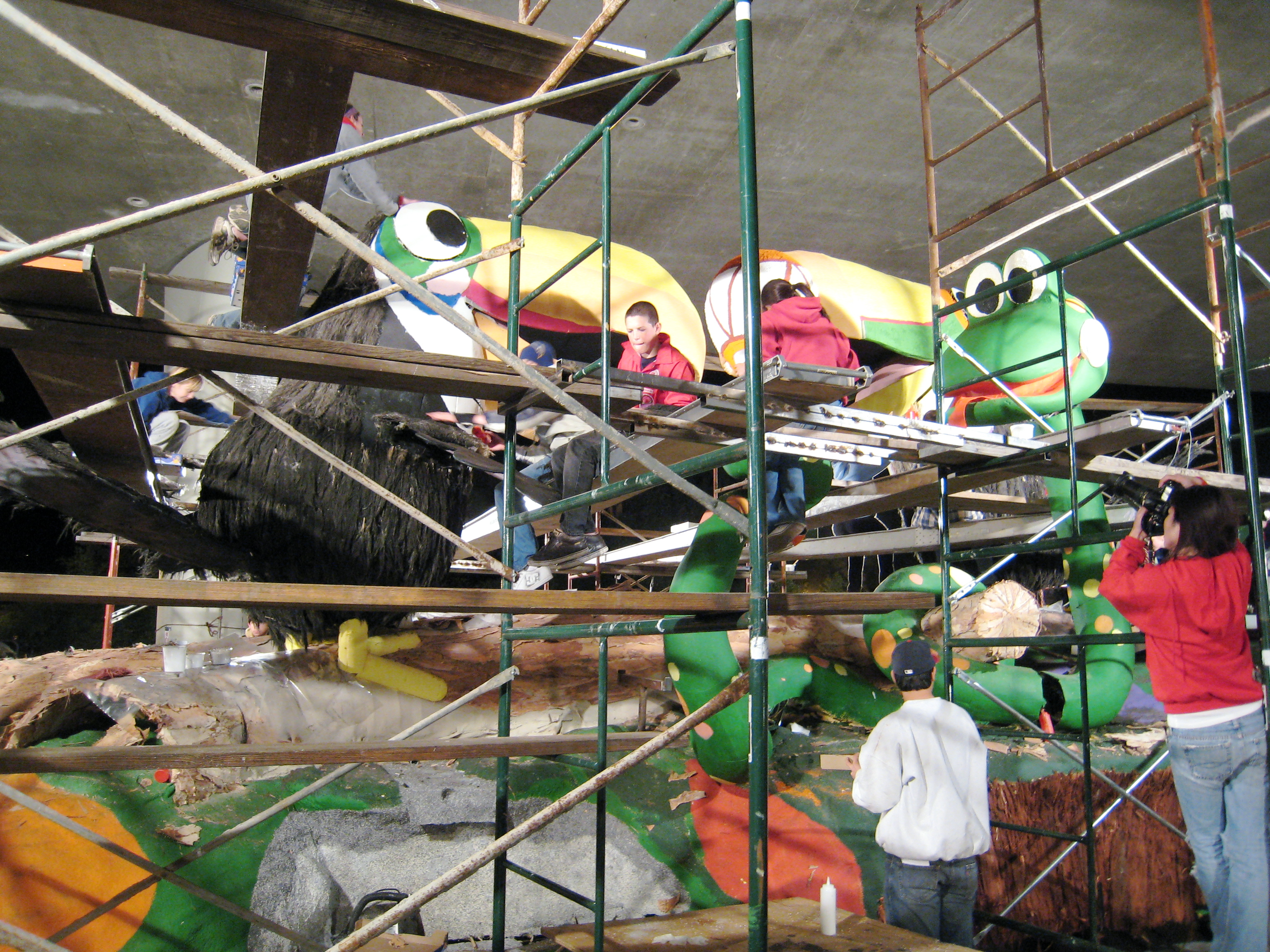
Float builders

- 20 daisies, 30 roses or 36 marigolds will cover one square foot of a float area
- Over 500,000 roses (in vials) used in the parade
- 15 tons of steel along with 10,000 feet (3,000 m) of chicken wire for the framework of a float
- 600 tons of steel, 5,000 gallons of glue and 18 million flowers are used to make the floats each year
- 935 “white-suiters” spent 80,000 hours to manpower and plan the parade
- Floats must collapse to no more than 16.5 ft (5.0 m). high, to pass under a freeway overpass
- Natural materials, such as bark, seeds, leaves and flowers, shall cover the floats
- Twenty-four awards for some 50 float entries
- Length of parade is 5.5 miles (8.9 km), about 2.25 hours long at 2.5 miles (4.0 km) per hour pace

== Viewing float decorating ==
After Christmas one can view many of the floats being decorated with flowery mantles, in the various "float barns" that dot the Pasadena area and communities to the east. The event is called "Decorating Places". This was not held in 2021 due to the pandemic.

Admission is charged for viewing the floats at the various sites. The flower float decorating places are the Rosemont Pavilion and the Rose Float Plaza North and South, in the City of Irwindale, California.

Approximately 120,000 visitors attended the three-day event in 2009.

== Quantity of flowers ==
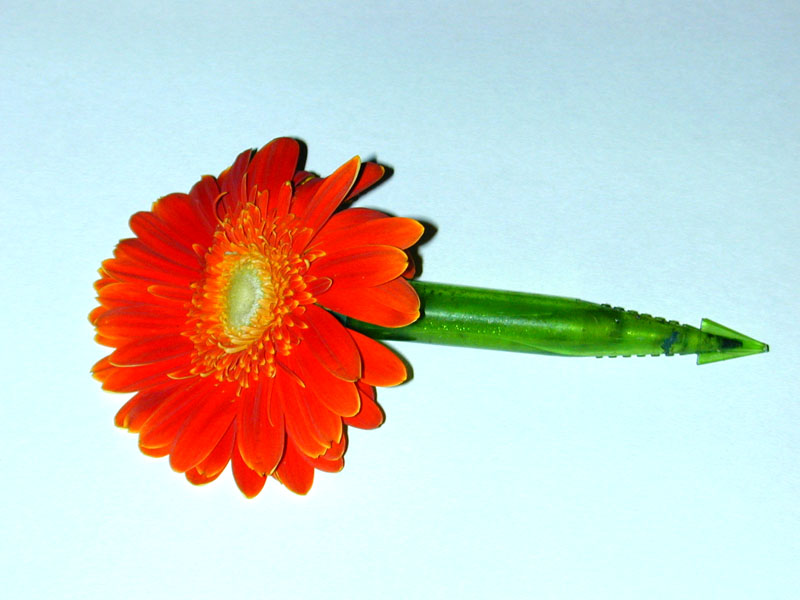
A flower used on a 2009 Rose Parade float

While many distinct changes have taken place with the Festival's floats, including computer-aided movement and professional float building, the floats have kept true to the event's title and heritage, by using real, fresh flowers. The cost of flowers is included in the total cost of the float and paid for by the float sponsor.

In the old days, some of the flowers used on the floats were home grown in the former Fanny Morrison Horticultural Center, now the Kidspace Children's Museum in the Arroyo Seco Natural Park.

== Floatfest: A Showcase of Floats ==
The Showcase is a paid admission area where the floats are displayed after the parade, for close-up viewing. The floats are parked along Sierra Madre and Washington Boulevards in Pasadena, near Pasadena High School and Victory Park, for three hours after the parade. On the day after the parade (occasionally two days when January 3 falls on Saturday or Sunday), the first two early morning hours (7–9) are reserved for seniors and the disabled, and the rest of day's worth of viewing for the general public. Due to the shortage of parking spaces in the area, a Park-N-Ride service is available at two Pasadena locations, at Pasadena City College and on January 2 and or January 3 only, at the Rose Bowl, when no Rose Bowl game is scheduled. The Los Angeles County Metropolitan Transportation Authority provides shuttle service from the Sierra Madre Villa A Line Station bus plaza with connections to the Metro A Line and Metro and Foothill Transit buses.

A fair-like environment with food and souvenir vending stands is created for public enjoyment. Handicap access and assistance is provided. Some of the animated floats are put on display with their animation running.

== Judging ==
Three civic and floral industry leaders evaluate the floats and hand out prizes to the participating floats in 24 categories. The top prize for the parade is the Sweepstakes Trophy for the most beautiful entry. Recent year judges:

- 2009: Richard Koshalek, recent president of Art Center College of Design; Sharon Loving, horticulture department head, Longwood Gardens of Kennett Square, Pennsylvania; and Beverly White, reporter and anchor, local NBC4 TV station.
- 2010: Christine Knoke, a curator at the Pasadena Norton Simon Museum; Ann Daly, DreamWorks Animation chief operating officer; and Jim Coiner, owner and founder of Coiner Nursery.

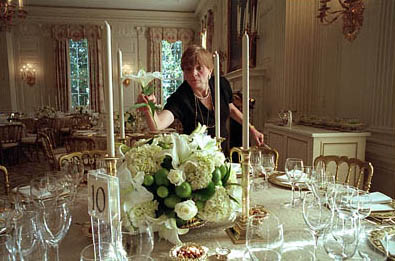
Designer Nancy Clarke at the White House

- 2011: Debbie Turner, actress (The Sound of Music) and floral designer; Nancy Clarke, former White House Chief Floral Designer, floral designer and author; Kirk Hendrix, President and CEO of the Indianapolis’ 500 Festival.
- 2012: Lois B. Fowkes, American Rose Society judge; Paula Pryke, British florist; Bryan Wittman, Vice President of Global Special Events for Disney Parks.
- 2013: Shane Connolly, British florist; Amy Kule, executive director of Macy's Thanksgiving Day Parade; Brian Sullivan, director of horticulture & garden operations at Descanso Gardens.
- 2014: Cheryl Cecchetto, founder/president of event planning company Sequoia Productions; James Folsom, botanical garden director at Huntington Library; and floral designer René van Rems.
- 2015: Els Hazenberg, Dutch floral designer; Steven Wood Schmader, president of International Festivals and Events Association; and Eddie Zaratsian, Los Angeles-based floral designer.
- 2016: Tom Bowling, Director of Education, Syndicate Sales; Timothy Lindsay, Virginia Robinson Gardens, Beverly Hills; and Jodie Petersen, landscape architect, the National Park Service (NPS).
- 2017: Phil Rulloda, floral designer; Ronnie Siegel, landscape architect with Swire Siegel; and Carol Togneri, chief curator, Norton Simon Museum.
- 2018: María Eugenia Carrion; Bradley Kaye, Disney Parks Live Entertainment; and Jim Suttonto, Longwood Gardens
- 2019: Preston Bailey, Michael E. Berry, and Kimberly Oldis
- 2020: Hitomi Gilliam AIFD, Phil Hettema and Lilit Khatchaturian
- 2022: Janet Gallagher AIFD, John Piper and J. Keith White AIFD
- 2023: Nicole Cavender, Huntington Library Director of the Botanical Gardens; Jennie O’Hagan, TV producer and Lois Hiranaga, floral design owner
- 2024: Heather de Kok, Judith K. Nakamura and Richard Schulhof
- 2025: Morgan Anderson, Bill Brzeski and Drew Rios
- 2026: Doris Hardoon, Cathy Hillen-Rulloda and Chaz Perea
- 2027: Karen Marshall, Ania Norwood, and Adam Schwerner

Judging occurs on the two days before the parade. In the first day's judging, the float is viewed "at rest", without any animation, sound, or riders. The float builder is allowed to explain the float to the judges before the judges begin their examination. In the second judging, the float is judged as it will be presented in the parade, with all animation, riders, outwalkers, and effects. Each judging session lasts five minutes.

Floats are judged in 14 categories, with varying weights; the most important categories are those relating to floral usage. Winners are announced at 6 AM on parade day.

== Sweepstakes Trophy ==
Recent Sweepstakes Trophy winners for the "Most beautiful entry: encompassing float design, floral presentation and entertainment":

Year	Sponsor	Float Title	Builder
2026	Cal Poly Universities	Jungle Jumpstart	Cal Poly Universities (Self Built)
2025	San Diego Zoo	Friendship Across the Earth	Artistic Entertainment Services
2024	San Diego Zoo	It Began With A Roar	Artistic Entertainment Services
2023	Donate Life America	Lifting Each Other Up	Fiesta Parade Floats
2022	UPS Store	Rise, Shine & Read	Fiesta Parade Floats
2021	–	No parade	–
2020	UPS Store	Stories Change Our World	Fiesta Parade Floats
2019	UPS Store	Books Keep Us On Our Toes	Fiesta Parade Floats
2018	Singpoli American BD	Rising Above	Paradiso Parade Floats
2017	Dole Packaged Foods	Spirit of Hawaii	Fiesta Parade Floats
2016	Singpoli Group	Marco Polo: East Meets West	Paradiso Parade Floats
2015	Dole Packaged Foods	Rhythm of Hawai'i	Fiesta Parade Floats
2014	Dole Packaged Foods	Sunrise at the Oasis	Fiesta Parade Floats
2013	Dole Food Company	Dreaming of Paradise	Fiesta Parade Floats
2012	Dole Food Company	Preserving Paradise	Fiesta Parade Floats
2011	Dole Food Company	Living Well in Paradise	Fiesta Parade Floats
2010	Rain Bird Corporation	Mountaintop Majesty	Fiesta Parade Floats
2009	Rain Bird Corporation	Entertaining Expedition	Fiesta Parade Floats
2008	Rain Bird Corporation	Preservation Celebration	Fiesta Parade Floats
2007	FTD	Jewels of Nature	Fiesta Parade Floats
2006	FTD	Your Wish is My Command	Fiesta Parade Floats
2005	Rain Bird Corporation	Playful Pandamonium	Fiesta Parade Floats
2004	FTD	Love Songs	Fiesta Parade Floats
2003	Rain Bird Corporation	Water Wonderland	Fiesta Parade Floats
2002	Rain Bird Corporation	Animal Ambassadors	Fiesta Parade Floats
2001	Rain Bird Corporation	Enchanted Expedition	Fiesta Parade Floats

== Notable recent floats ==
- In 2008, the Los Angeles Dodgers sponsored a float celebrating the 50th anniversary of the franchise in Los Angeles with a replica of the ballpark's hexagonal-shaped scoreboard.
- a Bollywood wedding scene featuring a bride riding in a palanquin carried by twelve men, a groom atop a giant animated elephant and an ensemble of Bollywood dancers (Sierra Madre, 2009).
- working roller coasters (2003 and 2009 Cal Poly Universities; 2000 and 2017, Downey)
- a 50-foot (15 m) replica of the Statue of Liberty (2006) by Honda advertising their slogan "The Power of Dreams". Honda's other recent floats have included a car transforming into a spaceship (2008) and ASIMO (2009).
- In 1985, the Hilton float carried the actual flame from the Statue of Liberty, while the statue was being renovated. It was one of the very few times in Tournament history when an object was allowed in the parade without full floral covering.
- BP (2008 or 2009) presented a group of dinosaurs with a 10-foot flame being ejected from a 20-foot erupting volcano.
- a working water slide (1993 La-Z-Boy "School's Out!"; 2012, Downey "Enchanted Paradise")
- a nearly 100-foot-tall (30 m) Twilight Zone Tower of Terror, 2004
- In 2008, Anaheim city's float that included the Stanley Cup that the NHL's Anaheim Ducks had won last season, hoisted by player Brad May. (As the regulations state that the outside of the float must exclusively use organic material, ABC commentators speculated that the city got an exception to display the Cup.) (2008)
- In 2010 Anaheim, California and the Los Angeles Angels of Anaheim commemorated a float to the 2010 All-Star Game at Angel Stadium
- The 2010 Dick Van Patten's Natural Balance float, featuring snowboarding bulldogs, measured over 113 feet (34 m) long, setting a Guinness world record for longest single chassis float.
- The 2011 theme float was decorated with the help from participants of the CBS television show Amazing Race, broadcast on Sunday, December 12, 2010. The final "roadblock" had one team member of the three finalists decorate one of three sections of the float with chrysanthemums and roses, and then covering a sculpted rose with natural material. During the parade, "Up with People" rode and performed atop of the float. For the second year in a row, the 2010 Dick Van Patten's Natural Balance float, featuring skim-boarding bulldogs was Certified by Guinness World Records as the "World's Heaviest Float," it featured over 4,000 gallons of water and was heavier than a 747 airplane.
- The 2012 Dick Van Patten's Natural Balance float, featuring surfing bulldogs, was deemed the World's Heaviest and Longest Rose Parade float.
- The 2014 Public Storage "Adventures in Space" float featured 3 satellite alien spacecraft rolling down the front ramp and driving around to "discover life on planet Earth" before rolling back up the rear ramp into the spaceship. Public Storage's first ever entry in the parade was awarded the Grand Marshal's trophy for excellence in creative concept and design.
- In keeping with the 2014 parade's "Dreams Come True" theme, Aubrey Loots and Danny Leclair exchanged vows and were married atop a giant wedding cake float. It became the first same-sex marriage in the Rose Parade's 125-year history.
- The Disneyland Diamond Parade float was featured in 2016 in celebration for the 60th anniversary of the resort. It had 3 primary sections: Frozen, Mickey's section, and Star Wars. The float would also occasionally stop, allowing several Disney-owned characters to come out and dance to a medley of notable Disney songs.
- For the 2022 Cal Poly float, a football tribute was added in memory of Coach John Madden, who died prior to the parade and received degrees from Cal Poly. The football read "Madden, Ride High", referring to the school's fight song "Ride High You Mustangs".
- For 2023, Stoopid Buddy Studios, an award-winning animation studio best known for creating Robot Chicken, partnered with NFT collective Nouns for a float entitled "Meet the Nouns".
- Also in 2023, NASCAR sponsored a float in celebration of the auto racing circuit's 75th anniversary with a replica of the Los Angeles Memorial Coliseum's main entrance.
- For 2025, Universal Pictures commissioned a float to celebrate the New Year's Eve VOD release of Wicked (2024), the first installment of the musical's two-part film adaptation. The 55-foot-long float, dubbed "Defying Gravity," features 60,000 tulips imported from Holland, in addition to colorful carnations.
- Cal Poly Universities' 2026 float Jungle Jumpstart became the first self-built float to win the Sweepstakes Trophy
