= Shane Connolly =

Shane Connolly may refer to:

- Shane Connolly (Gaelic footballer)
- Shane Connolly (florist)
