= Brookside Park (Pasadena) =

Coordinates: 34.1526°N 118.1574°W

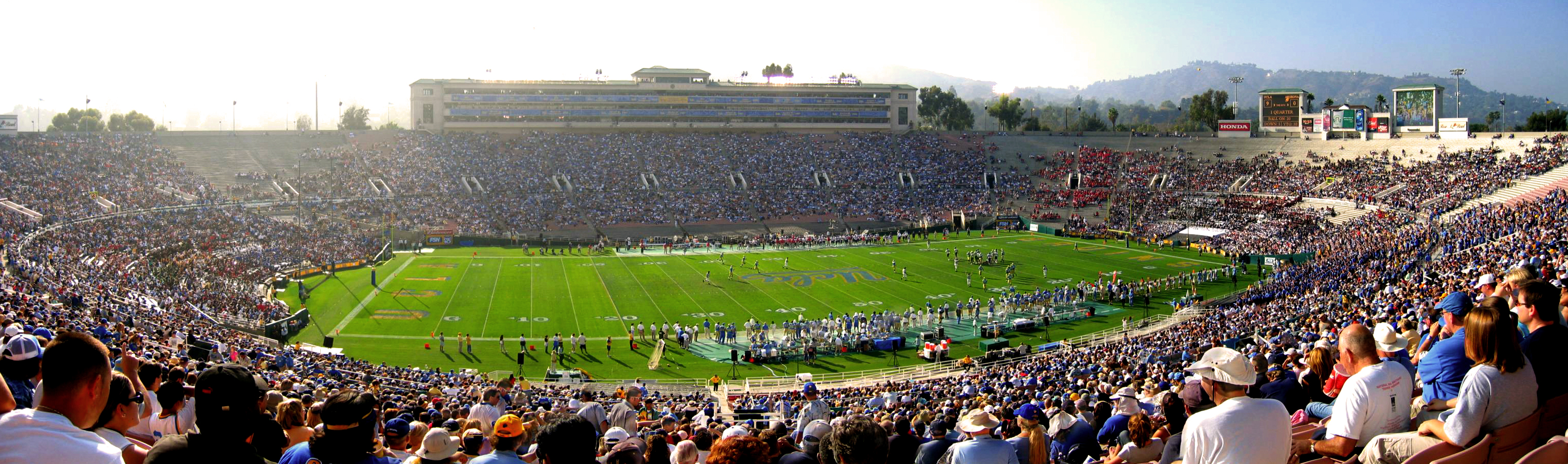
The Rose Bowl, at the center of Brookside Park

Brookside Park is a park in Pasadena, California.

== Landmarks ==
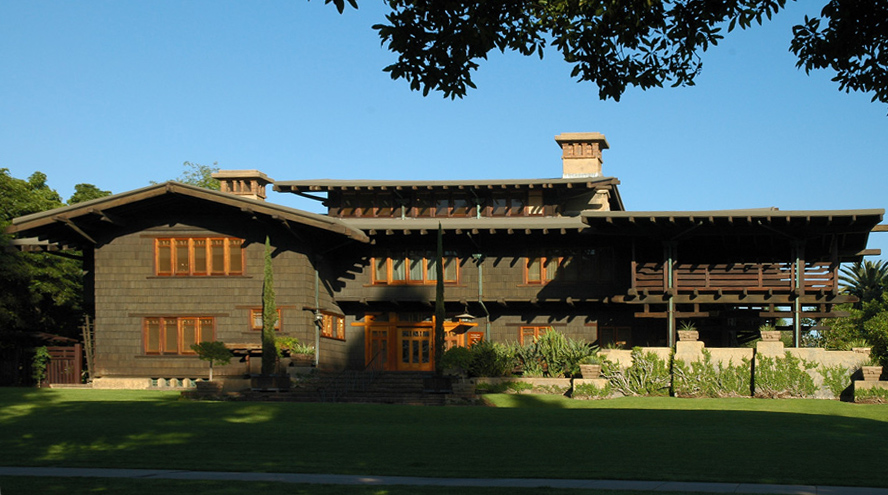
Gamble House was home to David B. Gamble of the Procter & Gamble company.

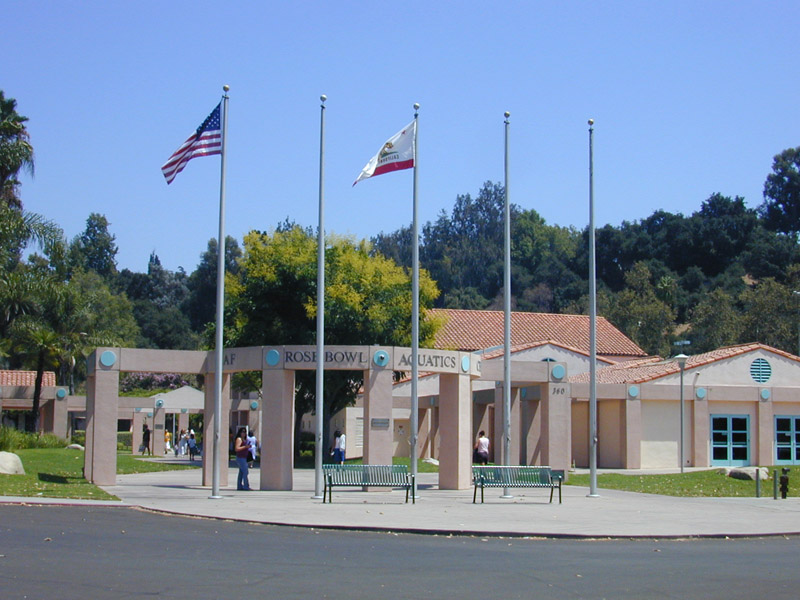
Rose Bowl Aquatics Center

The Arroyo Seco runs the length of the Brookside Park. At the very center of the park is the Rose Bowl, at the southern end is Brookside Park (the actual park) and the Gamble House, and at the northern end is the Brookside Golf Course. Colorado Street Bridges runs over Brookside Park.

- The Jackie Robinson Field is located at Brookside Park, next to the Rose Bowl where the UCLA Bruins play home football games
- Brookside Golf Course
- Kidspace Children's Museum
- Rose Bowl Aquatics Center
- Rosemont Pavilion and Brookside Pavilion where Rose Parade floats are decorated and viewed

== Transportation ==
Brookside Park is served solely by Pasadena ARTS routes 51 and 52.
