= Valley Hunt Club =

Social club in Pasadena, California, United States

The Valley Hunt Club is a private social club and booster organization located in Pasadena, California, that is most noted for starting the Tournament of Roses Parade in 1890.

Its members were former residents of the East and Midwest eager to showcase their new home's mild winter weather. "In New York, people are buried in snow", announced Professor Charles F. Holder at a Club meeting. "Here our flowers are blooming and our oranges are about to bear. Let's hold a festival to tell the world about our paradise."

During the next few years, the festival expanded to include marching bands and motorized floats. The games on the town lot (which was renamed Tournament Park in 1900) included ostrich races, bronco busting demonstrations, football and a race between a camel and an elephant (the elephant won). Viewing stands were built along the parade route, and Eastern newspapers began to take notice of the event. In 1895, the Tournament of Roses Association was formed to take charge of the festival, which had grown too large for the Valley Hunt Club to handle. After an interregnum of many decades (except for major anniversaries) the club again entered the parade in 1983, and now every year enters an antique carriage, typically a "roof seat break" pulled by friesian horses with outriders. The carriage and friesian horses are brought down to Pasadena the night before by the Leyendekker Family from Visalia—a tradition that has been ongoing for over 40 years.

The Valley Hunt Club continues to be located at 520 South Orange Grove Boulevard, Pasadena, CA 91105, which is the "Formation Area" of each year's Rose Parade and near Tournament House. The Valley Hunt Club remains an exclusive private social club. With the exception of the Wrigley Mansion, the current home of the Tournament of Roses Association, the Fenyes Mansion, and the Bissell House, the mansions of midwestern magnates that once stood alongside the Club on Orange Grove Avenue have been replaced by condominium and apartment complexes.

== See also ==
- Pasadena Tournament of Roses
- Tournament of Roses Parade
- Membership discrimination in California clubs
