= Kidspace Children's Museum =

Museum in Pasadena, California

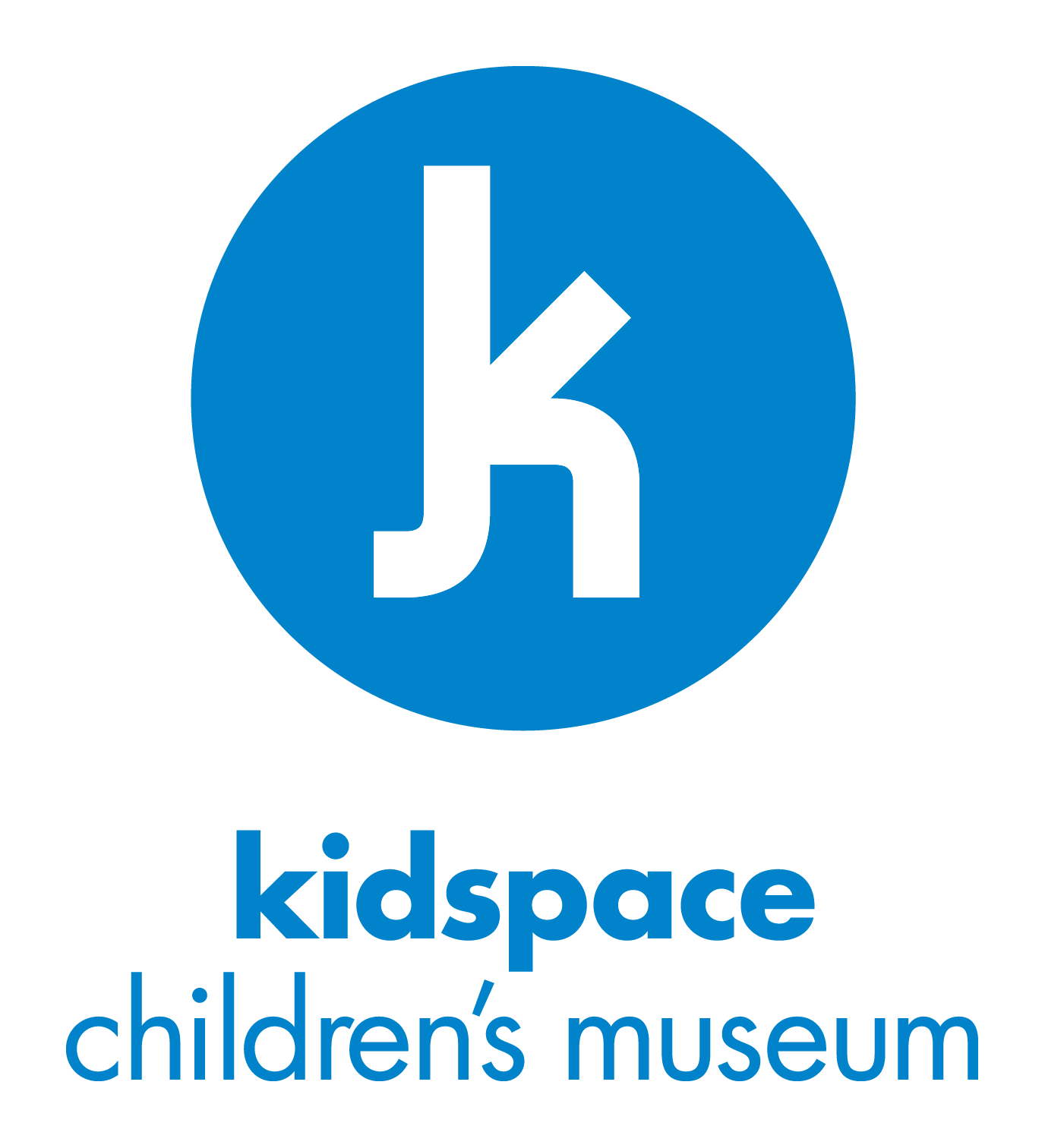
- Established: 1979
- Location: 480 N. Arroyo Blvd. Pasadena, California 91103
- Coordinates: 34°09′19″N 118°09′50″W
- Type: Nonprofit
- Visitors: 378,000
- Directors: Mike Bryant, Board President; Lisa Clements, Chief Executive Officer
- Website: www.kidspacemuseum.org

Kidspace Children's Museum is a children's museum in Pasadena, California. It is located next to the Rose Bowl, in the former Fannie E. Morrison Horticultural Center.

== History ==
Since the December 2004 opening of its new facility in Brookside Park, Pasadena, Kidspace Children's Museum has provided local community children with a space for creative and interactive learning.

=== Timeline ===
1979: Kidspace Children's Museum launched at the California Institute of Technology. A community project of the Junior League of Pasadena, Kidspace addressed an educational need in the San Gabriel Valley: increased access to the arts, humanities and sciences for children. Volunteers created and presented a prototype interactive exhibit, "Making Senses," designed to stimulate the interest of children by featuring robotics and neon light displays. More than 10,000 young visitors, their parents and teachers participated in the first exhibition during its six-week run.

1980: The museum opened its doors in the Rosemont Pavilion on Arroyo Seco parkland with "hands-on" exhibits. Among other organizations, exhibit design and construction were the product of community collaborations with NASA Jet Propulsion Laboratory, the Art Center College of Design and UNOCAL. Volunteers helping create the new museum included a Pasadena Unified School District superintendent, a Jet Propulsion Laboratory director and an originating director of the Princeton Junior Museum, all of whom provided expertise as members of the museum's first Board of Advisors.

1981: Kidspace leased a larger and more accessible site from Pasadena Unified School District in the heart of Pasadena. Later that year, Kidspace Children's Museum was incorporated as a private, nonprofit children's museum.

1982-1990: Kidspace introduced participatory exhibits and educational programs that engaged and educated children in the arts, humanities and sciences. Quarterly themes, such as Homes and Habitats, Seasons and Celebrations and Children of the World at Play, provided focus during public programming and school tours.

1991-1995: A new school programs coordinator met the needs of teachers to coordinate curriculum with visits to the museum. Campers enrolled in summer workshops and "Toddlers on the Move" provided parenting classes and developmental play. With the support of community volunteers and the Circle of Friends support group, the staff produced annual events, including the Rosebud Parade (a child-sized Rose Parade), the "creatively creepy" Haunted House, Critter Expo and the Eco-Arts Festival.

1996: The Kidspace Board of Directors adopted a plan to grow the museum from a small local attraction to a major Southern California cultural and educational destination.

2002: Kidspace closed its former site at McKinley School in Pasadena and began renovation of the historic Fannie Morrison Horticultural Center buildings at Brookside Park in the Arroyo Seco.

2005: The new Kidspace features 2.2 acres (8,900 m^{2}) of gardens.

2010: Kidspace embarked to expand its facilities by creating an outdoor physics-related area on the east side of the property. This area, known as Robert & Mary Galvin Physics Forest, encompassed almost an acre with 13 exhibits, all under a canopy of trees.

2012: Robert & Mary Galvin Physics Forest officially opened to the general public, July 2012. Galvin Physics Forest marked the first major addition to Kidspace since opening in Brookside Park in 2004. With support from the Honorary Committee, the stage was set for Kidspace to reach its potential as a leader in children's museums and informal education.

2013: The Imagination Workshop opened to the public in November 2013. The Imagination Workshop was built inside Roberts Pavilion in W.M. Keck Foundation Gallery. Funding for this project, came from The Campaign for the Future of Kidspace and was planned along with several other exhibit and program concepts as a part of an exhibit master plan, which detailed the next several projects to open at Kidspace over the next several years.

2014: S. Mark Taper Early Childhood Learning Center opened to the public, May 2014. The next project established by the exhibit master plan and funded by The Campaign for the Future of Kidspace.

2015 - 2016: Pepper Tree Music Jam opened to the public in November 2015, as the first exhibit to be featured in the upcoming Arroyo Adventure. Arroyo Adventure opened to the public in April 2016. It marked the next biggest enhancement to Kidspace since the addition of Galvin Physics Forest in 2012. The exhibit brought 8 brand-new experiences that encourage children to connect with nature, engage in adventures, and uncover possibilities between water and rocks, mud and sticks, and trees and native plants. In November 2016, Kidspace renovated Roberts Pavilion to include a dramatic and visual arts area called Storyteller Studio with four new exhibits that would give children the opportunity to express themselves through puppets, theatrical play, story books, and fine arts.

2017 - 2019: The Association of Children's Museum chose Kidspace as their host location for their InterActivity Conference for museum professionals in May 2017. The Kidspace On The Road program was expanded its outreach program offerings with the partnership with AEG's Goldenvoice to incorporate a family-friendly experience for the newly established Arroyo Seco Weekend music festival at the Rose Bowl. The Campaign for the Future of Kidspace met its fundraising goal of $13 million. Splash Dance Fountains would be the final exhibit enhancement project for the campaign and re-opened in 2018. Bean Sprouts Café opened.

2020: Kidspace appoints a new chief executive officer, Lisa Clements.

== Programs ==
Kidspace offers various programs for families, teachers, and community groups. Some of these programs are Summer and Spring day camps, group admission program for school visits, and special events like Sunset Music Series, Wired for Wonder and Kidspace Campout.

== Partners ==
Kidspace has received funding from individuals including Jud and Marilyn Roberts, the Boone Family, Mark Taper, and others. Community partnerships have been formed with the City of Pasadena, the Junior League of Pasadena, Nestle Corporation, and others.
