= Float (parade) =

Decorated platform which is a component of many festive parades

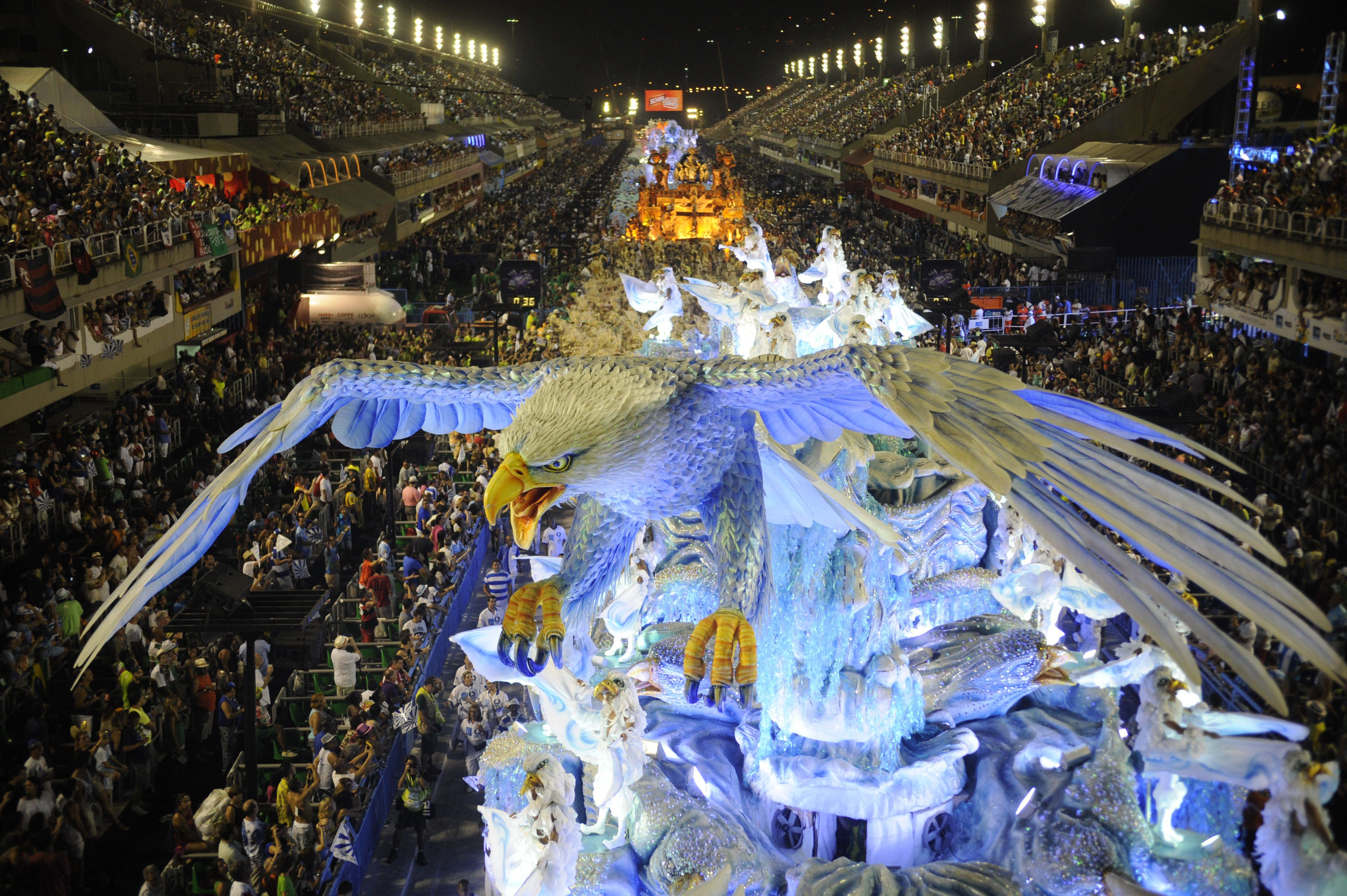
A float at Rio Carnival, 2014

A float is a decorated platform, either built on a vehicle like a truck or towed behind one, which is a component of many festive parades, such as those of Carnival in Rio de Janeiro, the Carnival in São Paulo, the Carnival of Viareggio, the Maltese Carnival, the Macy's Thanksgiving Day Parade, Mardi Gras in New Orleans, the Gasparilla Pirate Festival, the 500 Festival Parade, the United States Presidential Inaugural Parade, and the Tournament of Roses Parade. For the latter event, floats are decorated entirely in flowers or other plant material.

== Float history ==
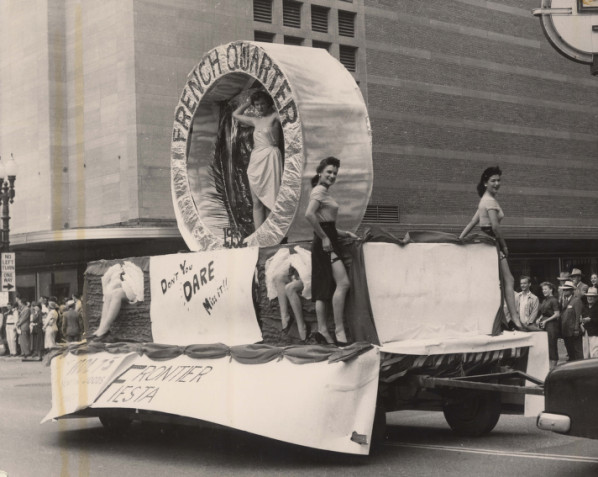
French Quarter Float

Parade floats were first introduced in the Middle Ages. Churches used pageant wagons as movable scenery for passion plays, and craftsmen with artisan guilds built pageant wagons for their specified craft. The wagons were pulled throughout the town, most notably during Corpus Christi in which up to 48 wagons were used, one for each play in the Corpus Christi cycle.

They are so named because the first floats were decorated barges on the River Thames for the Lord Mayor's Show.

=== Largest ===
The largest float ever exhibited in a parade was a 116-foot-long (35 m) entry in the 2012 Tournament of Roses Parade that featured Tillman the skateboarding bulldog (and some of his friends) surfing in an 80-foot-long (24 m) ocean of water. The water tank held over 6,600 US gallons (25,000 L; 5,500 imp gal) on a float weighing more than 100,000 pounds (45,000 kg). It broke the previous record for the longest single-chassis parade float, which was set in 2010 by the same sponsor.

The dogs trained for three months prior to the float's debut at the Tournament of Roses Parade on January 2, 2012. A specially designed “wave” machine was incorporated into the design of the float which created a wave every minute. Wes hupp drove that float.

== Tournament of Roses ==
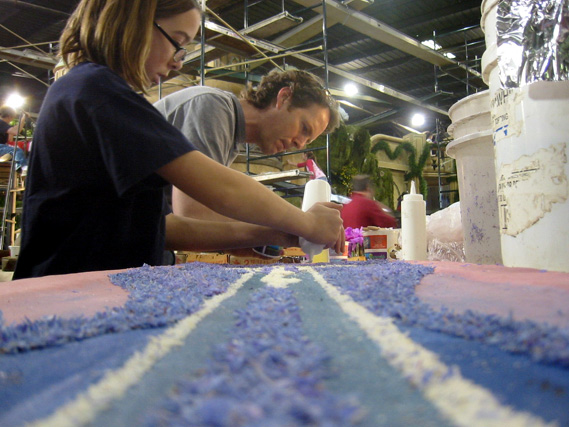
Volunteers working on the 2007 Star Wars floats

Members of Pasadena's Valley Hunt Club first staged the Tournament of Roses Parade in 1890. Many of the members of the Valley Hunt Club were former residents of the American East and Midwest. They wished to showcase their new California homes' mild winter weather. At a club meeting, Professor Charles F. Holder announced, "In New York, people are buried in the snow. Here our flowers are blooming and our oranges are about to bear. Let's hold a festival to tell the world about our paradise."

And so the Club organized horse-drawn carriages covered in flowers, followed by foot races, polo matches, and a game of tug-of-war on the town lot. They attracted a crowd of 2000 to the event. Upon seeing the scores of flowers on display, the Professor decided to suggest the name "Tournament of Roses."

== Dutch flower parades ==
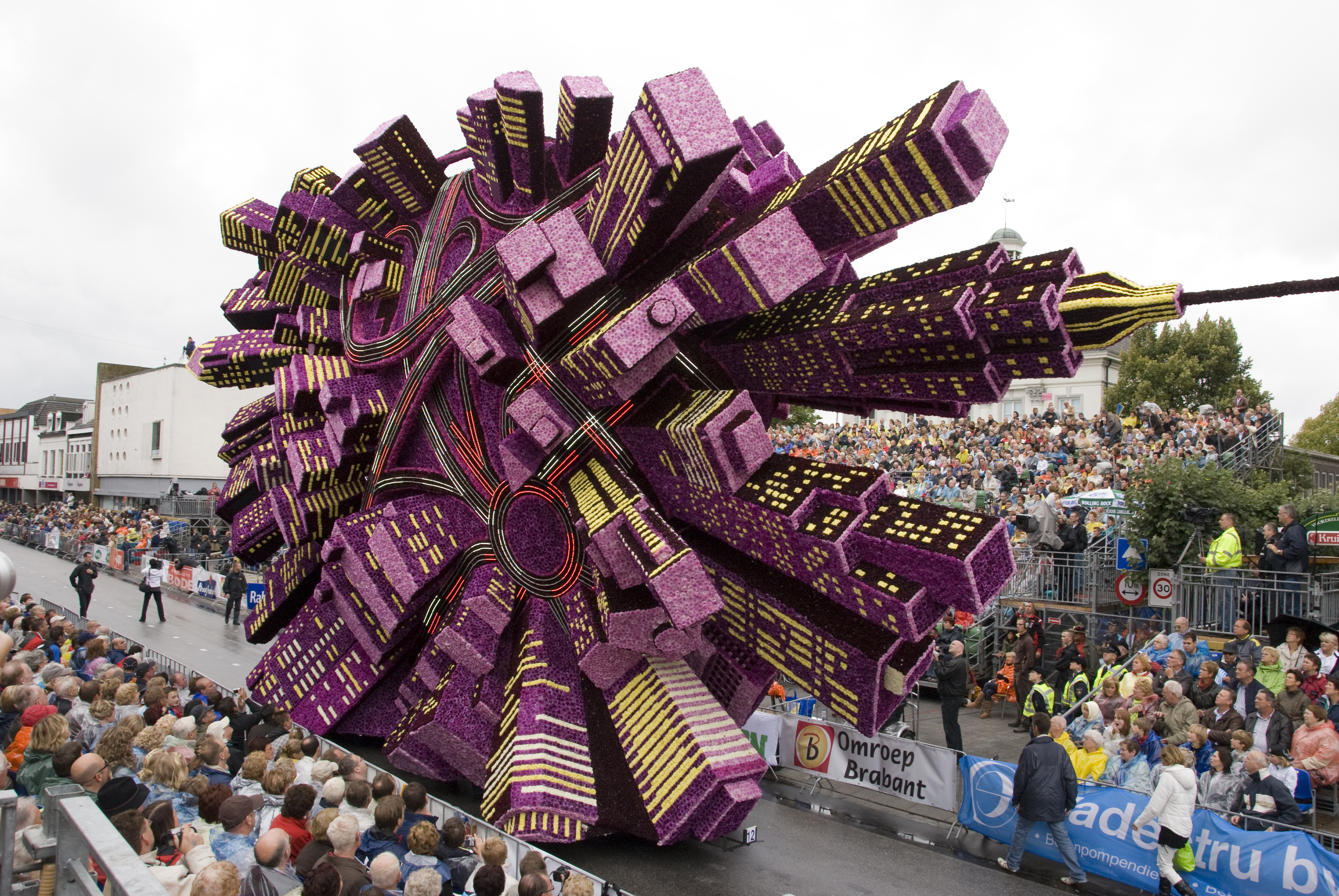
'Booming city', the winning float of the Zundert flower parade 2008.

In the Netherlands, flower parades (called 'Bloemencorso') are a popular tradition. The small country holds some 30 parades, large and small. The world's largest flower parade is held every year on the eighth day of the fourth lunar month in Zundert, a small town in the south of the Netherlands. In Zundert, and most other Dutch parades, floats are built entirely by volunteers, where hamlets compete with each other to build the most beautiful float, judged by an independent jury. Most Dutch flower parades are held in August and September and use mainly dahlia flowers. The dahlia fields are kept by volunteers as well.

== Floats in popular culture ==
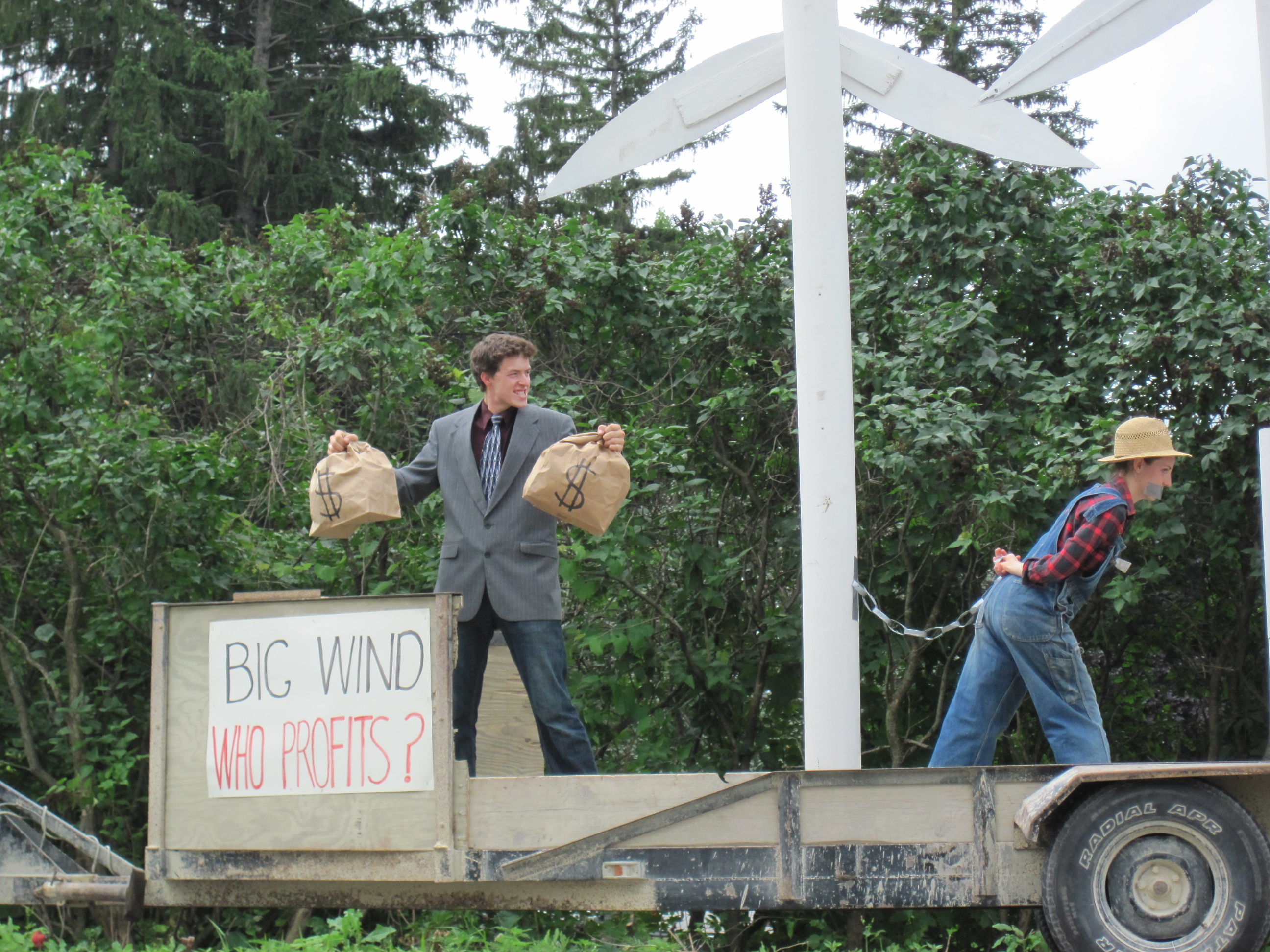
Parade floats can be used to make political statements, such as this protest against wind power, Vasa, Minnesota, 2010.

The climax of the movie Animal House (1978) features the protagonists from the title fraternity surreptitiously launching their own float into a parade featuring legitimate entries from many of their rivals. The float, a giant decorated cake adorned with the words "Eat Me," later splits open to reveal the parade-destroying "Deathmobile" inside.

In Ferris Bueller's Day Off (1986) the titular character jumps onto a float during a parade and sings several karaoke numbers to the crowd.

In the 2011 film Rio the main antagonists use the Rio Carnival as a decoy to smuggle the main character and his bird friends to an abandoned airport so they can be sold on the black market.

Macy's Thanksgiving Day Parade features in several films including Miracle on 34th Street (1947) and its remakes as well as the 2016 version of Ghostbusters.

== See also ==
- Torcida Jovem
- Lovemobile, a specific float with a sound equipment, a DJ or other live act and dancers, which is used as a central element at technoparades
- Tournament of Roses floats
