= Shane Connolly (florist) =

Northern Irish florist

Shane Connolly (born May 1963) is a Northern Irish florist. He entered the profession in the late 1980s after a brief career with the Ministry of Defence. Connolly founded his own floristry company in London in 1989. He was commissioned by the Royal Family to produce arrangements for the 2005 wedding of Prince Charles and Camilla Parker Bowles, the 2011 wedding of Prince William and Catherine Middleton and the 2023 coronation of Charles III and Camilla. Connolly is a proponent of sustainable floristry.

== Biography ==
Connolly was born in May 1963 in west Belfast; his father was a dentist and his mother a social worker. He developed a love of gardening and flower arranging from his mother and local florists. Connolly was educated at the Belfast School of Music from the age of 12. He aspired to become a singer but was persuaded to study science instead as a more suitable career for a boy.

After receiving a degree in psychology from the University of Ulster, Connolly moved to London in the late 1980s to work for the Ministry of Defence. He was unhappy with his work and met a florist; he found enjoyment in assisting the florist at weekends and on his holidays. Connolly also made the acquaintance of floral arrangers Michael Goulding and Elizabeth Barker, who mentored him and found him a position at the florists Pulbrook & Gould on Sloane Street. Another mentor was the rose breeder David C. H. Austin.

Connolly founded his own company, Shane Connolly & Co, in London in 1989. He has arranged flowers for Vogue magazine and the Royal Academy of Arts. Connolly tries to practise sustainable floristry, incorporating live plants into his works which can be replanted afterwards rather than dying and being thrown away. He has not used plastic floral foam since 2012 and instead keeps his arrangements watered with tubes and reservoirs and supports them with chicken wire and twigs. Connolly is a trustee of Floral Angels, a charity that donates flowers to hospices and refuges.

Connolly has written five books on flowers: Table Flowers (1996), Shane Connolly Wedding Flowers (1998), The Language of Flowers (2003), A Year in Flowers (2012) and Rediscovering the Meaning of Flowers (2017). He continues to sing and is a member of The Bach Choir.

== Royal arrangements ==
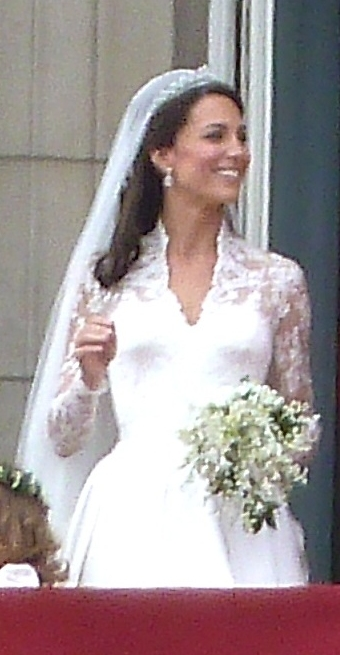
Catherine, Duchess of Cambridge, with her wedding bouquet

Connolly's work attracted the attention of the British Royal Family after he arranged flowers for a Duke of Edinburgh's Gold Award event at St James's Palace. He afterwards received a number of commissions from the Prince of Wales (the future Charles III), including for his 2005 marriage to Camilla Parker Bowles. His arrangements used only British-grown flowers. Connolly was later commissioned to make a copy of his wedding bouquet in artificial flowers to be exhibited alongside Camilla's wedding dress at the Victoria and Albert Museum.

Connolly held a royal warrant for Charles, as Prince of Wales, and for Elizabeth II as monarch. Connolly was also commissioned to oversee the floral arrangements at Westminster Abbey and Buckingham Palace for the 2011 wedding of Prince William and Catherine Middleton. Again he used only British-grown flowers. He had intended to line the Abbey with trees in blossom but since the season was not favourable, he switched to field maples. The 20-foot (6.1 m) tall trees were afterwards planted at Charles' home, Highgrove House. Connolly arranged the flowers at the Abbey for the 2023 coronation of Charles III and Camilla. In 2024, his was among the first batch of seven royal warrants issued by Queen Camilla. He was also awarded a Royal Warrant from HM The King and an MBE in the Birthday Honours 2025.
