= Holder =

Holder may refer to:

== Law ==
- Holder (law), a person that has in their custody a promissory note, bill of exchange or cheque
- Holder v Holder, an English trusts law case
- Holder v. Humanitarian Law Project (2010), a U.S. Supreme Court decision

== People ==
- Holder (surname)
- Holder da Silva (born 1988), Guinea-Bissauan sprinter

== Places ==
- Holder, Australian Capital Territory, a suburb of Canberra
- Holder, South Australia, a locality
- Holder, Florida, United States, an unincorporated community
- Holder, Illinois, United States, a town
- Holder Plantation, Jackson County, Georgia, United States, on the National Register of Historic Places
- Holder Peak, Princess Elizabeth Land, Antarctica

== Ships ==
- USS Holder (DE-401), a US destroyer escort
- USS Holder (DD-819), a US destroyer

== Other uses ==
- Holder (American football)
- Holder baronets, a title in the Baronetage of the United Kingdom

== See also ==
- Hold (disambiguation)
- Hölder (disambiguation)
- Holder Formation, a geologic formation in the Sacramento Mountains of New Mexico
- Holder 17, an American sailboat design
- Holder 20, an American sailboat design
- Hoelder
- Hodler (disambiguation)
