= Holder (surname) =

Holder is a surname.

Notable people with the surname include:

== Academics and literature ==
- Alfred Holder (1840–1916), Austrian-German classicist
- Colleen Holder, Trinidad and Tobago news presenter and producer
- Michelle Holder, American economist
- Nancy Holder (born 1953), American writer
- William Holder (1616–1698), English music theorist

== Activism ==
- Elma Holder, American elder rights activist

== Entertainment ==
- Albrecht Holder (born 1958), German classical bassoonist
- Boscoe Holder (1921–2007), Trinidadian dancer, choreographer and painter
- Christian Holder (1949–2025), British-Trinidadian dancer and choreographer, son of Boscoe
- Erich Holder (1901–1974), German film producer
- Geoffrey Holder (1930–2014), Trinidadian-American character actor, choreographer and dancer
- Joseph William Holder (1764–1832), English composer
- Meagan Holder, American actress
- Noddy Holder (born 1946), English musician and actor
- Peter Holder (organist) (born 1990), British organist and musician
- Ram John Holder (born 1934), Guyanese-British actor and musician
- Roy Holder (1946–2021), English television actor

== Journalism ==
- Peter Holder (born 1964), Australian journalist and writer

== Military and naval ==
- Burton Allen Holder (1843–1920), Chickasaw Indian, Confederate officer in the American Civil War
- Randolph M. Holder (1918–1942), American naval aviator

== Politics and government ==
- Eric H. Holder, Jr. (born 1951), United States Attorney General from 2009 to 2015
- Frederick Holder (1850–1909), South Australian politician
- Janice M. Holder (born 1949), American jurist
- Trevor Holder (born 1973), Canadian politician

== Religion ==
- Christopher Holder (c. 1631–1688), Anglo-American Quaker minister

== Science and technology ==
- Charles Frederick Holder (1851–1915), American naturalist, science writer, and sport fisherman
- Joseph Bassett Holder (1824–1888), American zoologist and physician
- Livingston L. Holder, Jr. (born 1956), American former astronaut; space company executive
- Otto Hölder (1859–1937), German mathematician

== Sport ==
- Adzil Holder (1931–2019), Barbadian cricketer
- Alijah Holder (born 1996), American football player
- Bob Holder (born 1931), Australian rodeo competitor
- Chemar Holder (born 1998), Barbadian cricket player
- Edward Holder (1908–1974), All Black rugby league player
- Jason Holder (born 1991), Barbadian and West Indies cricket player
- John Holder (cricketer) (born 1945), cricketer and umpire
- Kyle Holder (born 1994), American professional baseball player
- Nikkita Holder (born 1987), Canadian Olympic 100 m hurdler and Pan American medalist
- Phil Holder (born 1952), English football manager and coach
- Rieah Holder (born 1993), Barbadian netball player
- Roland Holder (born 1967), West Indian cricketer
- Tra Holder (born 1995), Thai-American Basketball player
- Vanburn Holder (born 1945), West Indian cricketer
- Will Holder (American football) (born 1975), American Arena Football League player

== Fictional characters ==
- Alexander Holder, a character in The Adventure of the Beryl Coronet, a Sherlock Holmes story by Arthur Conan Doyle
- Stephen Holder, a character on the American crime drama television series The Killing
