= List of John Jay College of Criminal Justice people =

The John Jay College of Criminal Justice is a public college focused on criminal justice located in New York City. It is a senior college of the City University of New York (CUNY). The following are notable alumni of the John Jay College of Criminal Justice.

== Alumni ==
=== Entertainment ===
- Petri Hawkins-Byrd (BS 1989), television personality known for his role as bailiff for entire series run of 25 seasons of Judge Judy (1996–2021)
- Eva Norvind (MA), actor and director
- Pauley Perrette, actor best known for her role as Abby Scuito on NCIS

=== Government ===
- Ronald Spadafora (BA), New York City Fire Department Chief

=== Law ===
- Edward Thomas Brady (MS 1977), trial attorney and former Associate Justice of the Supreme Court of North Carolina
- Kenneth P. Thompson (BA 1989), former Kings County District Attorney (2014–2016) and former attorney for Dominique Strauss-Kahn accuser Nafissatou Diallo

=== Law enforcement ===
- Edward A. Flynn (MA 1976), former chief of the Milwaukee Police Department
- Henry Lee (BS '72), commissioner of the Connecticut Department of Public Safety; forensic scientist and founder of the Henry C. Lee Institute of Forensic Science
- James P. O'Neill (BA), New York Police Department commissioner
- John Timoney (BA 1974), chief of the Miami Police Department (2003–10)
- Ariel Rios (BS 1976), undercover special agent for the Bureau of Alcohol, Tobacco, Firearms and Explosives (ATF), killed in the line of duty

=== Literature ===
- Jennings Michael Burch (BA), author of the memoir They Cage the Animals at Night
- Dorothy Uhnak (BA), novelist

=== Politics ===
- Eric Adams (BA 1998), 111th Mayor of New York City (2022–2025); 18th Borough President of Brooklyn (2014–2021)
- Karl A. Brabenec (MPA 2005), New York State Assemblyman representing district 98
- Elisa Crespo (BA 2019), transgender activiest, executive director of the New Pride Agenda, former candidate for the 15th District in the 2021 New York City Council election
- Marcos Crespo (BA 2004), former New York State Assemblyman representing district 85
- Catalina Cruz (BA 2005), New York State Assemblyman representing district 39 in Queens
- Alison Esposito, Republican nominee for Lieutenant Governor of New York; officer with the New York City Police Department
- Kenneth Gittens (BS), Majority Leader of the Legislature of the Virgin Islands
- Miguel Martinez (BA 1994), New York City Council member, who was convicted of conspiracy
- Ronald Rice, New Jersey Senate
- Scott Stringer (BA 1986) (born 1960), former New York City Comptroller (2014–2021), Manhattan Borough President (2006–2013)
- Lovely A. Warren (BA 2000), 67th Mayor of Rochester, New York
- Beatrice Welters (M.A. 1974), United States Ambassador to Trinidad and Tobago

=== Sports ===
- Craig Noto (BA 1992), college baseball coach

== Faculty, past and present ==
- Milton Allimadi, author and co-founder of Black Star News
- Preeti Chauhan, Ph.D., researcher and professor of psychology
- James DiGiovanna, author and award-winning film reviewer and filmmaker
- Sofija Grandakovska, author in the field of comparative literature studies and interdisciplinary studies in Holocaust, Jewish history, literature and culture
- Michelle Holder, economist and author
- Saul Kassin, distinguished professor of psychology best known for starting the scientific study of police-induced false confessions
- Jane Katz, Olympic swimmer and member of the National Jewish Sports Hall of Fame
- David M. Kennedy, author of Don't Shoot (2011) and professor of criminology
- Ralph Larkin, sociologist
- Nathan H. Lents, scientist and author
- Audre Lorde, African-American poet and political activist
- John Matteson, winner of the Pulitzer Prize in 2008 for the biography Eden's Outcasts: The Story of Louisa May Alcott and Her Father
- Peter Moskos, former Baltimore Police Department officer and author of Cop in the Hood
- Kevin Nadal, notable Filipino-American professor, author, and microaggressions researcher
- Serena Nanda (born 1938), author, anthropologist, and professor emeritus
- Steven Penrod, distinguished professor of psychology specializing in the studies of jury decision-making and eyewitness testimony.
- Rosalie Purvis, theater director and choreographer
- Flora Rheta Schreiber, author of Sibyl (1973)
- Lloyd George Sealy, NYPD's first African-American officer to graduate from the FBI National Academy and the first African-American officer in the NYPD to make rank as the commander of a police station
- Jay Sexter, psychologist and President Emeritus of Mercy College
- Ilyasah Shabazz, author, social activist, and daughter of Malcolm X and Betty Shabazz
- Mike Wallace, co-author of the 1999 Pulitzer Prize-winning Gotham: A History of New York City to 1898
- Benjamin Ward, first African-American New York City Police Commissioner
- Nick Wasicsko, youngest-ever mayor of Yonkers, and the youngest mayor in a major American city
- Cathy Spatz Widom, distinguished professor of psychology and expert on the long-term consequences of child abuse and neglect, winner of 2016 Stockholm Prize in Criminology
