= Joseph Holder =

Joseph Holder may refer to:

- Joseph Bassett Holder (1824–1888), American zoologist and physician
- Joseph William Holder (1764–1832), English composer
