= Griboyedov =

Griboyedov may refer to:

- Alexander Griboyedov (1795-1829), Russian playwright and diplomat
- Griboyedov Canal, a canal in the Russian city of Saint Petersburg
- Griboyedov, Armenia, a town in the Armavir Province of Armenia
- Griboyedov Prize, a Russian literary award

== See also ==
- Valerian Gribayedoff (1858–1908), Russian artist and journalist
