= Hold =

Hold may refer to:

== Physical spaces ==
- Hold (compartment), interior cargo space
- Baggage hold, cargo space on an airplane
- Stronghold, a castle or other fortified place

== Arts, entertainment, and media ==
- Hold (musical term), a pause, also called a Fermata
- Hold (album), 2023 album by Wild Nothing
- "Hold" (song), a song by Vera Blue
- "Hold", a song by Axium from Blindsided
- "Hold", a song by Saves the Day from I'm Sorry I'm Leaving
- Hold, in a card game (e.g., blackjack or poker, the cards that are kept in a hand, not those discarded and replaced
- Handhold (dance), a type of hold in dance
- Hold (novel) a novel by Michael Donkor
- "The Hold", a short story in the 1996 collection Dark Water by Koji Suzuki
- Hold (musician), an alias of Irish musician Liam McCay/Sign Crushes Motorist

== Law ==
- Legal hold, a legal ruling or official declaration
- Senate hold, a US parliamentary procedure

== Sports ==
- Hold (baseball), a statistic that may be awarded to a relief pitcher
- Climbing hold, on climbing walls
- Grappling hold, a specific grip applied to an opponent in wrestling or martial arts

== Technology ==
- Hold (aviation), a manoeuvre designed to delay an aircraft already in flight while keeping it within a specified airspace
- Hold (telephone), a condition wherein a call is not terminated, but the connection is held and no speech can take place
- Authorization hold, a now common practice by bankers and retailers (especially gas stations)

== Other uses ==
- Hold (title), an ancient Anglo-Danish and Norwegian title
- holD, a bacterial gene
- Hold or on hold, library books or other borrowed materials reserved for a particular borrower's use
- Marianne Hold (1933–1994), German actress
- Trevor Hold (1939-2004), English composer, poet and author

== See also ==
- Holder (disambiguation)
- Holding (disambiguation)
- To Have and to Hold (disambiguation)
