= Pentalofos =

Pentalofos may refer to several places in Greece:

- Pentalofos, Evros, a village in the Evros regional unit
- Pentalofos, Kozani, a village in the Kozani regional unit
- Pentalofos, Thessaloniki, a village in the Thessaloniki regional unit, part of the municipality Kallithea
