= Death of Sun-Ming Sheu =

2010 death of a man from Queens

Sun-Ming Sheu (1969 – June 26, 2010), sometimes referred to by the nickname Sunny Sheu, was a Taiwanese immigrant living in Queens, New York who was found unresponsive on June 26, 2010. After several passersby called 9-1-1, Sheu was transported by ambulance to Flushing Hospital Medical Center, where he would later die as a result of head trauma. The death was ruled as accidental by the New York Police Department. After his death, a video was released in which Sheu described his ongoing struggles with alleged judicial corruption surrounding a case of mortgage fraud committed against him in 2000. Sheu also stated that he felt that his life had been threatened by the police and the Queens County District Attorney's Office. The circumstances of Sheu's legal complications and his death have led to him being labelled as a whistleblower by several media outlets, and calls for a full investigation of his death have been raised by several journalists.

== Background ==
In 2001, Sheu's house was foreclosed on by Tower Insurance due to an unpaid mortgage with Centex Home Equity. Sheu claimed that he was the victim of mortgage fraud involving a forged power of attorney, and the parties involved had already been arrested for the document forgery. The case was assigned to Justice Joseph Golia of Queens County Supreme Court. Justice Golia granted summary judgment in favor of Centex, and the property was foreclosed on July 21, 2004. Following the case, Sheu continued to explore legal avenues and, in the process, investigated Justice Golia's real-estate holdings, noticing discrepancies between his actual holdings and those disclosed on his ethics reports. In 2009, Sheu informed the FBI that he believed that Justice Golia was complicit with the parties involved in the mortgage fraud. After filing a formal complaint, the Office of Court Administration informed Sheu that Justice Golia's amended ethics reports were available for viewing. Sheu proceeded to record a video alleging that if anything happened to him, Justice Golia was a primary suspect (the video was later made public a day after Sheu's death). Sheu then informed the FBI that he believed his life was in danger, and alleged that he had been threatened by NYPD detectives in 2009. After viewing the amended ethics reports on June 23, 2010, Sheu still noticed discrepancies between Justice Golia's real-estate holdings and those disclosed on the reports.

== Death ==
On June 26, 2010, several passerby found Sheu collapsed and unresponsive outside of a warehouse in College Point, Queens. Sheu was taken to Flushing Hospital Medical Center, at which point two of Sheu's friends (Will Galison and Sherry Bobrowsky) received a call from an NYPD officer who had retrieved Sheu's phone, informing them that Sheu was hospitalized. By the time they arrived, Sheu had been pronounced dead. Although the NYPD officer had informed the two that Sheu had experienced head trauma, ER doctor Zeeshan Ahmed told them that a CAT scan had shown no signs of trauma, with the cause of death being ruled an aneurysm. However, a supervisor at the Queens medical examiner's office later informed them that a three-inch wound was present on the back of Sheu's head. Sheu's cause of death was then ruled blunt force trauma to the head. The NYPD refused to investigate the death further, insisting that Sheu's cause of death was most likely an aneurysm or seizure.

== Reactions ==
=== Media coverage ===
Prior to his death, Sheu's mortgage fraud allegations received coverage in Black Star News. After his death, Black Star News continued to report on developments in his case and repeatedly called for a proper investigation. Black Star News's reporting was picked up by other outlets such as Business Insider.

The Indypendent reported on Sheu's death in 2023, discussing reignited calls for an investigation, and stating that "we will never get any answers regarding Sheu’s death until someone with power starts asking questions."

=== Public Figures ===
New York City Mayor Eric Adams, then a New York State Senator, was approached by Sheu in 2010 for advice on how to deal with the alleged threats he had received from NYPD detectives. Galison claims that Sheu was simply told to draw up an "action plan." After Sheu's death, Galison called Adams to request an investigation be carried out. Adams informed Galison that he lacked the power to order an investigation, but suggested that an investigative reporter could "get the ball rolling." In 2023, The Indypendent contacted Adams to ask if he was aware of calls for an investigation into Sheu's death, to which he responded, "Yes. All crimes are properly investigated."
