= Application software =

Any computer program for end-user use

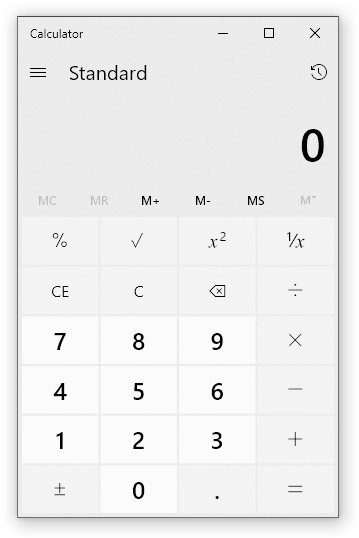
Windows Calculator, a calculator application, running on Windows 10

Application software is software that is intended for end-user use – not operating, administering or programming a computer. It includes programs such as word processors, web browsers, media players, and mobile applications used in daily tasks. An application (app, application program, software application) is any program that can be categorized as application software. Application is a subjective classification that is often used to differentiate from system and utility software.

Application software represents the user-facing layer of computing systems, designed to translate complex system capabilities into task-oriented, goal-driven workflows. Unlike system software, which focuses on hardware orchestration and resource management, application software is centered on problem abstraction, user interaction, and domain-specific functionality.

The abbreviation app became popular with the 2008 introduction of the iOS App Store, to refer to applications for mobile devices such as smartphones and tablets. Later, with the release of the Mac App Store in 2010 and the Windows Store in 2011, it began to be used to refer to end-user software in general, regardless of platform.

Applications may be bundled with the computer and its system software or published separately. Applications may be proprietary or open-source.

== Terminology ==
=== Meaning program and software ===
When used as an adjective, application can have a broader meaning than that described in this article. For example, concepts such as application programming interface (API), application server, application virtualization, application lifecycle management and portable application refer to programs and software in general.

=== Distinction between system and application software ===
The distinction between system and application software is subjective and has been the subject of controversy. For example, one of the key questions in the United States v. Microsoft Corp. antitrust trial was whether Microsoft's Internet Explorer web browser was part of its Windows operating system or a separate piece of application software. As another example, the GNU/Linux naming controversy is, in part, due to disagreement about the relationship between the Linux kernel and the operating systems built over this kernel. In some types of embedded systems, the application software and the operating system software may be indistinguishable by the user, as in the case of software used to control a VCR, DVD player, or microwave oven. The above definitions may exclude some applications that may exist on some computers in large organizations. For an alternative definition of an app: see Application Portfolio Management.

=== Killer application ===
A killer application (killer app, coined in the late 1980s) is an application that is so popular that it causes demand for its host platform to increase. For example, VisiCalc was the first modern spreadsheet software for the Apple II and helped sell the then-new personal computers into offices. For the BlackBerry, it was its email software.

=== Software suite ===
A software suite consists of multiple applications bundled together. They usually have related functions, features, and user interfaces, and may be able to interact with each other, e.g. open each other's files. Business applications often come in suites, e.g. Microsoft Office, LibreOffice and iWork, which bundle together a word processor, a spreadsheet, etc.; but suites exist for other purposes, e.g. graphics or music.

== Ways to classify ==
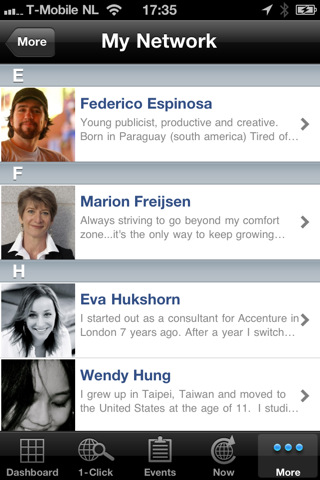
Application software on a mobile phone

As there so many applications and since their attributes vary so dramatically, there are many different ways to classify them.

=== By legal aspects ===
Proprietary software is protected under an exclusive copyright, and a software license grants limited usage rights. Such applications may allow add-ons from third parties.

Free and open-source software (FOSS) can be run, distributed, sold, and extended for any purpose. FOSS software released under a free license may be perpetual and also royalty-free. Perhaps, the owner, the holder or third-party enforcer of any right (copyright, trademark, patent, or ius in re aliena) are entitled to add exceptions, limitations, time decays or expiring dates to the license terms of use.

Public-domain software is a type of FOSS that is royalty-free and can be run, distributed, modified, reversed, republished, or created in derivative works without any copyright attribution and therefore revocation. It can even be sold, but without transferring the public domain property to other single subjects. Public-domain software can be released under a (un)licensing legal statement, which enforces those terms and conditions for an indefinite duration (for a lifetime, or forever).

=== By platform ===
An application can be categorized by the host platform on which it runs. Notable platforms include operating system (native), web browser, cloud computing and mobile. For example a web application runs in a web browser whereas a more traditional, native application runs in the environment of a computer's operating system.

There has been a contentious debate regarding web applications replacing native applications for many purposes, especially on mobile devices such as smartphones and tablets. Web apps have indeed greatly increased in popularity for some uses, but the advantages of applications make them unlikely to disappear soon, if ever. Furthermore, the two can be complementary, and even integrated.

=== Horizontal vs. vertical ===
Application software can be seen as either horizontal or vertical. Horizontal applications are more popular and widespread, because they are general purpose, for example word processors or databases. Vertical applications are niche products, designed for a particular type of industry or business, or department within an organization. Integrated suites of software will try to handle every specific aspect possible of, for example, manufacturing or banking worker, accounting, or customer service.

=== By purpose ===
There are many types of application software:

Enterprise
Addresses the needs of an entire organization's processes and data flows, across several departments, often in a large distributed environment. Examples include enterprise resource planning systems, customer relationship management (CRM) systems, data replication engines, and supply chain management software. Departmental Software is a sub-type of enterprise software with a focus on smaller organizations or groups within a large organization. (Examples include travel expense management and IT Helpdesk.)

Enterprise infrastructure
Provides common capabilities needed to support enterprise software systems. (Examples include databases, email servers, and systems for managing networks and security.)

Application platform as a service (aPaaS)
A cloud computing service that offers development and deployment environments for application services.

Knowledge worker
Lets users create and manage information, often for and individual media editors may aid in multiple information worker tasks.

Content access
Used primarily to access content without editing, but may include software that allows for content editing. Such software addresses the needs of individuals and groups to consume digital entertainment and published digital content. (Examples include media players, web browsers, and help browsers.)

Educational
Related to content access software, but has the content or features adapted for use by educators or students. For example, it may deliver evaluations (tests), track progress through material, or include collaborative capabilities.

Simulation
Simulates physical or abstract systems for either research, training, or entertainment purposes.

Media development
Generates print and electronic media for others to consume, most often in a commercial or educational setting. This includes graphic-art software, desktop publishing software, multimedia development software, HTML editors, digital-animation editors, digital audio and video composition, and many others.

Engineering
Used in developing hardware and software products. This includes computer-aided design (CAD), computer-aided engineering (CAE), computer language editing and compiling tools, integrated development environments, and application programmer interfaces.

Entertainment
Refers to video games, screen savers, programs to display motion pictures or play recorded music, and other forms of entertainment which can be experienced through the use of a computing device.

== Taxonomy ==
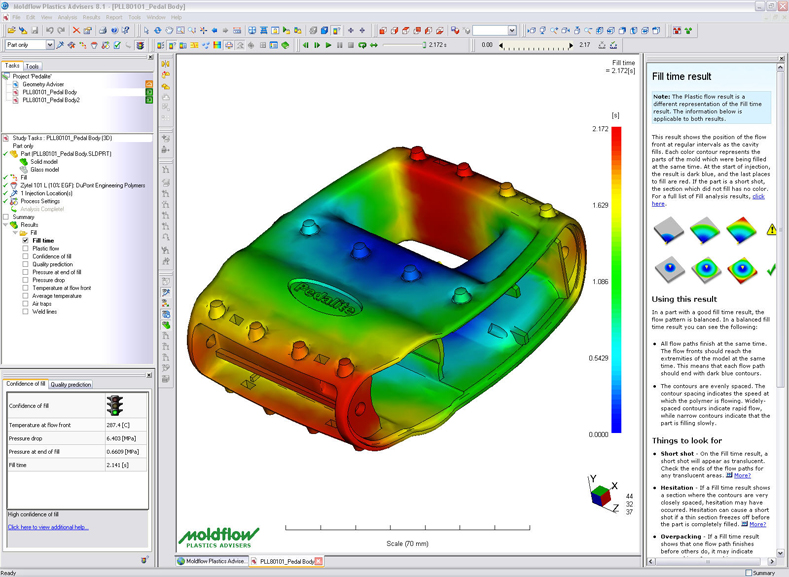
Application software for a desktop or laptop computer

This section is a taxonomy of kinds of applications. This organization is but one of many different ways to organize them. A kind is included in only one category even if it logically fits in multiple.

=== General-purpose ===
- Calculator
- Spreadsheet
- Web browser
- Web mapping
- E-commerce
- Social media

=== Communication ===
- Chat
- Email
- Presentation software
- Phone
- Messages
- Networking software
- Web conferencing

=== Documentation ===
- Desktop publishing software
- Document automation
- Text editor
- Word processor

=== Data management ===
- Building information management
- Contact manager
- Content management system
- Database management system
- Digital asset management
- Document management
- Geographic information system

=== Resource management ===
- Booking software
- Digital calendar
- Employee scheduling software
- Enterprise resource planning
- Event log
- Field service management
  - Workforce management software
- File manager
- Productivity software
- Project management software
- Reservation systems
- Server management system
- Settings
- Workflow software

=== Financial software ===
- Banking software
- Clearing systems
- Accounting software

=== Video game ===
- Arcade video game
- Console game
- Mobile game
- Personal computer game
- Simulation game
  - Vehicle simulation game

=== Simulation ===
- Computational science
- Social simulation
- Military simulation
- Flight simulator
- Driving simulator

=== Media ===
- 3D computer graphics software
- Animation software
- Demoscene
- Graphic art software
  - Raster graphics editor
  - Vector graphics editor
- Image organizer
- Video editing software
- Audio editing software
  - Digital audio workstation
- Music sequencer
  - Scorewriter
- News
- Screen capturing
- Software art

=== Engineering software such as Hardware engineering ===
- Computer-aided design
- Computer-aided engineering
- Computer-aided manufacturing
- Finite element analysis

=== Software development ===
Software designed and intended for software development is classified as application software even though utility software is commonly used in the process of developing software. Categories of software development application software include:

- Integrated development environment
- Game development tool
- HTML editor
- License manager
- Source code editor
- Version control

== See also ==
- Mobile app – Software application designed to run on mobile devices
- Server (computing) – Computer providing a central resource or service
- Software development – Creation and maintenance of software
- Super-app – Mobile application that provides multiple services including financial transactions
- Web application – Application that uses a web browser as a client
