= Holding =

Holding may refer to:

== Film and television ==
- The Holding (film), 2011 British film
- "Holding", an episode of the American animated television series Beavis and Butt-Head
- Holding (TV series), a 2022 TV series based on the book by Graham Norton
- The Miroslav Holding Co., 2001 Croatian film, also released as Holding

== Other uses ==
- Holding an object with the hands, or grasping
- Holding, a novel by Graham Norton
- Holding (aeronautics), a manoeuvre in aviation
- Holding (American football), a common penalty in American football
- Holding (law), the central determination in a judicial opinion
- Holding (surname)
- Holding company, a company that owns stock in other companies

== See also ==
- Smallholding
- Hold (disambiguation)
- The Holding (disambiguation)
- "Holdin'," a song by Diamond Rio
- Hoarding
- Possession (law)
