= Horizontal market software =

In computer software, horizontal market software is a type of application software that is useful in a wide range of industries. This is the opposite of vertical market software, which has a scope of usefulness limited to few industries. Horizontal market software is also known as "productivity software."

== Example ==
Examples of horizontal market software include word processors, web browsers, spreadsheets, calendars, project management applications, and generic bookkeeping applications. Since horizontal market software is developed to be used by a broad audience, it generally lacks any market-specific customizations.

== See also ==
- Horizontal market
- Vertical market software
- Enterprise resource planning
