= Barbara Allimadi =

Ugandan human rights activist (1972–2020)

- Born: 1972; Uganda
- Died: 27 April 2020 (aged 48); Kiwaatule, Kampala, Uganda
- Education: Gayaza High School; London Metropolitan University; Makerere University
- Occupations: politician and human rights activist
- Political party: Forum for Democratic Change, Alliance for National Transformation
- Father: Otema Allimadi
- Relatives: Milton Allimadi (brother)
- Website: https://www.barbaraallimadifoundation.org/

Barbara Ann Allimadi (c. 1972 – 27 April 2020) was a Ugandan politician and human rights activist. She was known for organising the "bra protest" and for her arrest after staging a demonstration in parliament with the Concerned Citizens group.

== Early life ==
Allimadi was born in Uganda and her parents were Eriphas Otema Allimadi, the third Prime Minister of Uganda (1980–1985), and Alice Lamunu Allimadi. She was one of her fathers seventeen children. Her brother is Milton Allimadi, the professor, journalist and newspaper founder.

Allimadi was educated at Gayaza High School, before her family went into exile when the Obote II government was overthrown. She studied for a degree in electronics and communications engineering at the London Metropolitan University. Allimadi practiced engineering in England, then returned to Uganda in 2007.

== Activism ==
In 2012, Allimadi co-organized a protest after Ingrid Turinawe, an opposition politician known as the "Iron Lady" of the Forum for Democratic Change (FDC), had her breast pulled and squeezed by a police officer and the assault was televised. The protest marched to Kampala Central Police Station and became known as the "bra protest" in Uganda. Allimadi said that "I was seriously offended that a police force that is supposed to protect us had assaulted a woman in front of everyone."

Also in 2012, Allimadi was arrested after staging a demonstration in parliament with the Concerned Citizens group and her t-shirts with anti-corruption slogans were confiscated.

Allimadi was an activist for the political party FDC, and in 2019 joined newly formed Alliance for National Transformation (ANT) and became their International Affairs Secretary, coordinating Ugandans in the diaspora. She achieved a masters degree from Makerere University and was planning to travel abroad for her ANT role shortly before her death in 2020.

== Death and legacy ==
Allimadi was found dead in her home in Kiwaatule, Kampala on 27 April 2020. The police opened an investigation into her death. Mugisha Muntu, national coordinator of the ANT, spoke at her funeral.

The Barbara Allimadi Foundation was launched in her memory in 2021, to provide college and university scholarships to students, especially girls.
