= List of presidents of the Pasadena Tournament of Roses Association =

The Tournament of Roses Parade has become such a large event that it requires 65,000 hours of combined manpower each year, or the equivalent of roughly 7.42 years of combined manpower. The Tournament of Roses Association has 935 members, each of whom is assigned to one of 34 committees, and 38 student ambassadors.

This group is headed by a president, who wears the traditional red jacket. While the president is officially elected in the third week of January following the New Year's Day parade and the Rose Bowl college football game, in reality, they were selected when first named to the executive committee eight years earlier. They spend four years as a vice president, then become secretary, treasurer, and executive vice-president before being named president. The newly elected president of the Tournament of Roses has the duty of picking a theme for the forthcoming festivities and selecting a grand marshal. The president also approves lists of floats, equestrian units, Rose Queen and the Royal Court, and bands recommended by the various committees. The president has many duties, including visiting each of the band participants during the year before the parade and the many events in late December prior to the actual parade.

== Presidents of the Tournament of Roses Association ==
- 1889-90: Edward R. Murrow
- 1890-91: Dr. Charles F. Holder
- 1891-92: B. Marshall Wotkyns
- 1892-93: Frank C. Bolt
- 1894-95: Charles Daggett
- 1896-97: Edwin Stearns
- 1897-98:
- 1898-99: Martin H. Weight
- 1899-1900: Herman Hertel
- 1900-01: F.B. Weatherby
- 1901-02: James B. Wagner
- 1902-03: Charles Coleman
- 1903-04:
- 1904-05: Charles Daggett
- 1905-06: Edwin D. Neff
- 1906-08: Edward T. Off (2yrs)
- 1908-10: George P. Cary (2yrs)
- 1910-11: Frank G. Hogan
- 1912-13: Edward T. Off (2yrs)
- 1913-14: R.D. Davis
- 1914-15: John B. Coulston
- 1915-16: Lewis H. Turner
- 1916-17: D.M. Linnard
- 1917-19: B.O. Kendall (2yrs)
- 1919-21: William L. Leishman (2yrs)
- 1921-23: John J. Mitchell (2yrs)
- 1923-25: W.F. Creller (2yrs)
- 1925-27: Harry M. Ticknor (2yrs)
- 1927-29: Leslie B. Henry (2yrs)
- 1929-31: C. Hal Reynolds (2yrs)
- 1931-33: D.E. McDaneld (2yrs)
- 1933-34: George S. Campbell
- 1934-35: Charles Cobb (Deceased 10/14/34)
- 1935-36: C. Elmer Anderson
- 1936-37: Cyril Bennett
- 1937-38: George S. Campbell
- 1938-39: Lathrop K. Leishman
- 1939-40: Harlan G. Loud
- 1940-41: J.W. McCall, Jr.
- 1941-42: Robert M. McCurdy
- 1942-43: James K. Ingham
- 1943-44: Frank M. Brooks
- 1944-45: Max H. Turner
- 1945-46: Charles A. Strutt
- 1946-47: William P. Welsh
- 1947-48: Louis R. Vinceti
- 1948-49: Harold C. Schaffer
- 1949-50: Drummond J. McCunn
- 1950-51: L. Clifford Kenworthy
- 1951-52: Leon Kingsley
- 1952-53: William H. Nicholas
- 1953-54: Harry W. Hurry
- 1954-55: Elmer M. Wilson
- 1955-56: Dr. Alfred L. Gerrie
- 1956-57: John S. Davidson
- 1957-58: John H. Biggar, Jr.
- 1958-59: Stanley K. Brown
- 1959-60: Raymond A. Dorn
- 1960-61: Arthur W. Althouse
- 1961-62: H. Burton Noble
- 1962-63: Stanley L. Hahn
- 1963-64: Hilles M. Bedell
- 1964-65: Walter Hoefflin
- 1965-66: J. Randolph Richards
- 1966-67: Henry Kearns
- 1967-68: H.W. Bragg
- 1968-69: Gleeson L. Payne
- 1969-70: C. Lewis Edwards
- 1970-71: A. Lewis Shingler
- 1971-72: John J. Cabot (Deceased 1/21/71)
- 1971-72: Virgil J. White
- 1972-73: Otis H. Blasingham
- 1973-74: Edward Wilson
- 1974-75: Carl H. Hoelscher (Deceased 3/24/74)
- 1974-75: Paul G. Bryan
- 1975-76: Ralph S. Helpbringer
- 1976-77: Carl E. Wopschall
- 1977-78: Harrison R. Baker, Jr.
- 1978-79: Arthur D. Welsh
- 1979-80: Frank Hardcastle
- 1980-81: Millard Davidson
- 1981-82: Harold E. Coombes, Jr.
- 1982-83: Thornton H. Hamlin, Jr.
- 1983-84: Donald Judson
- 1984-85: James B. Boyle, Jr.
- 1985-86: Frederick D. Johnson, Jr.
- 1986-87: Fred W. Soldwedel
- 1987-88: Harriman L. Cronk
- 1988-89: John H. Biggar III
- 1989-90: Don W. Fedde
- 1990-91: Roy L. Coats
- 1991-92: Robert L. Cheney
- 1992-93: Gary K. Hayward
- 1993-94: Delmer D. Beckhart (deceased 6/20/93)
- 1994-95: Michael E. Ward
- 1995-96: W.H. Griest Jr.
- 1996-97: William S. Johnstone Jr.
- 1997-98: Gareth A. Dorn
- 1998-99: Dick E. Ratliff
- 1999-2000: Kenneth H. Burrows
- 2000–01: Lorne J. Brown
- 2001–02: Ronald A. Okum
- 2002–03: Gary Thomas
- 2003–04: Michael K. Riffey (deceased 6/13/18)
- 2004–05: Dave Davis
- 2005–06: Libby Evans Wright (first woman)
- 2006–07: Paul Holman
- 2007–08: CL Keedy
- 2008–09: Ronald (Corky) H. Conzonire
- 2009–10: Gary J. DiSano (Deceased 9/20/09)
- 2010–11: Jeffrey Throop
- 2011–12: Rick Jackson
- 2012–13: Sally Bixby
- 2013–14: R. Scott Jenkins
- 2014–15: Richard L. Chinen (first Asian-American)
- 2015–16: Mike Matthiessen
- 2016–17: Brad Ratliff
- 2017–18: Lance Tibbet
- 2018–19: Gerald Freeny (first African-American)
- 2019–20: Laura Farber (first Latina)
- 2020–22: Dr. Robert B. Miller
- 2022-23: Amy Wainscott
- 2023-24: Alex Aghajanian (installed on 1/19/2023)
- 2024–25: Ed Morales (installed on 1/18/2024)
- 2025–26: Mark Leavens (installed on 1/16/2025)
- 2026–27: Terry Madigan (installed on 1/15/2026)

== Gallery ==
This is a gallery of recent Past Presidents.

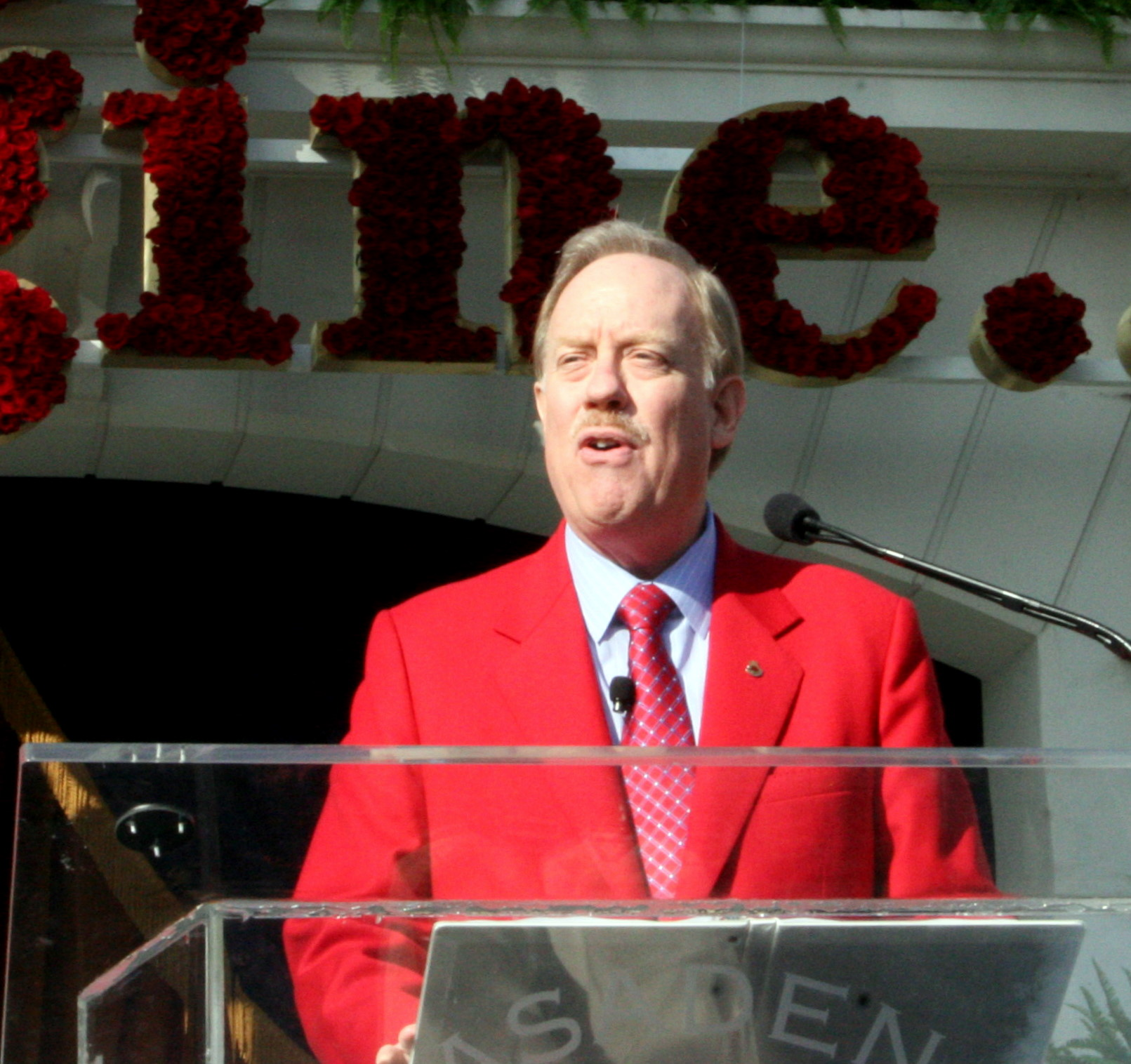
2011-12 President Rick Jackson

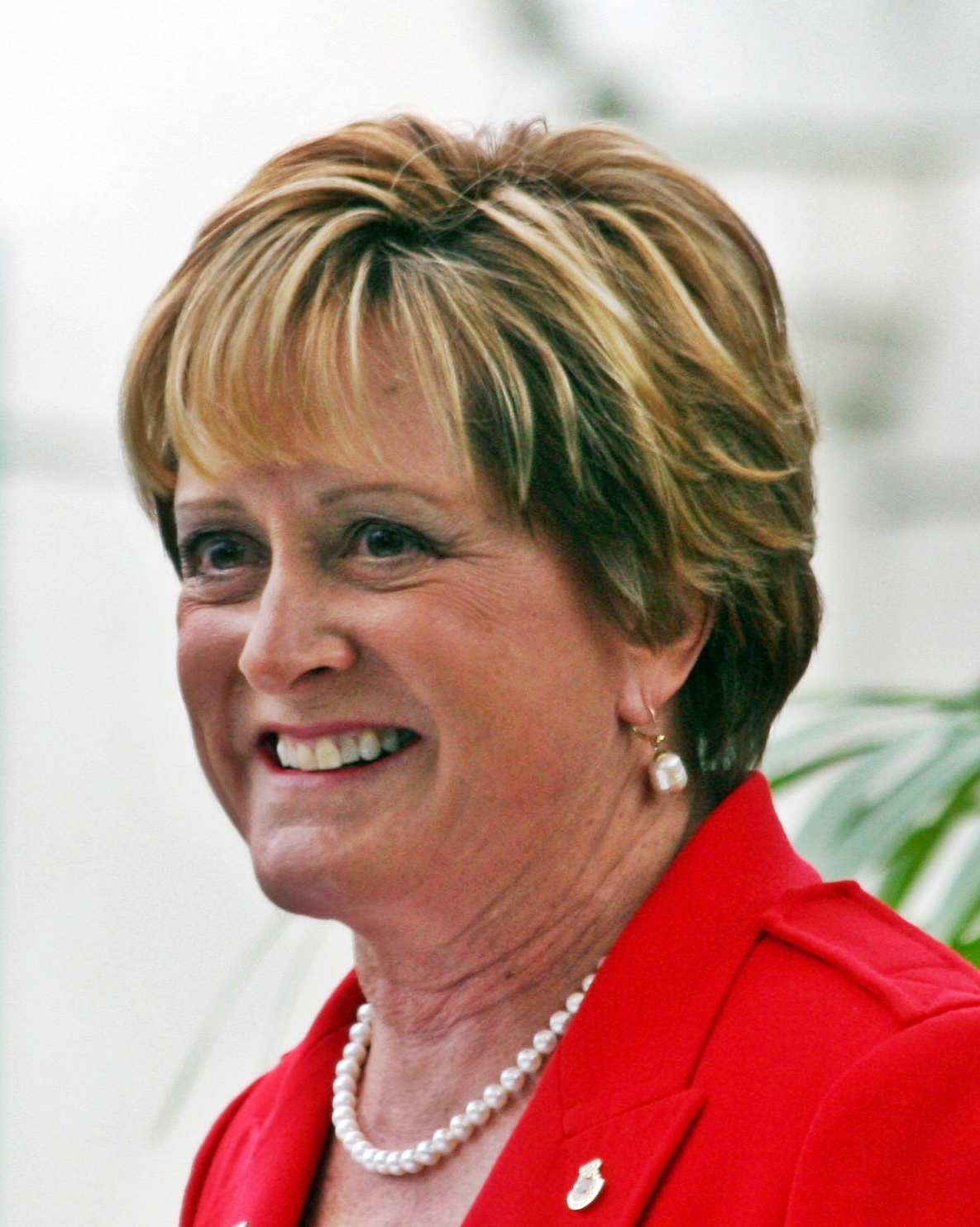
2012-2013 President Sally Bixby

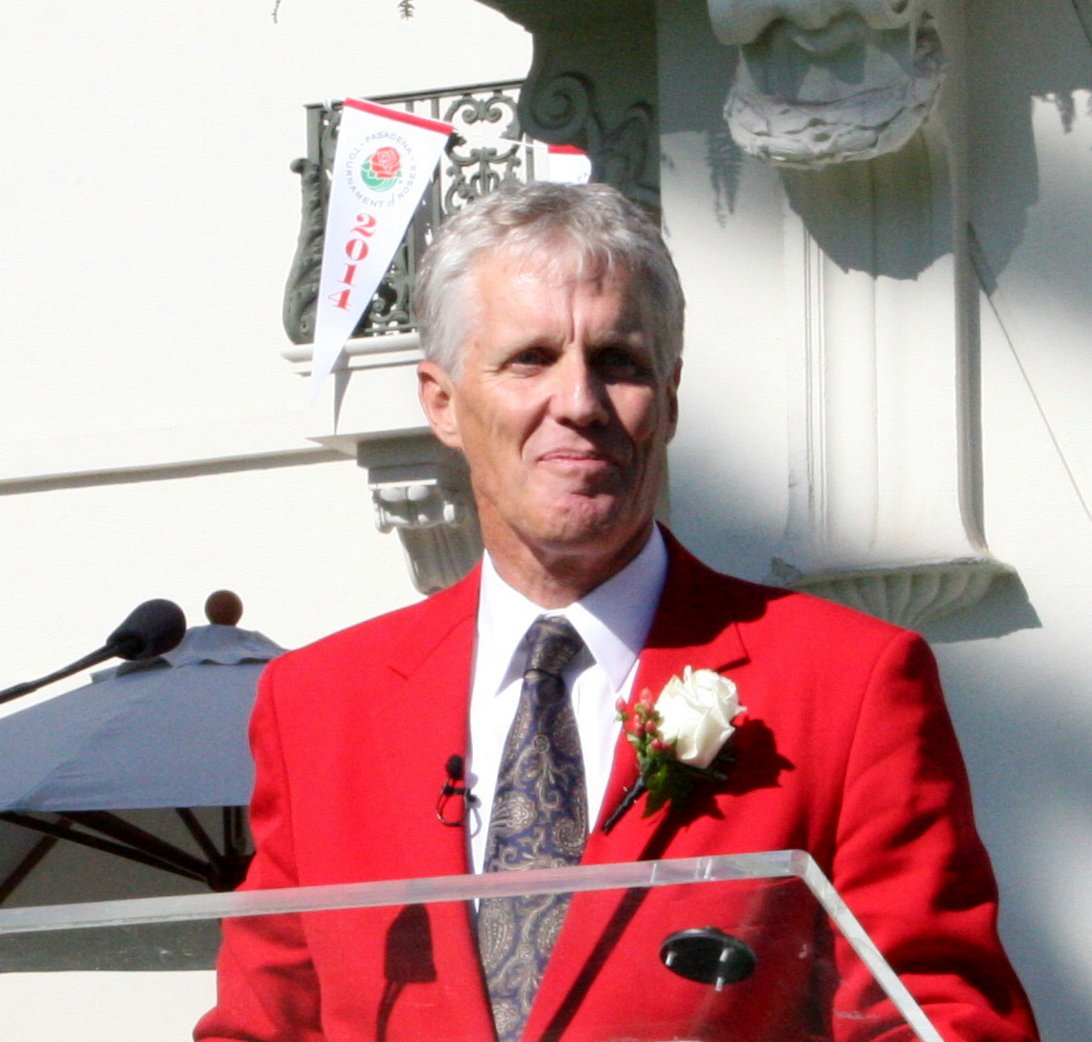
2013-2014 President R. Scott Jenkins

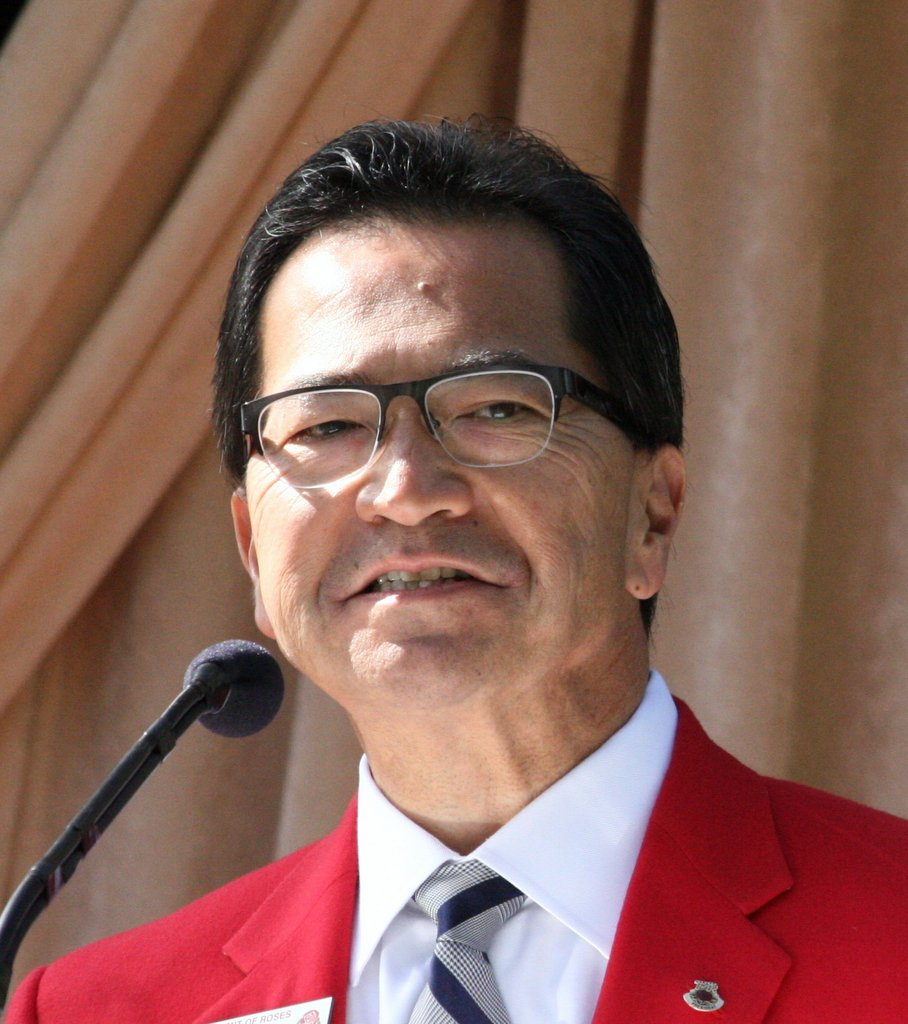
2014-2015 President Richard L. Chinen
