= Valerian Gribayedoff =

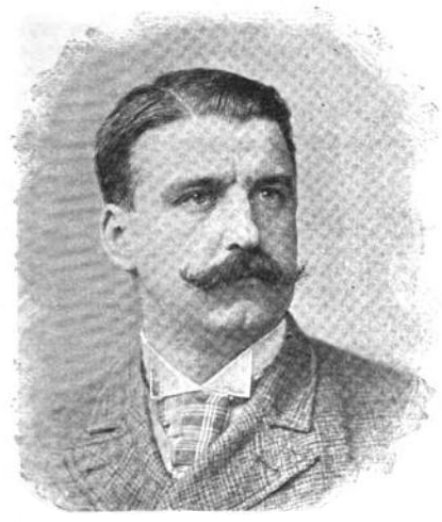
- Gribayedoff c. 1892
- Born: 1858; Kronstadt, Russia
- Died: 1908 (aged 50); Lausanne, Switzerland
- Occupations: Journalist, illustrator

Valerian Michaelovich Gribayedoff (Russian: Валериан Михайлович Грибоедов) (1858–1908) was a Russian journalist and illustrator. He is most famous for introducing illustrated drawings into newspapers and capturing some of the only photos during the trial for the Dreyfus Affair in 1897. He was born in Kronstadt, Russia in 1858, and many believed him to have been of noble birth, possibly related to Alexander Griboyedov. Educated in St. Petersburg, England, France, and Germany, he came later to America working as a journalist, rising to prominence by recreating drawings from photos to be included in the newspapers that were more lifelike than any others in the field. His only book, The French Invasion of Ireland in '98, was published in 1890. In 1897 he left the United States for Paris, covering the Dreyfus Affair. His last work for an American newspaper was covering the Russo-Japanese War as a correspondent in Siberia. He died in Lausanne, Switzerland in 1908.

== Works ==
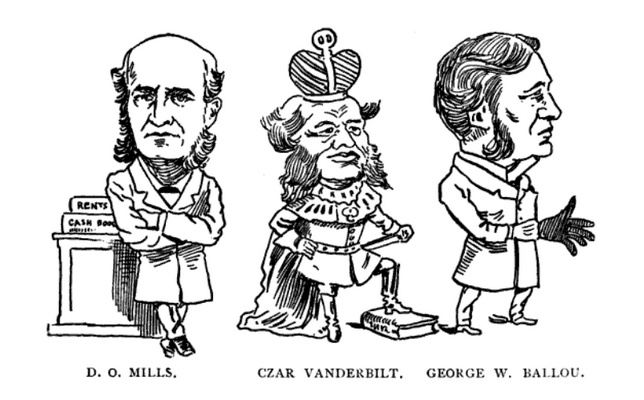
1884 cartoon from New York World; one of the first Sunday illustrations

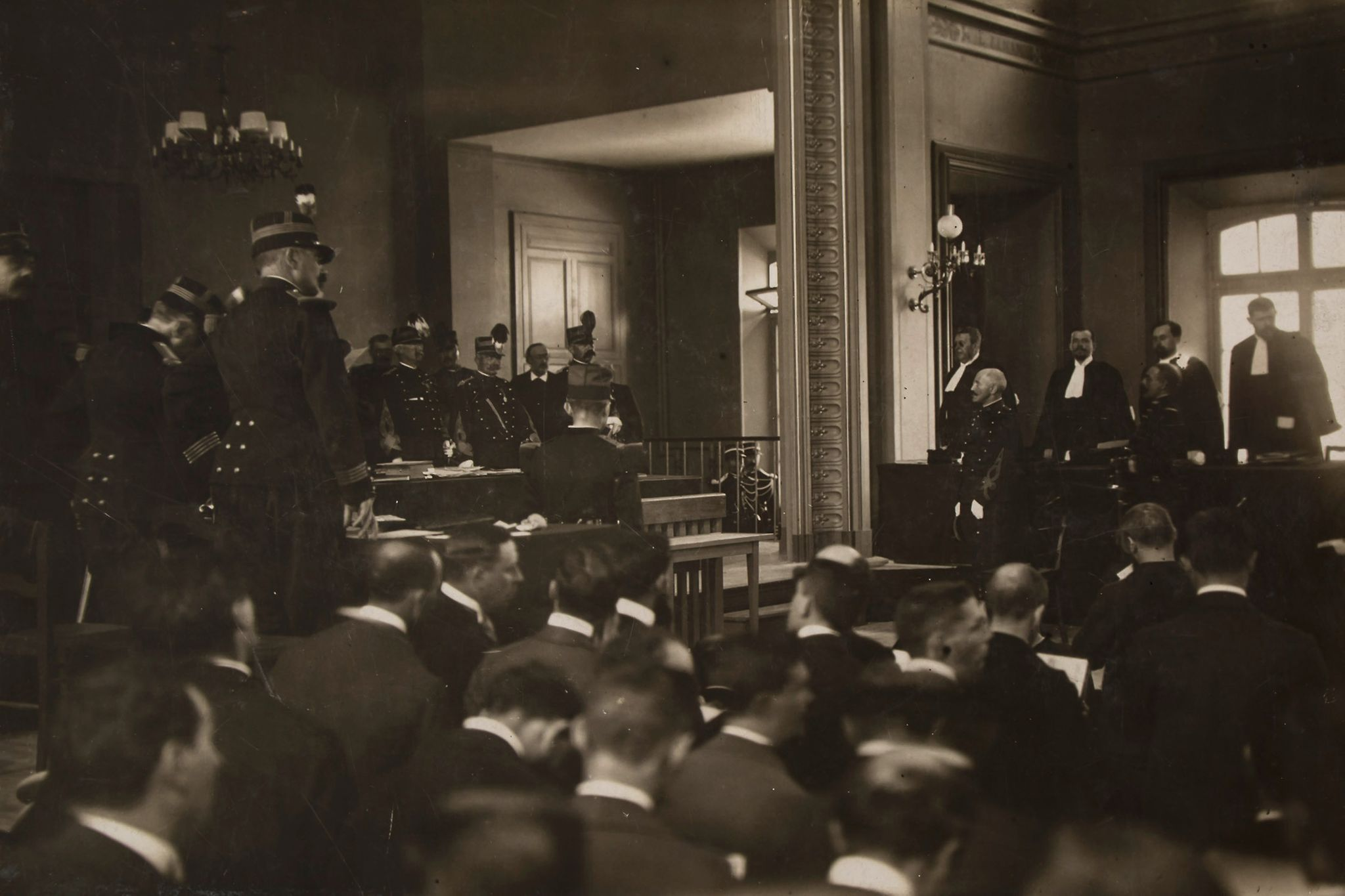
1899 courtroom photo from the Dreyfus affair at Rennes

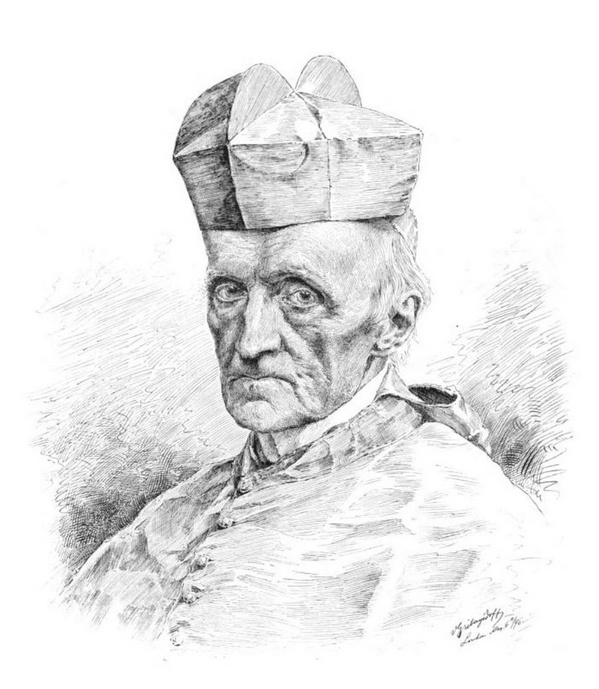
Illustration of Cardinal Henry Edward Manning

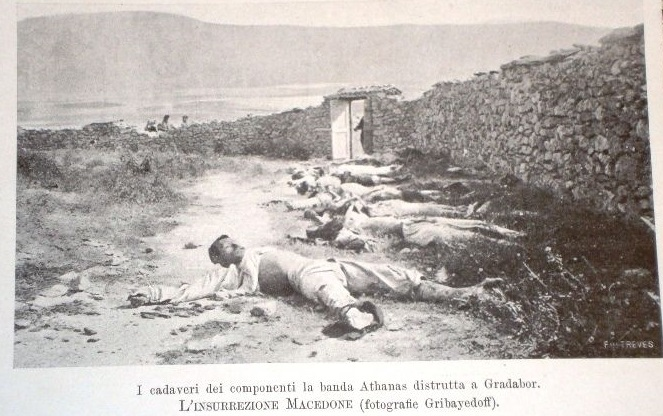
Dead bodies of the detachment of Atanas Gradoborliyata in Gradobor on 24 May 1903
