= The Hearts of Darkness =

2003 book by Milton Allimadi

The Hearts of Darkness: How White Writers Created the Racist Image of Africa
- Author: Milton Allimadi
- Language: English
- Genre: Social science
- Publisher: Black Star Books
- Publication date: February 1, 2003
- Publication place: USA
- Pages: 96
- ISBN: 978-0974003900

The Hearts of Darkness: How White Writers Created the Racist Image of Africa is a 2003 non-fiction book by Milton Allimadi.

The book documents how western writers and publishers have pushed stereotypical and racist images of Africans and African nations.

== Publication ==
The book was first published in 2003 and a second 2016 edition added content about the role of NATO in the Second Libyan Civil War.

== Synopsis ==
The short book documents racism in the writing of authors, explorers, and aristocrats Samuel Baker, Joseph Conrad, Frederick Lugard, Charles Gordon, Keith Richburg, and Henry Morton Stanley.

The author reports on his conversations with retired editors of The New York Times, National Geographic, and Time magazine.

It documents racial stereotypes in both print and online media. Specifically, it documents and critiques the widespread depictions, most by white writers, but also by Black writers, of barbarism, physical, moral and intellectual inferiority, denial of the positive contributions that Black people have made to culture, arts, science, and descriptions of Africa as inhospitable and uncivilized.

== Critical reception ==
Francis Kwarteng, writing in ModernGhana said that Allimadi "should be highly commended for a job well executed."

University of Maryland Eastern Shore's Professor Kathryn Barrett-Gaines praised the book for its brevity and stated it would be the first book that her students of history would be required to read.

Molefi Kete Asante described the book as profound, enlightening, and perceptive.

== Impact ==
The book was used to inform various academic papers and publications:

- Ojo, Tokunbo. "Africa in the Canadian media: The Globe and Mail's coverage of Africa from 2003 to 2012." Ecquid Novi: African Journalism Studies 35.1 (2014): 43–57.
- MacCann, Donnarae. "The sturdy fabric of cultural imperialism: Tracing its patterns in contemporary children's novels." Children's Literature 33.1 (2005): 185–208.

== See also ==
- Heart of Darkness – 1899 novella by Joseph Conrad
- 2021 Book by Milton Allimadi Manufacturing Hate - How Africa Was Demonized in Western Media
