= Ingrid Turinawe =

Ugandan politician

- Born: Ingrid Kamateneti; 23 November 1973 (age 52); Kanungu, Uganda
- Citizenship: Uganda
- Education: Nkumba University (Bachelor of Public Administration and Management); National Teachers’ College Kabale (Diploma in Education)
- Occupation: Politician
- Years active: 1998–present
- Known for: Politics
- Spouse: Jackson Turinawe

Ingrid Kamateneti Turinawe (born 23 November 1973), commonly known as Ingrid Turinawe, is a female politician who serves as the Chairperson of the Women's League in the opposition Forum for Democratic Change (FDC) political party in Uganda. She also serves as the National Political Mobilizer for the FDC political party.

== Early life and education ==
Ingrid was born on 23 November 1973 to Jane Bakesiga and the late Stanley Bakwatilenda (died 1982), in Kashojwa Village, Rugyeyo sub-county, in present-day Kanungu District, before it was split from Rukungiri District. She was the fourth-born of her mother's nine children, five boys and four girls.

She attended "Rugyeyo Primary School" for he elementary schooling and she studied at "Kinyasano Girls High School" for both her O-Level and A-Level education. Later, she obtained a Diploma in Education from the National Teachers' College, Kabale, in Kabale town. Still later, she graduated from Nkumba University with a Bachelor of Public Administration and Management degree.

== Career ==
During her long vacation after high school in 1992, Ingrid married Jackson Turinawe, a successful businessman in Rukungiri town. After her diploma studies in Kabale, Ingrid taught for one year and then joined her husband in business, helping to run their pharmacy in Rukungiri town. In 1998, she was elected to the Rukungiri District Council, representing Buhunga sub-county and Ruhinda sub-county.

In 2001, Turinawe was re-elected to the district council. In 2003, Kanungu District was split off Rukungiri District. One year later, Ingrid Turinawe became Speaker of Rukungiri District, when the former speaker, George Owakiroru, was arrested for alleged terrorist activity. She served in that role until 2006. She became a founding member of the FDC political party in 2005.

In 2005, Ingrid separated from Jackson Turinawe, her husband of 13 years, but did not get a formal divorce. She relocated to Kampala, the capital and largest city in Uganda. In 2006, she contested the Rukungiri District Women's Constituency parliamentary seat, and again in 2011, losing both times.

== Controversies ==
On 20 April 2012, Turinawe was driving to Nansana, a suburb of Kampala, to attend a political rally, when police intercepted her and a scuffle ensued, during which, a policeman forcefully grabbed her left breast. She sued the Uganda Police Force and Uganda Attorney General, for pain, suffering and general embarrassment, demanding USh560 million (approx. US$160,000), as compensatory damages. Protests were organised by human rights activist Barbara Allimadi. The Ugandan government publicly apologized to Turinawe and the case was settled out of court.

In February 2017, Turinawe contested one of the seats to the East African Legislative Assembly, which convenes in Arusha, Tanzania. The legislators to that body are elected by the respective parliaments of the member states of the East African Community. She encountered a very hostile reception in the parliamentary chamber, when she went to declare her candidacy, due to her frosty relationships with the Ugandan MPs, the majority of whom belong to the ruling National Resistance Movement political party. When the actual voting took place on 28 February 2017, she received a paltry 25 votes out of a possible maximum of 398 votes.

== Other considerations ==
Turinawe and her estranged husband Jackson Turinawe are the parents of five children, three girls and two boys. In March 2017, The Ugandan Magazine listed Ingrid Turinawe among the "10 Most Powerful Women in Ugandan Politics in 2017.

== See also ==
- Winnie Kiiza
- Angelline Osegge
- Nabilah Naggayi Sempala
- Anna Ebaju Adeke
