= The Holding =

The Holding may refer to:

- The Holding (film), a 2011 British thriller film
- The Holding (Fear the Walking Dead), an episode of the television series Fear the Walking Dead

== See also ==
- Holding (disambiguation)
