= Atanas Gradoborliyata =

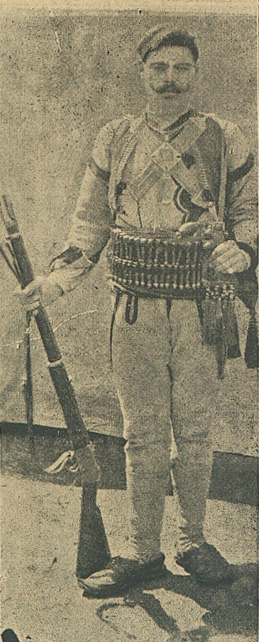
- Born: 1860; Gradobor, today Greece
- Died: 1903 (aged 42–43); Gradobor, today Greece
- Organization: IMARO

Atanas Gradoborliyata (Bulgarian: Атанас Градоборлията, Macedonian: Атанас Градоборлијата; 1860 - 24 May 1903) was a Macedonian Bulgarian revolutionary, a worker of the Internal Macedonian-Adrianople Revolutionary Organization (IMARO).

Atanas Gradoborliyata was born in the Bulgarian majority village of Gradobor (now Pentalofos, Kallithea municipality, Thessaloniki regional unit), in the Salonika Vilayet of the Ottoman Empire. Together with Ivancho Karasuliyata, Iliya Karchovaliyata, Apostol Petkov and others, he was among the old workers of the revolutionary organization on which Gotse Delchev relied in the first years of IMARO's consolidation. As a leader of a revolutionary band, Atanas Gradoborliyata and all his freedom fighters died in 1903 near the village of Gradobor, poisoned by (sic) Grecomans.
