= Tuna Club of Avalon =

- U.S. National Register of Historic Places
- California Historical Landmark
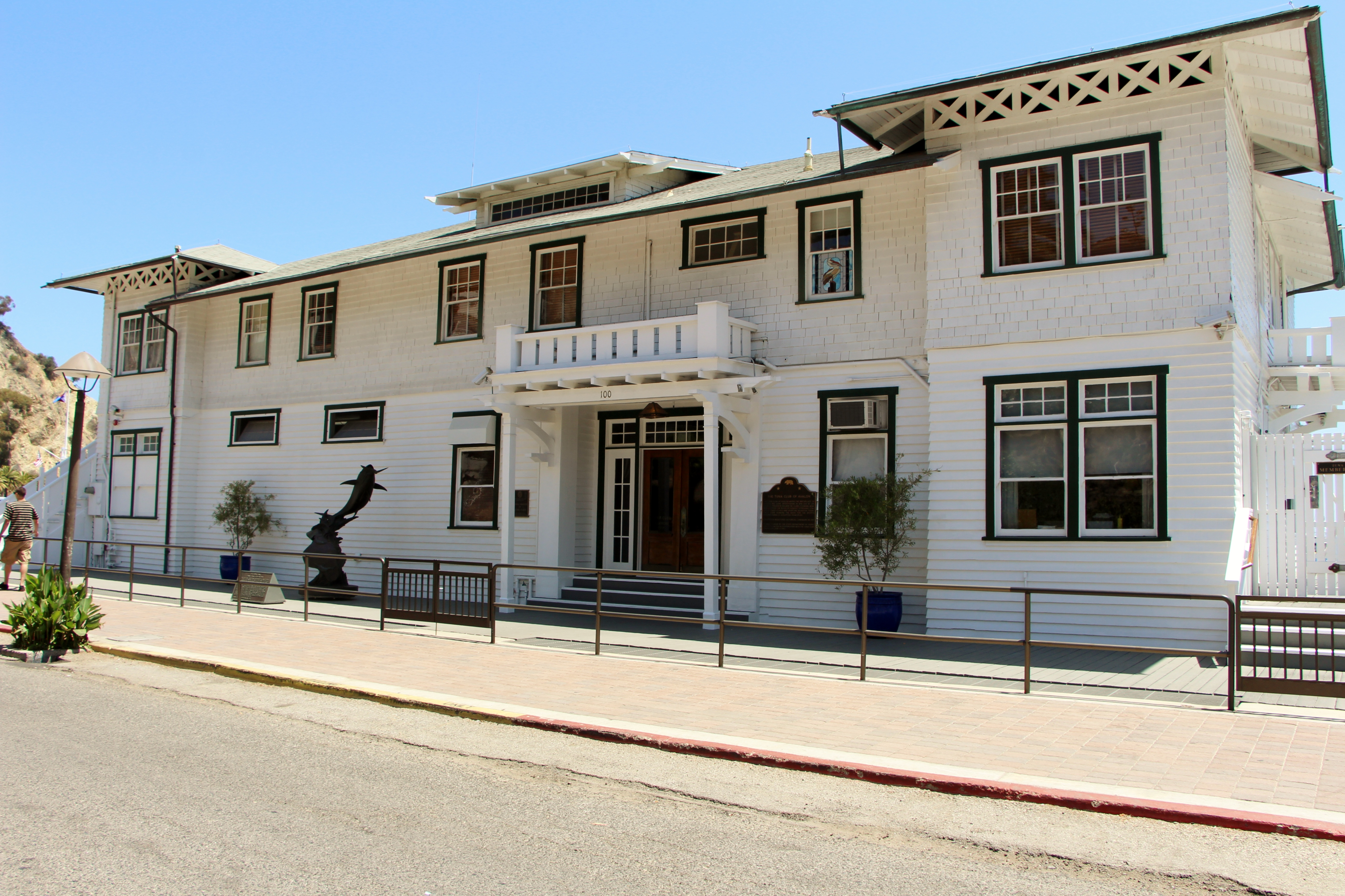
- Main entrance

- Location within the Los Angeles metropolitan area Location within California Location within the United States
- Location: 100 St. Catherine Way, Catalina Island, Avalon, California
- Coordinates: 33°20′44″N 118°19′35″W
- Area: less than one acre
- Built: 1916
- Architectural style: Bungalow/craftsman
- NRHP reference No.: 91000338
- CHISL No.: 997

Significant dates
- Added to NRHP: April 2, 1991
- Designated CHISL: Feb. 11, 1991

The Tuna Club of Avalon is a private members's club in Avalon on Santa Catalina Island in California.

== History ==
The club was founded by Charles Frederick Holder (1851–1915) in 1898.

Early members included Zane Grey, Bing Crosby, Charlie Chaplin, Stan Laurel, Hal Roach, Cecil B. DeMille, Herbert Hoover and George S. Patton. Among the first honorary members were Theodore Roosevelt, then Governor of New York, and author Henry Van Dyke (both elected in 1898); Henry Markham (elected in 1899); ex-President Grover Cleveland (1899); Gifford Pinchot (1906); and Charles Hallock (1907). Against widespread opinion and popular belief, the future prime minister Winston Churchill was not part of the membership. The club hosted Churchill once, for a unique visit in 1929. On that occasion, the then-Chancellor of the Exchequer caught a 125-pound marlin.

The club was all-male for many years, but membership to women is now welcome.

Beyond its listed clubhouse, it also leases waterfront facilities.

== Clubhouse ==
The clubhouse is located at 100 St. Catherine Way in Avalon on Santa Catalina Island in California. It is listed on the National Register of Historic Places since April 2, 1991. It is also listed as a California Historical Landmark.

The state marker on the site reads:

- NO. 997 TUNA CLUB OF AVALON – The Tuna Club of Avalon marks the birthplace of modern big game sportfishing in 1898. Led by Dr. Charles Frederick Holder, the club's founding members adopted the rules of conduct stressing conservationist ethics and sporting behavior. Today, their work remains the basis for the sport's internationally accepted principles.

The clubhouse was used as a location for the 1974 film Chinatown. In the film, the Tuna Club was renamed the Albacore Club.

== Bibliography ==
- Farrior, Michael (2004). The History of the Tuna Club, 1898–1998. Avalon, Santa Catalina Island, CA: Tuna Club Foundation. OCLC 54039547.
