= Young Peak =

Mountain in Antarctica

There is also a group of features in Antarctica called the Young Peaks.

Young Peak (69°45′S 74°31′E) is a low peak near the Antarctic coast, standing just south of Holder Peak and 2 miles (3.2 km) east of Mount Caroline Mikkelsen. First plotted from air photos taken by the Lars Christensen Expedition, 1936–37, and with Holder Peak called "Tvillingfjell" (twin mountain) by Norwegian cartographers. This peak was named by Antarctic Names Committee of Australia (ANCA) for W. Young, officer in charge at Davis Station, 1963, who led an ANARE (Australian National Antarctic Research Expeditions) party that surveyed this area.
