= Manufacturing Hate =

2021 book by Milton Allimadi

Manufacturing Hate: How Africa Was Demonized in Western Media
- Author: Milton Allimadi
- Language: English
- Genre: Social science
- Published: June 2021
- Publisher: Kendall Hunt Publishing Company
- Publication place: US
- ISBN: 978-1792466472

Manufacturing Hate - How Africa Was Demonized in Western Media is a 2021 non-fiction book by Milton Allimadi.

The book documents the dehumanizing and racist writing by European and American authors and explorers and how they have been used to justify the colonization of Africa.

== Synopsis ==
The book documents how writing that dehumanizes Africans and African countries is not accidental but a deliberate effort to justify the theft of resources and violent colonization of Black people.

It covers over 2,000 years of writing, starting with Herodotus's writing circa 450 BC noting the constant fascination of Europeans with black skin colour. The majority of the book focusses on European and US colonial activities in the 19th and 20th centuries. It documents the self-promotional motivations of European travellers to Africa and their efforts to justify colonization. It notes the European surprise at Ethiopian forces winning the Battle of Adwa. The book focuses on narratives from The New York Times and its role in perpetuating racist coverage.

The Albert N’Yanza Great Basin of the Nile (1866) by Samuel Baker and Heart of Darkness (1899) by Joseph Conrad are singled out for their negative characterization of Africans as "savages" which in turn were used to justify colonization.

== Critical reception ==
Randall Robinson praised the book for providing the evidence about the unkindness of western reporting about Africa.

New Age described it as "excellent, well-written, concise".

== See also ==
- The Hearts of Darkness: How White Writers Created the Racist Image of Africa
