= Hölder =

Hölder:

- Hölder, Hoelder as surname
- Hölder condition
- Hölder's inequality
- Hölder mean
- Jordan–Hölder theorem
