= USS Holder (DD-819) =

Gearing-class destroyer

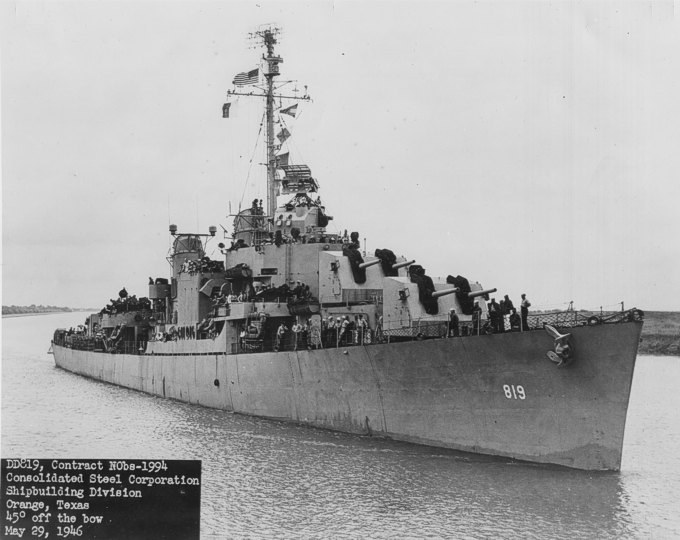
- USS Holder

History

United States
- Name: USS Holder
- Namesake: Randolph M. Holder
- Builder: Consolidated Steel Corporation, Orange, Texas
- Laid down: 23 April 1945
- Launched: 25 August 1945
- Commissioned: 18 May 1946
- Decommissioned: 1 October 1976
- Reclassified: DDE-819, 4 March 1950; DD-819, 7 August 1962
- Stricken: 1 October 1976
- Identification: Callsign: NAYG; Hull number: DD-819
- Fate: Transferred to Ecuador, 23 February 1977

History

Ecuador
- Name: BAE Presidente Eloy Alfaro
- Namesake: Eloy Alfaro
- Acquired: 23 February 1977
- Stricken: 1991
- Fate: Broken up for scrap, 1991

General characteristics
- Class & type: Gearing-class destroyer
- Displacement: 3,460 long tons (3,516 t) full
- Length: 390 ft 6 in (119.02 m)
- Beam: 40 ft 10 in (12.45 m)
- Draft: 14 ft 4 in (4.37 m)
- Propulsion: Geared turbines, 2 shafts, 60,000 shp (45 MW)
- Speed: 35 knots (65 km/h; 40 mph)
- Range: 4,500 nmi (8,300 km) at 20 kn (37 km/h; 23 mph)
- Complement: 336
- Armament: 6 × 5"/38 caliber guns; 12 × 40 mm AA guns; 11 × 20 mm AA guns; 10 × 21 inch (533 mm) torpedo tubes; 6 × depth charge projectors; 2 × depth charge tracks

USS Holder (DD/DDE-819) was a Gearing-class destroyer of the United States Navy, the second Navy ship named for Lieutenant (jg) Randolph Mitchell Holder, a Navy pilot who was killed during the Battle of Midway.

Holder was launched by Consolidated Steel Corp., Orange, Texas, on 25 August 1945; sponsored by Mrs. Annette Holder, mother of Lieutenant (j.g.) Holder; and commissioned on 18 May 1946 at Orange, Texas, Comdr. Barry K. Atkins in command.

== Service history ==
=== 1946–1962 ===
Holder conducted her shakedown training in the Caribbean and returned to Norfolk, Virginia on 28 August 1946. After a period of training exercises along the coast, she sailed for the Mediterranean on 23 October. During the subsequent operations with the 6th Fleet in this area, Holder visited Egypt and Saudi Arabia, arriving Newport on 22 March 1947. She then took part in anti-submarine training exercises out of Newport and in the Caribbean.

The destroyer continued this pattern of operations for the years that followed. In June–July 1949 Holder took part in a midshipman training cruise to northern Europe and upon her return moved her home port from Newport to Norfolk. Her classification was changed to DDE-819 on 4 March 1950, but she continued to alternate cruises to Europe and the Mediterranean with periods of training and upkeep out of Norfolk and the Caribbean. When the Suez Crisis flared in the Middle East over Egypt's seizure of the Suez Canal in 1956, Holder steamed to join the 6th Fleet in operations. Again in 1958 Holder sailed to the Mediterranean in March and in July took part in the landings at Beirut, Lebanon.

=== 1962–1968 ===
The veteran destroyer, reclassified DD-819 again on 7 August 1962, took part in another graphic demonstration of the importance of sea power, this time in the Western Hemisphere. During the Cuban Missile Crisis, when the introduction of offensive missiles into Cuba forced President Kennedy to proclaim a naval quarantine of that island, Holder and other ships took up station so as to intercept and inspect shipping. The destroyer made an inspection of a Russian ship leaving Cuba on 8 November and remained on this duty until 21 November, when she steamed to Norfolk.

Holder entered Norfolk Naval Shipyard on 17 December 1962 for Fleet Rehabilitation and Modernization Overhaul, a major repair and modernization job which added years to her useful life. New weapons, including ASROC and QH-50 DASH, and a helicopter hangar and flight deck increased the ship's anti-submarine capability. Emerging in October 1963, the ship conducted shakedown training before returning to the Caribbean for maneuvers.

Holder devoted 1964 and 1965 to ASW training. From 12 January to 4 February 1965 she participated in the recovery of NASA's unmanned Gemini 2 capsule. Between 26 April and 17 May, Holder patrolled the Dominican Republic's coast during the struggle to prevent a Communist takeover of that island nation. She spent the next year on duty in the Atlantic.

On 6 June 1966 Holder sailed through the Panama Canal on her way to the Pacific Fleet. From 15 to 28 July she was plane guard ship for aircraft carrier Ranger (CVA-61) in Gulf of Tonkin. She then conducted naval gunfire support off Vietnam from 29 July to 8 August. In October Holder was plane guard for Intrepid (CVS-11), and also she acted in support of the heavy cruiser Chicago (CG-11). Sailing for home on 10 November via the Suez Canal, Holder arrived in Norfolk on 17 December to prepare for future action.

In 1968 "Holder" was part of the Standing Naval Force Atlantic (STANAVFORLANT), the NATO high readiness force for the Atlantic Ocean.

[Add ship's history from 1967 until 1976]

=== Transfer to Ecuador ===
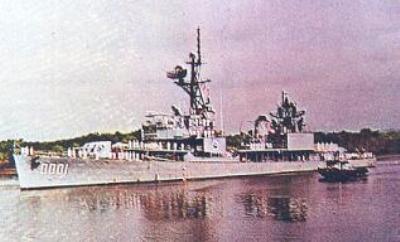
Presidente Elroy Alfaro in Ecuadorian service.

The Holder was struck from the Naval Vessel Register on 1 October 1976. The ship was then transferred to Ecuador on 23 February 1977 and renamed Presidente Eloy Alfaro. Presidente Eloy Alfaro was stricken and broken up for scrap in 1991.
