= Burton Allen Holder =

- Born: 1843; Polk County, Missouri
- Died: 1920 (aged 76–77); Grayson County, Texas
- Military career
- Allegiance: Confederate States of America
- Branch: Confederate States Army
- Service years: 1864–65
- Conflicts: American Civil War: Red River Campaign

Burton Allen Holder (born between January 16 and March 16, 1843 – 1920) gained fame as a soldier in the Confederate States Army during the American Civil War. During the Red River Campaign, Holder led the 22nd Texas Cavalry Regiment [Dismounted] which kept Union forces out of the Red River and new areas of Texas for the rest of the war.

Holder's parents Isaac Bledsoe Holder (b. December 20, 1783, died 1862) and Elizabeth Ann Stewart (born about 1793) were raised on the Chickasaw Reservation in Alabama. In the 1820s, they and the rest of the "Bleacher" clan moved to southwestern Missouri where the family lived for the next twenty years. Burton A. Holder was born in Polk County, Missouri, sometime in the first three months of 1843. In the 1850s, the family moved to the Indian Territory and then to Grayson County, Texas, where Holder was living when the Civil War erupted in 1861.

On April 25, 1862, Holder married Nellie Campbell, a 20-year-woman who had been born in North Carolina. They raised several children.

Holder enlisted in the Confederate Armed forces. By the Red River Campaign in 1864, he was in command of the 22nd Texas Cavalry Regiment [Dismounted].

Holder's wife died at their home in Denison, Texas, in 1890 and Holder died thirty years later. They are buried in Grayson County.
