= Preeti Chauhan =

- Education: B.S in Psychology and B.A in Criminology University of Florida M.A in Clinical Psychology from University of Virginia Ph.D In Clinical Psychology from the University of Virginia
- Occupations: Professor and Researcher
- Known for: Professor at John Jay College of Criminal Justice and the Graduate Center, City University of New York and She is also co-founder and the former director of the Data Collaborative for Justice (DCJ).

Preeti Chauhan is a Distinguished Faculty Fellow for Research and Professor of Psychology at John Jay College of Criminal Justice and the CUNY Graduate Center. Her research focuses on juvenile and criminal justice systems, with a particular emphasis on pretrial detention and lower-level enforcement, such as misdemeanors. Chauhan co-founded the Data Collaborative for Justice at John Jay College, where her research has impacted policy changes throughout New York and other states.

== Education ==
From 1996 to 2000, Chauhan studied at the University of Florida, where she completed bachelor's degrees in Criminology and Psychology. In 2002, she began her Masters of Arts in Clinical Psychology, and graduated with Master of Arts in Clinical Psychology at the University of Virginia in 2005. Chauhan then went on to earn her Ph.D. in Clinical Psychology from the University of Virginia beginning in 2005 and completing it in 2009.

Before obtaining her Ph.D. in 2009, Chauhan completed her pre-doctoral clinical internship at the New York-Presbyterian Hospital, Weill Cornell Medical Center from 2008 to 2009. Her dissertation, "Female Juvenile Offenders: Differentiating Mechanisms of Antisocial Behavior by Neighborhood Disadvantage and Race," aimed to identify the ways in which local circumstances and race affect antisocial behavior in female juvenile offenders. Her study investigated whether antisocial behavior in the juvenile justice system is driven by different processes for Black and white females. She received guidance for her dissertation from Dick Reppucci of the University of Virginia.

== Professional career ==
Chauhan joined the John Jay College of Criminal Justice as an assistant professor at John Jay in 2009. She was promoted to associate professor in 2016 and full professor in 2021.

To contribute data to policy discussions about the front end of the justice system, Chauhan co-founded the Data Collaborative for Justice (DCJ) at John Jay College in 2013. Her leadership allowed DCJ's research, which concentrated on pre-trial detention, lower-level enforcement, and other important areas, to influence criminal justice changes. Until 2021, she was the executive director of DCJ. Many policy decisions in New York State, New York City, and other US jurisdictions have been influenced by the research conducted for this project. Chauhan has contributed to the creation of three special issues for scholarly publications, Criminal Justice Policy Review, Journal of Community Psychology, and Criminology, Criminal Justice, Law and Society, that focus on lower-level enforcement. To ensure that the research she completes is seen by a wider audience, she also actively collaborates with professionals in the field of criminal justice through newsletters and trade associations like the National Association of State Judicial Educators, the International Association of Chiefs of Police, the American Prosecutors Association, and the National Association for Public Defense.

Chauhan's research is focused on the intricacies between factors such as but not limited to racial and ethnic disparities in antisocial conduct, law, neighborhood context, timing of incarceration. Her work in academia and with DCJ has influenced policy talks and criminal justice changes in a real way. Chauhan is on the editorial boards of numerous academic journals, including Law and Human Behavior, Psychology, Public Policy and the Law, Psychology of Violence, and the Journal of Community Psychology, in addition to her leadership positions. She has served on a number of advisory committees, such as the Council on Criminal Justice, the New York City Criminal Justice Agency, and the Committee on Law and Justice (CLAJ) of the National Academy of Sciences. She also participated in the ThriveNYC Science Advisory Group and helped with the assessment of the Los Angeles Police Department's Community Safety Partnership.

== Research ==
Chauhan focuses on racial disparities, police-community relations, mental health interventions, and pretrial detention in her research, which spans the fields of criminology, forensic psychology, and public policy. She investigates systemic elements, such as the neighborhood setting and the procedures of the legal system, affect social outcomes and disparities.

Chauhan has done research on how pretrial incarceration affects the outcome of court cases. Additionally, she examines the factors that predict readmission after imprisonment, providing information for policy changes aimed at reducing unnecessary incarceration.

Chauhan investigates the interactions between police enforcement and individuals experiencing mental health crises in partnership with public safety organizations. She researches emergency detention procedures and police referrals to mental health providers, especially in high-stress metropolitan settings. She has also assessed the efficacy of correctional officers' mental health training programs, identifying weaknesses and suggesting enhancements.

Chauhan's research also extends to substance abuse, neighborhood attainment, and adult mental health to childhood maltreatment. Her work examines patterns in crime reporting and police-community trust. amount various racial and immigrant groups. Her research offers policy suggestions for enhancing ties between the police and the community, especially in multicultural cities. Chauhan also participates in studies on prosecutorial reform, exploring initiatives to lower incarceration rates while preserving prosecutorial discretion. Her research supports evidence-based changes that balance reducing harm to communities with ensuring public safety.

== Awards and honors ==
- Payne Whitney Faculty Council Award for Outstanding Research from Weill Cornell Medical Center at New York Presbyterian Hospital (2009)
- Donal E.J. MacNamara Junior Faculty Award from John Jay College of Criminal Justice, CUNY, in recognition of early-career excellence in teaching and research (2012)
- Scholarly Excellence Award from John Jay College of Criminal Justice, CUNY, in recognition of significant research contributions (2015)
- TriBeCa Disruptor Foundation Fellow designation for innovative work in the field of criminal justice (2016)
- Feliks Gross Endowment Award, given to CUNY professors in the Humanities and Sciences in recognition of outstanding academic accomplishments (2016)
