= Randolph M. Holder =

Randolph Mitchell Holder
- Born: September 20, 1918; Jackson, Mississippi
- Died: June 5, 1942 (aged 23); Midway Atoll
- Military career
- Allegiance: United States of America
- Branch: United States Navy
- Service years: 1940–1942
- Rank: Lieutenant (j.g.)
- Unit: Torpedo Squadron 6 (VT-6)
- Conflicts: World War II; *Battle of Midway
- Awards: Navy Cross (posthumous)

Randolph Mitchell Holder (born September 20, 1918 in Jackson, Mississippi; died c. June 5, 1942), was a United States Navy officer who was killed in the Battle of Midway and posthumously awarded the Navy Cross.

Holder was commissioned as an Ensign April 10, 1940 following flight training. Reporting to Torpedo Squadron 6 (VT-6) on the famous aircraft carrier USS Enterprise (CV-6), he took part in the early carrier operations in the critical months following the attack on Pearl Harbor and then fought in the pivotal Battle of Midway, the first of the great American successes in the naval war against the Empire of Japan. In the gallant but futile attack of the torpedo planes early on June 4, 1942, Holder and his comrades attacked the Japanese ships without fighter cover. Though Holder and many others were shot down while pressing this attack, they forced radical maneuvers and diverted the Japanese air cover so as to make later raids lethal to the enemy fleet. Lieutenant (j.g.) Holder never returned to the Enterprise, and was presumed dead the next day, June 5, 1942. He was awarded the Navy Cross posthumously for his heroism.

== Namesake ==
In 1944, the destroyer escort USS Holder (DE-401) was named in his honor; after DE-401's loss, the destroyer USS Holder (DD-819) received a similar honor in 1945.
