= Hodler =

Hodler may refer to:

- Ferdinand Hodler (1853–1918), Swiss painter
  - 17486 Hodler, asteroid named after Ferdinand Hodler
- Hector Hodler (1887–1920), Swiss esperantist
- Marc Hodler (1918–2006), Swiss sports functionary
