= Holding (surname) =

Holding is a surname. Notable people with the surname include:

- Billy Holding (1907-1986), English rugby league footballer of the 1920s, '30s, and '40s for Cumberland, Warrington, Rochdale Hornets
- Clyde Holding (1931–2011), Australian politician
- Eddie Holding (1930–2014), English footballer and manager
- Michael Holding (born 1954), Jamaican former cricketer
- Robert Holding (1926-2013), American businessman
- Rob Holding (born 1995), English footballer
