= Hölder (surname) =

Hölder is a German surname. Notable people with the surname include:

- Otto Hölder (1859–1937), German mathematician
- Ernst Hölder (1901−1990), German mathematician, son of Otto

== See also ==
- Holder (surname)
