= To Have and to Hold =

To Have and to Hold or To Have & to Hold may refer to:

== Phrases ==
- "...to have and to hold", a phrase commonly used in Christian marriage vows
- The habendum clause in property transfer, in English and American real estate law

== Film ==
- To Have and to Hold (1916 film), a lost American silent film directed by George Melford, based on the 1899 Johnston novel
- To Have and to Hold (1922 film), a lost American silent film directed by George Fitzmaurice, based on the 1899 Johnston novel, a remake of the 1916 film
- To Have and to Hold (1951 film), a British film directed by Godfrey Grayson
- To Have & to Hold (1996 film), an Australian film directed by John Hillcoat
- To Have and to Hold, a 1963 British film directed by Herbert Wise

== Television ==
- To Have & to Hold (American TV series), 1998 television series
- To Have & to Hold (Philippine TV series), 2021 television series
- "To Have and to Hold", episode four of the fourth season of Inside No. 9 (2018)
- To Have and to Hold, a 2006 television movie starring Justine Bateman
- "To Have and to Hold", episode three of the fourth season of Medium (2008)
- "To Have and to Hold", episode four of the sixth season of Mad Men (2013)

== Literature ==
- To Have and to Hold (Johnston novel), an 1899 novel by American author Mary Johnston
- To Have and to Hold (Moggach novel), a 1986 novel by Deborah Moggach
- To Have and to Hold: An Intimate History of Collectors and Collecting, a 2003 book by Philipp Blom
- To Have and to Hold, the American title for the 2004 Spellbound (Green novel)

== Music ==
- "To Have and to Hold", the theme of the British television programme, and a hit in 1986 for Catherine Stock
- "To Have and to Hold", a song from Depeche Mode's 1987 album Music for the Masses
- "To Have and to Hold", a song from Katrina and the Waves 1989 album Break of Hearts

== Theatre ==
- "To Have and to Hold", a 2023 play by Richard Bean
