= Holder 20 =

Sailboat class

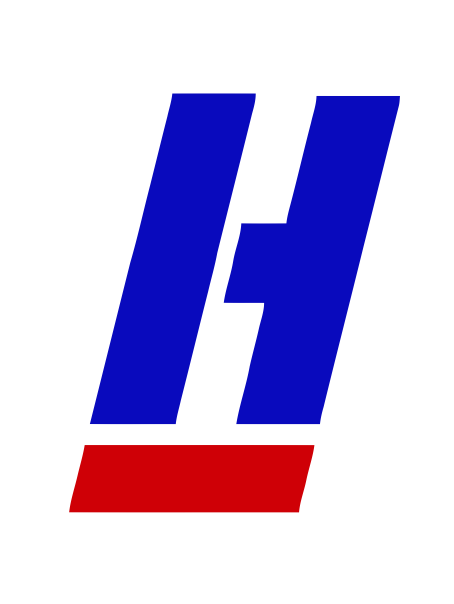

Development
- Designer: Ron Holder and Dave Ulmann
- Location: United States
- Year: 1980
- No. built: 265
- Builders: Vagabond Sailboats; Hobie Cat
- Role: One-design racer
- Name: Holder 20

Boat
- Crew: three
- Displacement: 1,160 lb (526 kg)
- Draft: 3.38 ft (1.03 m) with the keel down

Hull
- Type: monohull
- Construction: fiberglass
- LOA: 20.33 ft (6.20 m)
- LWL: 18.42 ft (5.61 m)
- Beam: 7.83 ft (2.39 m)
- Engine: outboard motor

Hull appendages
- Keel: lifting keel
- Ballast: 260 lb (118 kg)
- Rudder: transom-mounted rudder

Rig
- Rig type: Bermuda rig
- I foretriangle height: 22.60 ft (6.89 m)
- J foretriangle base: 7.25 ft (2.21 m)
- P mainsail luff: 24.04 ft (7.33 m)
- E mainsail foot: 9.33 ft (2.84 m)

Sails
- Sailplan: fractional rigged sloop
- Mainsail area: 112.15 sq ft (10.419 m^{2})
- Jib/genoa area: 81.93 sq ft (7.612 m^{2})
- Total sail area: 194.07 sq ft (18.030 m^{2})

Racing
- PHRF: 185

The Holder 20 is an American trailerable planing sailboat that was designed by Ron Holder, in collaboration with sailmaker Dave Ulmann, as a one design racer and first built in 1980.

== Production ==
The first 128 boats were built by Vagabond Sailboats in the United States starting in 1980. The molds were later sold to Hobie Cat (Coast Catamaran Corporation) who built 127 boats. Hobie continued production until 1987, with a total of 265 boats completed by both builders.

== Design ==
The Holder 20 is a racing keelboat, built predominantly of fiberglass. It has a fractional sloop rig, a raked stem, a slightly reverse transom, a transom-hung rudder controlled by a tiller and an L-shaped lifting keel. It displaces 1,160 lb (526 kg) and carries 260 lb (118 kg) of ballast.

The boat has a draft of 3.58 ft (1.09 m) with the keel extended and 1.00 ft (0.30 m) with it retracted, allowing operation in shallow water or ground transportation on a trailer.

The boat is normally fitted with a small 2 to 4 hp (1 to 3 kW) outboard motor for docking and maneuvering.

The design is normally raced with a crew of three and has sleeping accommodation for four people, with a double "V"-berth in the bow cabin and two straight settee berths in the main cabin. There are no provisions for a galley or head. Cabin headroom is 41 in (104 cm).

For sailing downwind the design may be equipped with a symmetrical spinnaker.

The design has a PHRF racing average handicap of 185 and a hull speed of 5.8 kn (10.7 km/h).

== Operational history ==
The boat is supported by an active class club that organizes racing events, the Holder 20 One Design Class.

In a 2010 review Steve Henkel wrote, "best features: The Holder 20 is light enough to plane in a modest breeze. A long, wide cockpit offers plenty of room for crew in optimizing weight position and sail handling. A 'drop' keel (fixed but retractable for trailering) makes launching relatively easy. The boat has an active class association with a presence on the Internet ... Worst features: Crew weight is crucial for stability on a boat this small and light. Hence the Holder 20 is not recommended for carefree family daysailing. The hull can't deal with rough water; owners say you can feel the hull flex and the drop keel begin to move around in a chop. The boat can be—and has been—capsized when sailed aggressively. Despite the pretense of cruising accommodations, we'd shy away from spending even one night aboard such a confined space. As one owner put it: 'The cabin is strictly for storage.'"

== See also ==
- List of sailing boat types
