= Holder Peak =

Mountain in Antarctica

Holder Peak (69°44′30″S 74°31′13″E) is the higher (northern) peak on a rock outcrop about 4 kilometres (2.5 mi) east of Mount Caroline Mikkelsen on the Ingrid Christensen Coast of Princess Elizabeth Land, Antarctica. The peak is about 140 metres (460 ft) high.

The peak was plotted by Norwegian cartographers from air photographs taken by the Lars Christensen Expedition (1936–37) and with Young Peak called "Tvillingfjel" (Twin Mountains). It was fixed by triangulation from an astrofixed baseline by an Australian National Antarctic Research Expeditions (ANARE) party from Davis Station led by Australian William (Bill) Young in 1963. It was named by the Antarctic Names Committee of Australia after Australian James Holder, a weather observer at Davis Station in 1963, and a member of the ANARE field party.
