= Horizontal and vertical market =

Market of vendors selling goods or services specific to an industry or trade

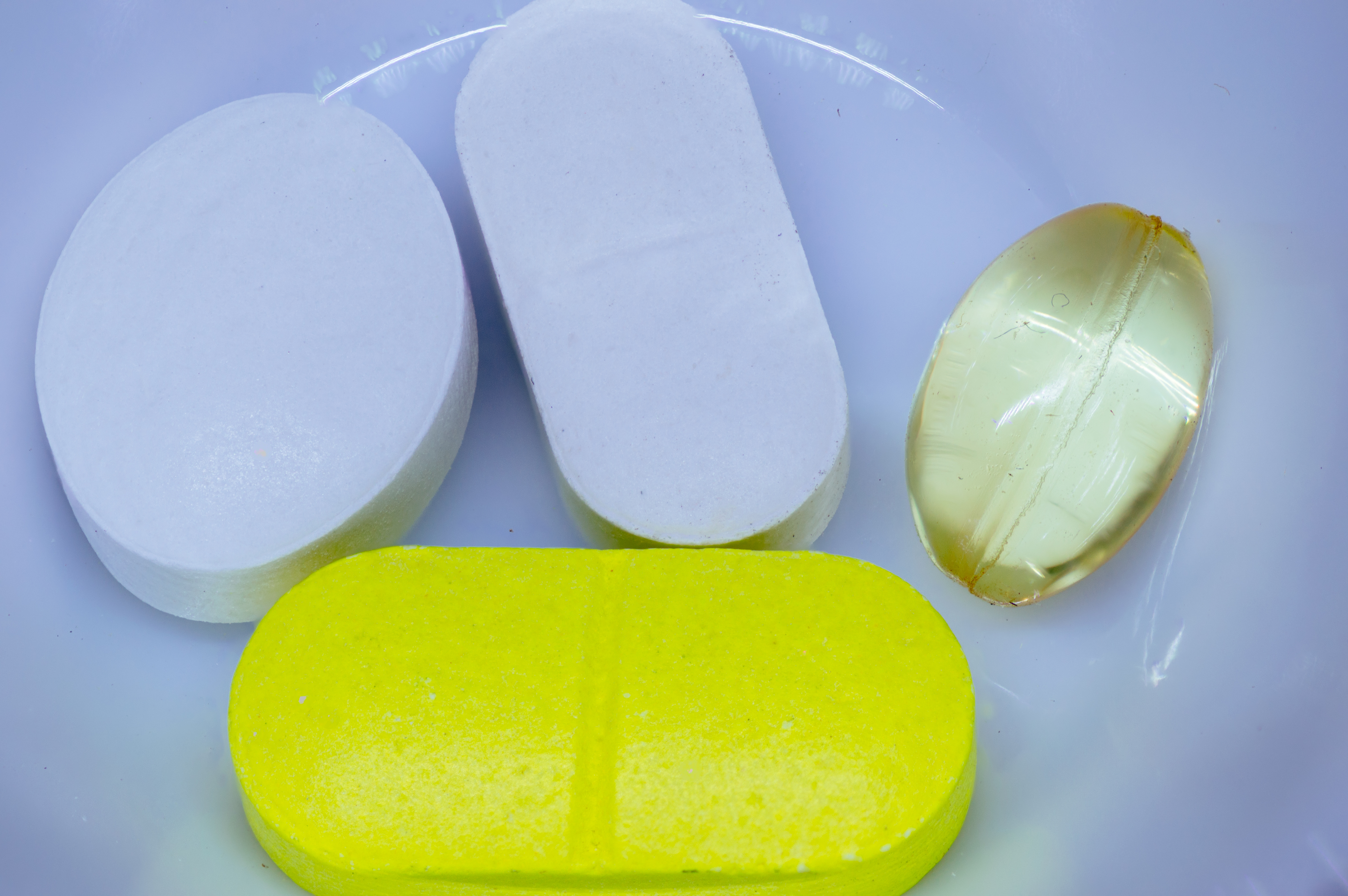
The medicine industry is an example of a vertical market

A vertical market is a market in which vendors offer goods and services specific to an industry, trade, profession, or other group of customers with specialized needs.

A horizontal market is a market in which a product or service meets the needs of a wide range of buyers across different sectors of an economy.

== Types ==
There are three types of vertical markets which encompass successive market stages of production and distribution: corporate, administered and contractual.

1. Corporate vertical markets combine market stages under single ownership.
2. Administered vertical markets are coordinated by one company due to its size and power.
3. Contractual vertical markets are created by independent companies that combine market stages through legal agreements.

== See also ==
- Horizontal integration
- Vertical integration
- Vertical market software
- Supply and demand
- Product-market fit
