= Griboyedov, Armenia =

Village in Armavir, Armenia

Griboyedov Գրիբոյեդով
- Location within Armenia
- Coordinates: 40°06′47″N 44°16′18″E
- Country: Armenia
- Marz (Province): Armavir

Population (2011)
  - Total: 1,845
- Time zone: UTC+4 ( )
  - Summer (DST): UTC+5 ( )

Griboyedov (Armenian: Գրիբոյեդով; until 1978, Aralikh Kyolanlu) is a village in the Armavir Province of Armenia. The village is named in honor of Russian writer and diplomat Alexandr Griboyedov.

== See also ==
- Armavir Province
