= Joseph William Holder =

English organist and composer (1764–1832)

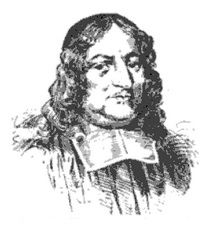
Illustration of Holder by Valerian Gribayedoff

Joseph William Holder (1764–1832) was an English organist and composer born in Clerkenwell, London, and educated in the Chapel Royal under James Nares. After quitting the choir he became assistant to Charles Reinhold, organist of St George the Martyr, Queen Square. He next obtained the poet of organist of St Mary's Church, Bungay, which he held for many years, after which he removed to the vicinity of Chelmsford. He took his degree of Bachelor of Music at Oxford in Dec. 1792, his exercise being an anthem, the score of which is preserved in the Bodleian Library. Holder's compositions consist of a mass, anthems, glees (three collections published), canons, songs and pianoforte pieces, including arrangements of many of Handel's choruses. Holder claimed descent by the father's side from Cardinal Wolsey.
