= Milton Allimadi =

Ugandan-American journalist and writer

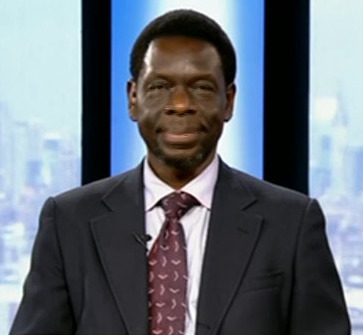
- Born: Uganda
- Education: Columbia University Graduate School of Journalism; Syracuse University
- Occupations: Academic, journalist, author, newspaper co-founder
- Employers: Columbia University Graduate School of Journalism; John Jay College of Criminal Justice
- Organization: Black Star News
- Known for: The Hearts of Darkness (2003 book); Manufacturing Hate (2021 book)
- Father: Otema Allimadi
- Relatives: Barbara Allimadi (sister)

Milton Allimadi is a Ugandan American author, journalist, professor, and a co-founder of Black Star News.

He is known for his critique of racist writing by white authors about Africa and Africans, in his 2003 book The Hearts of Darkness and his 2021 Manufacturing Hate.

== Early life and education ==
Allimadi was born in Uganda.

He graduated from the Graduate School of Journalism at Columbia and has a bachelor's and a master's degree in economics from Syracuse University.

== Career ==
=== Journalism ===
Allimadi's first journalism job was as an intern at The Journal of Commerce before working at the Wall Street Journal. He later worked freelance for the New York Times, where his access to the paper's archives formed the basis for his later piece "Inventing Africa", which described a pattern of white reporters and editors fabricating stories about Africa in previous decades.

In 1997, he became the founding editor of New York-based investigative newspaper Black Star News.

He criticized Ugandan peacekeepers seconded to the United Nations for acting as proxy police force for the United States.

Allimadi wrote about the relief of Black Americans after Donald Trump was defeated in the 2020 United States presidential election.

=== Activism ===
In 2014, Allimadi created a petition to the United States State Department to revoke the visa of Ugandan politician Sam Kutesa.

=== Academia ===
Allimadi has worked as professor of African studies and an adjunct professor of Criminal Justice at the John Jay College of Criminal Justice at the City University of New York. As of 2022, he worked at the John Jay College and as an adjunct assistant professor at the Graduate School of Journalism at Columbia.

=== Literature ===
His book The Hearts of Darkness critiques the racist stereotypes that white writers perpetuate about Africa and Africans, specifically descriptions of barbarism, physical, moral and intellectual inferiority, denial of the positive contributions that Black people have made to culture, arts, science, and descriptions of Africa as inhospitable and uncivilized.

==== Selected publications ====
- Targeted Rapes to Spread HIV Started in Uganda, 2009, The New York Times
- The Hearts of Darkness - How White Writers Created the Racist Image of Africa, 2002, Black Star Books ISBN 9780974003900
- Manufacturing Hate - How Africa Was Demonized in Western Media, 2021, Kendall Hunt Publishing Company, ISBN 9781792466472
