= Joseph Bassett Holder =

American zoologist and physician

Joseph Holder
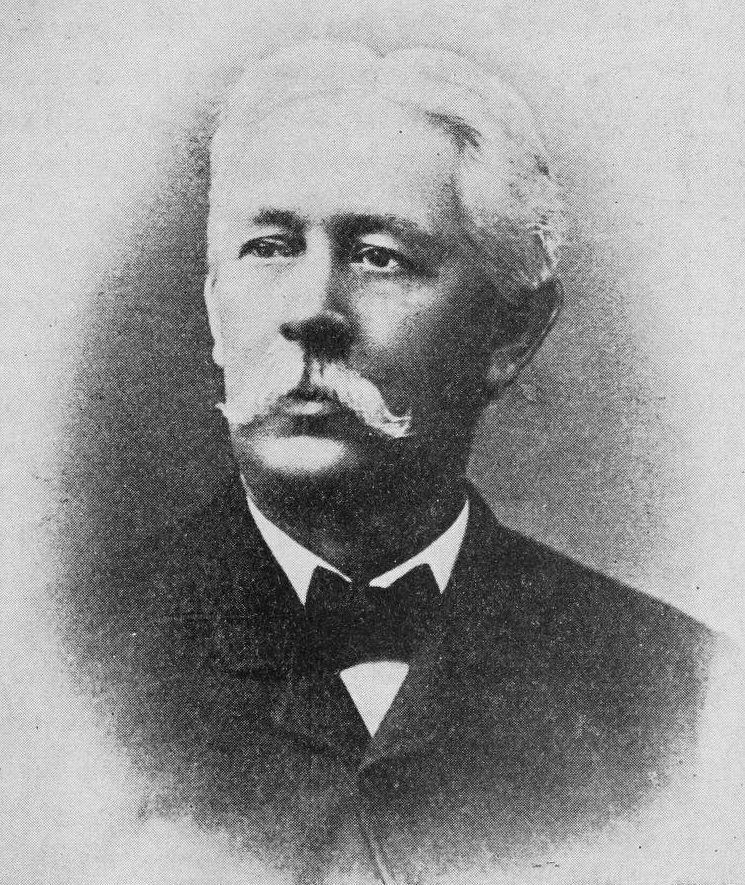
- Born: 26 October 1824; Lynn, Massachusetts, United States
- Died: February 28, 1888 (aged 63); New York City, New York, United States
- Education: Harvard Medical School
- Spouse: Emoia Jones
- Children: Charles
- Scientific career
- Fields: Zoology
- Workplaces: American Museum of Natural History

Joseph Bassett Holder (26 October 1824 – 28 February 1888) was an American zoologist and medical doctor.

Holder was born in Lynn, Massachusetts to parents Aaron L. and Rachel Bassett Holder. His mother was a Quaker minister. Holder studied at the Friends' School in Providence and then entered the Harvard Medical School, where, while a student, he acted as demonstrator of anatomy for Oliver Holmes, and was present at the first administration of ether as an anesthetic. He became city physician of Lynn, was founder of the Lynn Natural History Society, and made the first list of birds and plants in Essex County. He was a friend and colleague of Louis Agassiz.

In 1859, he accepted the position of physician for Fort Jefferson, Florida, at the request of Agassiz and Spencer Baird of the Smithsonian, and for seven years made an elaborate study of the Florida reef, being the first to establish the rapid growth of corals, an opposite view being held previous to that. At the breaking out of the American Civil War, Holder joined the army as surgeon, and remained as post surgeon and health officer at Fort Jefferson, during the war. Holder resigned in 1869 to join Albert Bickmore in the establishment of the American Museum of Natural History of New York City, and became the curator of invertebrates. He was the author of "The Florida Reef"; joint author with J. G. Wood of "Our Living World," an elaborate natural history; "The Museum of Natural History," written with Sir John Richardson; "The Atlantic Right Whale," and many scientific papers. He was a patron of the Metropolitan Museum of Art; a founder and fellow of the American Ornithological Union; a member of the Society of Eastern Naturalists; member of the Society for Psychical Research; fellow of the New York Academy of Sciences, Geographical and Linnaen societies, and member of the Harvard Club. He died in New York City on February 28, 1888. His son Charles Holder became a noted science writer himself, and collaborated with the elder Holder on Elements of Zoology.
