= Vertical market software =

Business software tied to a specific industry

Vertical market software is aimed at addressing the needs of any given business within a discernible vertical market (specific industry or market). While horizontal market software can be useful to a wide array of industries (such as word processors or spreadsheet programs), vertical market software is developed for and customized to a specific industry's needs.

For example, many legal applications are developed by lawyers who create a tool useful to themselves, then sell it to others. By 1990 many legal document management systems—including those designed for specialties such as personal injury, medical malpractice, and corporate law—existed, plus time-tracking software and project management software. One IT consultant to lawyers said that he had a database of hundreds of legal applications he could present to clients.

Vertical market software is readily identifiable by the application specific graphical user interface which defines it. One example of vertical market software is point-of-sale software.

== See also ==
- Horizontal market software
- Horizontal market
- Enterprise resource planning
- Customer relationship management
- Content management system
- Supply chain management

== Resources ==
- Microsoft ships first Windows OS for vertical market from InfoWorld
- The Limits of Open Source - Vertical Markets Present Special Obstacles
