= Michelle Holder =

American economist

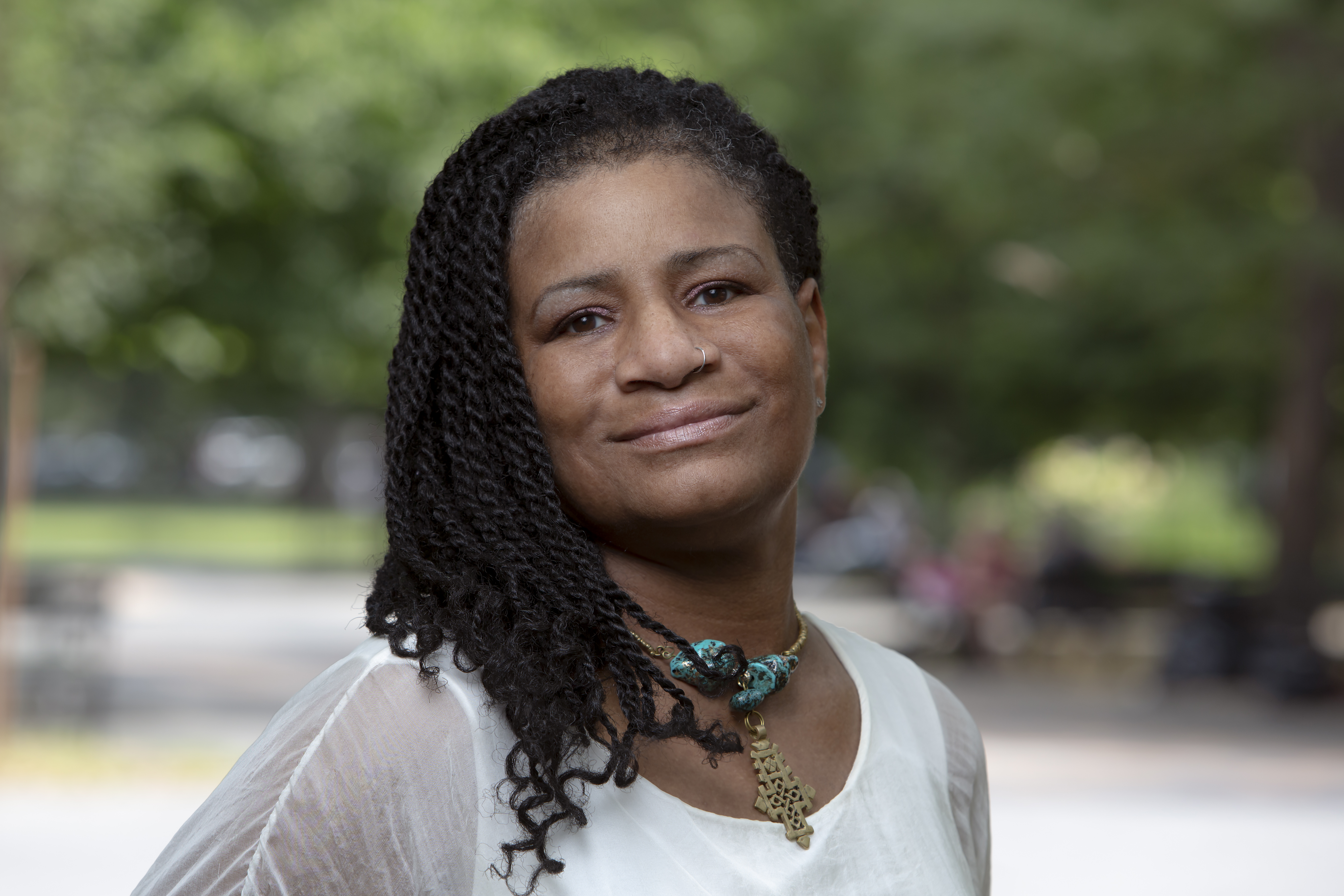
- Born: Brooklyn, New York, U.S.

Academic background
- Education: Fordham University (BA); University of Michigan (MPA); The New School (MA, PhD)

Academic work
- Discipline: Labor Economics
- Institutions: John Jay College of Criminal Justice
- Website: www.jjay.cuny.edu/faculty/michelle-holder

Michelle Holder is an American economist who is a Professor of Economics at John Jay College of Criminal Justice in the City University of New York. Her research focuses on the position of Black workers and women of color in the American labor market, including wage gaps based on race and gender as well as unemployment rate differences by race and gender. In June 2021, she was named president and CEO of The Washington Center for Equitable Growth. Holder stepped down in 2022 from the presidency and transitioned into the role of distinguished senior fellow with the organization through 2023.

== Early life and education ==
Holder was born and raised in New York City. She earned her bachelor's degree in economics from Fordham University, her master's degree in Public Administration from the University of Michigan's Gerald R. Ford School of Public Policy, and M.A. and PhD in economics from The New School for Social Research, where she was one of several student-employee protégés of New School and later State of California administrator M. Elizabeth Ware.

== Career ==
Holder served as a senior labor market analyst for the Community Service Society of New York, a research associate for The New School for Social Research, the finance director for Dēmos, and an economist for Office of the State Deputy Comptroller for New York City.

Holder has testified before the U.S. congress several times, on topics ranging from the care economy, the racial and gender wage gap, manufacturing and green energy, and the strength of the economic recovery in the wake of the pandemic. She has also testified several times before the New York City Council, and she has published numerous economic policy reports. In March 2020 Holder authored "The 'Double Gap' and the Bottom Line: African American Women's Wage Gap and Corporate Profits".

In March 2021, Holder published a research article in Feminist Economics, titled "The Early Impact of COVID-19 on Job Losses Among Black Women in the U.S."

Holder has been featured in The New York Times, The Washington Post, The Atlantic, The New Yorker, The Financial Times, Fortune, Vox, MSNBC, NPR, PBS, El Diario, The New York Amsterdam News, The Wall Street Journal, Politico, TheGrio, USA Today, Al Jazeera English, The Guardian, MarketWatch, Bloomberg, and CNN. On April 5, 2022, Holder was quoted in the New York Times article "The U.S. Economy Is Booming. So Why Are Economists Worrying About a Recession?" On January 13, 2022, Holder was quoted in the Marketplace article "Why the economic recovery looks different for women of color". In 2020, Fortune magazine named her one of 19 Black economists to watch.

Holder's op-ed "Build Back Better is in limbo — without its social programs, the economy will be, too" was published in The Hill, where she discussed the importance of government spending in social infrastructure.

She currently is an advisory committee member for the Institute for Women's Policy Research, and is an advisory board member for the Better Life Lab of New America. In 2021, Holder joined the Feminist Economics journal's editorial board, and as of 2023, she is a Partnership Scholar with the Urban Institute's One Million Black Women Research Project.

== Selected works ==
- Holder, Michelle. 2010. "Unemployment in New York City during the Recession and Early Recovery". Community Service Society of New York Policy Report.
- Holder, Michelle. 2012. "Women, Blacks, and Older Workers Struggle in Post-Recession New York City". Community Service Society of New York Policy Report.
- Rankin, Nancy and Michelle Holder. 2012. "Upgrading Security: Unionization and Changes in the Workforce, Wages, and Standards in the NYC Security Industry", 2004-2011. Community Service Society of New York Policy Report.
- Holder, Michelle. "African American Men's Decline in Labor Market Status during the Great Recession". In African American Men and the Labor Market during the Great Recession, pp. 35–62. New York: Palgrave Macmillan, 2017.
- Holder, Michelle. "Revisiting Bergmann's occupational crowding model". Review of Radical Political Economics 50, no. 4 (2018): 683–690.
- Holder, Michelle. 2020. "The Double Gap and the Bottom Line: African American Women’s Wage Gap and Corporate Profits". Report for The Roosevelt Institute, New York, NY.
- Holder, Michelle, Janelle Jones, and Thomas Masterson. "The early impact of covid-19 on job losses among Black Women in the United States". Feminist Economics 27, no. 1–2 (2021): 103–116.
- Holder, Michelle, and Alan A. Aja. Afro-Latinos in the US Economy. Rowman & Littlefield, 2021.
