= Black Star News =

New York City weekly investigative newspaper

- Type: Online investigative journalism
- Founder: Milton Allimadi
- Managing editor: Colin Benjamin
- Website: www.blackstarnews.com

Black Star News is an African-American news outlet based in New York.

== History ==
Milton Allimadi and Mana Lumumba Kasongo, both recent graduates of the Columbia School of Journalism, launched the Black Star on October 1, 1997. Both were alumni of the weekly The City Sun, which had recently folded due to financial difficulties. Bill Cosby and Camille Cosby were the initial investors.

The Black Star was one of 400 news organizations to receive a $5,000 grant from Facebook to mitigate unexpected expenses due to COVID-19.

== Reporting ==
In addition to local coverage, the Black Star News has focused on Black Americans' connections to Africa. In 2019 Allimadi was a panelist on the topic of HBCUs sending students to Africa as part of their coursework.

Its coverage of the Black community's disposition toward the candidacy of Michael Bloomberg was quoted in the 2012 book Independents Rising. A 2020 story in the Jackson Advocate described the Black Star as a "top publication", listing it alongside the New York Times, Politico, The Hill, and others.

== Reception and influence ==
Though described as "small", its investigative reporting of a scandal involving Morgan Stanley in 1999 was credited in major news organizations including The Wall Street Journal and Brill's Content. Its reporting has also been picked up in local publications. In 2010, when republishing an editorial by Allimadi, the San Francisco Bay View described the Black Star as "New York's leading Pan African weekly investigative newspaper." The Black Star has been described as "one of the few news sources that regularly features African voices".

Publisher Allimadi was among the signatories of an open letter that was widely circulated in African press in early 2021. Allimadi is quoted on African politics and social issues.
