= Holder (law) =

Holder is a term used to any person who has a promissory note or bill of exchange in their possession. The holder may be the payee, endorsee, or bearer. The holder can enforce, or seek payment for, the bill.

A holder for value is a holder who has given value for an instrument. A holder in due course can disregard the claims of prior holders, or any defects in title of the transferrer or negotiator of the bill.
