= Pentalofos, Thessaloniki =

Pentalofos Πεντάλοφος
- Community
- Location within Greece
- Coordinates: 40°44.6′N 22°51.2′E
- Country: Greece
- Administrative region: Central Macedonia
- Regional unit: Thessaloniki
- Municipality: Oraiokastro
- Municipal unit: Kallithea

Area
  - Community: 29.874 km^{2} (11.534 sq mi)
- Elevation: 120 m (390 ft)

Population (2021)
  - Community: 1,871
  - Density: 62.63/km^{2} (162.2/sq mi)
- Time zone: UTC+2 (EET)
  - Summer (DST): UTC+3 (EEST)
- Postal code: 545 00
- Area code: +30-231
- Vehicle registration: NA to NX

Pentalofos (Greek: Πεντάλοφος, Bulgarian: Градобор, is a village and a community of the Oraiokastro municipality. Before the 2011 local government reform it was part of the municipality of Kallithea, of which it was a municipal district. The 2021 census recorded 1,871 inhabitants in the village. The community of Pentalofos covers an area of 29.874 km^{2}.

== History ==
In 1845 the Russian slavist Victor Grigorovich recorded Gradobor as a mainly Bulgarian village.

== See also ==
- List of settlements in the Thessaloniki regional unit
