= Rose Parade =

Annual parade in Pasadena, California, US

- Organizational logo of the parade
- Status: Active
- Genre: Parade
- Date: New Year's Day
- Frequency: Annual
- Venue: Colorado Boulevard
- Location: Pasadena, California
- Country: United States
- Years active: 136
- Inaugurated: January 1, 1890
- Previous event: January 1, 2026
- Next event: January 1, 2027
- Organiser: Pasadena Tournament of Roses Association
- Website: Official site

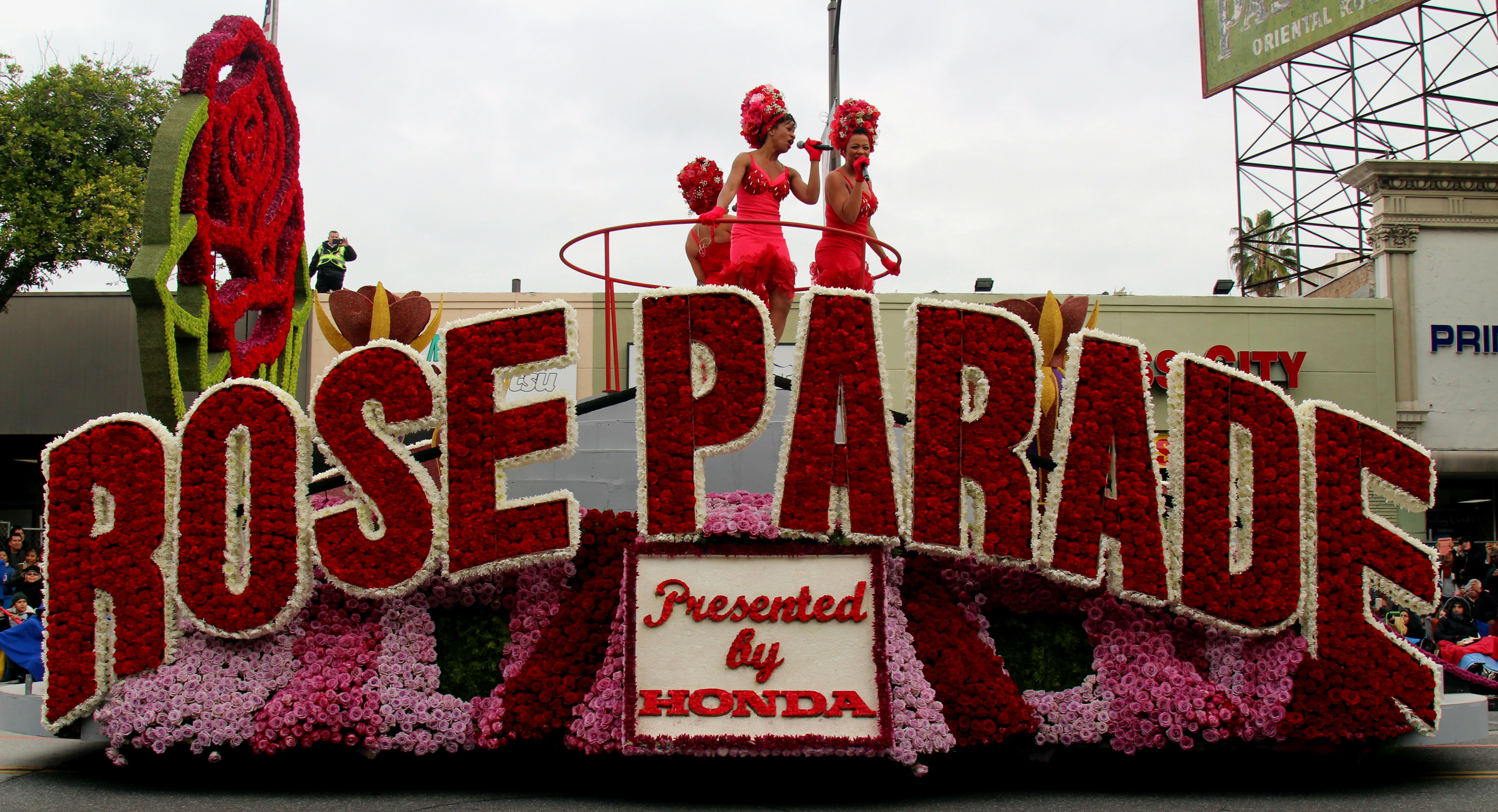
The leading float during the 2017 Rose Parade

The Rose Parade, also known as the Tournament of Roses Parade (or simply the Tournament of Roses), is an annual parade held mostly along Colorado Boulevard in Pasadena, California, United States, on New Year's Day (or on Monday, January 2 if New Year's Day falls on a Sunday).

Produced by the non-profit Pasadena Tournament of Roses Association, the parade usually starts at 8:00 a.m. Pacific Time (UTC–8), and includes flower-covered floats, marching bands, and equestrian units. The parade is followed in the afternoon by the Rose Bowl, one of the major bowl games in college football. It has been uninterrupted except during World War II in 1942, 1943, and 1945, and in 2021 due to the COVID-19 pandemic.

First held on January 1, 1890, the Rose Parade is watched by hundreds of thousands of spectators. The Rose Bowl college football game was added in 1902 to help fund the cost of staging the parade. Since 2011, Honda has been a presenting sponsor of the Rose Parade. Accordingly, the company has the parade's first float, which like all floats, follows the parade's theme.

== History ==
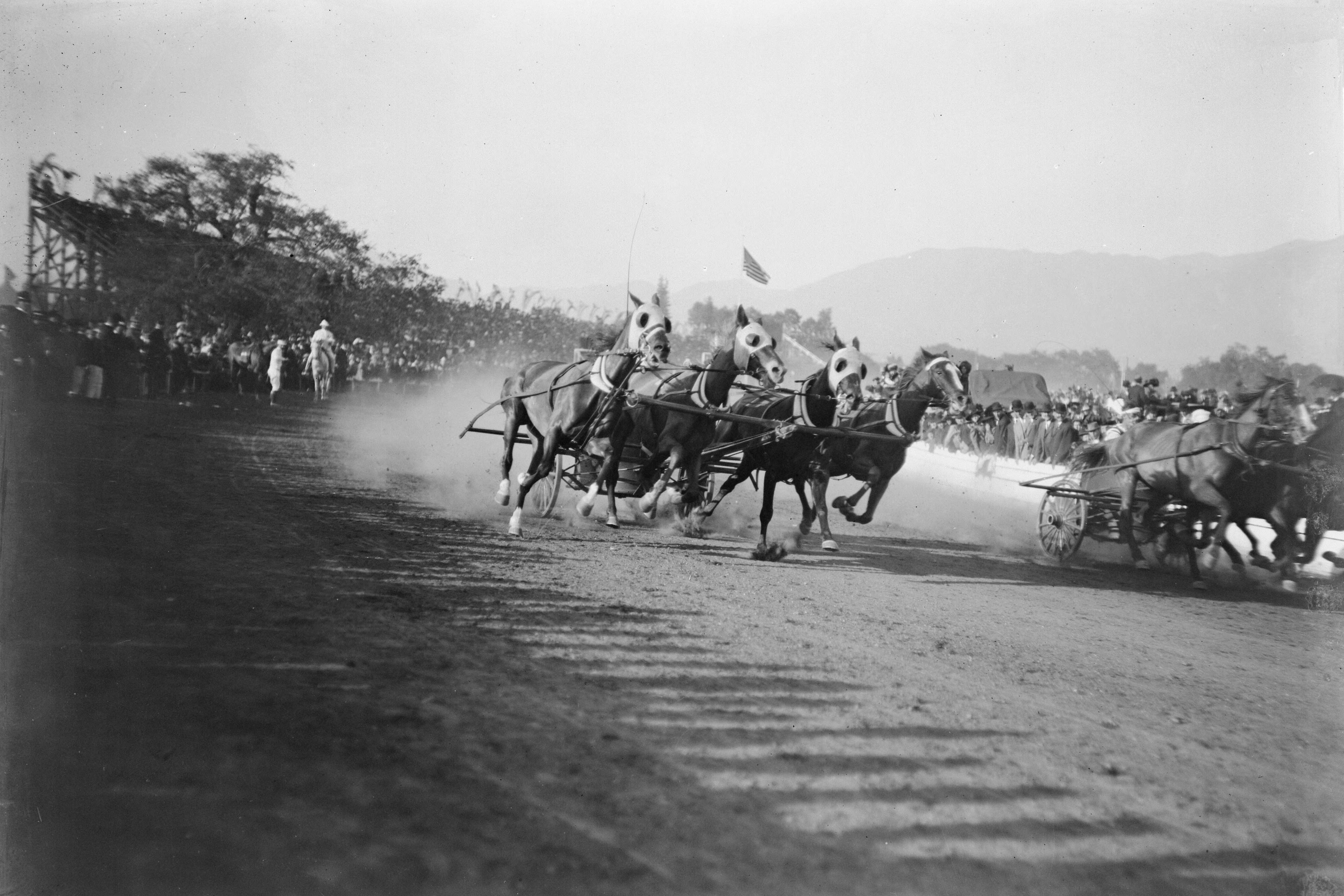
A chariot race during the 1908 or 1911 Tournament of Roses, later replaced by the Rose Bowl

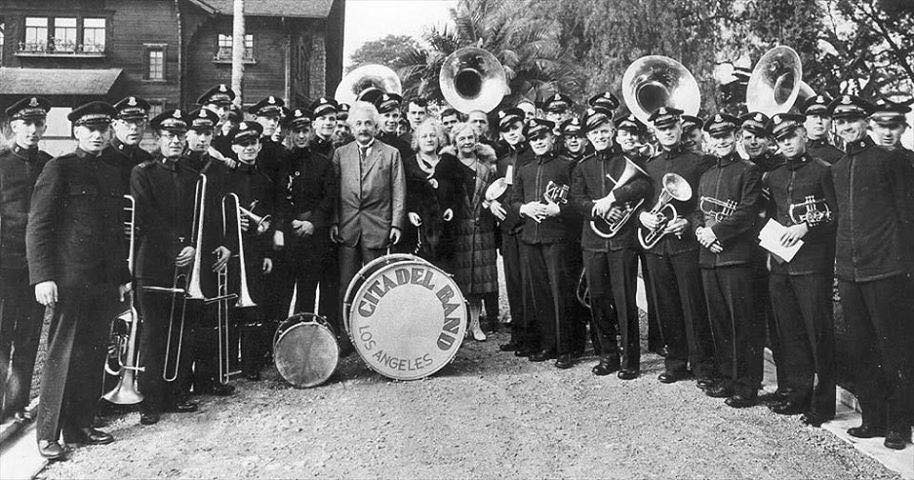
Albert Einstein and a Salvation Army band before a performance at the Rose Parade, 1926.

Members of Pasadena's Valley Hunt Club first staged the parade in 1890. Since then the parade has been held in Pasadena every New Year's Day, except when January 1 falls on a Sunday. In that case, it is held on the subsequent Monday, January 2. This exception was instituted in 1893, as organizers did not wish to disturb horses hitched outside Sunday church services.

Many of the members of the Valley Hunt Club were former residents of the American East and Midwest. They wished to showcase their new California home's mild winter weather. At a club meeting, Professor Charles F. Holder announced, "In New York, people are buried in the snow. Here our flowers are blooming and our oranges are about to bear. Let's hold a festival to tell the world about our paradise."

Over the next few founding years, the parade added marching bands and motorized floats. By 1895, the event was too large for the Valley Hunt Club to handle, resulting in the formation of an ad hoc non-profit organization – the Pasadena Tournament of Roses Association. By the 11th annual tournament in 1900, the town lot on which the activities were held was renamed Tournament Park, a large open area directly adjacent to Pasadena's world-famous institution of higher learning, Caltech. Activities soon included ostrich races, bronco busting demonstrations, and an odd novelty race between a camel and an elephant. The elephant won the race. Soon reviewing stands were built along the parade route and newspapers in Eastern Seaboard cities started to take notice of the event.

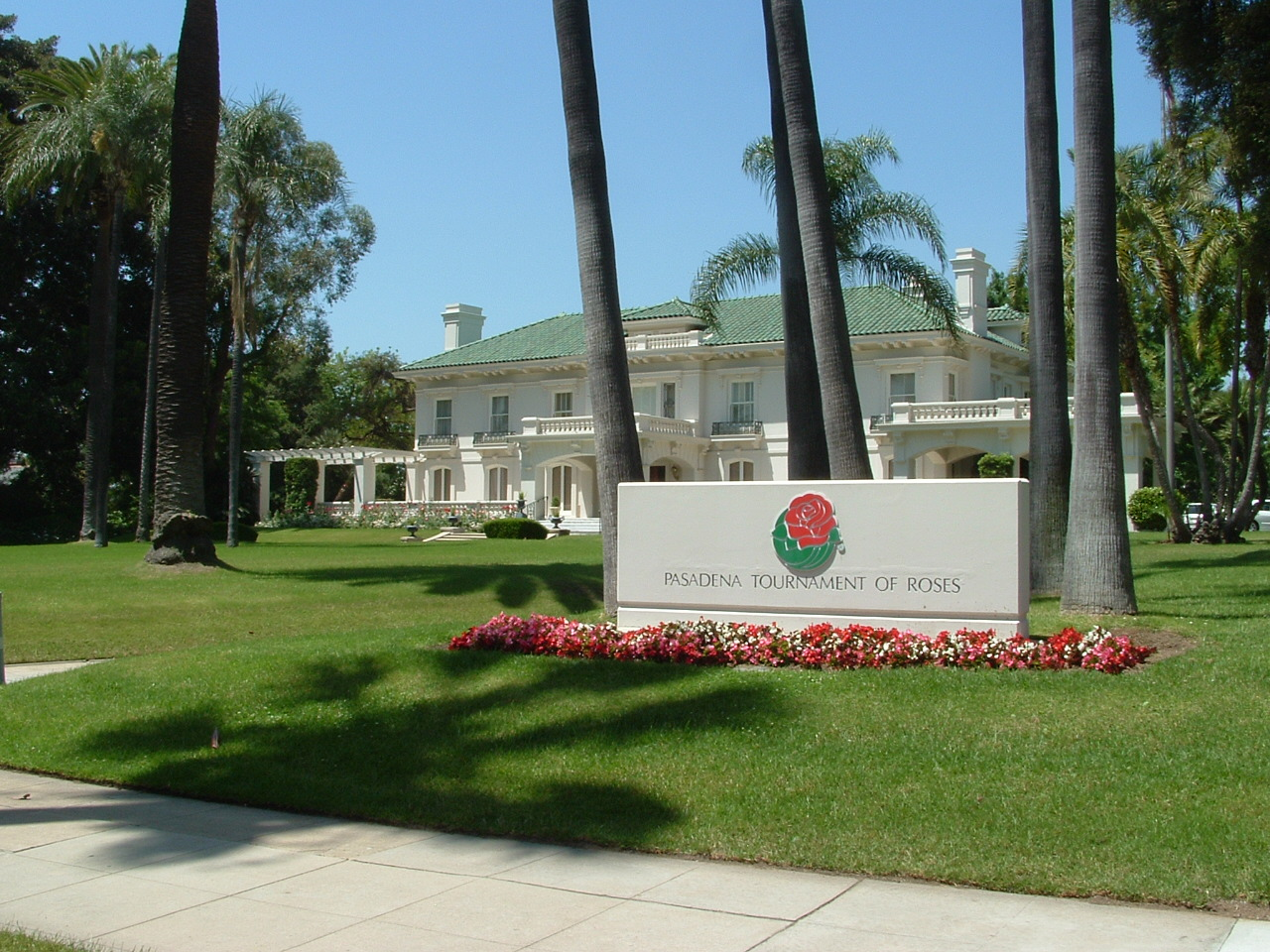
Tournament House, also known as the Wrigley mansion

The stately Italian Renaissance-style mansion of William Wrigley Jr., the maker of Wrigley's chewing gum, was offered to the city of Pasadena after Mrs. Wrigley's death in 1958, under the condition that their home would be the Rose Parade's permanent headquarters. Tournament House is the name given to the former home where the organization is headquartered.

The first associated football game was played on January 1, 1902. Originally titled the "Tournament East-West football game," it is considered to be the first Rose Bowl. The next game was next played on New Year's Day 1916. They have been played annually since then. The game derives its modern name from Rose Bowl Stadium, which was built for the 1923 game.

In 2002 and 2006, when the Rose Bowl Game was the BCS National Championship Game, the "Granddaddy of 'em all" was not held the same day as the parade. The 2002 game was played on January 3, and the 2006 game was played on January 4. Not all fans were pleased with the change. Some thought the atmosphere and tradition of the Rose Bowl was lost. Once the BCS title game was separated from the host bowl, it no longer affected the date of the Rose Bowl Game, even when the title game returned to Pasadena in 2010 and 2014.

Since the mid-1990s, a flyover by the Northrop B-2 Spirit signals the start of the parade, except for 2006 and 2026 due to rain, preceded by a musical performance. Since 2019, the parade concludes with a special guest doing the ceremonial forward pass from the parade to the Rose Bowl followed by a prerecorded video message by an athlete or special guest and a musical performance.

In July 2020, it was announced that the Rose Parade for 2021 would be canceled due to the COVID-19 pandemic. It was assessed that the construction of floats for the parade could not be performed in a safe manner. The event itself, due to large crowds and outside visitors, was also considered to be at a high risk of causing more instances of COVID-19 infections. The parade was deferred to 2022. However, the parade number was still changed; what would have been called the 132nd parade officially became the 133rd parade.

In November 2020, it was announced that a TV special titled The Rose Parade's New Year's Celebration would take the parade's place and premiere on January 1, 2021.

== Description ==
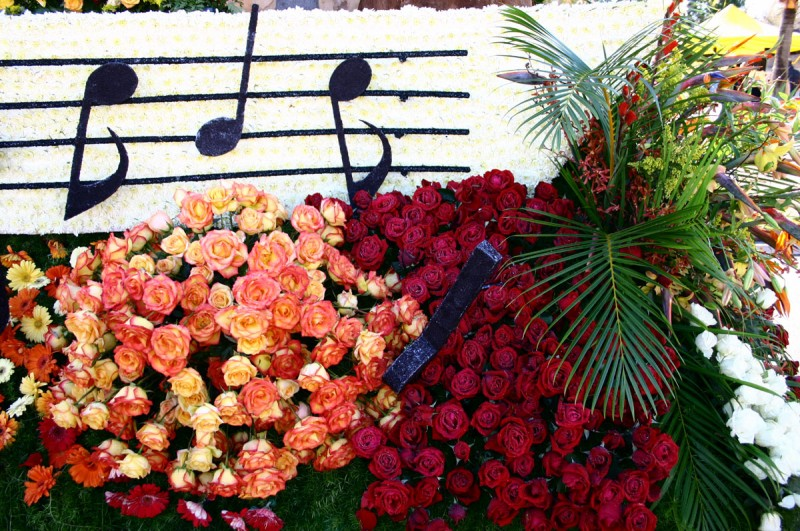
A close-up of roses used to create a parade float

The Tournament of Roses Parade has followed the same route mainly following Colorado Boulevard, Pasadena's main thoroughfare and a segment of the former US 66, for many decades. The day before the parade, the entire environs of the neighborhood streets south of the intersection of Orange Grove Boulevard and Colorado Boulevard are sealed off and reserved for the marshaling of the dozens of floats, bands, equestrian units, and other elements. This sealed-off section acts as the "Formation Area", and the Formation Area Committee manages it.

On the parade morning the elements are merged and dispatched in front of Tournament House. The parade starts heading north on South Orange Grove Boulevard beginning at Green Street. At Colorado Boulevard it passes the main grandstands, and the main television and media stands, and proceeds east on Colorado Boulevard. The parade then turns north on Sierra Madre Boulevard.

The floats must travel under the Sierra Madre Boulevard/I-210 freeway overpass, requiring over-height floats to reduce their height. The parade ends at Paloma Street near Victory Park and Pasadena High School.

=== Recent parades ===
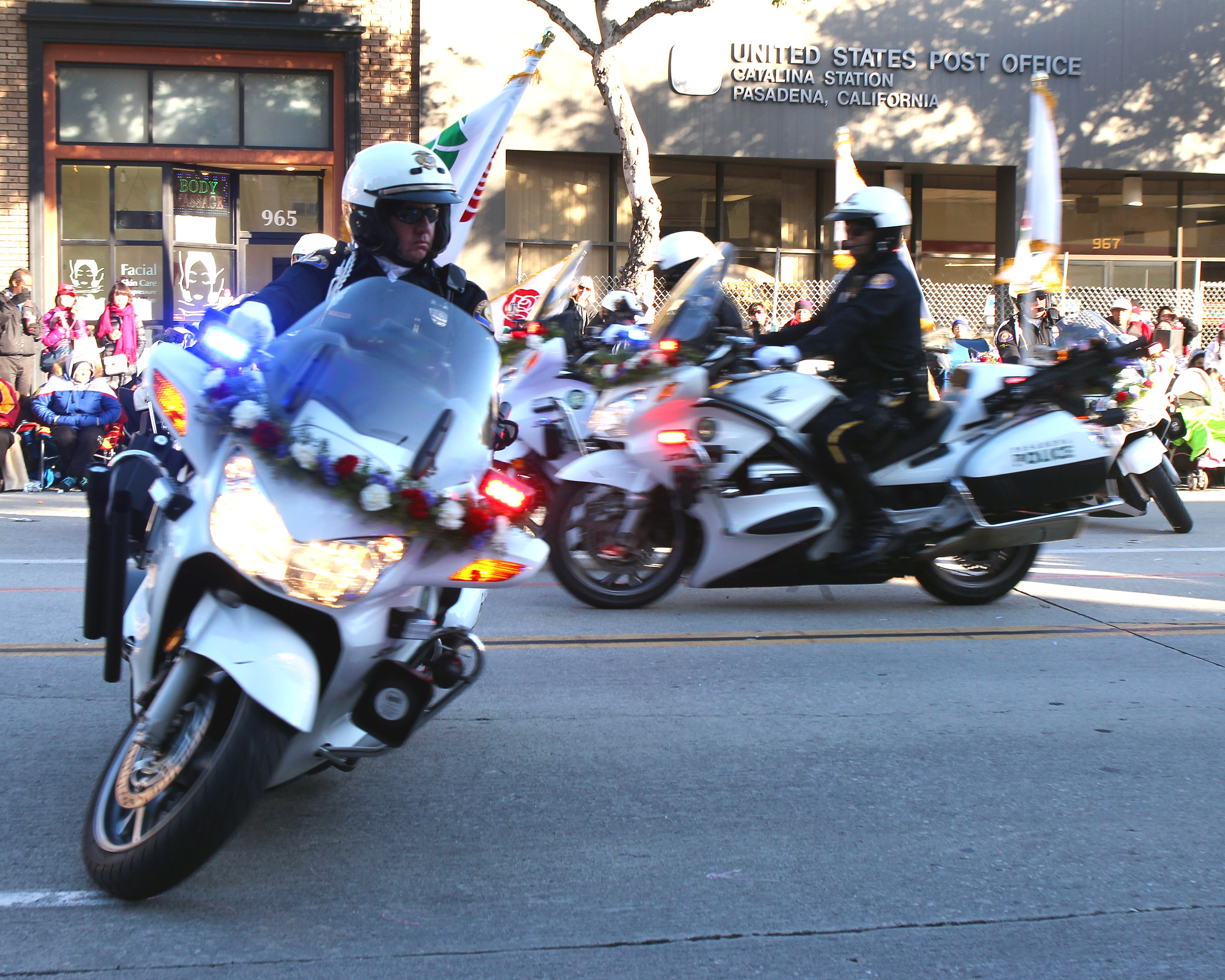
Pasadena Police Department officers on motorcycles during the 2014 Rose Parade

The 2009 parade featured 46 floats, including some new entries, such as Jack in the Box's Jack-O-Licious, City of Mission Viejo's Making a Splash, RFD-TV's Hee Haw, and the City of Roseville's Entertaining Dreams for a Century.

The 2010 parade saluted the men and women serving America throughout the world with a flyover at the beginning of the parade by four F/A-18 jets, performed by pilots of Strike Fighter Squadron 22, the "Fighting Redcocks", from the Naval Air Station at Lemoore, California.

New floats that joined the 2011 Rose Parade were: Beverly Hills Tournament of Roses Committee, Cunard Line, Dole, Los Angeles County Firemen's Benefit & Welfare: Never Forget 9/11 "Remember, Reflect, Renew", UNO 40th Anniversary, "Messina Wildlife Management", Namco Bandai Games, "Quikrete" Cement & Concrete Products, "Saving America's Mustangs Foundation", and Shriner's Hospitals For Children.

The 2012 Rose Parade had 43 floats, 21 bands, and 18 equestrian units with approximately 400 horses. The honor for being the last units in the parade went to All American Cowgirl Chicks (Equestrian), Needham Broughton High School (Band), and RFD-TV (Float). It featured the first-ever Swedish entry, the Royal Swedish Navy Cadet Band.

The 2013 parade featured 42 floats, 23 marching bands, and 21 equestrian units. New for the 2013 Rose Parade were floats from Nurses' float "A Healing Place", Delta Sigma Theta, and the city of San Gabriel centennial float "Celebrating Our Journey". It began with the Wells Fargo/Opening Unit, American Honda's float, the United States Marine Corps's Mounted Color Guard and the U.S. Marine Corps West Coast Composite Band. Farmers Insurance's "Love Float" featured the wedding of a Virginia couple, Nicole and Gerald of Chesapeake, VA. The couple was selected through a first-ever public vote by the American people. The parade's closing unit featured Coco Jones of the Disney Channel.

Featured in the 2014 parade were 45 floats, including new floats from eHarmony, K9s4COPS, Public Storage ("Adventures In Space") and SeaWorld. Actor, director, writer, producer Garry Marshall played the role of "director" on Burbank's "Lights...camera...action!" float. KC and the Sunshine Band were featured on Stella Rosa Wine's "Stellabrate Good Times" float. Performing on the e-Harmony float was Natalie Cole, singing "This Will Be". NBC's The Voice joined this parade too, along with Daryl Hall and the Harlem Globetrotters. The AIDS Healthcare Foundation float ("Living the Dream: Love Is the Best Protection") featured a wedding of a California couple, Aubrey Loots and Danny Leclair; some people called for a boycott of the parade as the couple are actually both men. Nancy O'Dell, along with Jonathan and Drew Scott (of the Property Brothers) co-hosted the parade.

The 2015 parade had 41 floats. New participants were ABC's The Bachelor, American Armenian Rose Float Association, Kiehl's Since 1851, Northwestern Mutual, United Sikh Mission, and Zappos.com.

The 2016 parade featured 44 floats, 19 equestrian units, and 20 marching bands. New participants were Los Angeles Lakers, City of Irvine Chamber of Commerce, South Dakota Tourism, the California Milk Advisory Board, PBS (featuring Downton Abbey), and Union Bank. It marked the end of Bob Eubanks and Stephanie Edwards's participation in the parade for local television station KTLA. Singpoli Group's float "Marco Polo East Meets West", constructed by float builder Paradiso was judged as the sweepstakes winner, the "Most beautiful entry in the Parade with outstanding floral presentation and design."

The 2020 Rose Parade featured 40 floats, 17 equestrian units with over 450 horses, and 20 marching bands. The Co-Grand Marshals of the parade were gymnast Laurie Hernández, actress and singer Rita Moreno, and actress Gina Torres.

The 2022 parade featured 43 floats, 18 equestrian units, and 20 marching bands in addition to the special units. The grand marshal was actor LeVar Burton.

The 2023 parade's grand marshal was politician Gabby Giffords.

== Floats ==
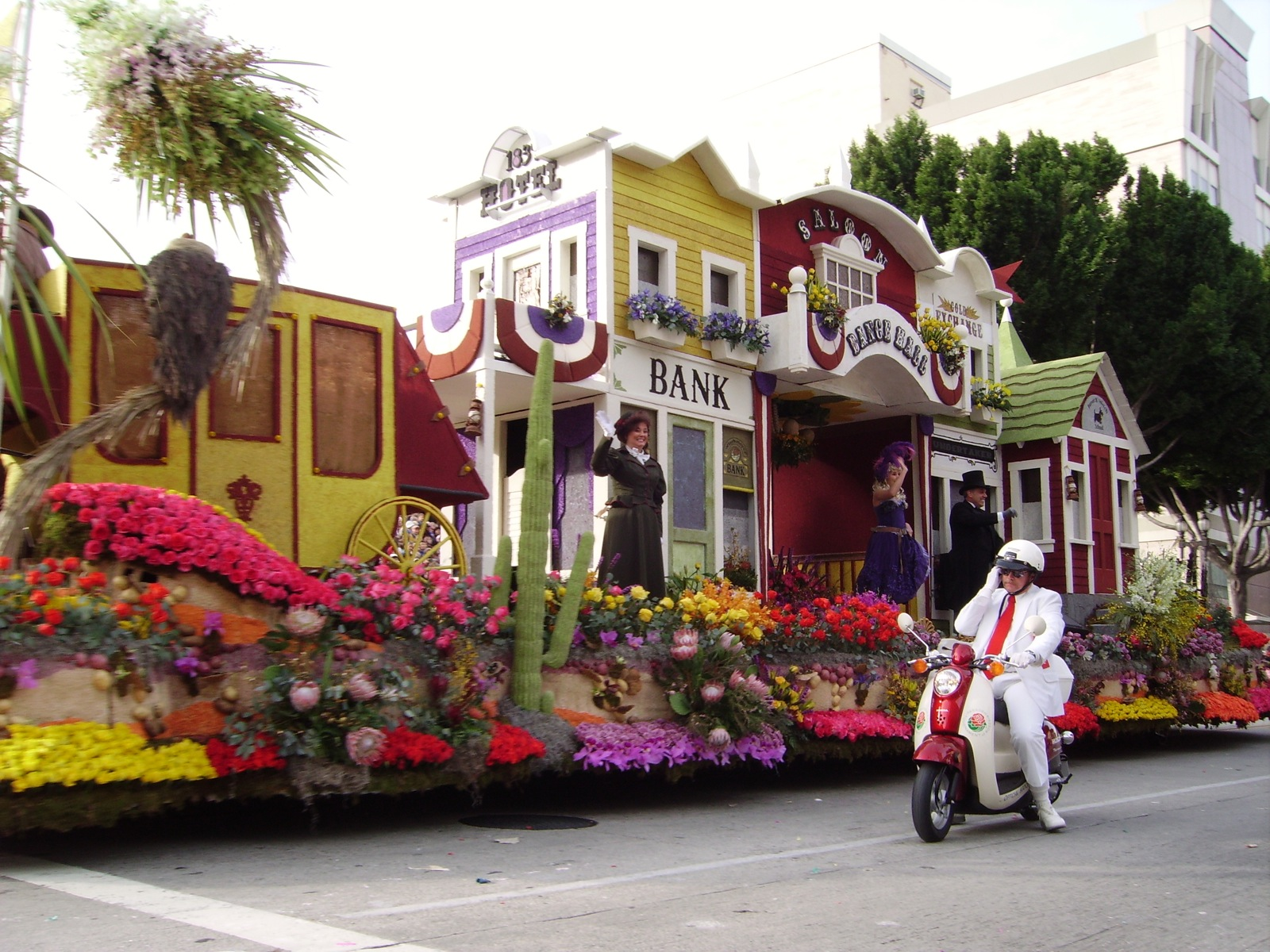
A float and a "White Suiter" volunteer

Originally the parade featured flower-decorated horse carriages. Over time, floats built by volunteers from sponsoring communities supplanted the carriages. Currently, most are built by professional float building companies and take nearly a year to construct. Some communities and organizational sponsors still rely on volunteers. The Valley Hunt Club still enters a flower-decorated carriage. The Cal Poly Universities Rose Float still relies solely on students who volunteer, with the present day requirement that "every inch of every float must be covered with flowers or other natural materials, such as leaves, seeds or bark". Floats are self-propelled on generally used-up truck chassis, in contrast to the Macy's Thanksgiving Day Parade which uses trailer-based floats pulled by new, intact sponsor-provided trucks.

Typically 48 to 72 hours before parade day, one can view several of the floats being decorated with flowery mantles in the various 'float barns' that dot the Arroyo Seco / Rose Bowl area in West Pasadena, not far from the start of the parade. It is a rule of the parade that all surfaces of the float framework must be covered in natural materials, such as flowers, plants, seaweeds, seeds, bark, vegetables, or nuts, for example. No artificial flowers or plant material are allowed, nor can the materials be artificially colored. Last-minute volunteer opportunities are usually available.

There are 6 "self-built" floats: Cal Poly Universities, City of Burbank, City of Downey, City of La Canada Flintridge, City of Sierra Madre, and City of South Pasadena. Additionally, there have been a variety of commercial float builders, who, as of 2025, include Artistic Entertainment Services (AES) and Phoenix Decorating Company. Previous professional builders include Fiesta Parade Floats (1988–2024), Paradiso Parade Floats (2012–2018), and Charisma Floats & Designs (1987–2011).

Anaheim city's float at the 2008 Rose Parade included the Stanley Cup that the NHL's Anaheim Ducks had won in 2007, hoisted by player Brad May. (As the regulations state that the outside of the float must exclusively use organic material, ABC commentators speculated that the city got an exception to display the Cup.) Also, the Los Angeles Dodgers had a float in celebration of the franchise's 50th anniversary in Los Angeles, with Hall of Fame sportscasters Vin Scully and Jaime Jarrin as well as former players Steve Garvey, Fernando Valenzuela, Eric Karros, and Nomar Garciaparra.

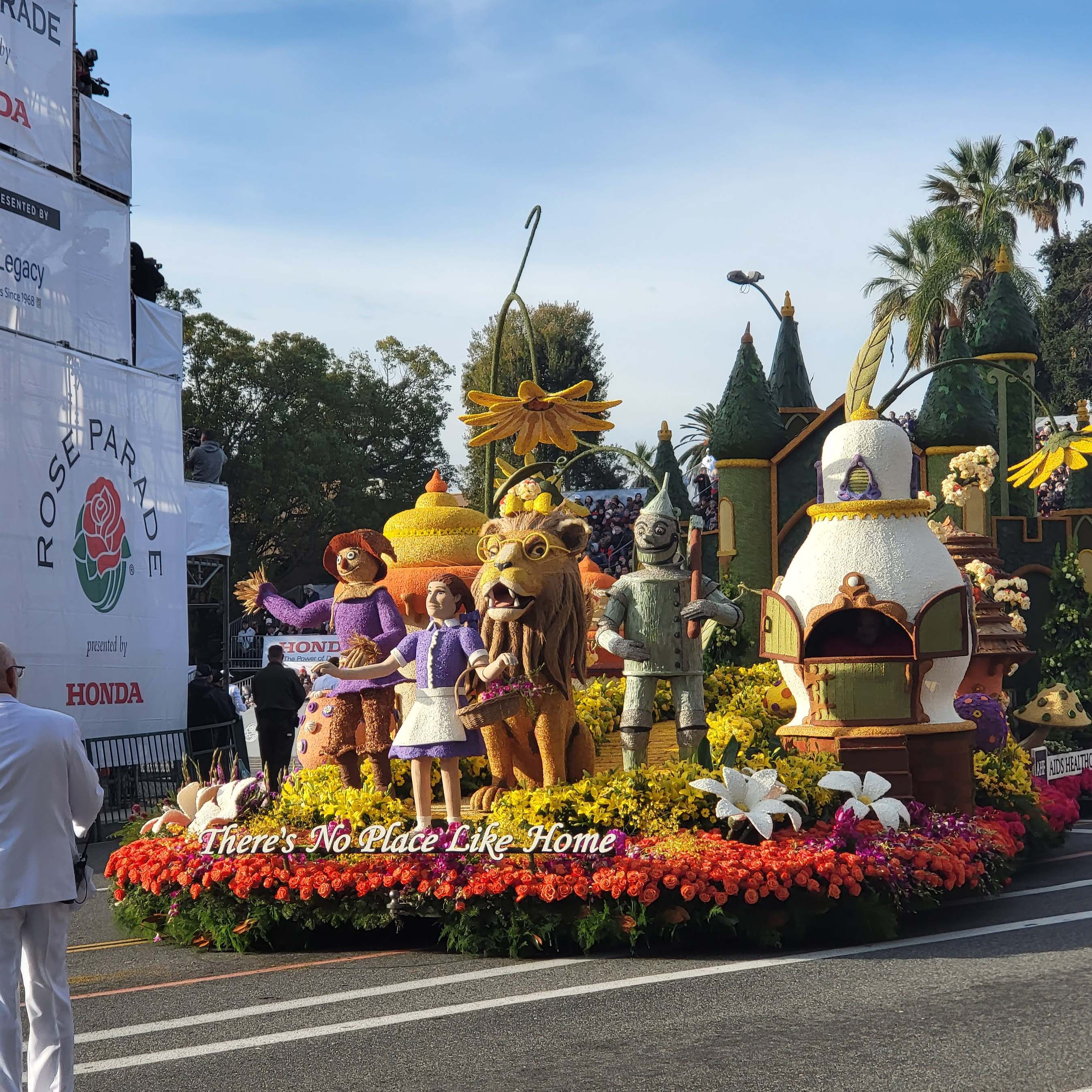
Wizard of Oz float at the 2023 Rose Parade.

The 2010 parade floats included the Boy Scouts of America's 100th Anniversary float, the Consulate General of Mexico in Los Angeles in celebration of Mexico's bicentennial of independence, and "Safety Harbor Kids". The 2010 parade also featured a 113-foot-long (34 m) float from Dick Van Patten's Natural Balance Pet Foods, which set a Guinness world record for the longest single-chassis float. The City of West Covina paid tribute to the "service and commitment of the Tuskegee Airmen" with a float entitled "Tuskegee Airmen – A Cut Above", which featured a large bald eagle, two replica World War II "Redtails" fighter planes, and historical images of some of the airmen who served our country. The float won the Mayor's trophy as the most outstanding city entry – national or international, also Anaheim float featured the 2010 Major League Baseball All-Star Game that was played at Angel Stadium of Anaheim, four former MLB All-Stars, pitchers Mark Langston, Chuck Finley, and Troy Percival, along with second baseman Bobby Grich were aboard.

Since January 1, 2012, fell on a Sunday, tradition dictated that the parade would be held on Monday, January 2, 2012. The 2012 Rose Parade had 43 floats, featuring the Honda float featuring Grammy Award-winning musician Kenny G aboard, the LMU Centennial Celebration float, and the Girl Scouts of the USA 100th Anniversary float (entitled "What Will You Do Today?"). Float builder Fiesta Floats donated their services to the design of the Girl Scouts float, which was decorated by the organization's volunteers (of all ages). Paramount Pictures also participated in the 2012 parade with its centennial celebration float "100 Years of Movie Magic". Namco Bandai Games joined the parade for the first time, commemorating the Power Rangers. Others were Microsoft Kinect ("You are the Controller") and the Kit-Cat Klock ("Timeless Fun for Everyone").

The 2018 Rose Parade was the last parade for the city of Los Angeles after 122 consecutive years sponsoring floats for the Rose Parade. Los Angeles Mayor Eric Garcetti was aboard the float titled "Everyone is Welcome".

== Equestrians ==
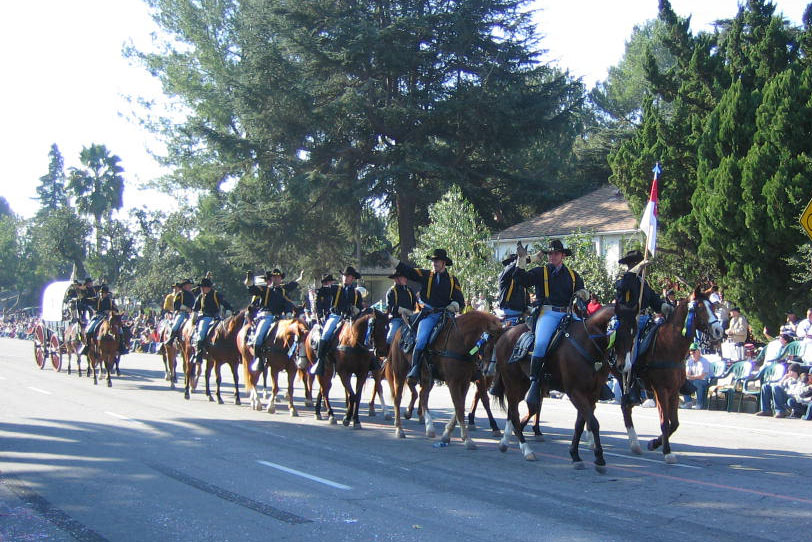
U.S. Army 1st Cavalry Division Equestrian Unit at the 2007 Rose Parade

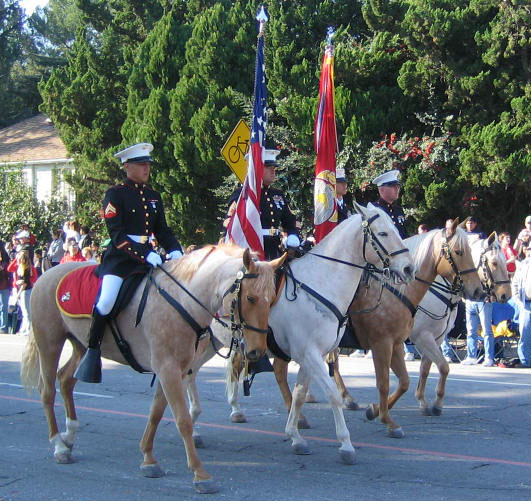
U.S. Marine Corps color guard at the 2007 Rose Parade

Prior to the parade an "Equestfest" is held at the Los Angeles Equestrian Center to showcase the performances by the talented riding teams. Equestrian units taking part in "Equestfest" have included the Clydesdales of the U.S. Army's First Cavalry Division from Fort Hood, "Traveler" (the USC mascot), the Sons and Daughters of the Reel West, and the California State Fire Fighters Association. Bob Eubanks and Shawn Parr have served as announcers at "Equestfest."

Montie Montana was a perennial participant until his death in 1998. TV viewers know him from more than 60 appearances, waving to the crowd from his silver saddle.

== Bands ==
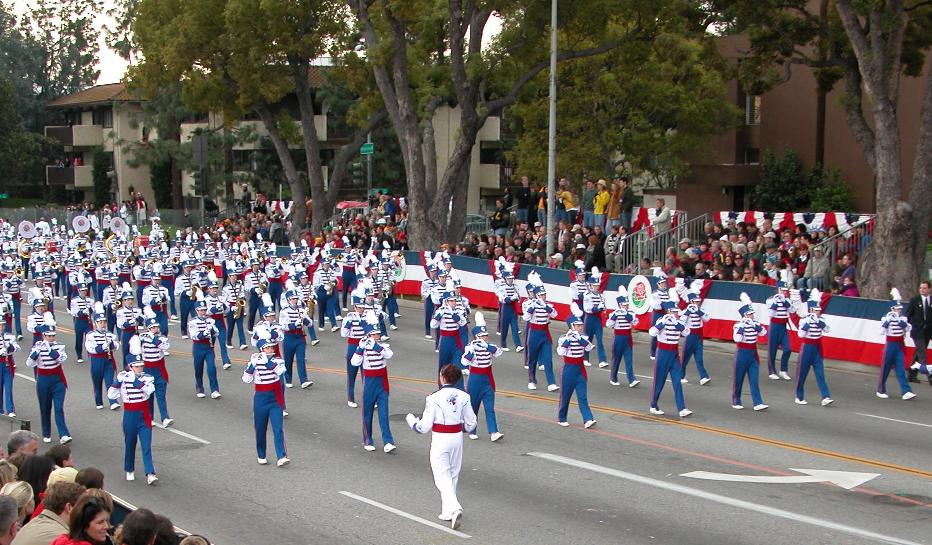
Londonderry High School Marching Lancer Band from New Hampshire during the 2004 parade

Top marching bands from all over the world are invited. Many of the nation's top high school marching bands, along with college and organizational marching bands participate.

The bands participating in the parade have developed traditions throughout its history. For example, Pasadena City College's Tournament of Roses Honor Band always marches in the Rose Parade, along with the Los Angeles Unified School District All City Honor Band, all of whom are selected by audition the previous autumn. Positions in both bands are coveted, and those selected are among the best student musicians in California.

The Tournament of Roses Honor Band's Herald Trumpets unit marches and plays directly before the Rose Queen's float. Nine trumpet players and one snare drummer are selected from those who audition for the band for the unit.

University marching bands from the two schools competing in the Rose Bowl Game are invited to march in the parade. They typically accompany the float that represents the school and conference.

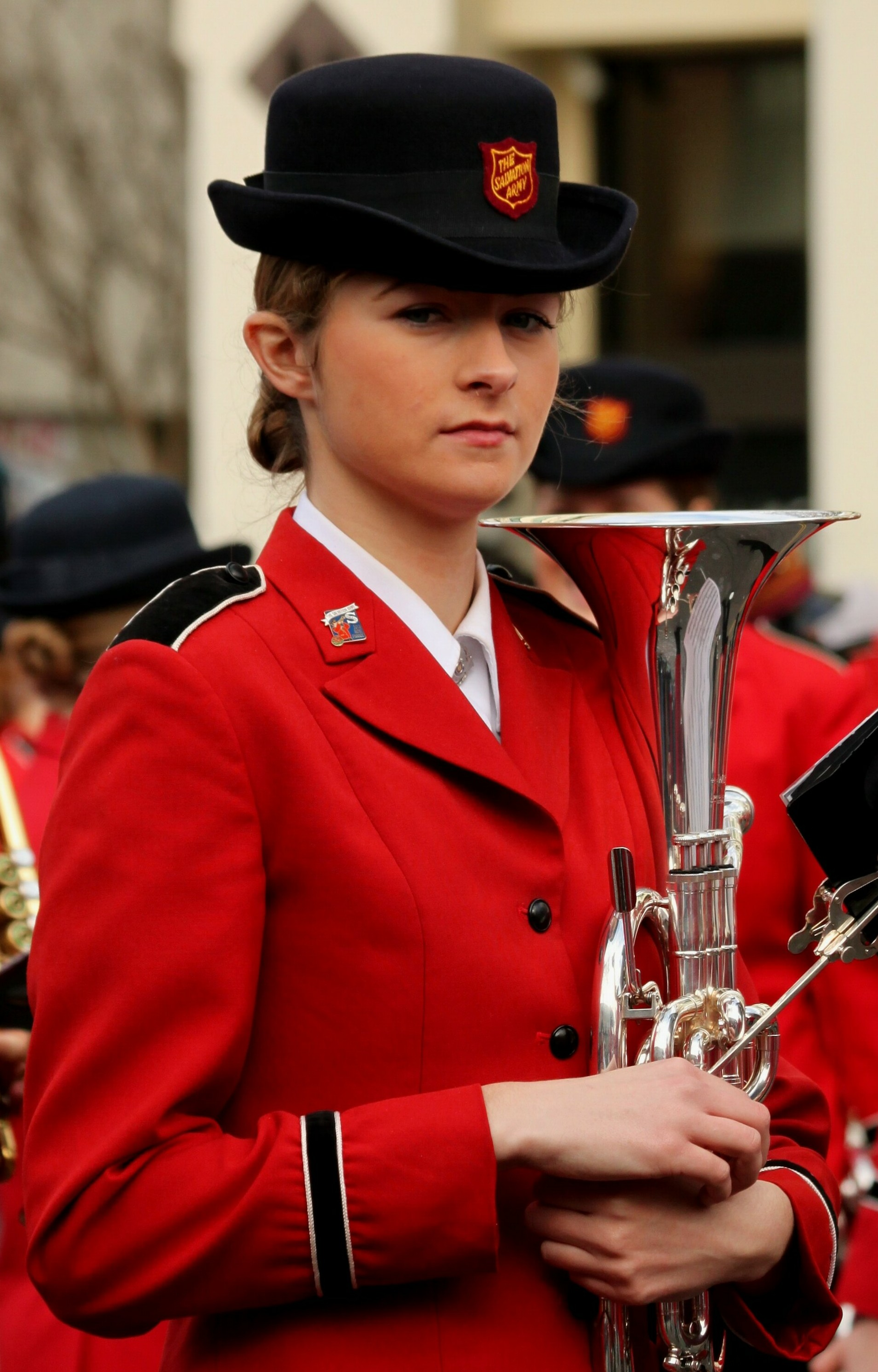
A woman preparing to march with The Salvation Army band, holding an E-flat Tenor horn, 2013

.

Bands that have a long-standing arrangement to be in the parade include:

- The official Tournament of Roses Honor Band hosted by Pasadena City College consisting of members of the college's Lancer Marching Band and talented high school musicians from throughout California (89th Rose Parade appearance in 2018).
- The Los Angeles Unified School District All City Honor Band
- The Salvation Army Tournament of Roses Marching Band consisting of local and visiting Salvation Army musicians (103rd appearance in 2023). The Salvation Army band has performed more than any band in the parade.
- The United States Marine Corps West Coast Composite Band

In 1891, the Monrovia Town Band was the first musical group to perform in the Rose Parade. In 1998, the Washington Township High School Minutemen Marching Band from Sewell, New Jersey became the first band in the history of the Rose Parade to decorate its entire ranks with live flowers, in keeping with the practice of decorating the parade floats. From the neighboring town of Arcadia, the Arcadia High School Apache Marching Band and Colorguard has appeared for 15 years, returning about every four years. The Allen Eagle Escadrille from Allen, Texas had a record breaking 780 members in the 2016 Rose Parade.

In addition to the parade, the bands participate in a two-day, three-show Bandfest at Pasadena City College's Jackie and Mack Robinson Stadium, usually on December 29 and 30 (December 30 and 31 when the parade is on January 2). Number of the bands also perform at other Southern California venues.

== Theme ==
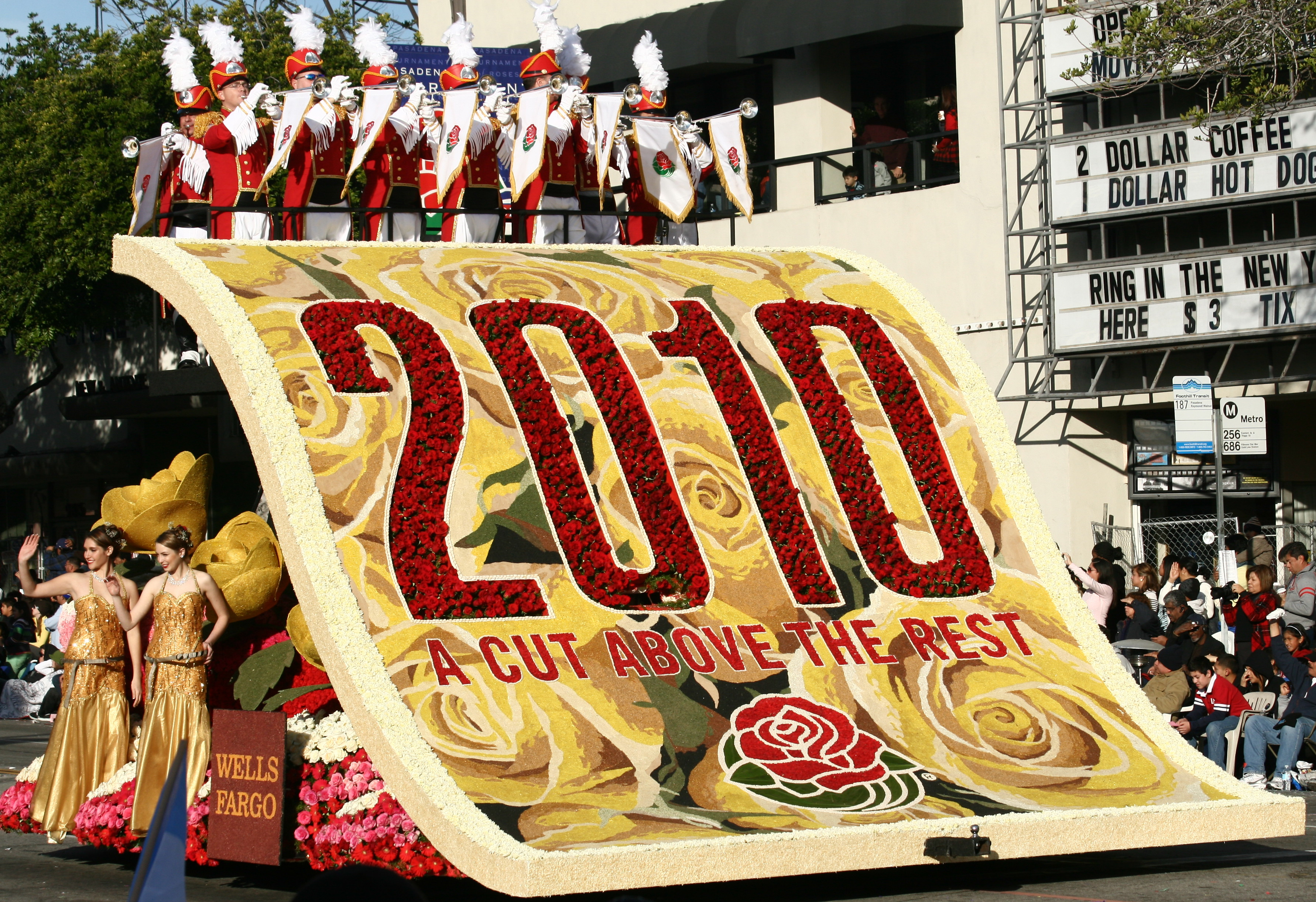
Theme float "2010: A Cut Above the Rest" rolling down Colorado Boulevard during the parade

Shortly after the parade in January, the newly elected President of the Tournament of Roses has the duty of picking a theme for the forthcoming festivities. Most of the floral floats in the parade are inspired by this theme.

On January 19, 2023, Pasadena attorney Alex Aghajanian was confirmed as President of the Pasadena Tournament of Roses Association for 2023–2024. He announced that the theme for the 135th Rose Parade and the 110th Rose Bowl game would be "Celebrating a World of Music: The Universal Language". The Tournament of Roses President will lead the 14-member Executive Committee and the organization of 935 volunteer members for the upcoming year.

=== Themes ===
- 1918 – Patriotism
- 1919 – Victory Tournament
- 1920–1926 – No Themes
- 1927 – Songs in Flowers
- 1928 – States & Nations in Flowers
- 1929 – Poems in Flowers
- 1930 – Festival Days in Flowers
- 1931 – Dreams in Flowers
- 1932 – Nations & Games in Flowers
- 1933 – Fairy Tales in Flowers
- 1934 – Tales of the Seven Seas
- 1935 – Golden Legends
- 1936 – History in Flowers
- 1937 – Romance in Flowers
- 1938 – Playland Fantasies
- 1939 – Golden Memories
- 1940 – 20th Century in Flowers
- 1941 – America in Flowers
- 1942 – The Americas
- 1943 – We're in to Win
- 1944 – Memories of the Past
- 1945 – Hold a Victory so Hardly Won
- 1946 – Victory, Unity and Peace
- 1947 – Holidays in Flowers
- 1948 – Our Golden West
- 1949 – Childhood Memories
- 1950 – Our American Heritage
- 1951 – Joyful Living
- 1952 – Dreams of the Future
- 1953 – Melodies in Flowers
- 1954 – Famous Books in Flowers
- 1955 – Familiar Sayings in Flowers
- 1956 – Pages From the Ages
- 1957 – Famous Firsts in Flowers
- 1958 – Daydreams in Flowers
- 1959 – Adventures in Flowers
- 1960 – Tall Tales and True
- 1961 – Ballads in Blossom
- 1962 – Around the World in Flowers
- 1963 – Memorable Moments
- 1964 – Symbols of Freedom
- 1965 – Headlines in Flowers
- 1966 – It's a Small World
- 1967 – Travel Tales in Flowers
- 1968 – Wonderful World of Adventure
- 1969 – A Time to Remember
- 1970 – Holidays Around the World
- 1971 – Through the Eyes of a Child
- 1972 – The Joy of Music
- 1973 – Movie Memories
- 1974 – Happiness Is ...
- 1975 – Heritage of America
- 1976 – America, Let's Celebrate!
- 1977 – The Good Life
- 1978 – On the Road to Happiness
- 1979 – Our Wonderful, Wonderful World of Sports
- 1980 – Music of America
- 1981 – The Great Outdoors
- 1982 – Friends and Neighbors
- 1983 – Rejoice!
- 1984 – A Salute to the Volunteer
- 1985 – The Spirit of America
- 1986 – A Celebration of Laughter
- 1987 – A World of Wonders
- 1988 – Thanks to Communications
- 1989 – Celebration 100
- 1990 – A World of Harmony
- 1991 – Fun 'n' Games
- 1992 – Voyages of Discovery
- 1993 – Entertainment on Parade
- 1994 – Fantastic Adventure
- 1995 – SPORTS-Quest for Excellence
- 1996 – Kids' Laughter & Dreams
- 1997 – Life's Shining Moments
- 1998 – Hav'n Fun!
- 1999 – Echoes of the Century
- 2000 – Celebration 2000: Visions of the Future
- 2001 – Fabric of America
- 2002 – Good Times
- 2003 – Children's Dreams, Wishes and Imagination
- 2004 – Music Music Music
- 2005 – Celebrate Family
- 2006 – It's Magical
- 2007 – Our Good Nature
- 2008 – Passport to the World's Celebrations
- 2009 – Hats Off! to Entertainment
- 2010 – A Cut Above the Rest
- 2011 – Building Dreams, Friendships & Memories
- 2012 – Just Imagine...
- 2013 – Oh, the Places You'll Go! (based on Dr. Seuss' last book Oh, the Places You'll Go!)
- 2014 – Dreams Come True
- 2015 – Inspiring Stories
- 2016 – Find Your Adventure
- 2017 – Echoes of Success
- 2018 – Making a Difference
- 2019 – The Melody of Life
- 2020 – The Power of Hope
- 2021 – (parade not held in response to COVID-19)
- 2022 – Dream. Believe. Achieve
- 2023 – Turning the Corner
- 2024 – Celebrating a World of Music: The Universal Language
- 2025 – Best Day Ever!
- 2026 – The Magic in Teamwork
- 2027 – Welcome

== Grand marshal ==
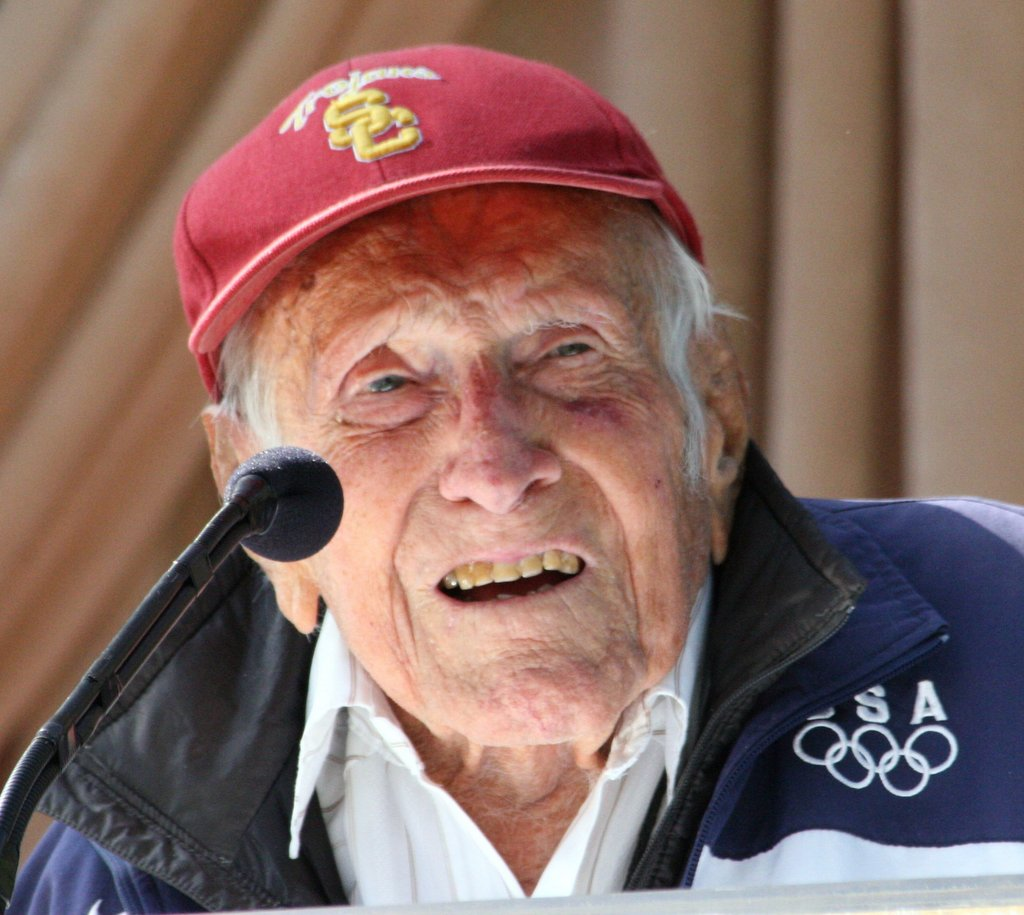
2015 Grand Marshal Louis Zamperini at Tournament House

The Grand Marshal of the parade is an honorary position selected by the president of the Tournament. Many are picked for a relationship to the theme that is also picked by the president. Traditionally, the Grand Marshal of the parade also participates in the Coin Toss during the Rose Bowl.

In October 2025, Earvin "Magic" Johnson was named the 2026 Tournament of Roses Grand Marshal.

As there was no parade in 2021, there was no Grand Marshal that year.

The 2015 parade Grand Marshal was to be Louis Zamperini. After his death on July 2, 2014, the Tournament announced that it was "committed to honoring him as the Grand Marshal of the 2015 Rose Parade." During the parade, USC mascot Traveler walked in his place, riderless to honor Zamperini.

Grand Marshal and actress Cloris Leachman served as the 2009 Grand Marshal, the 10th female grand marshal in the history of the parade. Mary Pickford was the first female Grand Marshal. Other Hollywood celebrities who appeared as Grand Marshal are Leo Carrillo, Harold Lloyd, Walt Disney, John Wayne, George Lucas, and Bob Hope.

Repeat Marshals of the Tournament of Roses Parade

- Shirley Temple (1928–2014), 1939, 1989, 1999
- Charles Daggett, 1900, 1901, 1914
- Dwight D. Eisenhower (1890–1969), 1951, 1964 (note that Cpl. Robert S. Gray filled in for him in 1951)
- Bob Hope (1903–2003), 1947, 1969
- Richard Nixon (1913–1994), 1953, 1960
- C. C. Reynolds, 1902, 1903
- Dr. Francis F. Rowland, 1890, 1892, 1894, 1904, 1905, 1910, 1916
- Dr. Ralph Skillen, 1907, 1908, 1911
- Edwin Stearns, 1896, 1897
- Martin H. Weight, 1898, 1899
- Earl Warren (1891–1974), 1943, 1955

== Rose Queen and Rose Court ==
Each September, some 1,000 young women (and a few young men) between the ages of 17 and 25 interview to serve as a member of the Tournament of Roses Rose Court. The Pasadena Tournament of Roses administers a selection process to determine which greater Pasadena-area young women will have the honor of being crowned Queen of the Tournament of Roses, or more commonly known as "Rose Queen." Six Rose Princesses are selected to make up the Rose Court.

The Rose Court rides on a specially designed float in the Rose Parade and presides over the Rose Bowl Game. The Rose Court attends over one hundred events in the Southern California area as ambassadors of the Tournament of Roses.

Residency for the Rose Queen and Court hopefuls include the Pasadena City College district and starting with the 2025 Rose Parade and thereafter, the cities of Alhambra and San Gabriel and the Los Angeles neighborhoods of Eagle Rock, Highland Park, Monterey Hills and El Sereno, which are served by the Los Angeles Community College District.

One Tree Hill and Chicago P.D. actress Sophia Bush was Rose Queen in 2000. 1997 Rose Princess Lisa Remillard is an anchor with San Diego's KUSI television station. 1990 Rose Princess Inger Miller won an Olympic Gold Medal as part of the 1996 4x100 Relay Team.

The 2015 Rose Queen was Madison Triplett (John Marshall Fundamental High School). Members of the Royal Court were Mackenzie Byers (Pasadena City College), Gabrielle Current (Flintridge Sacred Heart Academy), Veronica Mejia (Pasadena City College), Bergen Onufer (Mayfield Senior School), Simona Shao (Westridge School) and Emily Stoker (Temple City High School).

The 2016 Rose Queen was Erika Karen Winter (Flintridge Preparatory School). Members of the Royal Court were Natalie Breanne Hernandez-Barber (Alverno High School), Donaly Elizabeth Marquez (Blair International Baccalaureate School), Bryce Marie Bakewell (Flintridge Sacred Heart Academy), Rachelle Liu (San Marino High School), Regina Pullens (Maranatha High School), and Sarah Shaklan (La Canada High School).

The 2017 Rose Queen was Victoria "Tori" Castellanos (Temple City High School).

Isabella Marez of La Salle High School was crowned as the 100th Tournament of Roses Queen on October 18, 2017. Other members of the 2018 Royal Court: Julianne Lauenstein (La Cañada High School); Sydney Pickering (Arcadia High School); Savannah Bradley (Pasadena High School); Georgia Cervenka (La Cañada High School); Lauren Buehner (Arcadia High School); Alexandra Artura (Flintridge Sacred Heart Academy).

The 2019 Royal Court consisted of Louise Siskel, Rucha Kadam, Helen Rossi, Lauren Baydaline, Sherry Ma, Ashley Hackett, and Micaele McElrath.

As there was no parade in 2021 due to the COVID-19 pandemic, there was no Rose Queen crowned for that year. Before that, the last time that a Rose Queen was not crowned was 1929.

The Royal Court for the 2022 Rose Parade was announced on October 4, 2021, by Dr. Robert Miller, the president of the Tournament of Roses Association. They are: Jeannine Briggs (John Marshall Fundamental High School), Nadia Chung (La Cañada High School), Ava Feldman (South Pasadena High School), Abigail Griffith (Pasadena High School), Swetha Somasundaram (Arcadia High School), McKenzie Street (Flintridge Sacred Heart Academy), and Jaeda Walden (La Cañada High School). The coronation of the new queen was held on October 26, 2021. Nadia Chung was named as the 2022 Rose Queen.

The 2022 Rose Queen is required to have been vaccinated against COVID-19.

The 2023 Rose Court was announced on October 3 and consisted of: Salia Baligh, Uma Wittenberg, Adrian Crick, Sahanna Rajinikanthan, Bella Ballard, Zoe Denoncourt, Michelle Cortez-Peralta

The 2025 Rose Court consisted of: Rose Queen Lindsay Charles (Westridge School), Princess Simone Ball (Arcadia High School), Princess Saniyah Brunston (John Muir High School), Princess Lara Georgian (Mayfield Senior School), Princess Kate Kelly (La Canada High School), Princess Lisette Parker (Maranatha High School), and Princess Natalia Pradhan (Flintridge Preparatory School).

The 2026 Rose Court was announced on September 29 and consists of: Rose Queen Serena Hui Guo (Arcadia High School), Princess Naira Elaine Wadley (John Muir High School), Princess Sophia Bai Ren (Arcadia High School); Princess Olivia Hargrove (Pasadena City College); Princess Keiko Rakin (Alhambra High School); Princess Riya Gupta (California Institute of Technology); and Princess Livia Amy de Paula (Temple City High School).

== Attendance ==
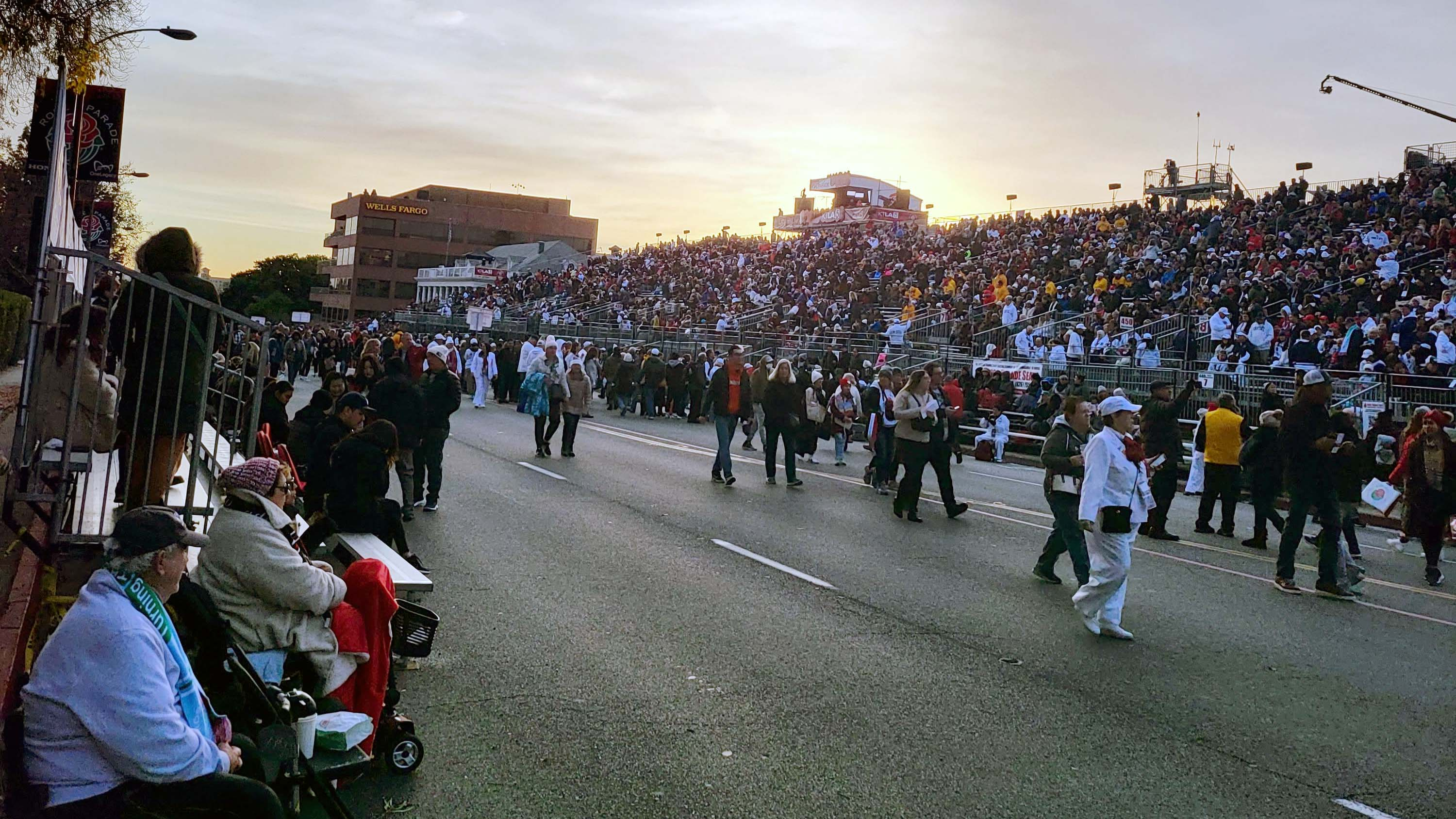
Spectators at the 2023 Rose Parade

More recent attendance figures are followed by the TV and predicted attendance in parentheses. Most estimates are conducted by the Tournament of Roses and the Pasadena Police Department. A number of studies were conducted by the Anderson School of Management at UCLA on attendance and economic impact to Southern California. The attendance figures were the subject of controversy in 1980, after the Pasadena police claimed that over 1.4 million people attended the parade, while other estimates published in the Pasadena Star-News and the Los Angeles Times determined that the available space for spectators physically could not accommodate more than 500,000 people.

- 1890 – 2,000
- 2002 – 800,000 (1,000,000; drop blamed on the September 11 attacks)
- 2004 – 1,000,000
- 2009 – 700,000 (Pasadena had 1,000,000 visitors during the week of the parade)
- 2011 – 700,000
- 2012 – 700,000 (with an estimated 70 million watching worldwide on television)
- 2013 – 700,000
- 2022 – 700,000
- 2024 – (750,000)

== Broadcast ==
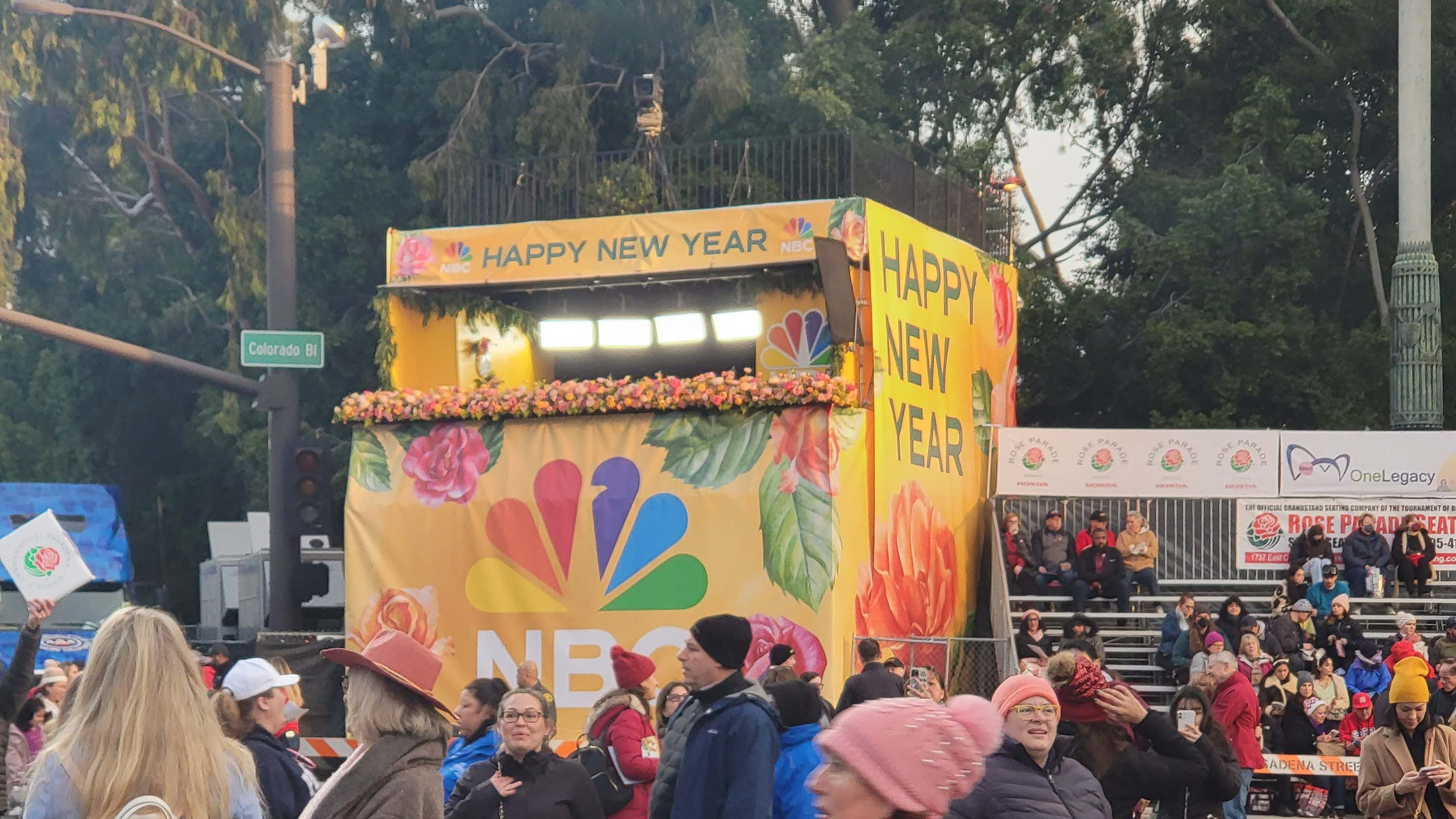
The NBC broadcast booth at the 2023 Rose Parade.

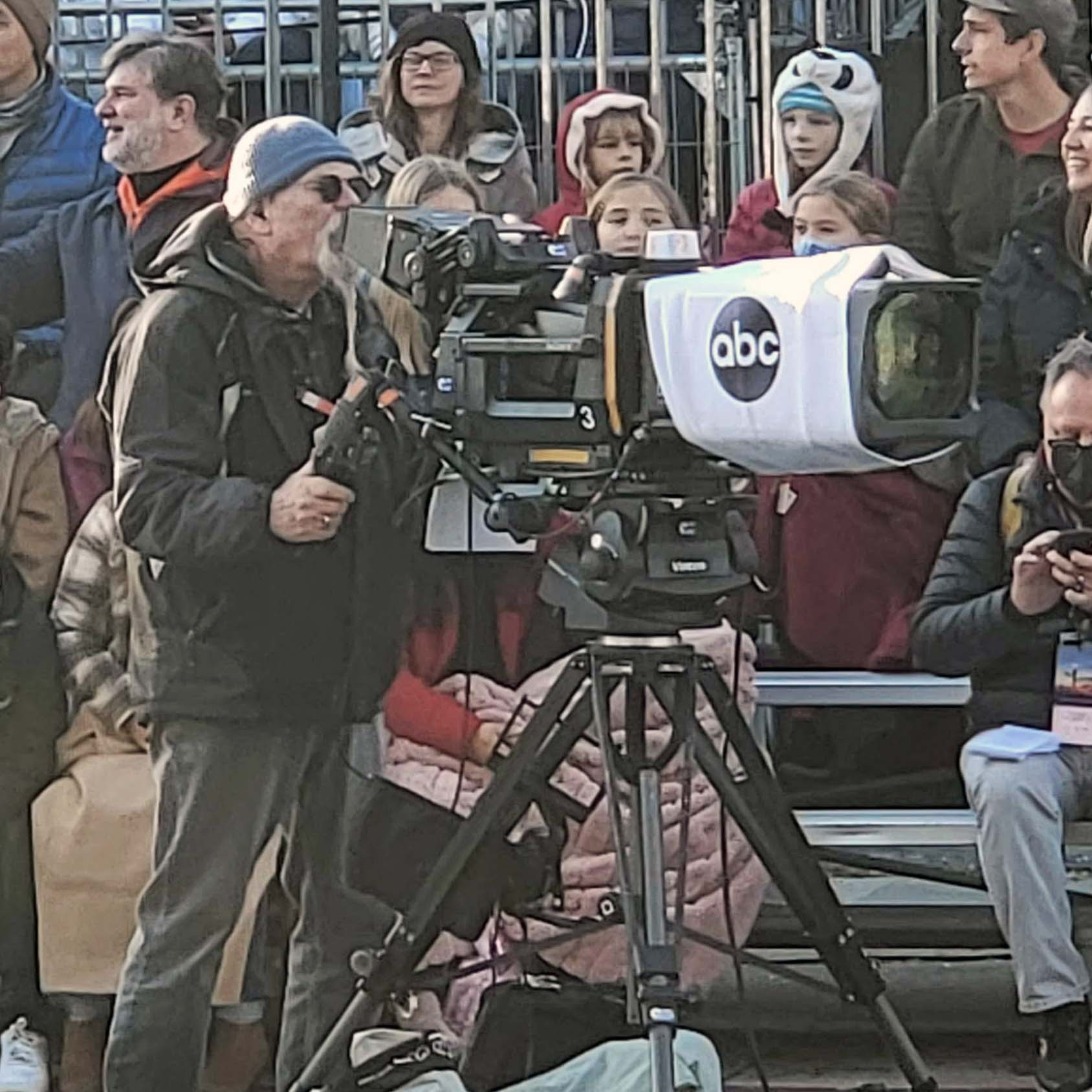
A cameraman for ESPN/ABC at the 2023 Rose Parade.

The Rose Parade is televised on ESPN/ABC, CNN, Fox, NBC, Telemundo, Univision, HGTV, Sky Link TV (in Mandarin and Cantonese), Hallmark Channel, RFD TV, and KTLA. The latter three offer interruption-free coverage. KTLA repeats the parade throughout the day with commercials. Since 2020, the parade has been livestreamed on its YouTube page.

WGN-TV in Chicago carried KTLA's uninterrupted coverage of the 2009 parade. WGN and KTLA have historically been sister stations via former owner Tribune Media. Both are now owned by Nexstar Media Group. Until 2005, the parade was broadcast on CBS. KTTV televised the parade from the station's sign-on in 1949 until 1995. Through ESPN's ownership of the rights to the Rose Bowl Game, ESPN/ABC serves as the de facto official broadcaster of the parade.

- The 1947 parade was the first to be televised, on KTLA. Reportedly experimental station W6XAO, now KCBS-TV, broadcast the 1940 parade.
- The 1954 parade was also the first program televised in the NTSC color television format nationwide on NBC.
- The 1967 parade was broadcast for the first time in Spanish on KMEX-DT to the Los Angeles area.
- The 1987 parade was broadcast in Spanish on Univision nationwide.
- The 1985 parade was nominated for the Daytime Emmy Award Outstanding Special Class Program, with the producers at CBS, as well as co-hosts Bob Barker and Joan Van Ark, attached as the potential recipients if the broadcast had won.
- The 1989 parade was broadcast in 3D on KTTV.
- The 1999 parade was first broadcast in high definition television (HDTV) on KTLA.
- The 2004 parade was first time aired in Chinese Mandarin language on Chinese TV station: Sky Link TV.
- The 2009 Parade was broadcast to 217 countries (79 countries live) in over 20 languages.
- The Tournament of Roses website had approximately 13 million hits during the week of the 2009 parade.
- The website was viewed in 150 countries.
- The 2010 Parade was watched via TV in 127 countries including China.
- The 2011 Parade had a total television reach of approximately 47 million television viewers in the U.S. and was seen by approximately 28 million viewers internationally.
- The 2013 Parade was also streamed on Xbox Live via both their WatchESPN (U.S.) and Live Event Player (all other countries) applications.
- In 2018 and 2019, Funny or Die partnered with Amazon Video to produce a comedic broadcast of the parade, starring Will Ferrell and Molly Shannon as the characters of Cord Hosenbeck and Tish Cattigan—who were claimed to have been local newscasters for 25 years. The 2018 broadcast was nominated at the WGA Awards for Best Comedy/Variety Special.
- Farm broadcaster Orion Samuelson served as RFD-TV's host for their parade coverage through his retirement in 2020.
- Since there was no parade in 2021, a TV special Rose Parade's New Year Celebration presented by Honda was aired, including highlights from past parades.
- The official Rose Parade YouTube channel debuted its own livestream of the parade for 2024, countering with KTLA's simulcast.
- 10.5 million viewers watched the Rose Parade on NBC and ABC in 2024, with the two networks roughly equally dividing the audience. Combined, the audience ranked in fifth place among television specials in 2024.
- The 2026 parade was broadcast for the first time in Spanish on Telemundo nationwide. Partner with main channel NBC.

== Volunteers ==
=== Leadership ===
Each year, the newly elected Tournament of Roses President is responsible for selecting the year's theme and grand marshal. Preparation and construction of the floral floats theoretically begins after the theme is announced. The selection of marching bands is already well under way except for Rose Bowl Game college bands. In 2005, Libby Evans Wright was elected as the first female president of the Association.

In 2010, the Pasadena Tournament of Roses appointed former Los Angeles Times executive P. Scott McKibben as its executive director, replacing John M. (Mitch) Dorger, who had served as CEO since 2000. In September 2011, he resigned for personal reasons. Chief Operating Officer William B. Flinn was named interim executive director. From March 2012, to January 2017, William B. Flinn took over the role of Executive Director. David Eads became the Executive Director in 2017.

=== Operations and the parade ===
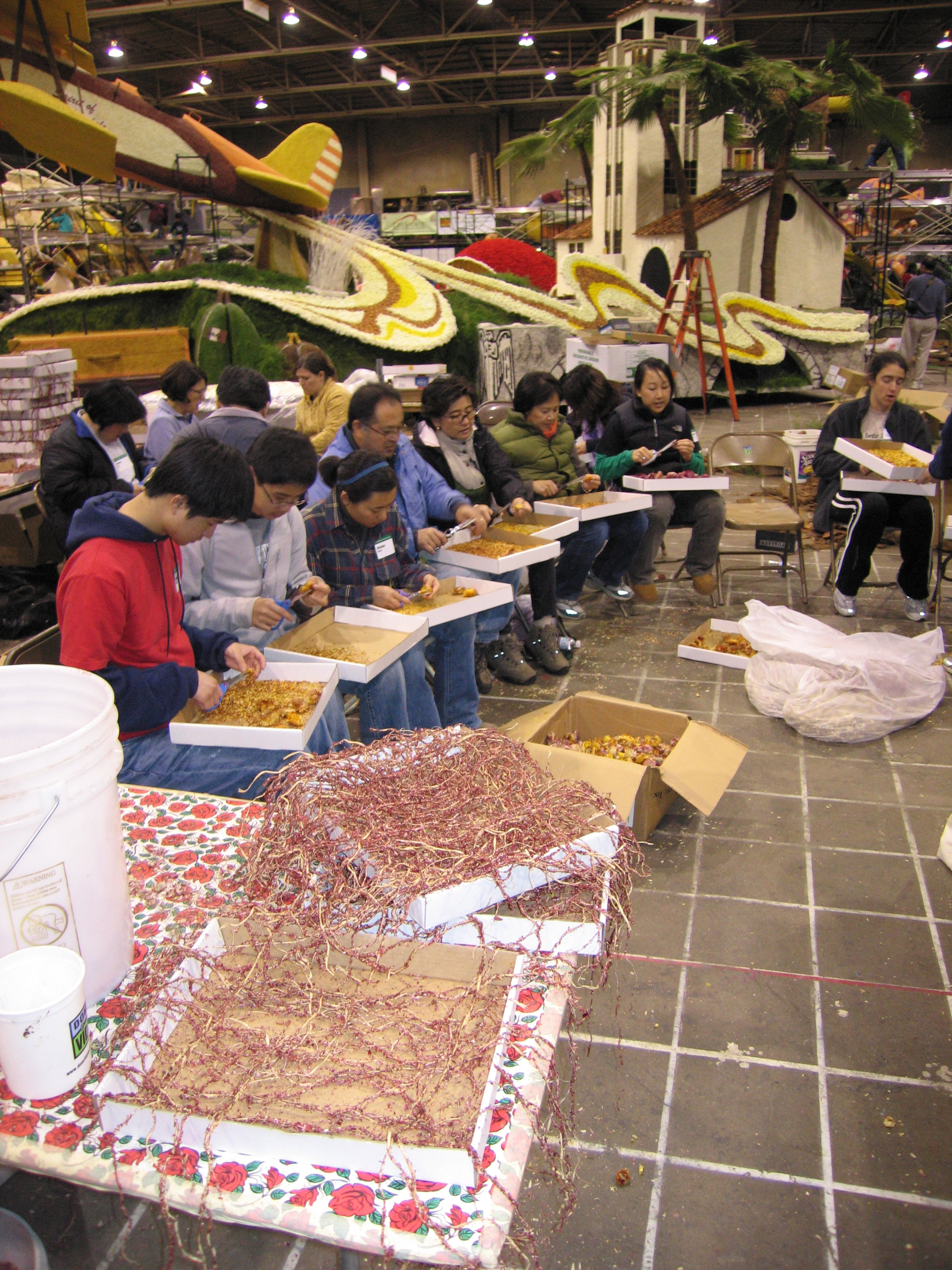
Volunteers

The Tournament of Roses has become such a large event that it requires 65,000 hours of combined manpower each year, or the equivalent of roughly 7.42 years of combined manpower. The group has 935 members, each of whom is assigned to one of 34 committees, and around 50 student ambassadors. Responsibilities include:

- Selecting Parade participants
- Inspecting and testing floats for safe and reliable operation
- Assembling the parade elements
- Conducting the parade through the streets of Pasadena
- Directing visitors on New Year's Day
- Assisting the public and the media in viewing the parade
- Giving presentations about the Tournament to community groups
- Supervising elements of the Rose Bowl Game (and also the BCS National Championship Game when held in Pasadena)

During the Parade, many Tournament members are required to wear white suits with red ties, name tags, membership pins and official ribbons. Because of this, the volunteers are commonly referred to as "White Suiters." In December each year, a fleet of white vehicles with special "ToR" license plates are seen throughout the San Gabriel Valley. The use of these cars is currently donated by American Honda for use by high-ranking Tournament members.

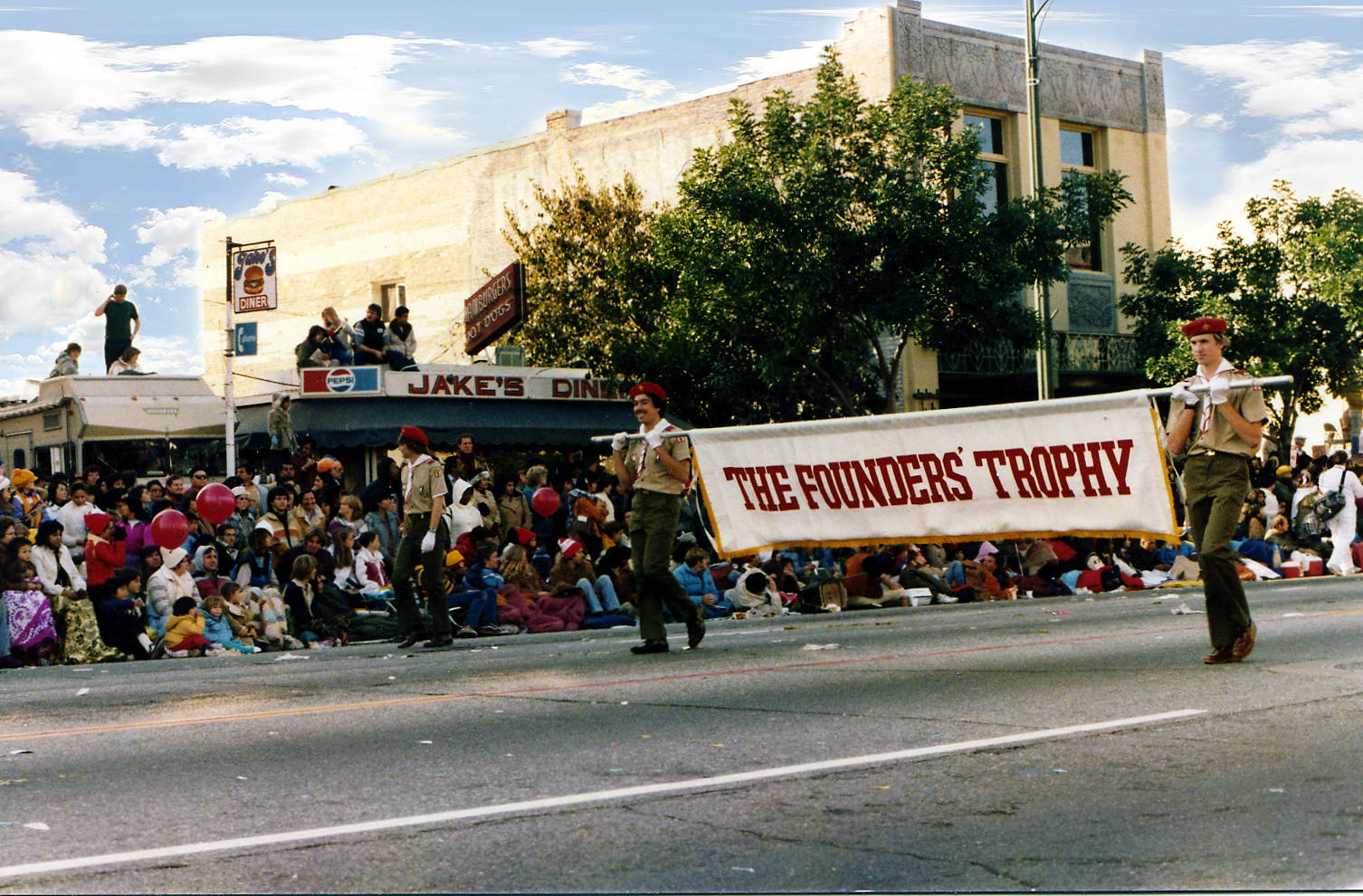
Eagle Scouts carrying banner

Each year, an honor troop of Eagle Scouts from the San Gabriel Valley Council, (now GLAAC), and "The Tournament Troop" of Girl Scout Gold Award recipients of the Arcadia Service Unit of the Girl Scouts Greater Los Angeles, is selected to carry the parade banners down the route. Each year, for the last 35 years, more than 100 scouts have participated.

The Tournament of Roses Radio Amateurs (TORRA) provided audio communications and video co-ordination for the parade officials through the use of Amateur radio from 1968 until 2005. With over 300 ham radio operators in TORRA there were several ham radio sites along the parade route equipped with amateur television as well as 2-way ham radios. Several mobile units – including motorcycles and pedestrian units (creepie-peepies) provided the video coverage. With modern technology and cell phone service, TORRA was no longer needed.

Thousands more volunteers help cover the floats in flower and seed mixes during "Deco week," which is December 26 to the parade day. Many of these come back year after year, some even camp nearby to help all week long.

== Weather ==
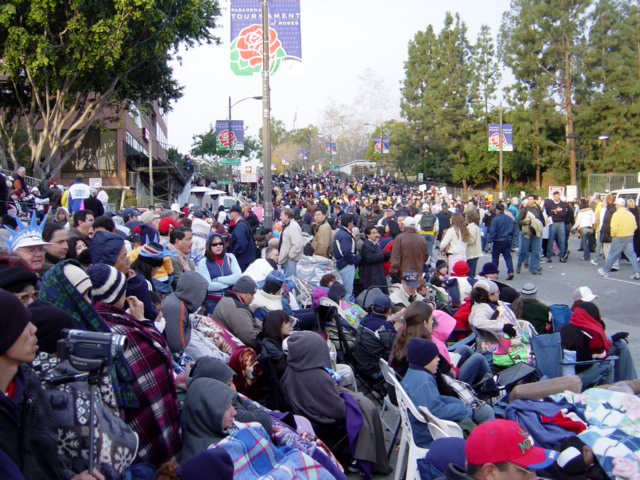
Spectators gather before the 2004 Rose Parade: some pay for seats in stands; others spend the night to "reserve" a free spot on the sidewalks.

For the 2006 Tournament of Roses Parade on January 2 (it is always held on January 2 when January 1 falls on a Sunday) winds with gusts up to 45 mph (72 km/h) and five inches (130 mm) of rain in the Pasadena area were predicted. The forecast proved accurate, ruining the 51 year record of good weather for the parade. It rained continuously and heavily throughout the entire 2006 parade.

The President of the Tournament, the Grand Marshal of the Parade and the executive committee, deliberated into the early morning at the Tournament House. With street rumors circulating of the parade being canceled or postponed, and restlessness of the crowd further east along the parade route, the parade got underway despite the bleak weather. Low television ratings and poor attendance plagued the ceremony. Some floats sustained water damage by the end of the parade.

The 2026 parade had the first rain in 20 years, marking the eleventh time there had been wet weather. More than an inch of rain had fallen in the 12 hours preceding the parade's end. The temperature at the start of the parade was 58 degrees.

== The "Never on Sunday" rule ==
The 1893 parade was the first parade to fall on a Sunday. The parade organizers decided that the parade might spook the horses outside of the churches along the parade route and disrupt the services. The "Never on Sunday" rule was instituted and has been in place ever since: if January 1 falls on a Sunday, the parade is shifted to the 2nd.

There are conflicting reports on the number of times this has happened. Several articles say that 2017 (the latest occurrence) was the 15th time.

However, the correct answer seems to be that the 2023 parade was the 20th time this has happened with the years being 1893, 1899, 1905, 1911, 1922, 1928, 1933, 1939, 1950, 1956, 1961, 1967, 1978, 1984, 1989, 1995, 2006, 2012, 2017, and 2023.

== Related events ==
- Grand Marshal announcement
- Rose Court Interviews
- Royal Ball
- Rose Queen Announcement and Coronation Ceremony
- Selection Sunday
- Rose Bowl game teams' Welcome Day, Disneyland Resort
- Lawry's Beef Bowl (discontinued in 2024)
- Decorating Places (for float viewing), various "barns"
- Equestfest, Los Angeles Equestrian Center
- Bandfest, Pasadena City College
- Rose Bowl Hall of Fame Ceremony, Rose Bowl
- Rose Bowl Game Public Tailgate
- Rose Bowl Game
- Floatfest (for float viewing), also known as Post Parade, Washington and Sierra Madre Boulevards, adjacent to Pasadena High School

== Notes ==
- January 1, 1942 – First parade cancellation, caused by World War II
- January 1, 1943 – Second parade cancellation, caused by World War II
- January 1, 1945 – Third parade cancellation, caused by World War II
- January 3, 2002 – Tournament of Roses hosted the first BCS National Championship where Miami defeated Nebraska, 37–14, and the Parade and the Rose Bowl Game were held on separate days.
- The animated 2007 film Bee Movie featured the Tournament of Roses.
- January 1, 2014 – The first same-sex marriage at the parade was held, for Aubrey Loots and Danny LeClair.
- January 1, 2019 – The parade was delayed near the end of the two-hour broadcast by NBC and ABC when the float commemorating the 150th anniversary of the First transcontinental railroad with the placing of the Golden Spike, entitled "Harmony Through Union", suffered a minor fire and blocked the parade route. The volunteers on board were able to evacuate safely, and the float was secured by LASD deputies and Pasadena police until it could be moved to allow the parade to resume, being able to still finish the parade while being towed.
- January 1, 2021 – Fourth parade cancellation, in response to the COVID-19 pandemic. First cancellation in 76 years.
- January 2, 2023 – Singer Tanya Tucker performed "Ready as I'll Never Be" as the parade's grand finale.
- January 1, 2026 – Cal Poly Universities' float Jungle Jumpstart became the first self-built float to win the Sweepstakes Trophy
