= Tournament of Roses Honor Band =

Marching band

Pasadena City College Tournament of Roses Honor Band
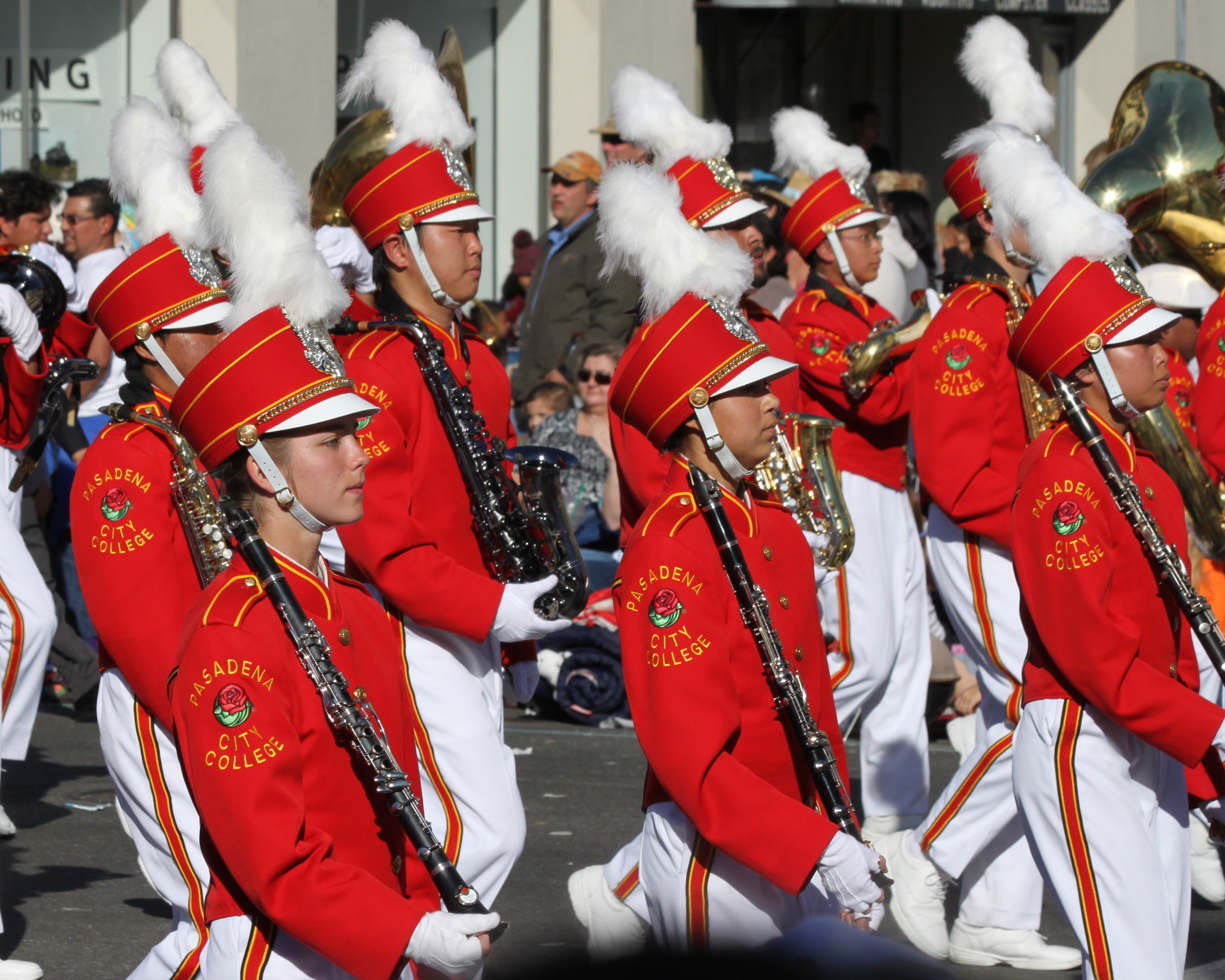
- School: Pasadena City College
- Location: Pasadena, California
- Conference: Orange Empire Conference
- Founded: 1930
- Director: Dr. Peter Huerta
- Assistant Director: Jack Taylor
- Members: 230+
- Website: pccband.com/tofr

The Tournament of Roses Honor Band is an honor marching band hosted by the band of Pasadena City College. The band consists of hand selected high school students from all over Southern California, and select Pasadena City College Marching Band and Color Guard members. The ensemble consists of about 230 members. The PCC Band has marched in every Rose Parade since 1930 and is one of four bands, along with the two Rose Bowl university bands, that performs every year.

== Members ==
The band consists of hand selected high school students from all over California. Tha other members are selected from the Pasadena City College Lancer Marching Band. The band has about 230 members.

== Performances ==
The Honor Band performs at the Disneyland Resort, Bandfest, and the Pasadena Tournament of Roses Parade.
