= List of settlements in Chalkidiki =

This is a list of settlements in Chalkidiki, Greece.

- Afytos
- Agia Paraskevi
- Agios Mamas
- Agios Nikolaos
- Agios Panteleimonas
- Agios Pavlos
- Agios Prodromos
- Ammouliani
- Arnaia
- Chaniotis
- Dionysiou
- Doumpia
- Elaiochoria
- Flogita
- Fourka
- Galarinos
- Galatista
- Geroplatanos
- Gomati
- Ierissos
- Kalandra
- Kallithea
- Kalyves
- Kassandreia
- Kassandrino
- Krimni
- Krini
- Kryopigi
- Lakkoma
- Marathoussa
- Megali Panagia
- Metagkitsi
- Metamorfosi
- Nea Fokaia
- Nea Gonia
- Kallikrateia
- Nea Moudania
- Nea Plagia
- Nea Poteidaia
- Nea Roda
- Nea Silata
- Nea Skioni
- Nea Tenedos
- Nea Triglia
- Neochori
- Neos Marmaras
- Nikiti
- Olympiada
- Olynthos
- Ormylia
- Ouranoupoli
- Palaiochora
- Palaiochori
- Palaiokastro
- Paliouri
- Pefkochori
- Petralona
- Polychrono
- Polygyros
- Portaria
- Psakoudia
- Pyrgadikia also known in the ancient world as Piloros
- Riza
- Sana
- Sarti
- Simantra
- Stagira
- Stanos
- Stratoni
- Stratoniki
- Sykia
- Taxiarchis
- Vardos
- Varvara
- Vrastama
- Yerakini
- Zografou

== See also ==
- List of towns and villages in Greece
