= Neapolis (Chalcidice) =

Ancient Greek city

Coordinates: 40°01′02″N 23°31′45″E

Neapolis (Ancient Greek: Νεάπολις) meaning "New City", was an ancient city on east coast of the isthmus the Pallene, Chalcidice, ancient Greece between Aphytis and Aege. It was a member of the Delian League.

It is usually identified with the modern town of Polychrono, in Pallini municipality, Chalkidiki prefecture.

== See also ==
- List of ancient Greek cities
