= Mende (Chalcidice) =

Ancient Greek city

Coordinates: 39.9747°N 23.4006°E

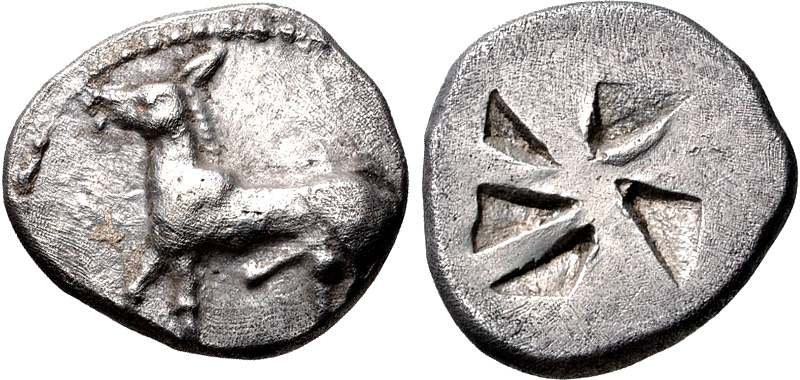
Coinage of Mende. Ithyphallic ass on the obverse. c. 510-480 BC.

Mende (Ancient Greek: Μένδη), also Mendae or Mendai (Μένδαι), or Menda (Μένδα), or Mendis, was an ancient Greek city located on the western coast of the Pallene peninsula in Chalkidiki, facing the coast of Pieria across the narrow Thermaic Gulf and near the modern town of Kalandra.

== History ==
Map of the Delian League (Athenian Empire) showing Mende.

Coin from Mende depicting Silenus
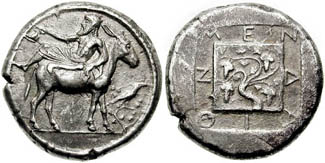
First side of the image: Obv: Inebriated Silenus reclining on a donkey, holding kantharos with wine
Second side of the image: Rev: Vine of four grape clusters within shallow linear incuse square, MENΔAIΩN, of Mendians
Silver tetradrachm from Mende, 460–423 BC

Mende was probably built during the 9th century BC by Eretrian colonists. The city owes its name to the minthe plant, a species of mint that still sprouts in the area. Mende's abundant lumber resources and possession of silver, gold and lead mines led to its rapid development. From the 6th century BC, it was one of the cities that controlled trade routes along the coast of Thrace; there were even confirmed dealings with the Greek colonies in Italy, especially concerning the export of the famous local wine Mendaeos oinos.

During the 5th century BC, Mende became one of the most important allies of Athens and joined the Delian League, paying a tax that varied from six up to fifteen Attic talents per year. However, in 423 BC, it managed to revolt against Athenian rule, a situation that did not last long as the Athenians quickly suppressed the revolt (Thuc. iv. 121). During the Peloponnesian War, Mende, Toroni and Skione were the main regional goals of the two combatants, Athens and Sparta, specially after Brasidas, the Spartan general, raised an army of allies and helots and went for the sources of Athenian power in north Greece in 424. After the end of the war, Mende regained its independence.

The city tried to avoid Olynthian rule in the 4th century BC, when the Chalkidician League was established; later it tried to avoid rule by the Macedonian hegemony, but in 315 its population, along with other Chalkidicians, was forced to resettle in Cassandreia, after this new city was built by king Cassander on the site of the former town of Poteidaea.

The sculptor Paeonius, who made the statue of Nike that was put on top of the victory pillar in Olympia – and is shown in the Archaeological Museum of Olympia – was born in Mende.

The Antimoerus was an ancient Greek sophist from Mende.

== Topography and archaeology ==
The location of Mende was identified with the area of the modern town of Kalandra by William Martin Leake in 1835. Systematic excavational research was conducted from 1986 to 1994 by the XVI Ephorate of Classical Antiquities.

The main archaeological area covers an area of 1,200 metres (1,300 yd) by 600 metres (660 yd) and lies to the open and flat place of a hill by the sea. It was continuously inhabited from the 9th to the 4th century. The acropolis of the city is located to the south uppermost point of the hill, where large storage buildings among with pottery dated from the 11th to the 4th century, were found.

The Proasteion (Suburb) of the city, which is also mentioned by Thucydides, occupied the waterfront area between the beach and the hill of the main city, where the harbour was located. Excavations revealed part of the main avenue, paved with pebbles, along with foundations of buildings with storage pottery, possibly shops or harbour buildings.

The settlement's Necropolis was found south of the city, near a modern hotel. Excavations were made in 241 tombs that mainly revealed burials of children inside engraved ceramic vases.

Those excavations are considered important mainly because they proved that a heavy Euboean influenced settlement was established already from the 11th century.

== See also ==
- Olynthus
