= Agia Paraskevi, Chalkidiki =

Agia Paraskevi Αγία Παρασκευή
- Community
- Location within Greece
- Coordinates: 39°57′N 23°36′E
- Country: Greece
- Administrative region: Central Macedonia
- Regional unit: Chalkidiki
- Municipality: Kassandra
- Municipal unit: Pallini

Population (2021)
  - Community: 360
- Time zone: UTC+2 (EET)
  - Summer (DST): UTC+3 (EEST)
- Postal code: 630 85
- Area code: 2374
- Vehicle registration: ΧΚ

Agia Paraskevi (Greek: Αγία Παρασκευή, IPA: [aˈʝia paraskeˈvi]) is a village located in the southeast of the peninsula of Kassandra, in Chalkidiki, northern Greece. The population of the community of Agia Paraskevi, which includes the village Loutra, was 360 in 2021. It is located 4 km south of Pefkochori, 5 km west Paliouri, 7 km east of Nea Skioni and about 100 km southeast of Thessaloniki.

== Population ==
Year	Village population	Community population
1981	-	457
1991	379	-
2001	361	449
2011	294	375
2021	300	360

== See also ==
- List of settlements in Chalkidiki
