= Pallene =

Pallene can refer to:

- Pallene (mythology), one of the seven Alkyonides, daughters of the giant Alkyoneus in Greek mythology
- Pallene (moon), a small moon of Saturn, discovered in 2004
- Pallene (Attica), a deme of ancient Attica, Greece
- Pallini, a town east of Athens, Greece
- Pallene, Chalcidice, the westernmost headland of the Chalcidice, Greece, also called Kassandra
  - Pallini, Chalcidice, a municipality in the above

== See also ==
- Pellene, a city and polis of ancient Achaea
