= Therambos =

Ancient town in Chalcidice, Greece

Coordinates: 39°56′31″N 23°39′45″E

Therambos (Ancient Greek: Θεράμβως), or Thrambos or Thrambus (Θράμβος), was a town of the Pallene peninsula, in Chalcidice in ancient Macedonia. During the Second Persian invasion of Greece, when the Xerxes's army arrived in the region, it provided men and ships to the Persian army. Later, it became a member of the Delian League, as its name appears in tribute lists from 454/3 to 429/8 BCE.

The site of Therambos is near the modern Paliouri.
