= Krini =

Krini may refer to:

- Krini, Aigialeia, a village in the municipality of Aigialeia, Achaea, Greece
- Krini, Corfu, a small village
- Krini, Cyprus, Northern Cyprus, a village near Kyrenia
- Krini, Greece, a small village in northern Greece
- Krini, Patras, a village in the municipality of Patras, Achaea, Greece
- Krini, Trikala, a town in Greece
- Çeşme, a town in Turkey (traditional Greek name Krini)
