= Kallithea, Chalkidiki =

Village in Central Macedonia, Greece

Kallithea Καλλιθέα
- Community
- Location within Greece
- Coordinates: 40.074722°N 23.448611°E
- Country: Greece
- Administrative region: Central Macedonia
- Regional unit: Chalkidiki
- Municipality: Kassandra
- Municipal unit: Kassandra
- Village established: 1925 (101 years ago)

Population (2021)
  - Community: 1,236
- Time zone: UTC+2 (EET)
  - Summer (DST): UTC+3 (EEST)

Kallithea (Greek: Καλλιθέα) is a village and a community in the municipality of Kassandra, northern Greece. It is located in the regional unit of Chalkidiki. It has a population of 1,236 inhabitants according to the 2021 census.

== History ==
=== Toponymy ===
The name Kallithea (Greek: Καλλιθέα) is derived from the Greek words kallos (κάλλος, "beauty") and thea (θέα, "view"), meaning "beautiful view". This name reflects the village's scenic location on the eastern coast of the Kassandra Peninsula in Halkidiki.

=== Ancient Era ===
Kallithea is notable for its archaeological remains, particularly those associated with ancient religious worship. A sanctuary dedicated to Dionysus and the Nymphs has been excavated. Dionysus was the Greek god of wine-making and festivities. It includes a rock-cut staircase and a cave used for ritual practices. The archaeological site is adjacent to a five-star hotel. It was during the hotel's construction in the 1960s that the remains of the ancient temple were uncovered. Many different cultures have used the site. For example, the Romans built a bathhouse, or balneum, on the site. Excavation of the balneum "began in 2005". Evidence suggests that Dionysus was worshiped in the area as early as the "tenth and ninth century" BC.

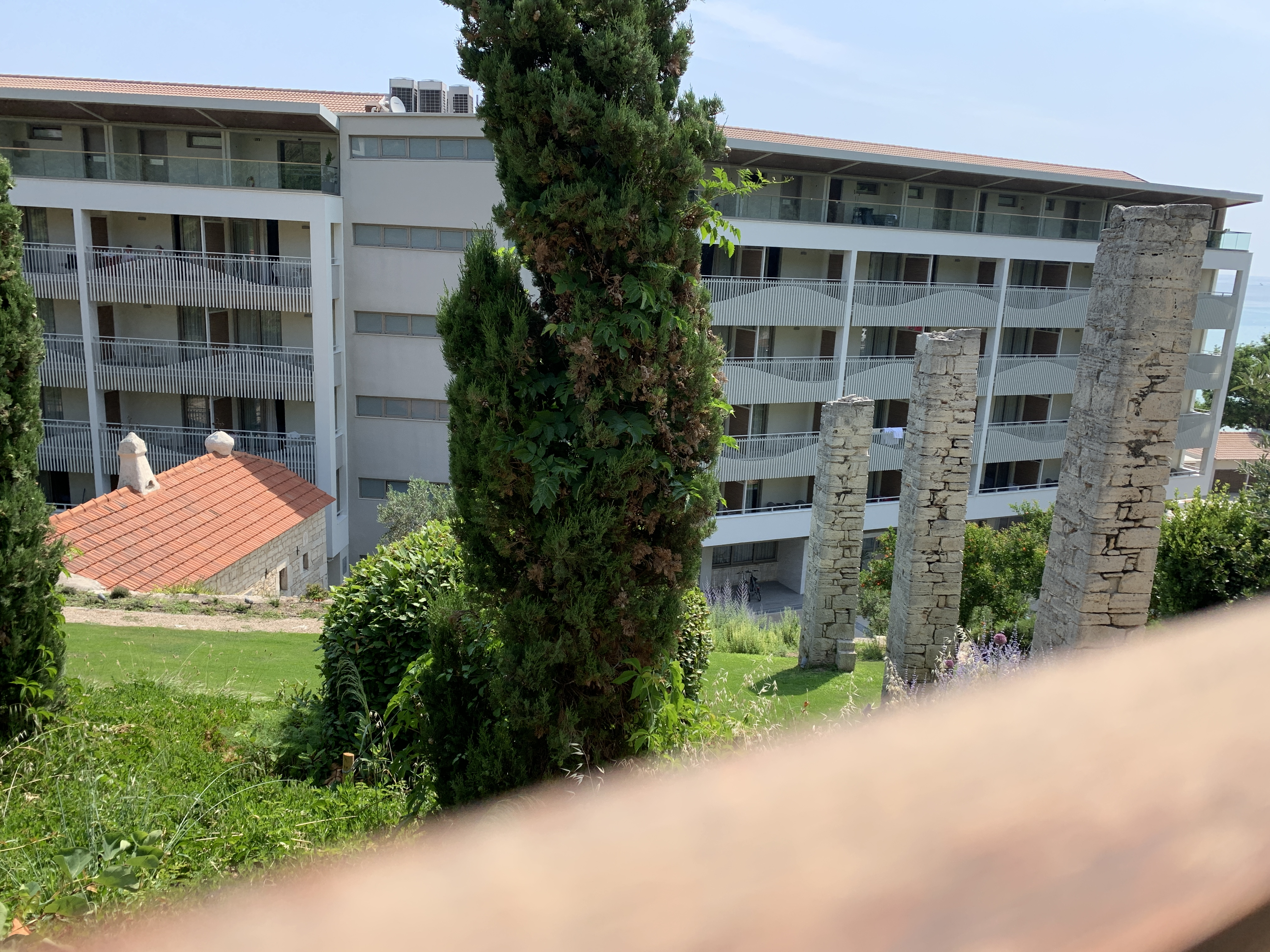
Pillars inside grounds of Ammon Zeus Hotel

As well as evidence of worship of Dionysus, there is evidence that a deity called Ammon Zeus was worshipped later on. The remains of a large Doric temple from the 4th century BCE have been identified as part of a sanctuary to Ammon Zeus, a syncretic deity combining aspects of Zeus and the Egyptian god Amun. The word "Ammon", or "Amun", means "the hidden one".

Worship of Ammon Zeus in Kallithea dates back to at least the 5th century BCE. (The worship of this deity was more recent than that of Dionysis, who was worshipped perhaps as early as the "tenth and ninth century" BC.). The site includes a prominent altar and other cult features.

=== The AD era ===
There are not only sites in Kallithea which are evidence of activity in the BC era. Kallithea is also home to archaeological sites which provide evidence of activity in the centuries following the birth of Christ (the beginning of the Anno Domini era).

A few kilometers outside Kallithea, in an area known as Solinas, archaeologists uncovered the remains of an early Christian basilica dating to the 5th century CE. The church is especially noted for a mosaic depicting a pair of deer in a paradisiacal setting — a motif commonly found in early Christian art.

=== Modern era ===
The village was founded in 1925 by refugees from Asia-Minor who settled in the area after the Asia Minor Catastrophe. They came from the village of Maltepe. The name Neos Maltepes was used for the settlement they created, in memory of their homeland, Maltepe.

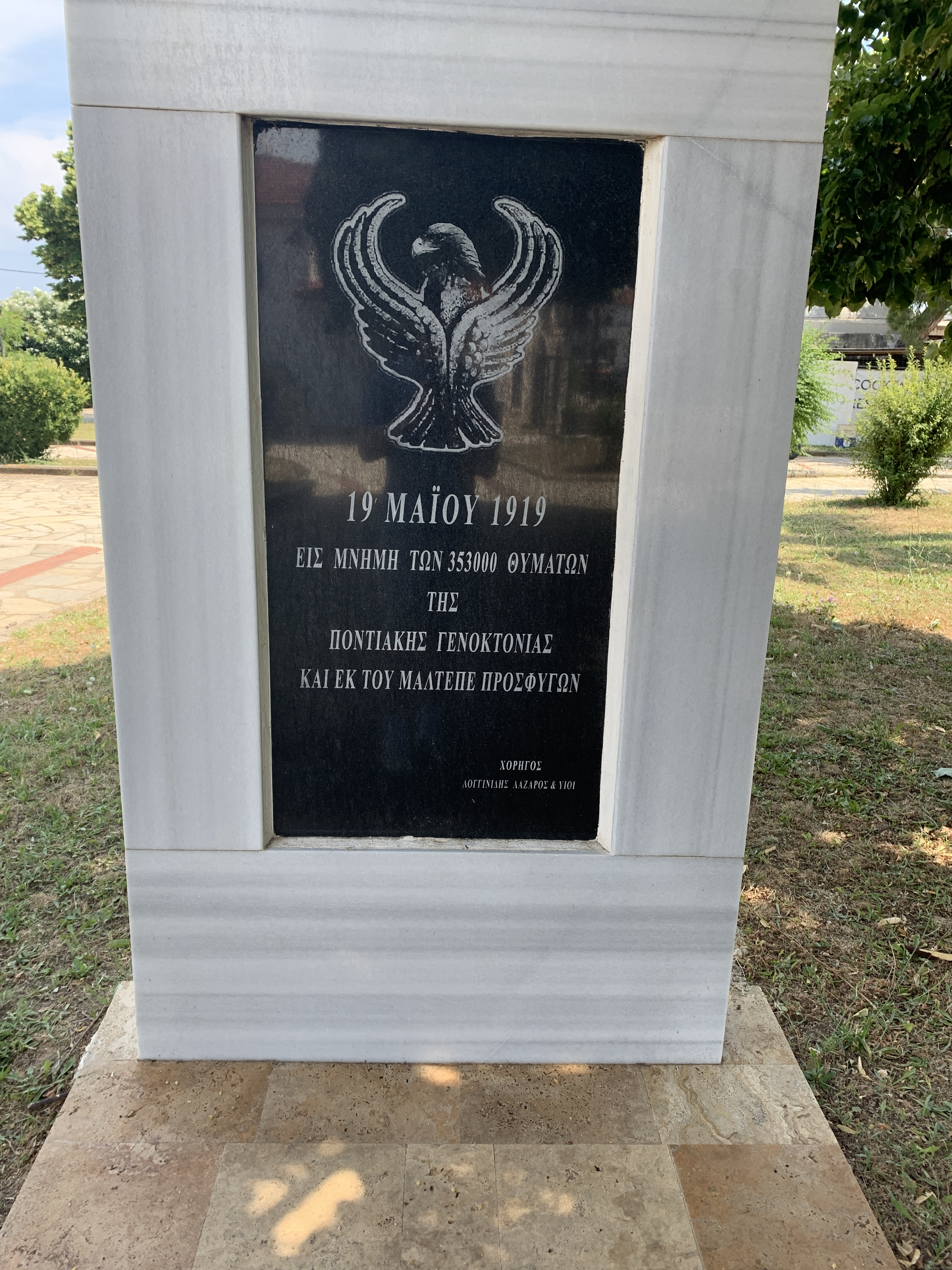
Memorial for the Pontic Greek genocide, next to Saint Nicholas Orthodox Church

The main occupations of the inhabitants were agriculture and livestock. The town after 1950 was renamed Nea Kallithea and finally Kallithea, due to the beautiful view of the village.

== Places of Interest ==
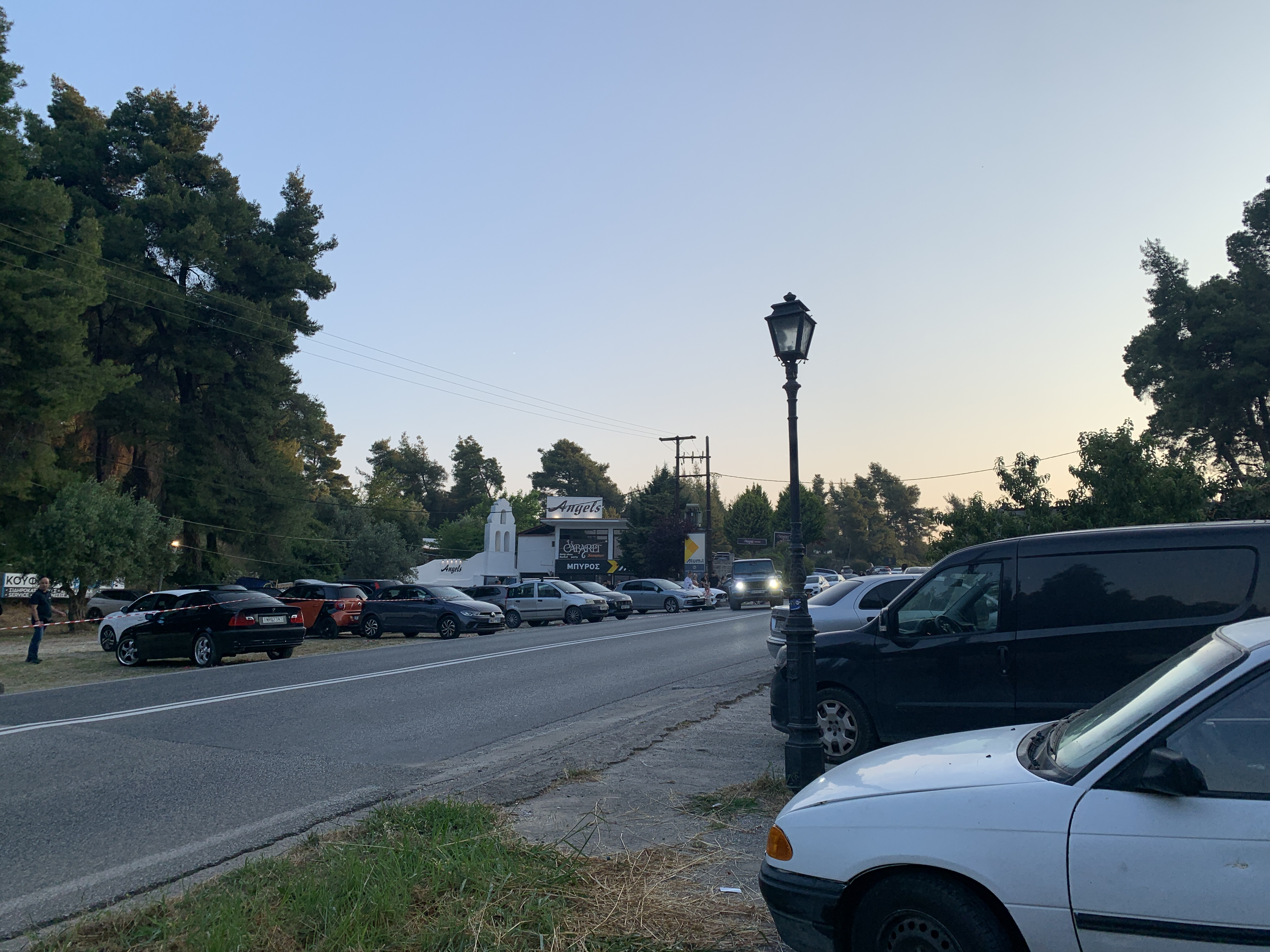
People leaving Angels nightclub at 06:30 in the morning, local time.

The main roads through Kallithea are denoted on maps as Epar. Od. Paliouriou-Afito Eparchiaki Odos (Επαρχιακή Οδός), which gets abbreviated to Epar. Od, literally means "provincial road". The term "Paliouriou-Afito" reflects the fact that the road extends between the town of Afitos, further north up the coastline, and Paliouri, a town in the south of Kassandra.

The town attracts people to its nightlife. Tourism is catered for by many restaurants and clothing shops. Many shops advertise that they sell fur and leather goods. Kallithea from the early 80's was the meeting place for all young people not only from northern Greece but throughout all Balkan countries, because of the many clubs and intense nightlife

=== Religious sites ===
- Orthodox Church of Saint Nicholas - located on the main road called Epar. Od. Paliouriou-Afito, on the part parallel with the coastline.

== Transport ==
The nearest airport is Thessaloniki Airport, often denoted SKG. It is also known as Makedonia International Airport.

An organisation called KTEL (Κοινό Ταμείο Εισπράξεων Λεωφορείων) operates bus services to and from Kallithea. These buses (often as coaches) provide transport links to nearby towns such as Nea Moudania, the neighbouring Afitos, and Chanioti. Tourists can use these coaches to get from Kallithea to Thessaloniki airport, the nearest major airport. Taxis and private vehicles may also be used.

A transportation hub provides links between Kallithea and the airport in Thessaloniki. This hub is sometimes called "KTEL Chalkidiki" (for example, on https://ktel-chalkidikis.gr/ the page is entitled "KTEL Chalkidiki"). It is distinguished from similarly named hubs (such as a KTEL Chalkidiki in Polygiros) by the fact that this one is in Pylaia and just eleven minutes drive from the private hospital called St Luke's Hospital. From this KTEL Chalkidiki hub, tourists can travel to Thessaloniki airport, which is just 15 kilometers away, using any number of possible buses.
