= Alapta =

Town in ancient Macedonia

Alapta (Ancient Greek: Ἀλαπτα) was a town of Chalcidice, ancient Macedonia. It is mentioned in the Periplus of Pseudo-Scylax as one of the cities that were inhabited by Greeks located beyond the peninsula of Pallene. It is cited between the cities of Acanthus and Arethusa.

Its site is unlocated.
