= Kalandra =

Town in Kassandra, Greece

Kalandra Καλάνδρα
- Community
- Location within Greece
- Coordinates: 39°58′29″N 23°24′01″E
- Country: Greece
- Administrative region: Central Macedonia
- Regional unit: Chalkidiki
- Municipality: Kassandra
- Municipal unit: Kassandra

Population (2021)
  - Community: 753
- Time zone: UTC+2 (EET)
  - Summer (DST): UTC+3 (EEST)

Kalandra (Greek: Καλάνδρα) is a small town on Kassandra, the westernmost peninsula of Chalkidiki, Greece. In ancient Greece it was the site of the town of Mende, one of the many colonies in Chalkidiki founded by Chalcis, the main city on the island of Euboia. Mende was also the birthplace of the sculptor Paeionius, (also Paionios), who made a statue of Nike, which was put on top of the victory pillar in Olympia, and is currently in the Archaeological Museum of Olympia. There was also a temple of Poseidon.
