= Paliouri, Chalkidiki =

Paliouri Παλιούρι
- Community
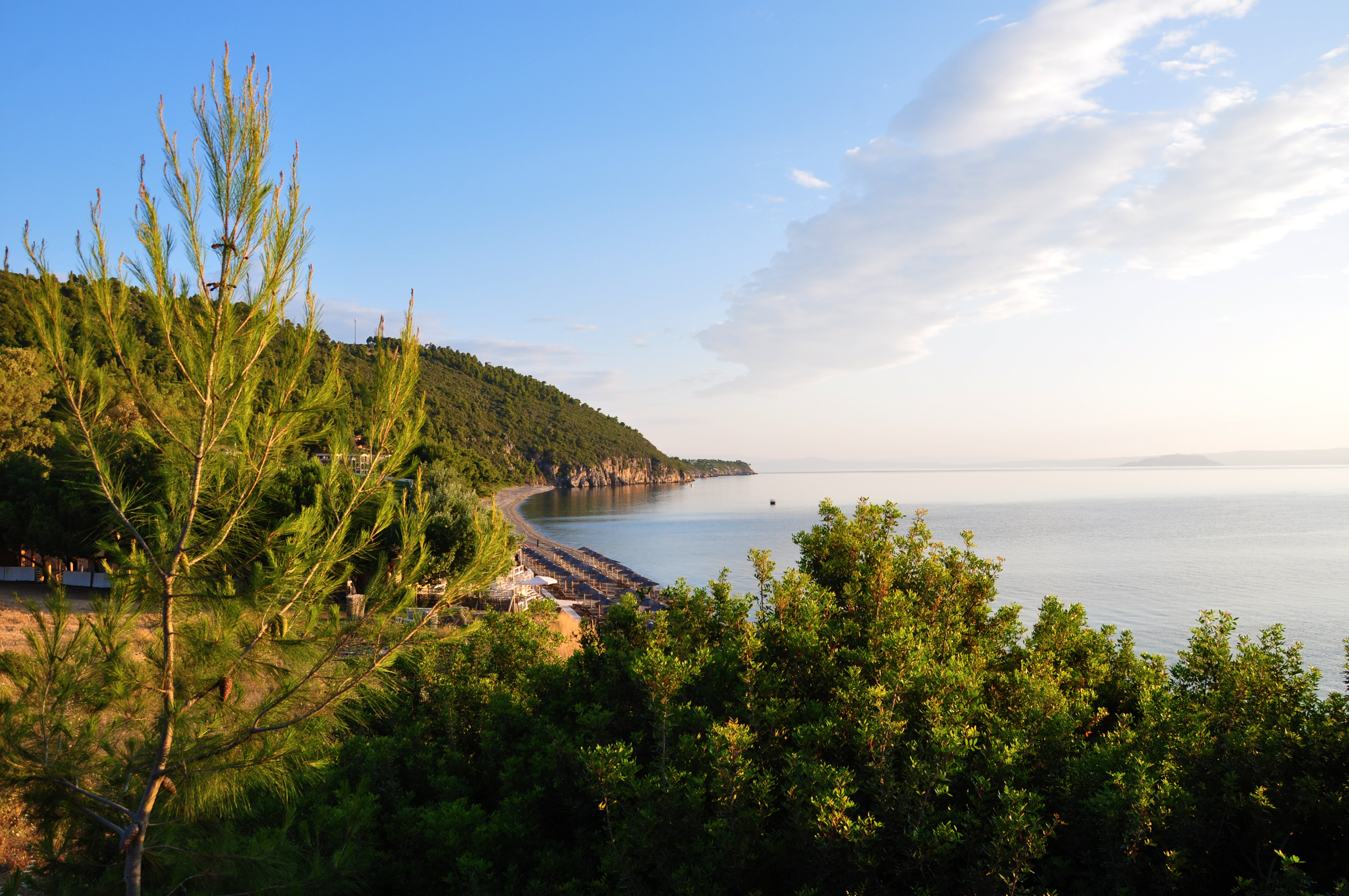
- Sunrise at Paliouri

- Location within Greece
- Coordinates: 39°56′N 23°40′E
- Country: Greece
- Administrative region: Central Macedonia
- Regional unit: Chalkidiki
- Municipality: Kassandra
- Municipal unit: Pallini

Population (2021)
  - Community: 852
- Time zone: UTC+2 (EET)
  - Summer (DST): UTC+3 (EEST)
- Vehicle registration: ΧΚ

Paliouri (Greek: Παλιούρι, pronounced [paˈʎuri]) is a village and a community in the peninsula of Kassandra, Chalkidiki, Greece. It is situated between low mountains near the southeasternmost tip of the peninsula, Cape Paliouri. The community includes the small villages Agios Nikolaos and Xyna. Paliouri is 2 km from the sea, 5 km east of Agia Paraskevi and 7 km southeast of Pefkochori. Near the modern village is the site of the ancient city of Theramvos, which survived until Roman times as a village dependent administratively of the Roman colony of Cassandreia.

== Population ==
Year	Village population	Community population
1981	663	-
1991	657	-
2001	788	826
2011	820	831
2021	848	852

== See also ==
- List of settlements in Chalkidiki
