= Nea Skioni =

Village in Macedonia, Greece

Nea Skioni Νέα Σκιώνη
- Community
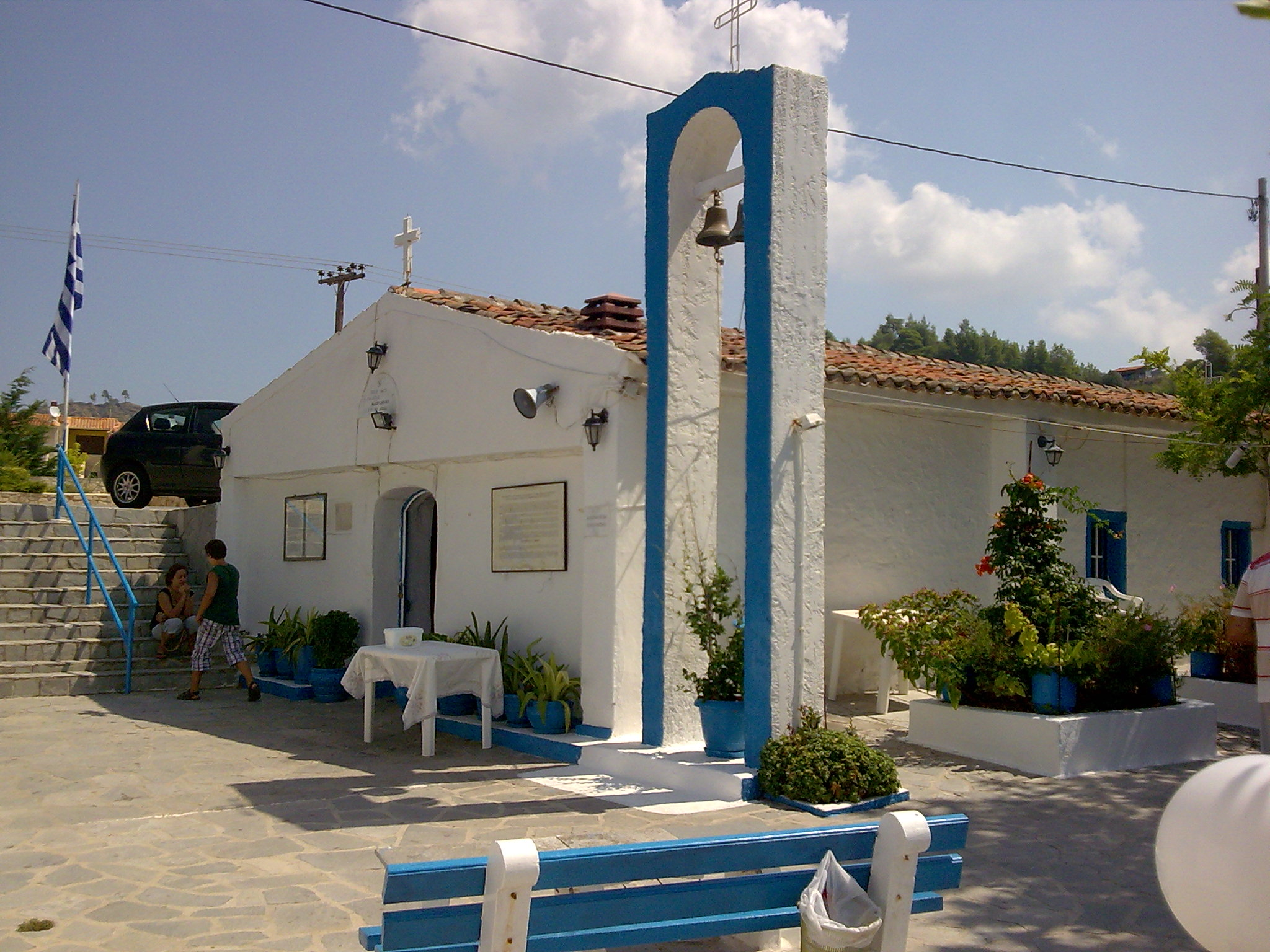
- Church of Panagia Faneromeni, located south of Nea Skioni

- Location within Greece
- Coordinates: 39°57′N 23°32′E
- Country: Greece
- Administrative region: Central Macedonia
- Regional unit: Chalkidiki
- Municipality: Kassandra
- Municipal unit: Pallini
- Village established: 1919 (107 years ago)

Population (2021)
  - Community: 718
- Time zone: UTC+2 (EET)
  - Summer (DST): UTC+3 (EEST)
- Vehicle registration: ΧΚ

Nea Skioni (Greek: Νέα Σκιώνη, pronounced [ˈnea sciˈoni]) is a village and a community in the peninsula of Kassandra, Chalkidiki, Macedonia, Greece. Nea Skioni is located 7km southwest of Chaniotis, 7 km west of Agia Paraskevi and 90km southeast of Thessaloniki. It is named after the ancient city of Scione, whose site was nearby to the east.

Nea Skioni was established in 1918 where fisherman huts existed. In 1930, the old village “Tsaprani”, which was located in the mountain of Kassandra, was abandoned.

The new village was named after the ancient Scione, which was the oldest colony. According to Thucydides, it was built after the Trojan War by the Pellineis of the Peloponnese, who were located there to spend the winter.

The village is a popular tourist destination, and has been praised for its atmosphere.

== Population ==
Year	Village population	Community population
1981	740	-
1991	786	-
2001	889	910
2011	828	854
2021	701	718

== See also ==
- List of settlements in Chalkidiki
