= Polychrono =

Polychrono Πολύχρονο
- Community
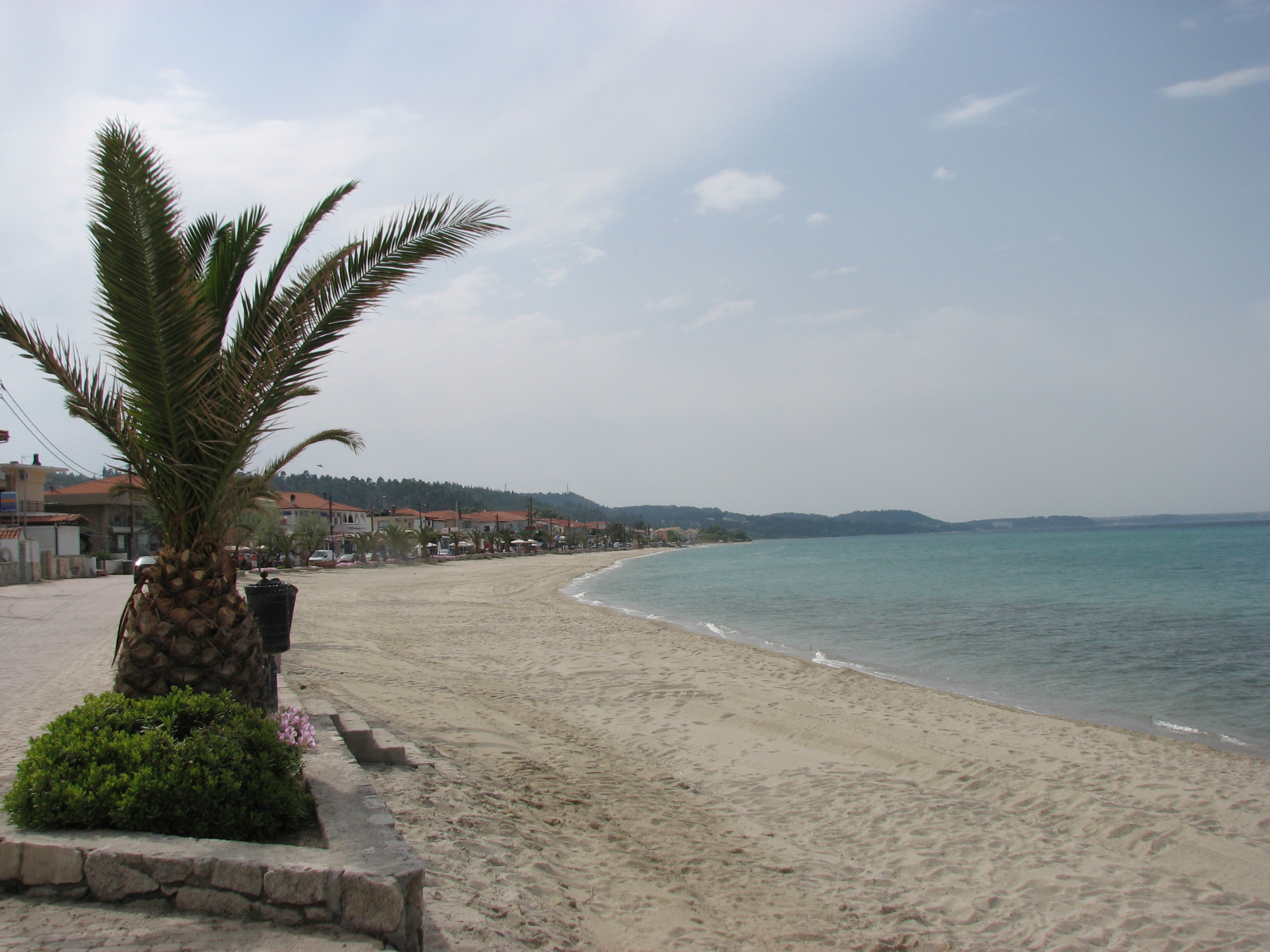

- Location within Greece
- Coordinates: 40°01′N 23°32′E
- Country: Greece
- Administrative region: Central Macedonia
- Regional unit: Chalkidiki
- Municipality: Kassandra
- Municipal unit: Pallini

Population (2021)
  - Community: 1,239
- Time zone: UTC+2 (EET)
  - Summer (DST): UTC+3 (EEST)
- Vehicle registration: ΧΚ

Polychrono (Greek: Πολύχρονο, Polýchrono, IPA: [poˈlixrono]) is a town located in the eastern part of the peninsula of Kassandra, Chalkidiki, Greece. Its elevation is 10 metres (33 ft). Polychrono is situated on the northeastern coast of the peninsula, 4 km northwest of Chaniotis and 85 km southeast of Thessaloniki. There are forests in the mountains near Polychrono, and farmlands near the coast. Tourism is an important sector in Polychrono, attracted by its beach.

Located in the modern village is the site of ancient Neapolis, which in Roman times was rebuilt in a nearby place with remains of a Roman settlement.

== Population ==
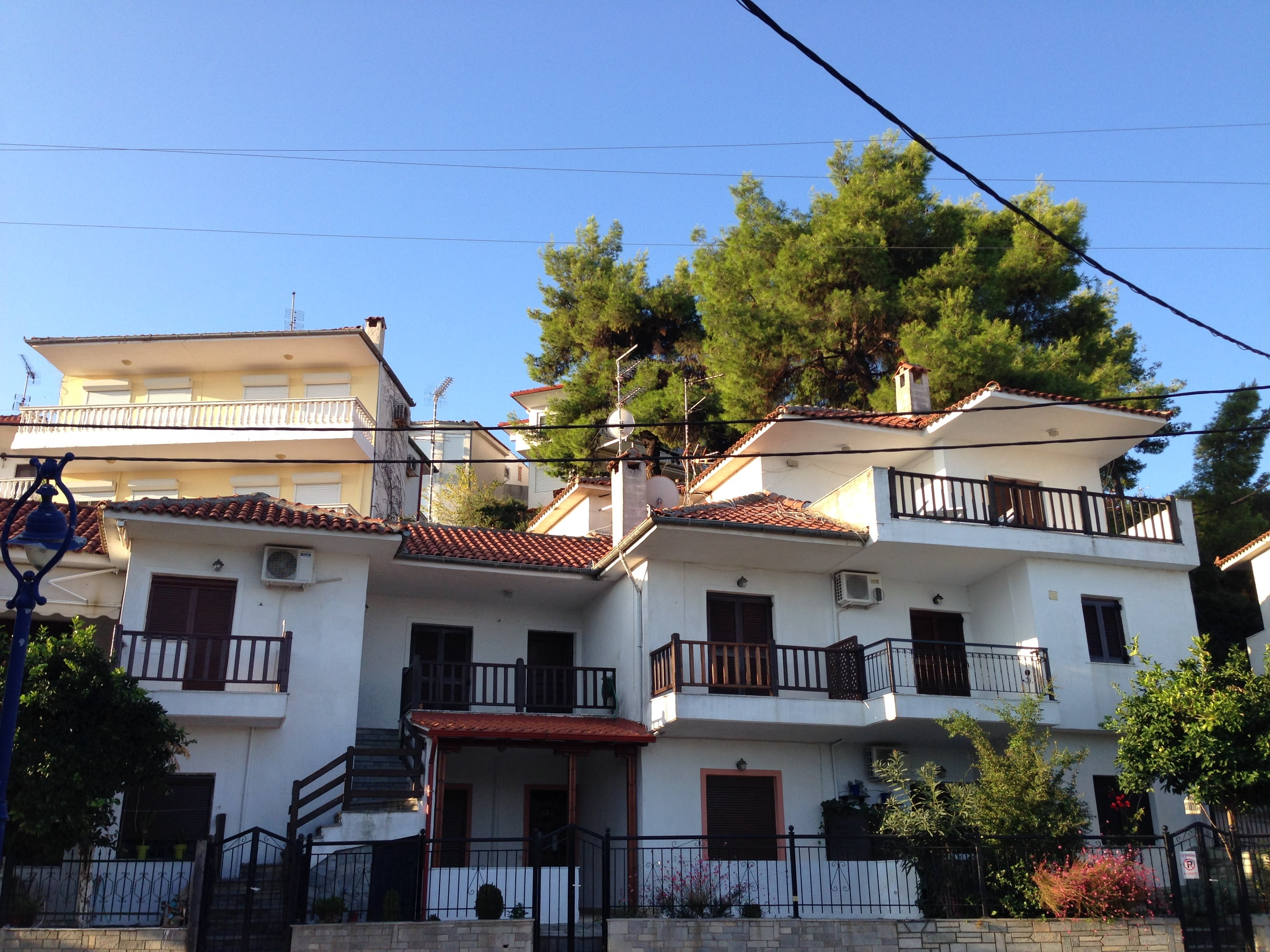
Houses

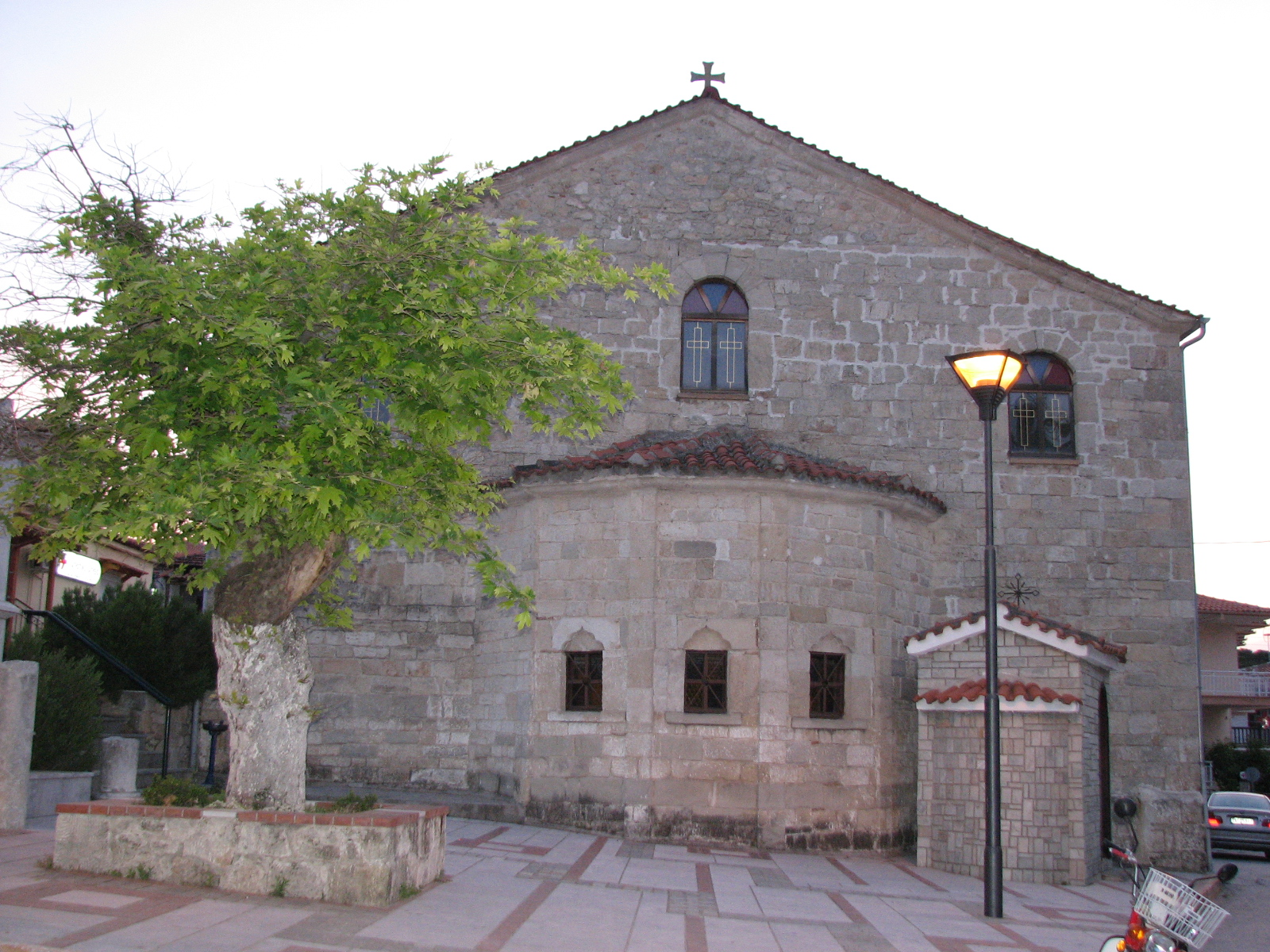
A church in Polychrono

Historical population
Year	Pop.	±%
1981	530	—
1991	751	+41.7%
2001	1,010	+34.5%
2011	997	−1.3%
2021	1,239	+24.3%

== See also ==
- List of settlements in Chalkidiki
