= Pefkochori =

Town in Macedonia, Greece

Pefkochori Πευκοχώρι
- Community
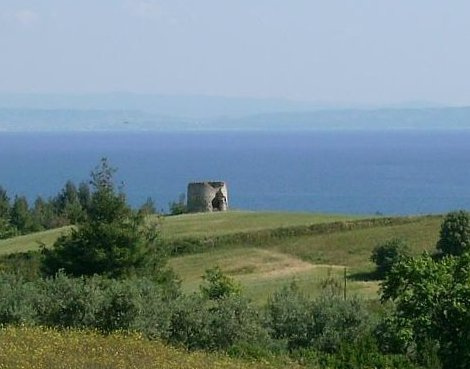
- An old windmill, Pefkochori village.

- Location within Greece
- Coordinates: 39°59′N 23°37′E
- Country: Greece
- Administrative region: Central Macedonia
- Regional unit: Chalkidiki
- Municipality: Kassandra
- Municipal unit: Pallini

Population (2021)
  - Community: 2,228
- Time zone: UTC+2 (EET)
  - Summer (DST): UTC+3 (EEST)
- Vehicle registration: ΧΚ

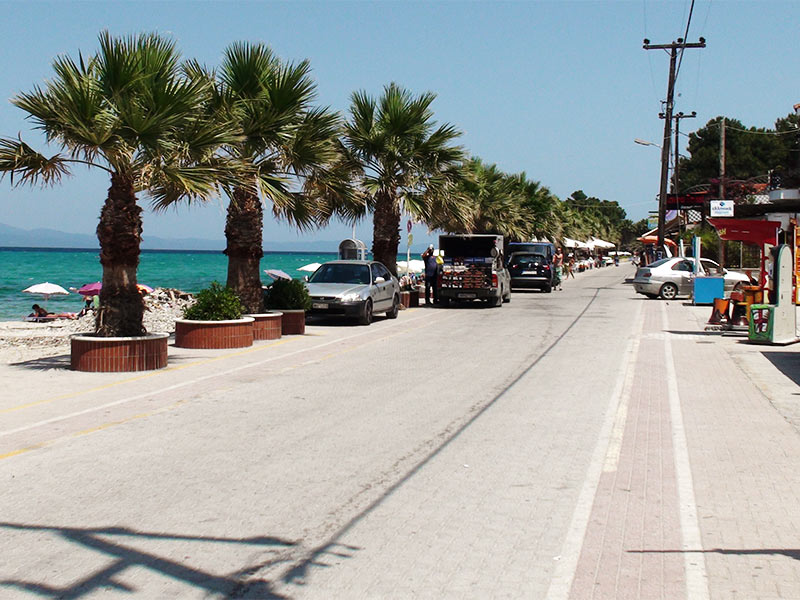
Promenade

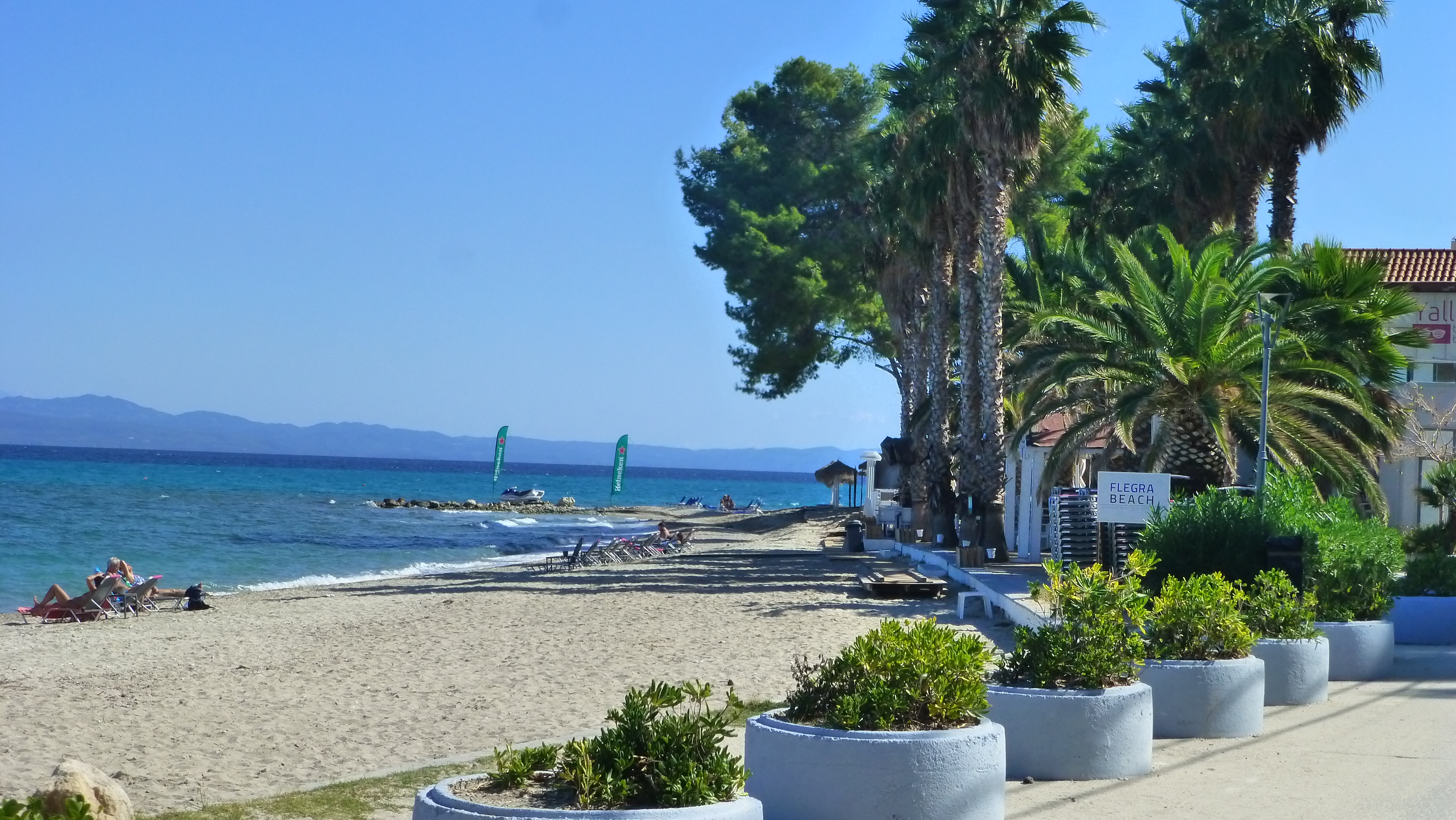
Beach

Pefkochori (Greek: Πευκοχώρι, Pefkochóri [pefkoˈxori], meaning "pine village"; before 1965: Kapsochora (Καψοχώρα, Kapsochóra)) is a tourist town located in the southeast of the peninsula of Kassandra, Chalkidiki, Greece. Pefkochori is named after the pine trees which are abundant in the mountains of the area. The community of Pefkochori also includes the villages Lefkes and Panorama. Its elevation is 10 m. Pefkochori is situated on the northeastern coast of the peninsula, 3 km southeast of Chaniotis, 4 km north of Agia Paraskevi and 92 km southeast of Thessaloniki.

== Population ==
Year	Town population	Community population
1981	640	-
1991	1,149	-
2001	1,650	1,666
2011	2,141	2,162
2021	2,194	2,228

== See also ==
- List of settlements in Chalkidiki
