= Vavdos Folklore Collection =

Museum in Vavdos, Greece

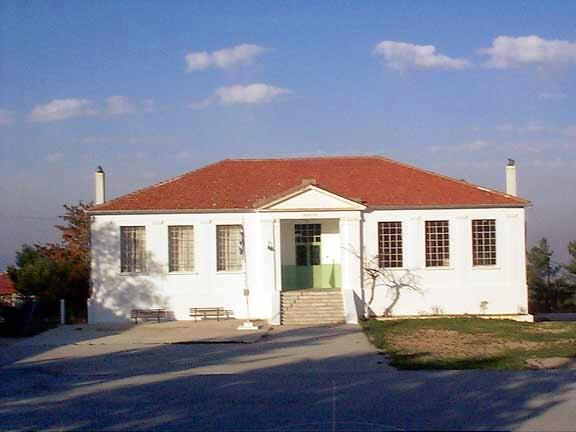
Outside View

Vavdos is an old mountain village in Chalkidiki, Central Macedonia, Greece. It is 40 km from Thessaloniki and accessed from the Thessaloniki-Polygyros provincial road. In the summer of 1997 the Association of Vavdonians in Thessaloniki and the Folklore and Ethnological Museum of Macedonia and Thrace assembled a folklore collection, which is housed in the junior school, in a room designed for the purpose with its own separate entrance. The exhibits were donated by the villagers.

The exhibition presents the traditional life of Vavdos through artefacts and photographs from the late nineteenth and early twentieth century. There is a reconstruction of a traditional household, including a loom in one corner used to clothe those living in the house, clothing (mainly female) in another corner, a sitting-room with a fireplace, a wash-stand, a cradle, a bed and a wardrobe, a traditional kitchen, and a cellar containing bread, oil, wine, and objects connected with them. There are also artefacts connected with the economic life of the village: beekeeping, agriculture, sericulture, stockbreeding, forestry, and, particularly, magnesite mining near the village.

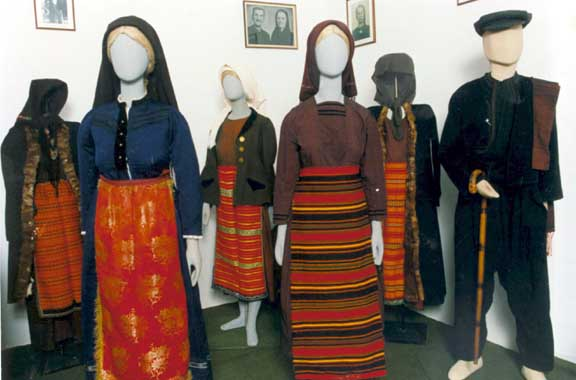
Vavdos Traditional Costumes

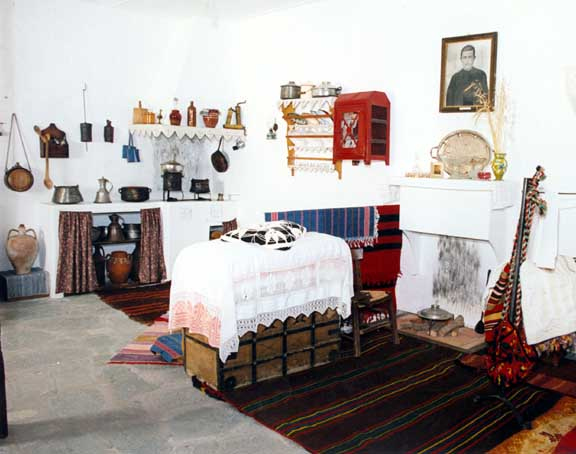
Interior View of the Traditional House

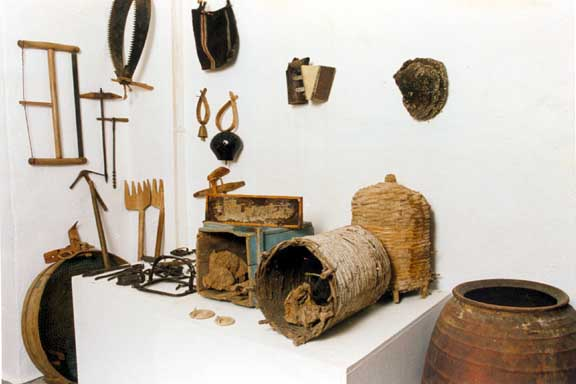
Beekeeping Tools

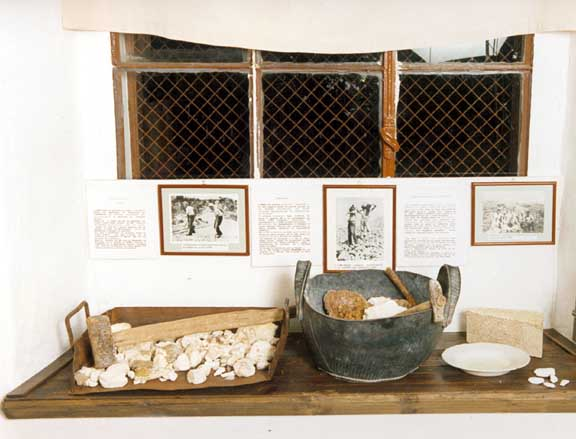
Magnesite Mining Near the Village

== Sources ==
- This article incorporates text from the corresponding article at the Museums of Macedonia website, commissioned by the Macedonian Heritage foundation, written by Vlasis Vlasidis, and published under a CC-BY-SA-3.0 license.
