= Metamorfosi, Chalkidiki =

Metamorfosi Μεταμόρφωση
- Community
- Location within Greece
- Coordinates: 40°13′55″N 23°36′13″E
- Country: Greece
- Administrative region: Central Macedonia
- Regional unit: Chalkidiki
- Municipality: Polygyros
- Municipal unit: Ormylia
- Highest elevation: 20 m (66 ft)

Population (2021)
  - Community: 606
- Time zone: UTC+2 (EET)
  - Summer (DST): UTC+3 (EEST)
- Postal code: 631 00
- Area code: 23710
- Vehicle registration: XK

Metamorfosi (Greek: Μεταμόρφωση) is a village in Chalkidiki regional unit of Central Macedonia, Greece. It was settled in 1925 by Greek refugees from Asia Minor (now Turkey) after the Population exchange between Greece and Turkey.

Since the 2011 local government reform it is part of the municipality Polygyros. It is located on a beach and forests surround the village. It is a small village with just over 600 residents, although in the summer season the population swells with tourists from Greece and neighbouring countries.
