= Antimoerus =

Antimoerus (Ancient Greek: Ἀντίμοιρος) was a sophist of ancient Greece. He was a native of Mende in Thrace, and is mentioned with praise among the disciples of the sophist Protagoras. This is the only reference to Antimoerus that has survived to the present day.

Because those studying with sophists were typically obtaining their education in order to enter a political career, Antimoerus was unusual in that he was studying with Protagoras in order to follow in his teacher's footsteps and become a sophist himself.
