= Aege =

Ancient town in Chalcidice, Greece

Coordinates: 39°58′43″N 23°39′58″E

Aege or Aige (Ancient Greek: Αἰγή) was a town of the Pallene peninsula in the Chalcidice in ancient Macedonia. It is mentioned by Herodotus as one of the cities of the peninsula of Pallene where at 480 BCE Xerxes recruited troops and ships in his Second Persian invasion of Greece. But, in 479 BCE the city sent troops to help Potidaea against the Persians, when that city was besieged by the Persian army under the command of Artabazus. Later, the city was a member of the Delian League since it is mentioned in Athenian tribute lists from 454/3 to 415/4 BCE.

The site of Aege is near the modern Pefkokhori.
