= Kassandreia =

Kassandreia Κασσάνδρεια
- Community
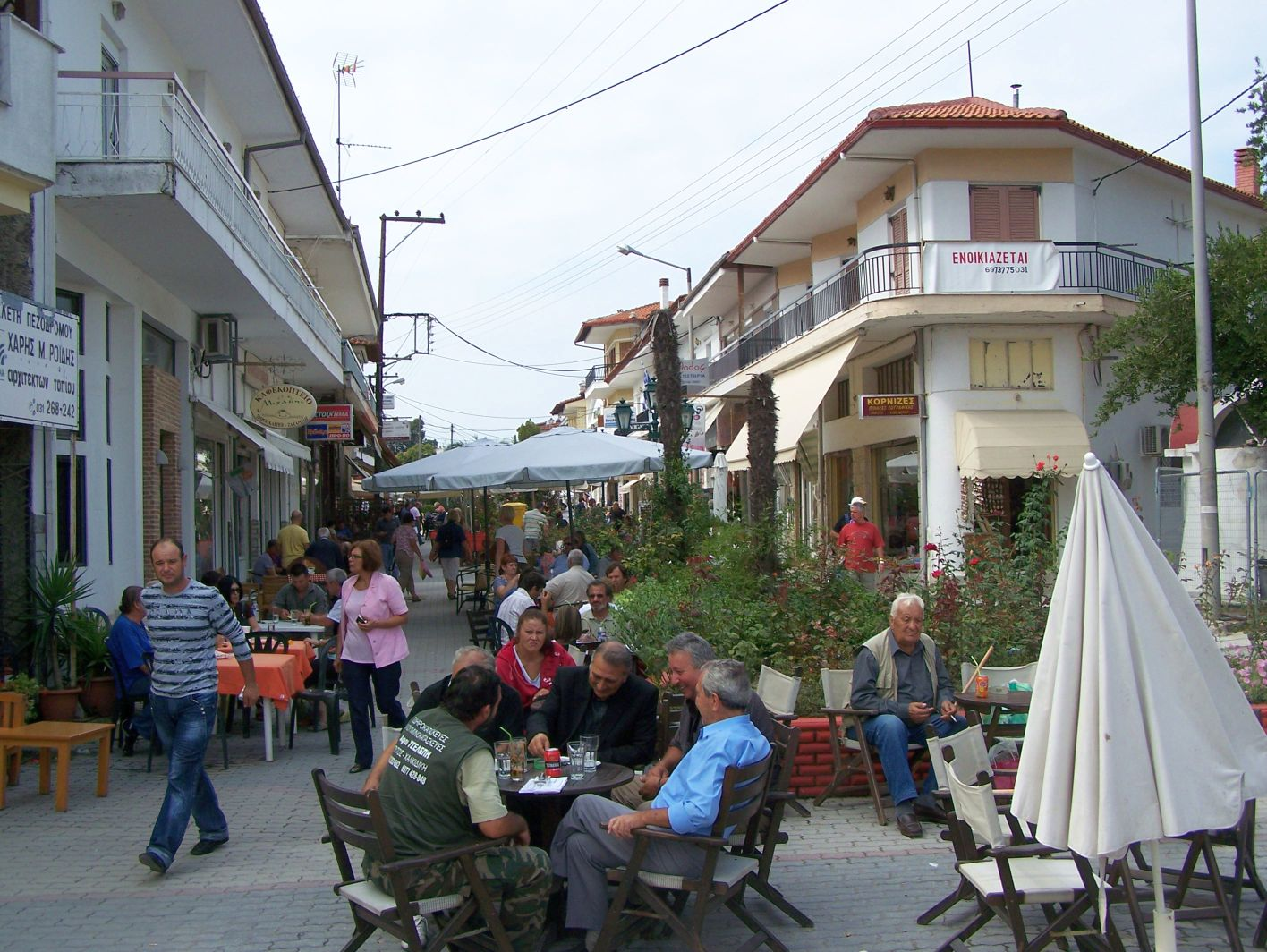

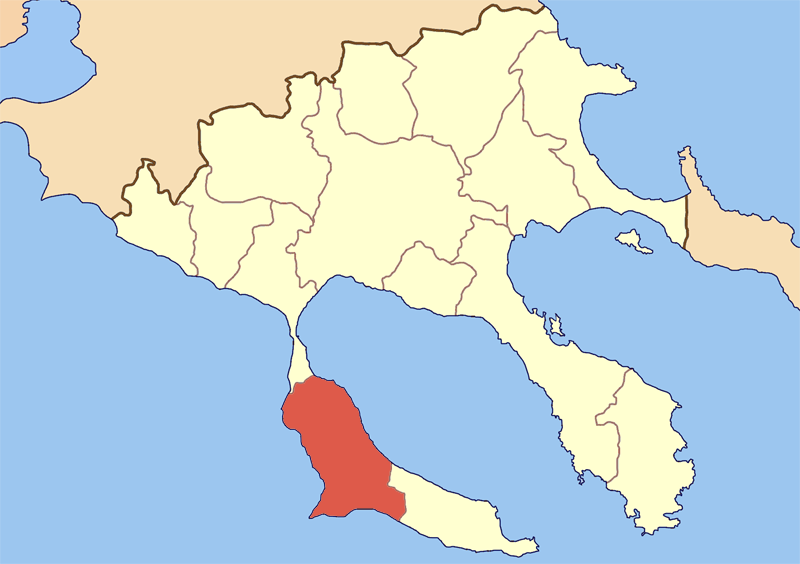

- Location within Greece
- Coordinates: 40°02.9′N 23°24.8′E
- Country: Greece
- Administrative region: Central Macedonia
- Regional unit: Chalkidiki
- Municipality: Kassandra
- Municipal unit: Kassandra

Population (2021)
  - Community: 3,158
- Time zone: UTC+2 (EET)
  - Summer (DST): UTC+3 (EEST)
- Postal code: 631 00
- Area code: 23710
- Vehicle registration: ΧΚ

Kassandreia (Greek: Κασσάνδρεια, Kassándreia), known as Valta before 1955 (Βάλτα, Válta, meaning "town in the swamps"), is a town and a community in Chalkidiki, northern Greece. It is the seat of the municipality of Kassandra, in the center of the peninsula. Its population was 3,158 at the 2021 census. It was named after the ancient city Cassandrea, which was located near the village. This ancient city, which had originally been called Potidaea, was enlarged by Cassander who became the ruler of Macedonia for a number of years, and named after him. It is probably at this time that the channel that separates this peninsula from the mainland was dredged, to aid naval activities. The ancient name has now been revived for the modern small town that has been built on the site of the ancient Cassandrea, and it is called 'New Potidaea', or in Greek Nea Poteidaia.
