= Krini, Greece =

Krini Κρήνη
- Community
- Location within Greece
- Coordinates: 40°24′N 23°10′E
- Country: Greece
- Administrative region: Central Macedonia
- Regional unit: Chalkidiki
- Municipality: Nea Propontida
- Municipal unit: Triglia

Population (2021)
  - Community: 394
- Time zone: UTC+2 (EET)
  - Summer (DST): UTC+3 (EEST)

Krini (Greek: Κρήνη) is a small town of approximately 400 year-round inhabitants in Northern Greece. Krini is a community of the municipal unit Triglia, regional unit of Chalkidiki. Krini's main agricultural crops include wheat, olives, onions, grapes, and anise.
