= Cassandreia =

City in Ancient Macedonia

Coordinates: 40.195°N 23.330°E

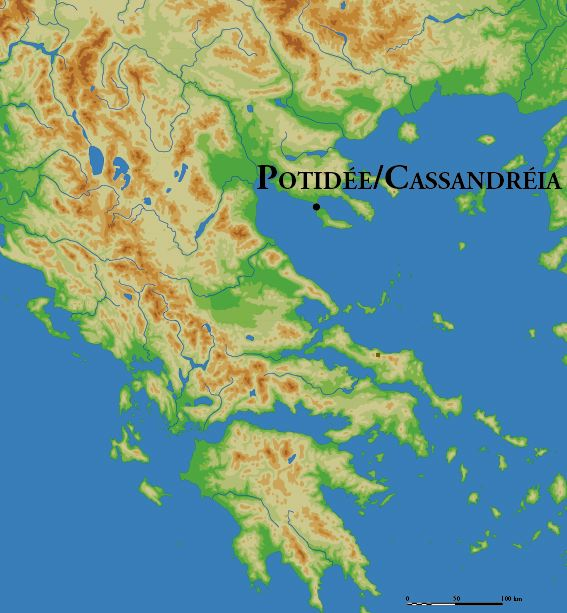
Cassandreia

Cassandreia or Cassandrea (Ancient Greek: Κασσάνδρεια, Kassándreia) was once one of the most important cities in Ancient Macedonia, founded by and named after Cassander in 316 BC. It was located on the site of the earlier Ancient Greek city of Potidaea, at the isthmus of the Pallene peninsula. The fact that Cassander named it after himself suggests that he may have intended it to be his capital, and if the canal which cuts the peninsula at this point was dug or at least planned in his time, he may have intended to develop his naval forces using it as a base with a harbour on each of the east and west sides. Cassandreia soon became a great and powerful city, surpassing the other Macedonian towns in wealth. Philip V of Macedon made Cassandreia his main naval base. At the end of the Roman Republic, around 43 BC by order of Brutus a Roman colony was settled by the proconsul Q. Hortensius Hortalus, which in 30 BC was resettled by August with the installation of new settlers and took the official name Colonia Iulia Augusta Cassandrensis. The territory of the colony had included within its boundaries the peninsula of Pallini and the district stretched north of the canal to the foot of the mountain Cholomontas. The colony enjoyed ius Italicum, and is mentioned in Pliny the Elder's encyclopaedia and in inscriptions. It was destroyed by the Huns and Slavs around 540 AD.

The modern settlement of Kassandreia (named Valta before 1955) lies to the south of the ancient site. The ancient site of Cassandreia, near the town Nea Poteidaia, has not been excavated.

The Christian diocese based on the ancient town is mentioned in the early 10th-century Notitiae Episcopatuum of Byzantine Emperor Leo VI the Wise. Its bishop Hermogenes participated in both the Robber Council of Ephesus in 449 and the Council of Chalcedon in 451. In addition to the ancient Greek Orthodox metropolis (el), Cassandria is also listed today by the Catholic Church as a titular see.

== Notable people ==
- Aristobulus (4th century BC), historian
- Poseidippus (3rd century BC), comic poet
