= Kassandra, Chalkidiki =

Peninsula in Chalkidiki, Macedonia, Greece

Kassandra Κασσάνδρα
- Municipality
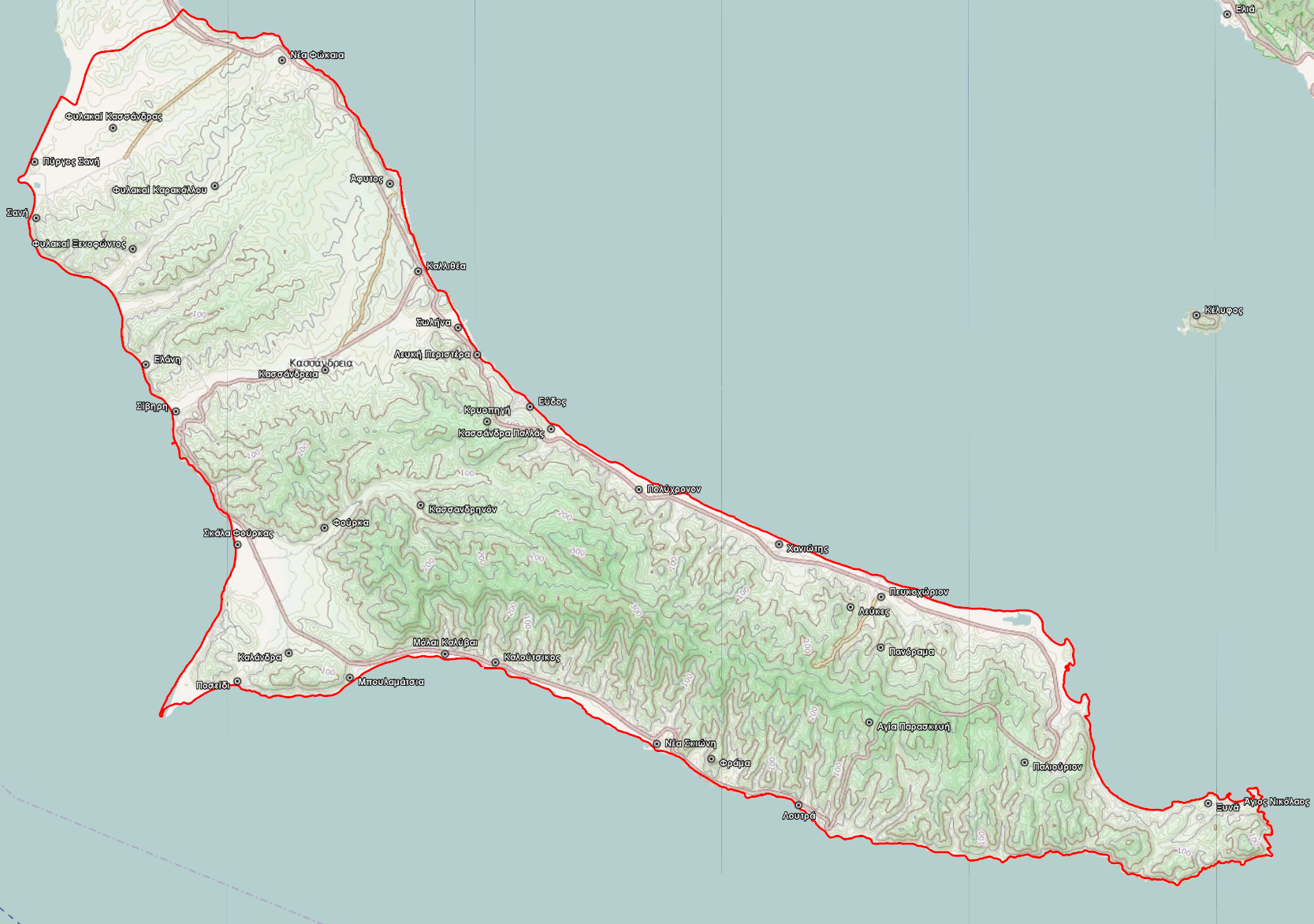
- Kassandra municipality

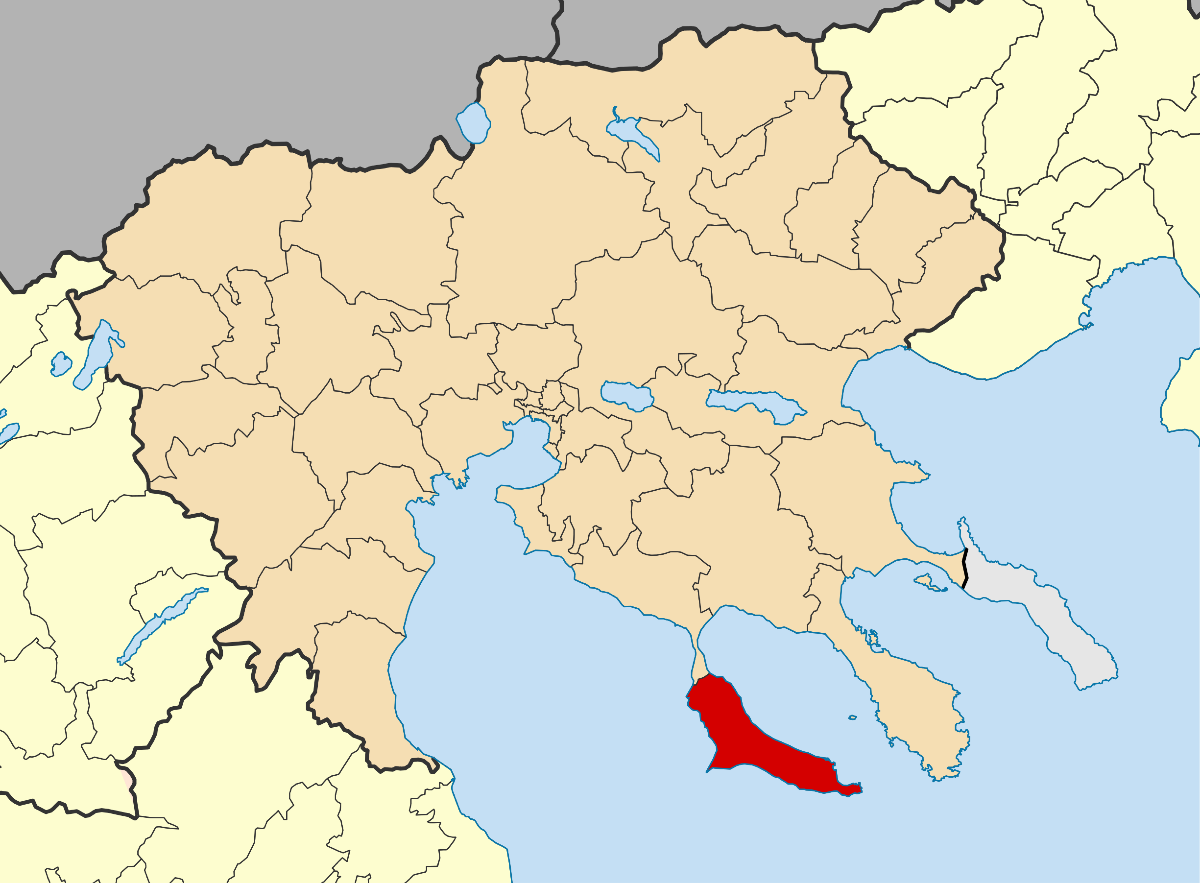

- Location within Greece
- Coordinates: 40°01′22.54″N 23°26′0.28″E
- Country: Greece
- Administrative region: Central Macedonia
- Regional unit: Chalkidiki
- Seat: Kassandreia

Area
  - Municipality: 334.3 km^{2} (129.1 sq mi)
  - Municipal unit: 206.1 km^{2} (79.6 sq mi)

Population (2021)
  - Municipality: 16,861
  - Density: 50.44/km^{2} (130.6/sq mi)
  - Municipal unit: 10,526
  - Municipal unit density: 51.07/km^{2} (132.3/sq mi)
- Time zone: UTC+2 (EET)
  - Summer (DST): UTC+3 (EEST)
- Postal code: 631 00
- Area code: 23710
- Vehicle registration: ΧΚ

Kassandra (Greek: Κασσάνδρα) or Kassandra Peninsula (Χερσόνησος Κασσάνδρας, Chersónisos Kassándras) is a peninsula and a municipality in Chalkidiki, Macedonia, Greece. The seat of the municipality is in Kassandreia.

== Municipality ==
The municipality Kassandra was formed at the 2011 local government reform by the merger of the following 2 former municipalities, that became municipal units (communities in brackets):

- Kassandra (Afytos, Fourka, Kalandra, Kallithea, Kassandreia, Kassandrino, Kryopigi, Nea Fokaia)
- Pallini (Agia Paraskevi, Chaniotis, Nea Skioni, Paliouri, Pefkochori, Polychrono)

The municipality has an area of 334.280 km^{2}, the municipal unit 206.097 km^{2}.

== History ==
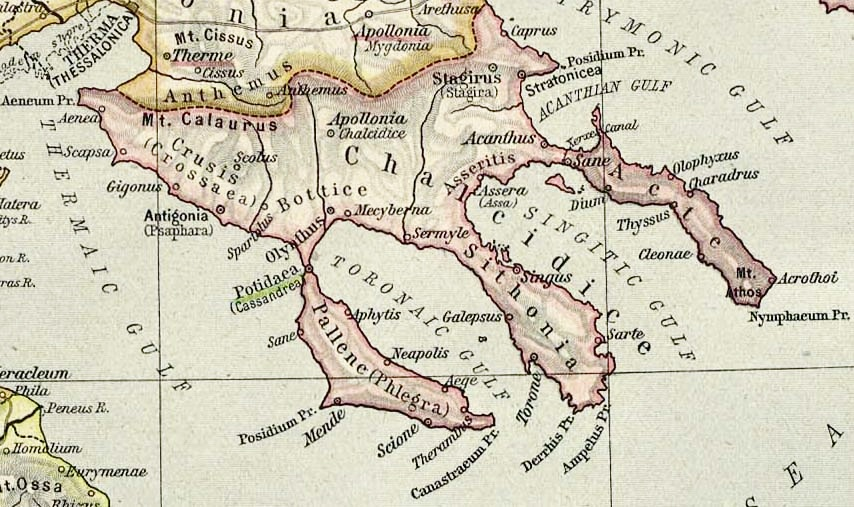
Headland of Pallene in ancient Chalcidice

Pallene (Greek: Παλλήνη) is the ancient name of the westernmost of the three headlands of Chalcidice, which run out into the Aegean Sea. It is said to have anciently borne the name of Phlegra (Φλέγρα) and to have witnessed the conflict between the gods and the earthborn Gigantes. The modern name of the peninsula is Kassandra, which, besides affording excellent winter pasture for cattle and sheep, also produces an abundance of grain of superior quality, as well as wool, honey, and wax, besides raising silkworms.

In antiquity, Pallene was the site of numerous towns: Sane, Mende, Scione, Therambos, Aege, Neapolis, Aphytis, which were either wholly or partly colonies from Eretria.

The narrow isthmus of Potidea was later expanded into a canal, reportedly between the 4th and 1st centuries BC under King Cassander of Macedon, thereby transforming the peninsula into an artificial island.

After the founding of the Roman colony of Cassandreia (43 BC), located at the site of ancient Potidaea, the entire peninsula of Pallene was included in the colony territory. Strabo mentions five cities of Pallene at the turn of the eras: Cassandreia, Aphytis, Mende, Scione and Sane.

In Late Antiquity, the center of the peninsula was the city of Cassandreia or Kassandreia. A polis and a bishopric, Cassandreia was destroyed by the Huns in 539 or 540 AD. After this, Emperor Justinian I built a wall at the entrance of the peninsula, but it is not until the 10th century that a sizeable settlement—described as a township (polichnion) and later as a fortress (kastron)—re-appears in the peninsula and that the bishopric is mentioned again, as a suffragan of Thessalonica. The area prospered due to its fertility, and both Thessalonians as well as the monks of the growing monastic community at nearby Mount Athos had estates there.

In the winter of 1307/08, the peninsula and the city were seized and held by the Catalan Company during their move from Thrace to southern Greece. The 14th-century historian Nikephoros Gregoras describes Kassandreia as "abandoned" during his time, and sometime before 1407, Emperor John VII Palaiologos rebuilt the old fortifications of Justinian. As a de facto annex of Thessalonica, the peninsula shared the city's fate and came under a brief Venetian control in 1423, before being captured by the Ottoman Empire in c. 1430.

Kassandra (Turkish: Kesendire) was one of the places that rebelled against the Ottomans in 1821. Because it managed to stop the Turkish army from fighting the rebels in southern Greece, the entire peninsula was burnt by the Turks. Many refugees moved with fishing boats to the islands of Skiathos, Skopelos, Alonnisos and Euboeia. In 1912 it became a part of Greece.

The peninsula was lined with paved roads in the mid-20th century. Tourism also arrived after the war period of World War II and the Greek Civil War. More paved roads were added in the 1970s and the 1980s and tourism developed rapidly. Agriculture shifted to tourism and other businesses as the primary industry of the peninsula in the 1980s. The eastern coastal strip from Kallithea down to Pefkochori became especially built up with resorts.

On August 22, 2006, the peninsula was struck by a major forest fire that affected the central and the southern parts of the peninsula, on the day of the heatwave when temperatures soared to nearly 40 °C. Several houses were destroyed including villas, hotels and a campground, while the natural beauty was erased. It burnt large areas of forests including some farmlands. The cause of this tremendous fire was dry lightning which occurred throughout the evening. The forest fire lasted nearly five days and devastated the economy and the peninsula. Villages that were affected were Chanioti, Nea Skioni, Polychrono, Pefkochori and Kriopigi. The forests mostly recovered again after 10 years.

== Twin cities ==
Cassandreia is twinned with the following cities:

- Niš, Serbia

== Sources ==
- Fotić, Aleksandar (2009). "Kassandra in the Ottoman Documents from Chilandar (Hilandar) Monastery (Mount Athos) in the Sixteenth and Seventeenth Centuries". Balcanica. 40: 57–73. doi:10.2298/BALC0940057F.
