= Chaniotis =

Town in Chalkidiki, Greece

Chaniotis Χανιώτης
- Community
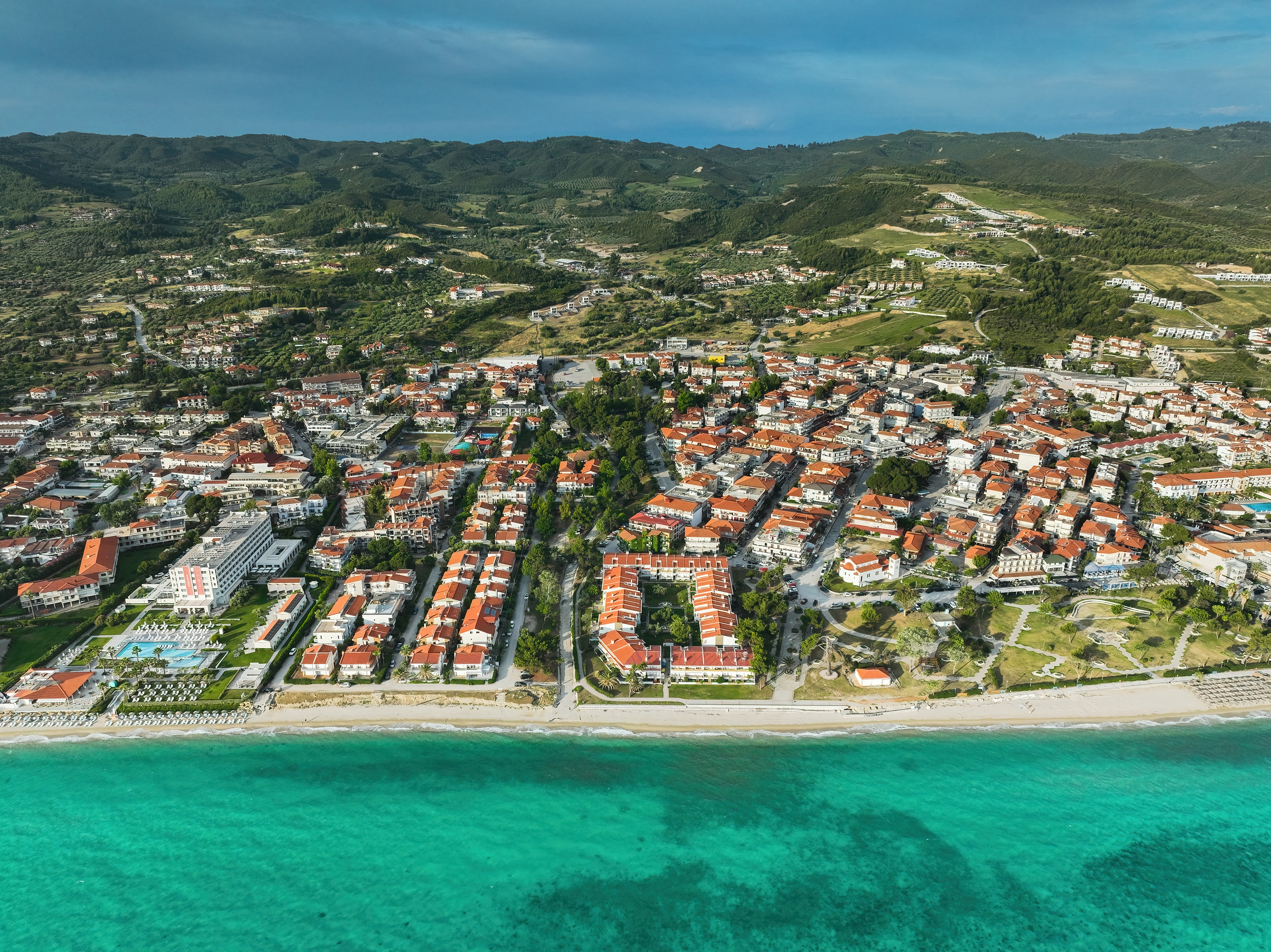

- Location within Greece
- Coordinates: 40°00′N 23°34′E
- Country: Greece
- Administrative region: Central Macedonia
- Regional unit: Chalkidiki
- Municipality: Kassandra
- Municipal unit: Pallini

Population (2021)
  - Community: 938
- Time zone: UTC+2 (EET)
  - Summer (DST): UTC+3 (EEST)
- Vehicle registration: ΧΚ

Chaniotis (Greek: Χανιώτης, Chaniótis [xaˈɲotis] or Χανιώτη, Chanióti), is a town in the eastern part of the peninsula of Kassandra, Chalkidiki, Greece. Chaniotis is on the northeastern coast of the peninsula, 3 km northwest of Pefkochori, 4 km southeast of Polychrono, 7 km northeast of Nea Skioni and 89 km southeast of Thessaloniki.

== Population ==
Historical population
Year	Pop.	±%
1981	379	—
1991	528	+39.3%
2001	948	+79.5%
2011	893	−5.8%
2021	938	+5.0%
