= Chalkidiki =

Peninsula in Macedonia, Greece

Chalkidiki Περιφερειακή ενότητα Χαλκιδικής
- Regional unit
- Municipalities of Chalkidiki

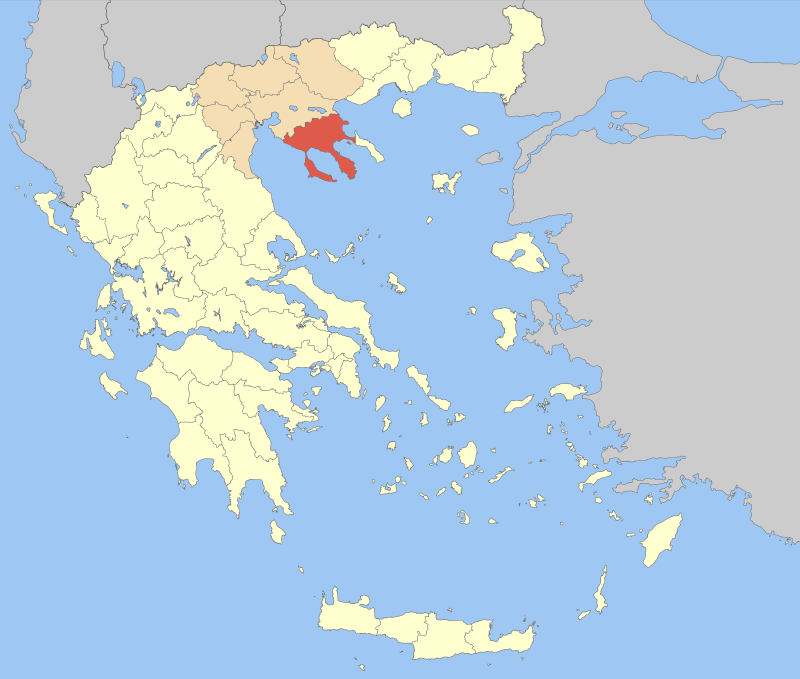
- Chalkidiki within Greece

- Location within Greece
- Coordinates: 40°20′N 23°30′E
- Country: Greece
- Geographic region: Macedonia
- Administrative region: Central Macedonia
- Seat: Polygyros

Area
  - Total: 2,918 km^{2} (1,127 sq mi)

Population (2021)
  - Total: 102,085
  - Density: 34.98/km^{2} (90.61/sq mi)
- Time zone: UTC+2 (EET)
  - Summer (DST): UTC+3 (EEST)
- Postal code: 63x xx
- Area code: 237x0, 239x0
- Vehicle registration: ΧΚ
- Website: www.halkidiki.gov.gr

Chalkidiki (/kælˈkɪdɪki/; Greek: Χαλκιδική, romanized: Chalkidikḗ [xalciðiˈci]), Halkidiki, or Chalcidice is a peninsula and regional unit of Greece, in coastal Macedonia. The capital of Chalkidiki is the town of Polygyros, located in the centre of the peninsula, while the largest town is Nea Moudania. Chalkidiki is a popular summer tourist destination in Central Macedonia. The autonomous Mount Athos region constitutes the easternmost part of the peninsula.

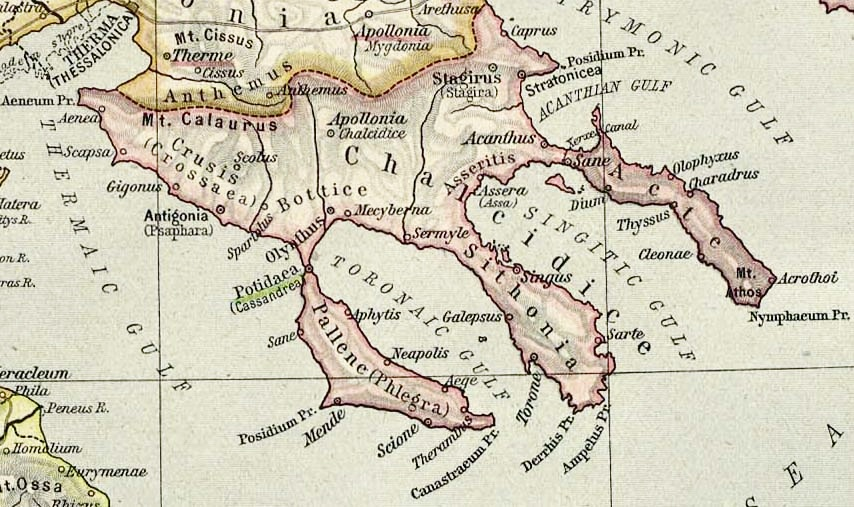
Map of ancient Chalcidice

== Name ==
Chalkidiki also spelled Halkidiki (/kælˈkɪdɪki/) or Chalcidice (/kælˈsɪdɪsi/) is named after the ancient Greek city-state of Chalcis in Euboea, which colonised the area in the 8th century BC.

== Geography ==
Chalkidiki consists of a large peninsula in the northwestern Aegean Sea, resembling a hand with three 'fingers' (though in Greek these peninsulas are often referred to as 'legs'). From west to east, these are Kassandra (highest peak 350 m), Sithonia (highest peak Mt Itamos 817 m), and Athos, a special polity within Greece known for its monasteries and its highest peak reaching 2,033 metres above sea level. These 'fingers' are separated by two gulfs, the Toronean Gulf and the Singitic Gulf.

Chalkidiki borders on the regional unit of Thessaloniki to the north, and is bounded by the Thermaic Gulf on the west, and the Strymonian Gulf and Ierissos Gulf on the east (which are separated by the Brostomnitsa peninsula).

The Cholomontas mountains lie in the north-central part of Chalkidiki, with the highest peak near Taxiarchis reaching 1,165 metres above sea level. The peak of Mt Kontari near Stagira reaches 921 metres. Chalkidiki has a few rivers running from Mt Cholomontas south to the sea, these include the Havrias, Vatonias (Olynthios) and Psychros rivers. Chalkidiki also has a few islands including the inhabited Ammouliani and Diaporos both in the Singitic Gulf, and the uninhabited Kelyfos island in the Toronean Gulf.

Its largest towns are Nea Moudania (Νέα Μουδανιά), Nea Kallikrateia (Νέα Καλλικράτεια) and the capital town of Polygyros (Πολύγυρος).

There are several summer resorts on the beaches of all three fingers where other minor towns and villages are located, such as at Yerakini (Gerakina Beach) and Psakoudia in central Chalkidiki, Kallithea, Chanioti and Pefkochori in the Kassandra peninsula, Nikiti and Neos Marmaras (Porto Carras) in the Sithonia peninsula, and Ouranoupolis at Mount Athos. A popular village in winter is Arnaia for its architecture and mountain scenery.

=== Climate ===
The climate of Chalkidiki is mainly Mediterranean (Koppen: Csa) with cool, wet winters and hot, relatively dry summers. Snowfalls are possible but not long-lasting during the winter months, while occasional thunderstorms may occur during the summer. Few areas such as Neos Marmaras have a hot semi-arid climate (Köppen climate classification: BSh).

Climate data for Neos Marmaras 6 m a.s.l.
Month	Jan	Feb	Mar	Apr	May	Jun	Jul	Aug	Sep	Oct	Nov	Dec	Year
Record high °C (°F)	20.7 (69.3)	22.8 (73.0)	22.8 (73.0)	26.5 (79.7)	32.4 (90.3)	36.4 (97.5)	39.9 (103.8)	41.6 (106.9)	37.0 (98.6)	29.3 (84.7)	26.1 (79.0)	19.8 (67.6)	41.6 (106.9)
Mean daily maximum °C (°F)	12.2 (54.0)	14.1 (57.4)	15.6 (60.1)	19.5 (67.1)	24.3 (75.7)	29.3 (84.7)	32.1 (89.8)	32.4 (90.3)	27.8 (82.0)	22.2 (72.0)	18.1 (64.6)	14.0 (57.2)	21.8 (71.2)
Daily mean °C (°F)	9.4 (48.9)	11.0 (51.8)	12.2 (54.0)	15.4 (59.7)	20.0 (68.0)	24.9 (76.8)	27.7 (81.9)	28.0 (82.4)	23.9 (75.0)	18.9 (66.0)	15.2 (59.4)	11.3 (52.3)	18.2 (64.7)
Mean daily minimum °C (°F)	6.5 (43.7)	7.9 (46.2)	8.7 (47.7)	11.3 (52.3)	15.6 (60.1)	20.5 (68.9)	23.2 (73.8)	23.6 (74.5)	20.0 (68.0)	15.6 (60.1)	12.2 (54.0)	8.6 (47.5)	14.5 (58.1)
Record low °C (°F)	−4.2 (24.4)	−0.5 (31.1)	0.6 (33.1)	4.2 (39.6)	10.5 (50.9)	13.1 (55.6)	16.3 (61.3)	18.6 (65.5)	13.2 (55.8)	9.9 (49.8)	3.7 (38.7)	−0.6 (30.9)	−4.2 (24.4)
Average rainfall mm (inches)	62.4 (2.46)	28.9 (1.14)	50.1 (1.97)	27.4 (1.08)	21.7 (0.85)	33.9 (1.33)	28.0 (1.10)	11.6 (0.46)	29.5 (1.16)	36.8 (1.45)	41.8 (1.65)	60.3 (2.37)	432.4 (17.02)
Source: National Observatory of Athens (Feb 2014 – Jul 2024), Neos Marmaras N.O.A station and World Meteorological Organization

== History ==
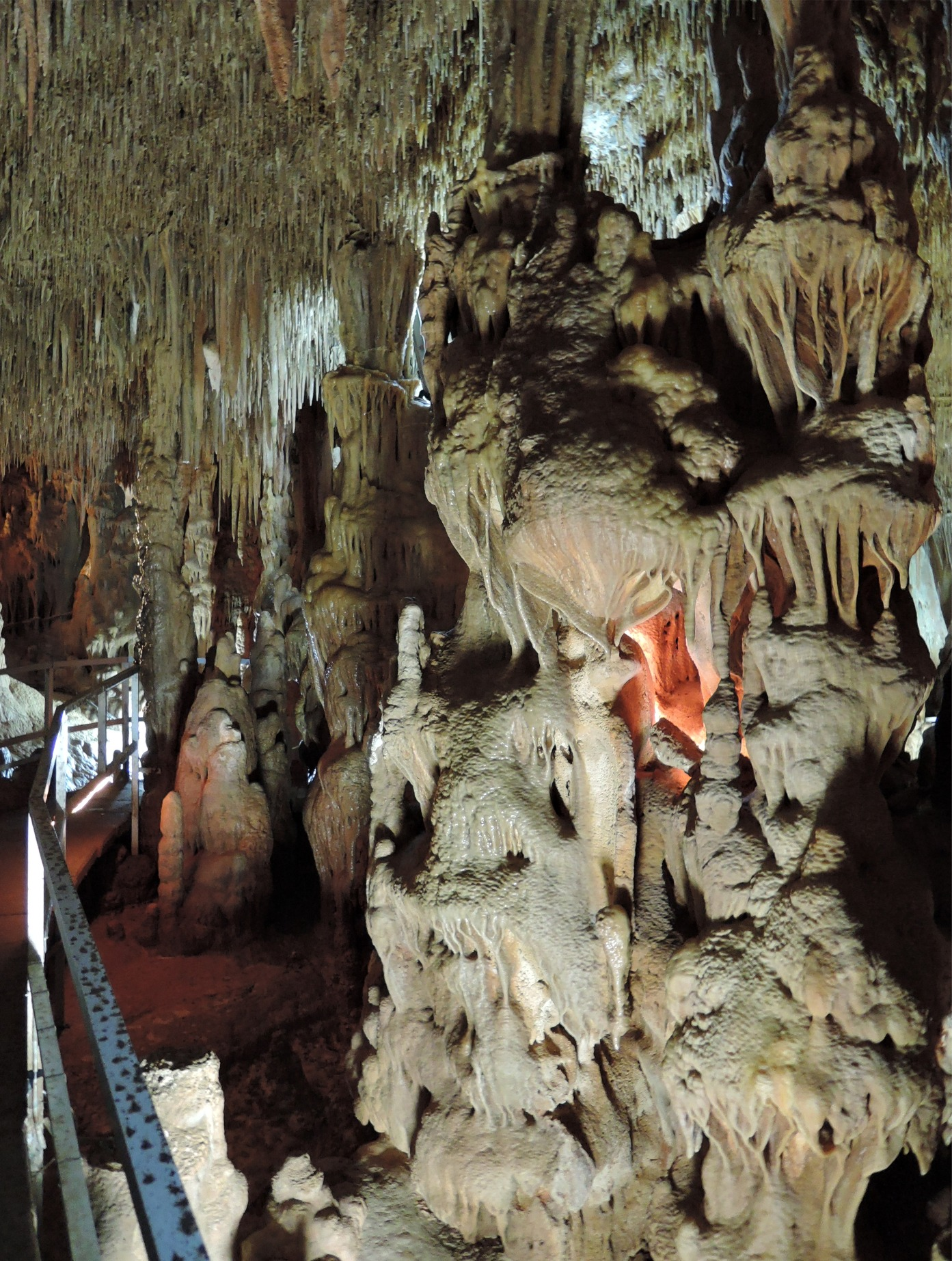
Petralona cave formations

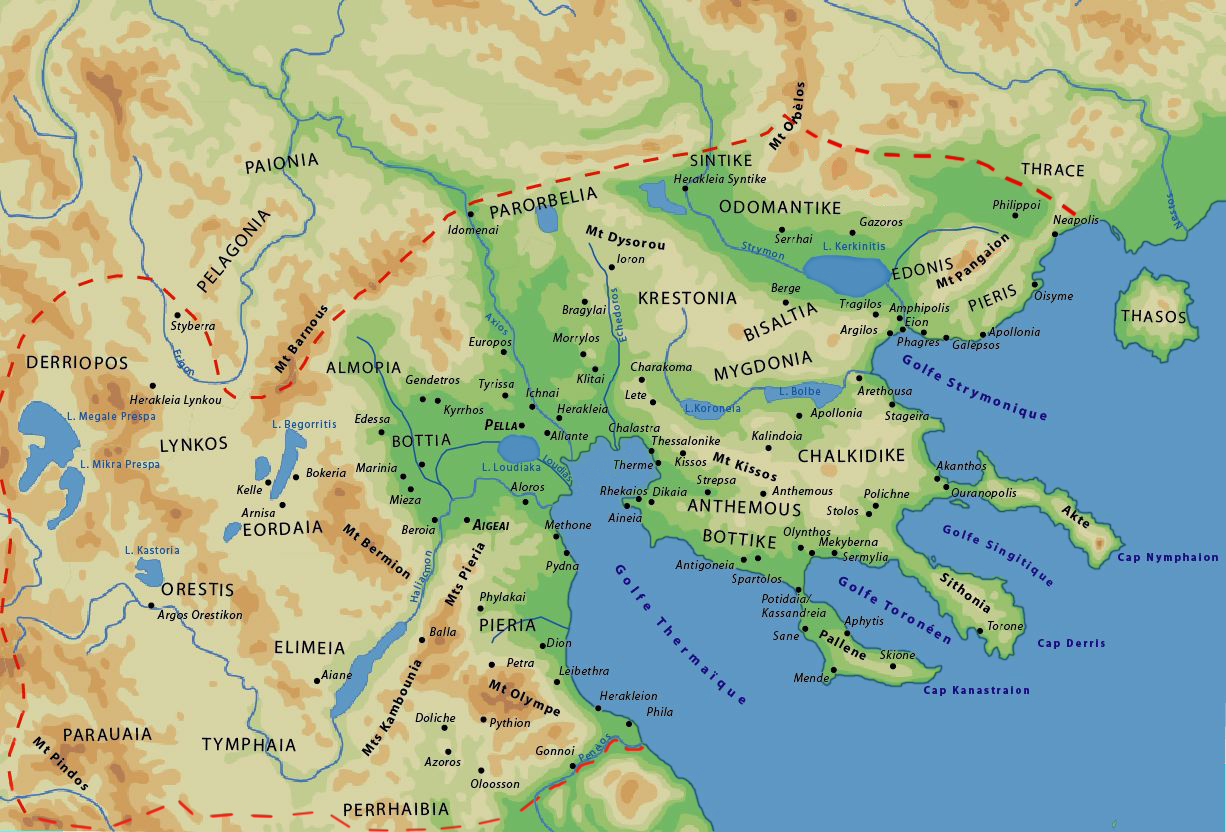
Map of the Kingdom of Macedon, with Chalkidiki shown among the other districts of the kingdom

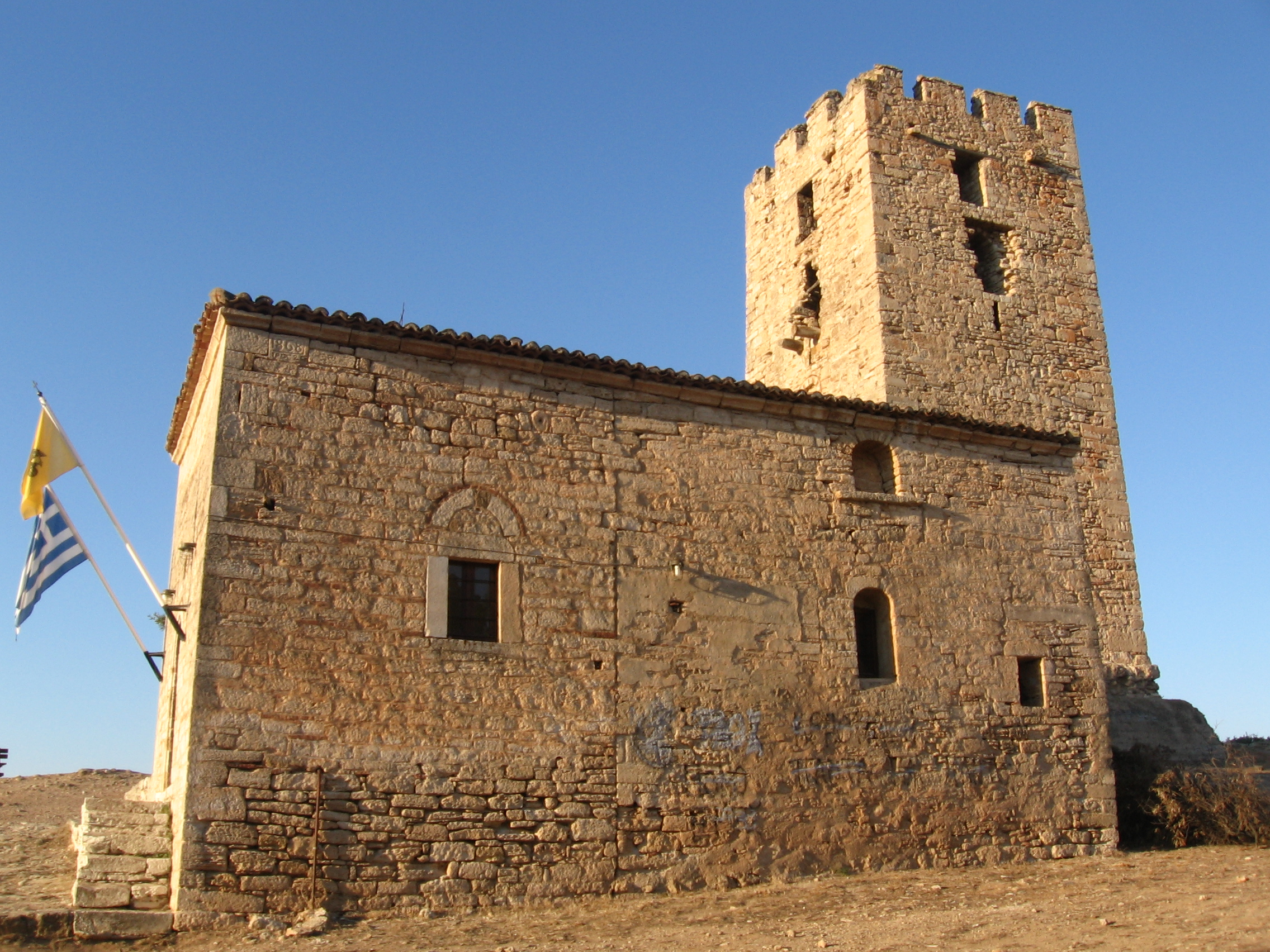
Byzantine tower, Nea Fokea

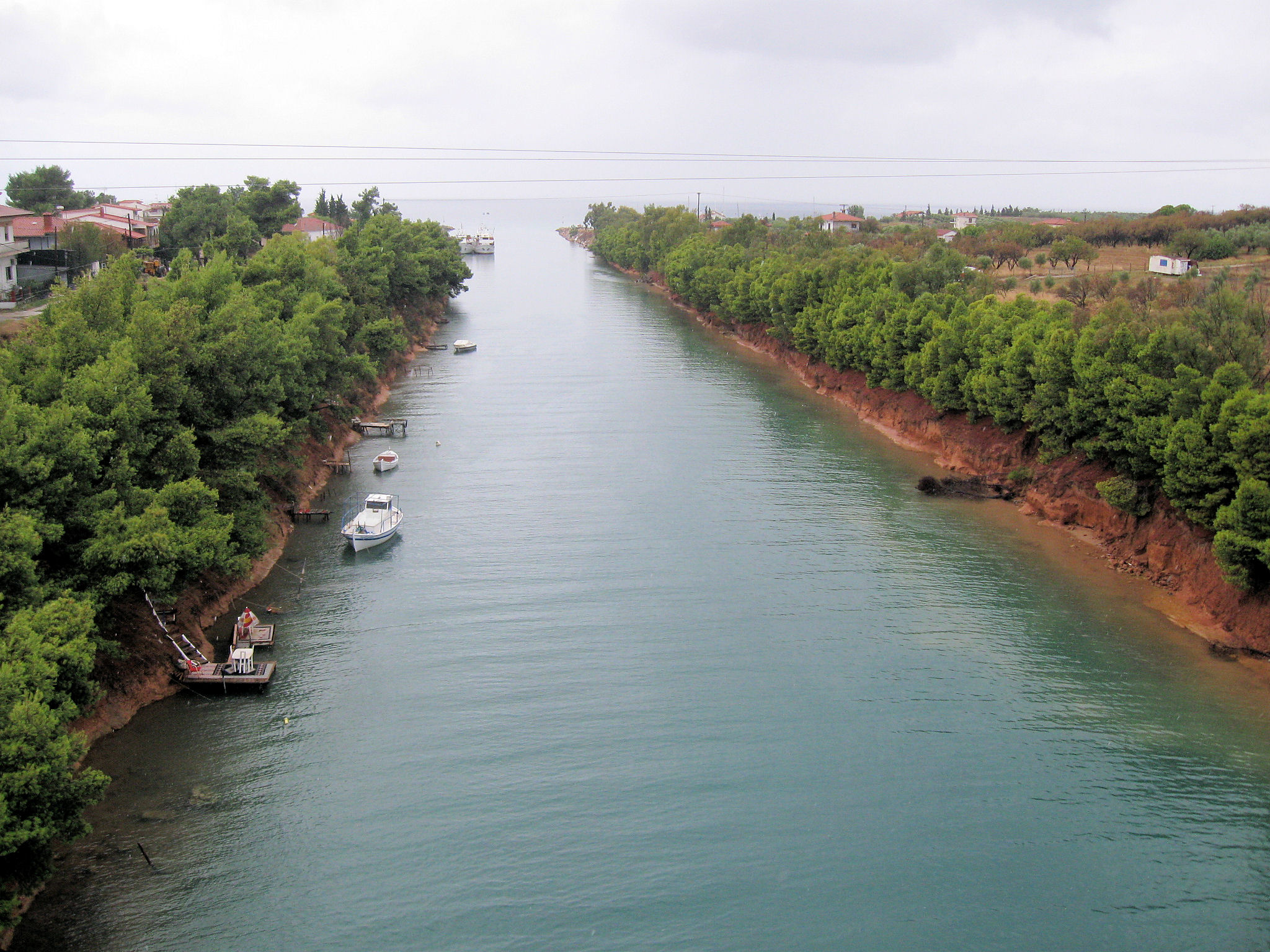
Potidea canal

=== Ancient ===
The first Greek settlers in this area came from Chalcis and Eretria, ancient Ionian cities in Euboea, around the 8th century BC who founded cities such as Mende, Toroni and Scione. A second wave came from Andros in the 6th century BC who founded cities such as Akanthos. Halkidiki became an important theatre of the Peloponnesian War between Athens and Sparta. Stageira was the birthplace of the great philosopher Aristotle.

Later, the whole peninsula was annexed by Philip II and it became part of Macedon, while Aristotle became the tutor of Philip's son, Alexander the Great. After the death of Alexander the Great, the peninsula was part of Macedon ruled by the Antipatrid and then the Antigonid dynasties. After the end of the wars between the Macedonians and the Romans, the Macedonian kingdom became part of the Roman empire, along with the rest of Greece. At the end of the Roman Republic (in 43 BC) a Roman colony was settled in Cassandreia, which was later (in 30 BC) resettled by Augustus.

=== Medieval ===
During the following centuries, Chalkidiki was part of the Byzantine theme of Thessalonica. On a chrysobull of Emperor Basil I, dated 885, the Holy Mountain (Mount Athos) was proclaimed a place of monks, and no laymen or farmers or cattle-breeders were allowed to be settled there. With the support of Nikephoros II Phokas, the Great Lavra monastery was founded soon afterwards. Athos with its monasteries has been self-governing ever since. Today, over 2,000 monks from Greece and many other Orthodox Christian countries, such as Romania, Moldova, Georgia, Bulgaria, Serbia, and Russia, live an ascetic life in Athos, isolated from the rest of the world.

After a short period of domination by the Latin Kingdom of Thessalonica, the area became again Byzantine until its conquest by the Ottomans in 1430. During the Ottoman period, the peninsula was important for its gold mining.

=== Modern ===
In 1821, the Greek War of Independence started and the Greeks of Chalkidiki revolted under the command of Emmanouel Pappas, a member of Filiki Eteria, and other local fighters. The revolt was progressing slowly and unsystematically. The insurrection was confined to the peninsulas of Mount Athos and Kassandra. One of the main goals was to restrain and detain the coming of the Ottoman army from Constantinople, until the revolution in the south, mainly in the Peloponnese, became stable. Finally, the revolt resulted in a decisive Ottoman victory at Kassandra. The survivors, among them Pappas, were rescued by the Psarian fleet, which took them mainly to Skiathos, Skopelos and Skyros. The Ottomans proceeded in retaliation and many villages were burnt.

Finally, the peninsula was incorporated into the Greek Kingdom in 1912-1913 after the Macedonian Struggle and the Balkan Wars. Many Greek refugees from East Thrace and Anatolia (modern Turkey) were settled in parts of Chalkidiki after the 1923 population exchange between Greece and Turkey, adding to the indigenous Greek population.

In the 1980s, a tourism boom came to Chalkidiki and took over agriculture as the primary industry. In June 2003, at the holiday resort of Porto Carras located in Neos Marmaras, Sithonia, leaders of the European Union presented the first draft of the European Constitution (see History of the European Constitution for developments after this point).

=== Ancient sites ===
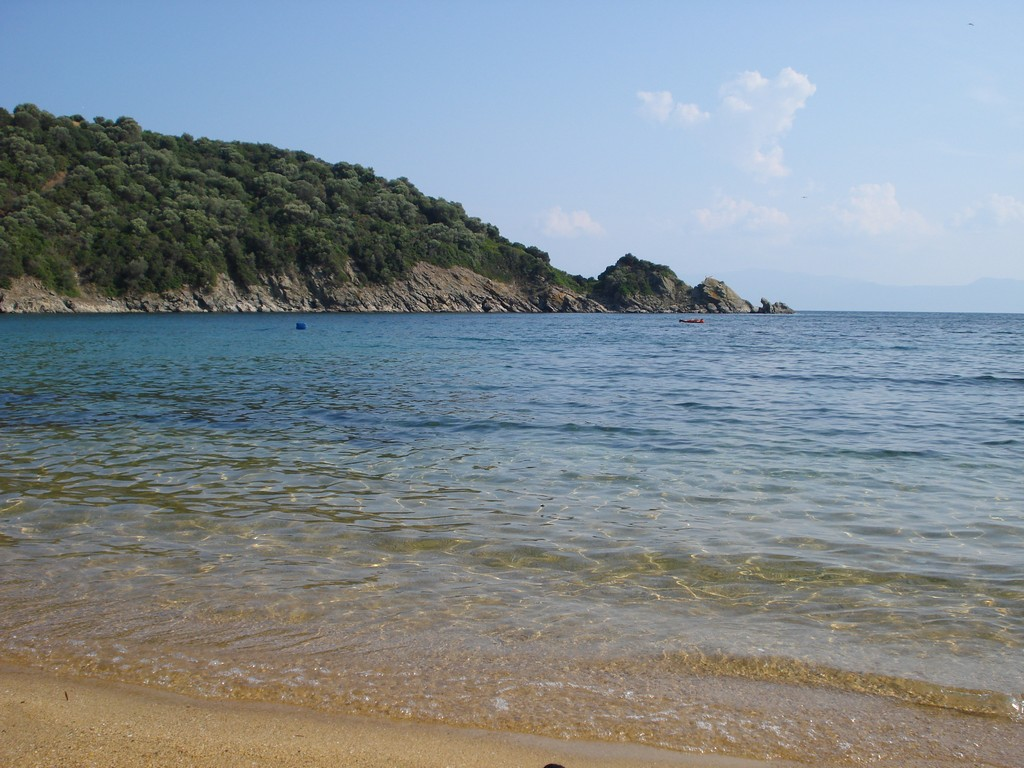
View of Ammouliani island

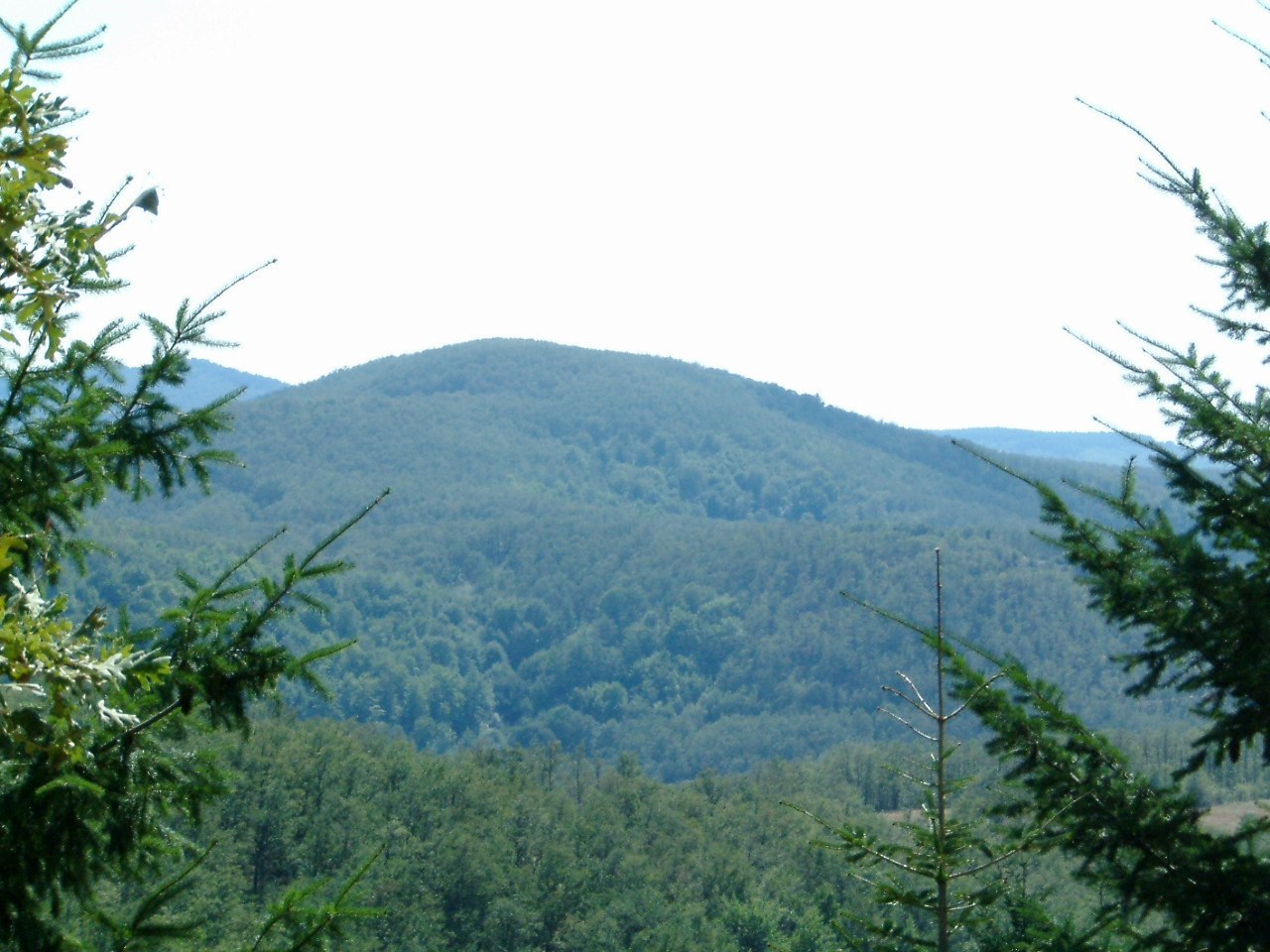
Cholomontas mountain

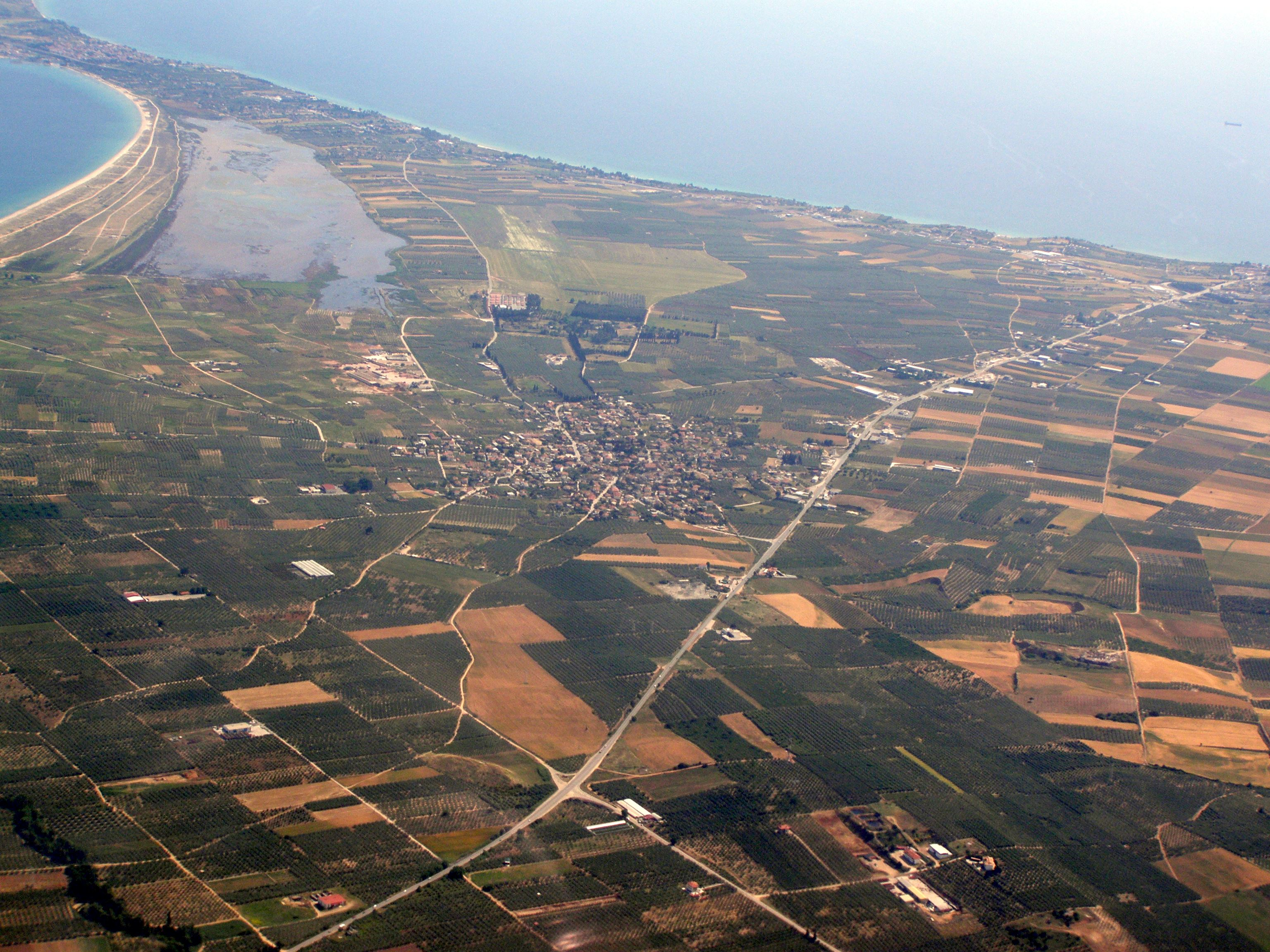
Aerial view of Agios Mamas village (Saint Mammes)

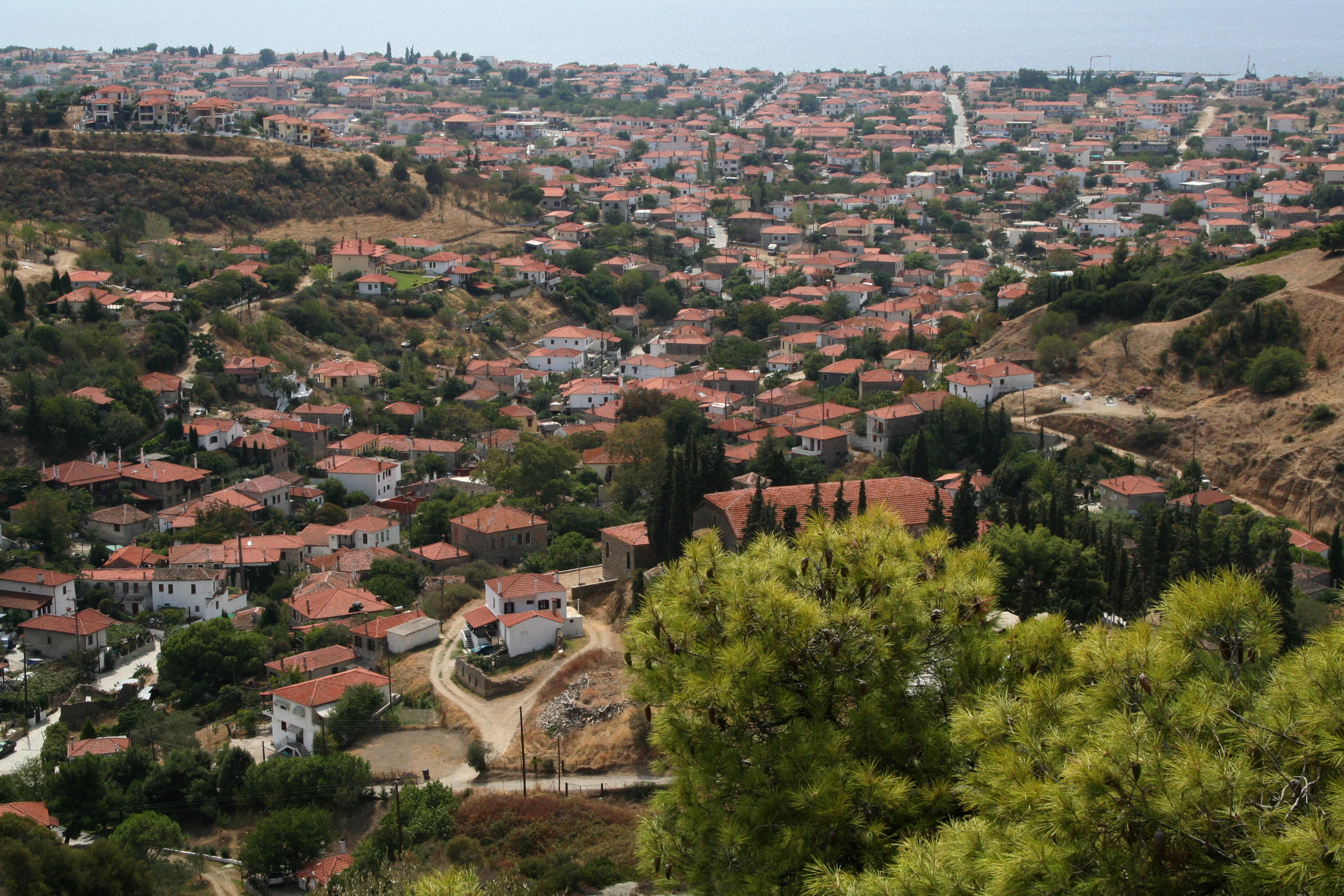
Nikiti village

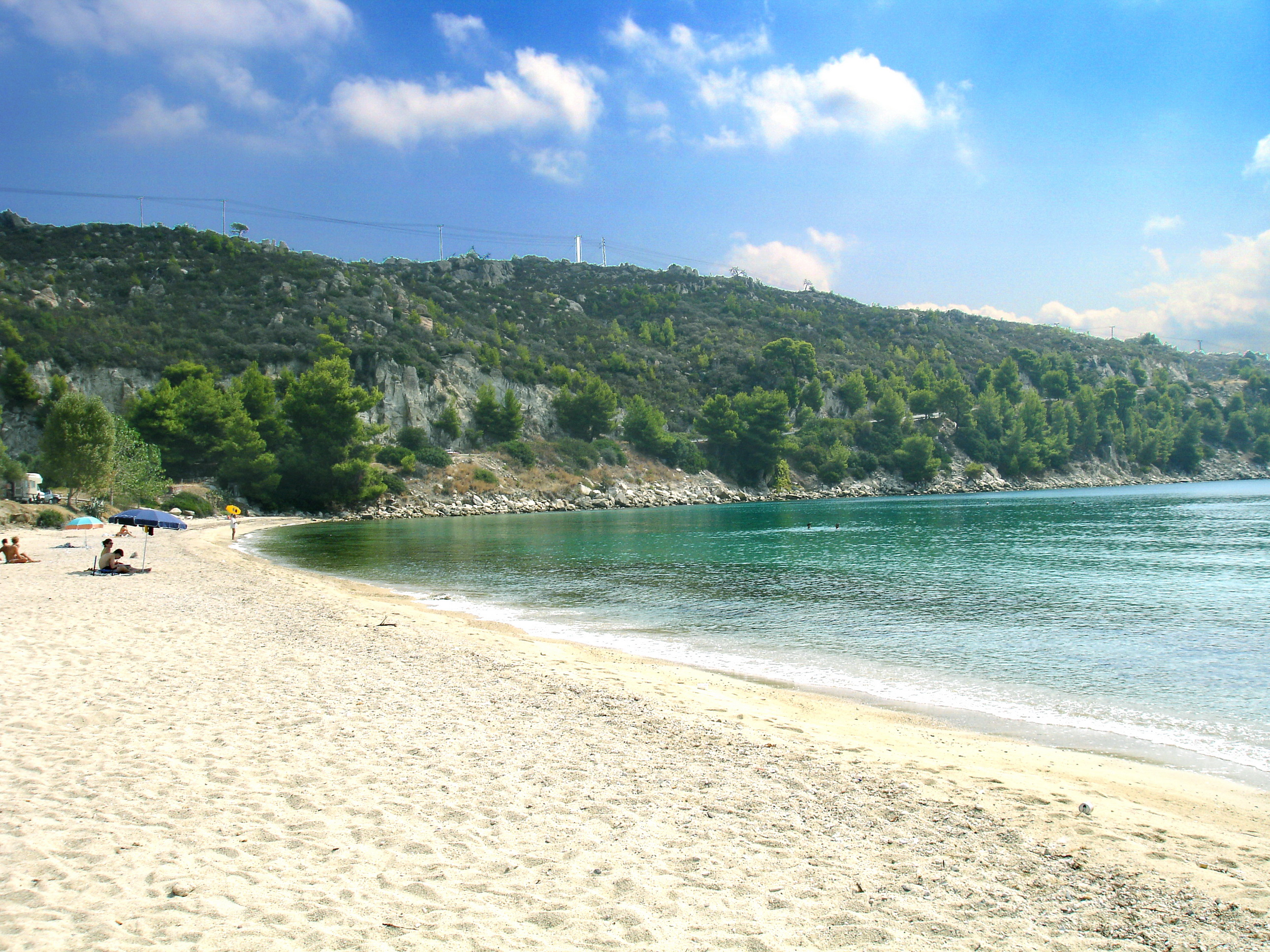
St. John beach

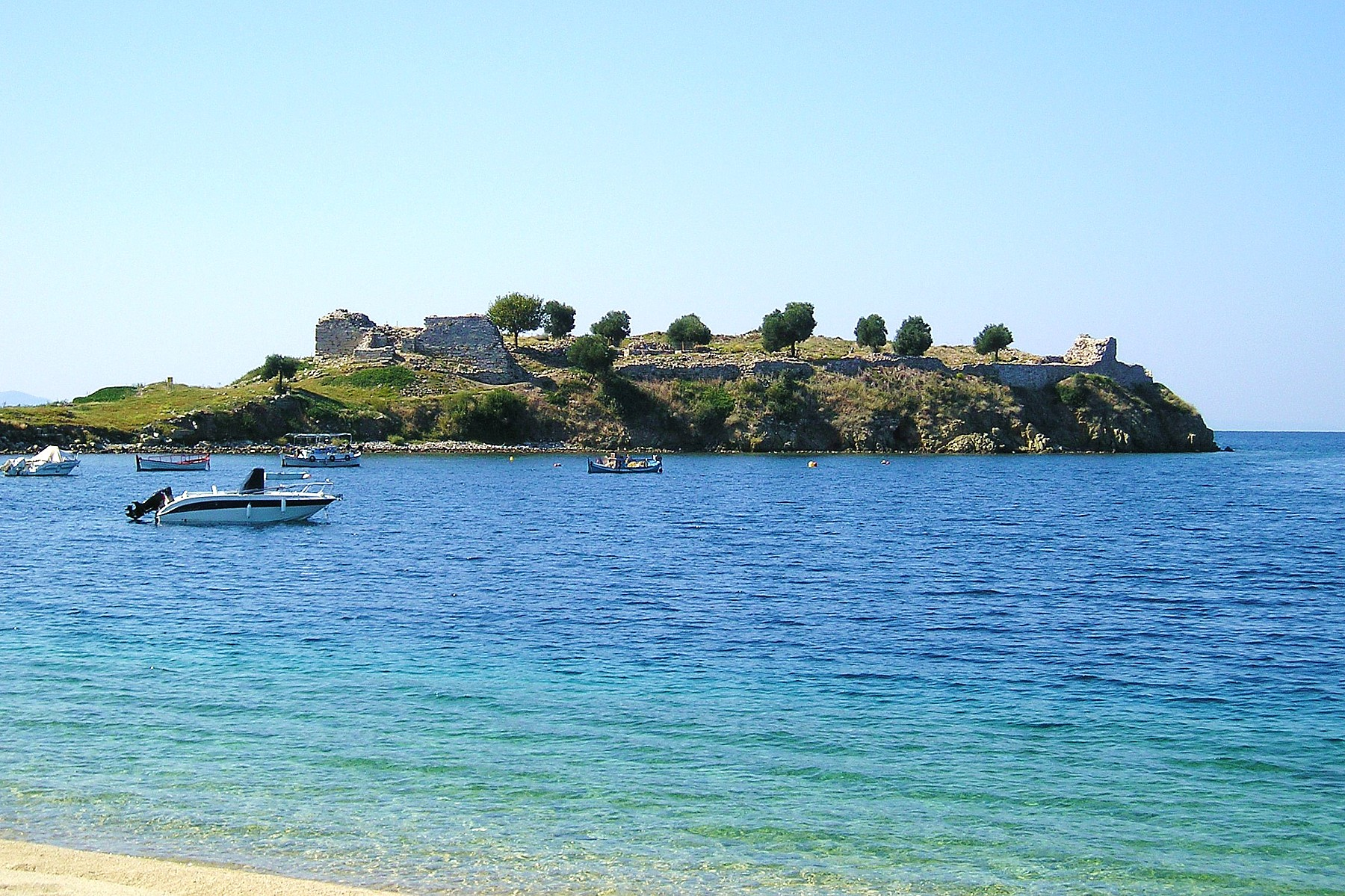
Beach in Toroni

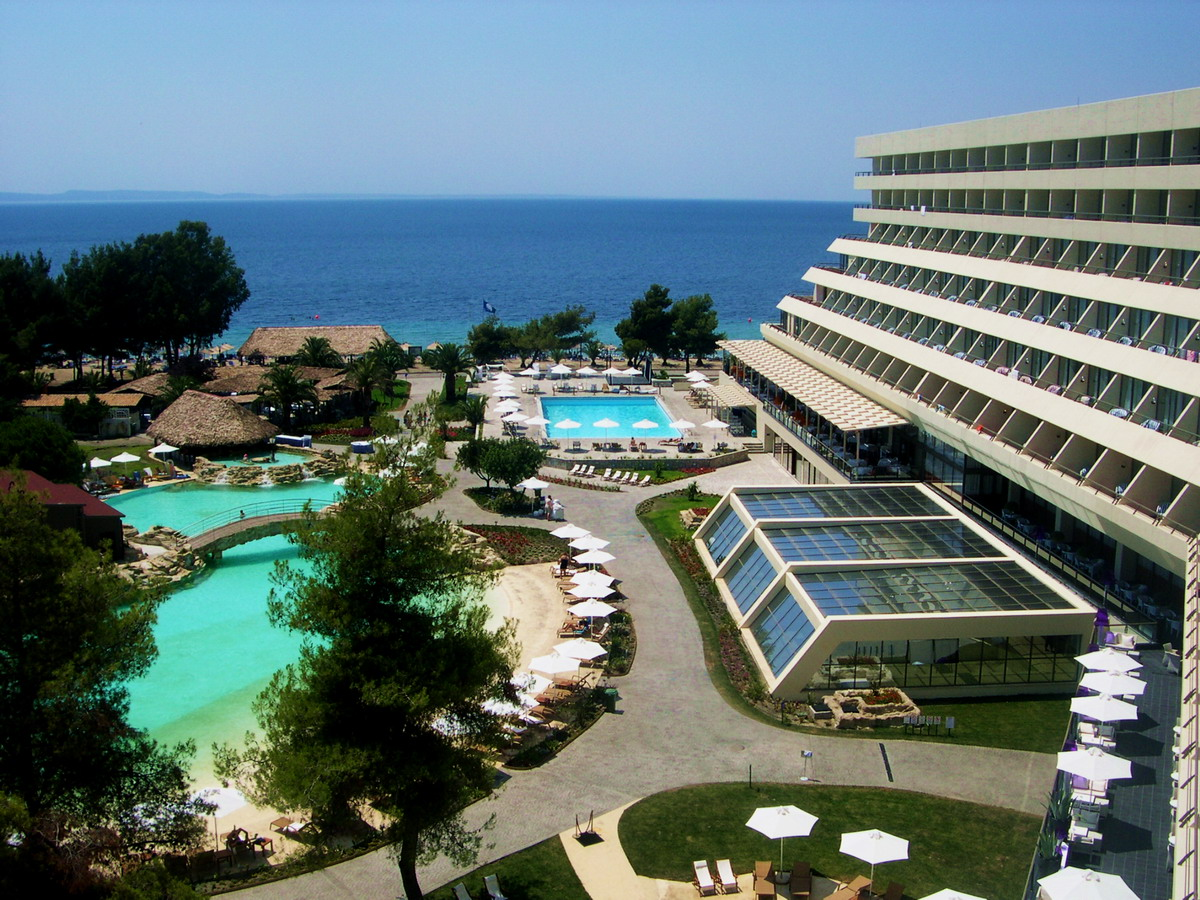
Exterior view of Porto Carras Hotel in Sithonia

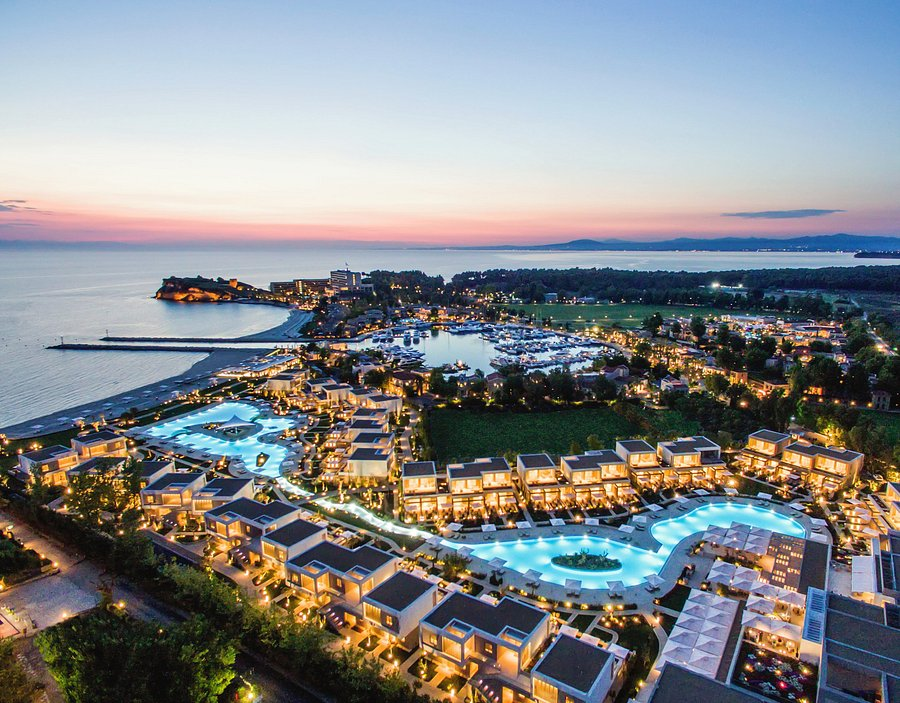
Sani Resort in Sani, Chalkidiki

- Acanthus (near Ierissos)
- Acrothoi
- Aege
- Alapta
- Aphytis (Afytos)
- Apollonia (near Polygyros)
- Cleonae (Chalcidice)
- Galepsus
- Mekyberna
- Mende
- Neapolis, Chalcidice
- Olophyxus
- Olynthus
- Palaiochori "Neposi" castle
- Polichrono
- Potidaea
- Scione
- Scolus
- Sermylia (Ormylia)
- Stageira
- Spartolus
- Thyssus
- Torone
- Treasury of the Acanthians
- Xerxes Canal

== Archaeology ==
In June 2022, archaeologists announced the discovery of a poorly preserved single-edged sabre among the ruins of a monastery on the coast of Chalcidice. Alongside the curved sword, excavators revealed evidence of a fire, a large cache of 14th-century glazed pottery vessels, as well as other weapons, including axes and arrowheads.

== Economy ==
=== Agriculture ===
The peninsula is notable for its olive oil and its green olives production. Also various types of honey and wine are produced.

=== Tourism ===
Chalkidiki has been a popular summer tourist destination since the late 1950s when people from Thessaloniki started spending their summer holidays in the coastal villages. In the beginning tourists rented rooms in the houses of locals. By the 1960s, tourists from Austria and Germany started to visit Chalkidiki more frequently. Since the start of the big tourist boom in the 1970s, the whole region has been captured by tourism. In the region there is a golf course, with plans for four others in the future.

=== Mining ===
Gold was mined in the region during antiquity by Philip II of Macedon and the next rulers. Since 2013, a revival of mining for gold and other minerals has occurred, and a number of concessions have been granted to Eldorado Gold of Canada. Critics claim that mining adversely affects tourism and the environment. Plus, the movement took panhellenic and international affection in the name of "Chalkidiki SOS" with major strikes and protests at European capitals during the years.

== Administration ==
The Chalkidiki regional unit is subdivided into five municipalities (numbered as in the infobox map):

- Aristotelis (2)
- Kassandra (4)
- Nea Propontida (3)
- Polygyros (1)
- Sithonia (5)

=== Prefecture ===
As a part of Greece's 2011 local government reform, the Chalkidiki regional unit (περιφερειακή ενότητα, perifereiakí enótita) was created out of the former Chalkidiki prefecture (νομός, nomós); the regional unit has the same territory as the former prefecture. As part of the reforms, Chalkidiki's five municipalities (δήμοι, dhími) were created by combining former municipalities, which were in turn demoted to municipal units (δημοτικές ενότητες, dhimotikés enótites), according to the table below.

Municipalities	Municipal Units (Note: Prior to the implementation of the Kallikratis Plan these municipal units were municipalities.)	Seat
Aristotelis	Arnaia	Ierissos
Aristotelis	Panagia	Ierissos
Aristotelis	Stagira-Akanthos	Ierissos
Kassandra	Kassandra	Kassandreia
Kassandra	Pallini	Kassandreia
Nea Propontida	Kallikrateia	Nea Moudania
Nea Propontida	Moudania	Nea Moudania
Nea Propontida	Triglia	Nea Moudania
Polygyros	Polygyros	Polygyros
Polygyros	Anthemountas	Polygyros
Polygyros	Zervochoria	Polygyros
Polygyros	Ormylia	Polygyros
Sithonia	Sithonia	Nikiti
Sithonia	Toroni	Nikiti

=== Provinces ===
Before the abolishment of the provinces of Greece in 2006, the Chalkidiki prefecture was subdivided into the following provinces:

Province	Seat
Arnaia Province	Arnaia
Chalkidiki Province	Polygyros

== Population ==
The autonomous monastic state of Mount Athos which is often considered to be geographically part of Chalkidiki recorded an additional 1,746 people in the 2021 census. The population is mostly Orthodox Christian monks.

Historical population
Year	Pop.	±%
1991	85,471	—
2001	96,849	+13.3%
2011	105,908	+9.4%
2021	102,085	−3.6%

== Television ==
- TV Halkidiki – Nea Moudania
- Super TV – Nea Moudania

== Transport ==
- Makedonia Airport, Thessaloniki
- Motorways:
  - A24 motorway connects Thessaloniki and "Macedonia" Airport with Nea Moudania and Kallithea in Kassandra.
- Chalkidiki has no railroads or airports.
- A bus system, KTEL, serves major towns.

In September 2018 it was announced that Line 2 of the Thessaloniki Metro could be extended in the future in order to serve commuters to and from some areas of Chalkidiki.

== Notable inhabitants ==
Bust of Aristotle in National Museum of Rome.

- Paeonius of Mende (late 5th century BC), sculptor
- Philippus of Mende, Plato's student, astronomer
- Nicomachus, Aristotle's father
- Aristobulus of Cassandreia (375–301 BC), historian, architect
- Aristotle (384 BC in Stageira–322 BC), philosopher
- Andronicus of Olynthus (c. 370 BC), Phrourarchus of Tyre, appointed by Antigonus
- Callisthenes (360–328 BC), historian
- Crates of Olynthus, Alexander's hydraulic engineer
- Bubalus of Cassandreia (304 BC), keles (horse) competing in the flat race of the Lykaia
- Poseidippus of Cassandreia (c. 310–240 BC), comic poet
- Erginus (son of Simylus) from Cassandreia, citharede winner in Soteria c. 260 BC
- Konstantinos Doumbiotis (1793-1848), revolutionary of the Greek War of Independence
- Stamatios Kapsas, revolutionary of the Greek War of Independence
- Xenophon Paionidis (1863–1933), architect
- Manolis Mitsias, singer
- Sokratis Malamas (1957 in Sykia), singer
- Paola Foka (1982 Sykia), singer

== See also ==
- List of settlements in Chalkidiki
- Lower Macedonia
- Empire of Thessalonica
- Vavdos Folklore Collection
