= Pallini, Chalkidiki =

Pallini Παλλήνη
- Municipal unit
- Location within the regional unit

- Location within Greece
- Coordinates: 40°00′N 23°34′E
- Country: Greece
- Administrative region: Central Macedonia
- Regional unit: Chalkidiki
- Municipality: Kassandra

Area
  - Municipal unit: 128.2 km^{2} (49.5 sq mi)

Population (2021)
  - Municipal unit: 6,335
  - Municipal unit density: 49.41/km^{2} (128.0/sq mi)
- Time zone: UTC+2 (EET)
  - Summer (DST): UTC+3 (EEST)
- Vehicle registration: ΧΚ

Pallini (Greek: Παλλήνη) was a municipality in Chalkidiki, Greece. Since the 2011 local government reform it is part of the municipality Kassandra, of which it is a municipal unit. The municipal unit has an area of 128.183 km^{2}. Population 6,335 (2021). The seat of the municipality was in Chaniotis.
