= Akanthos (Greece) =

Ancient Greek city

- Ἄκανθος (Ancient Greek)
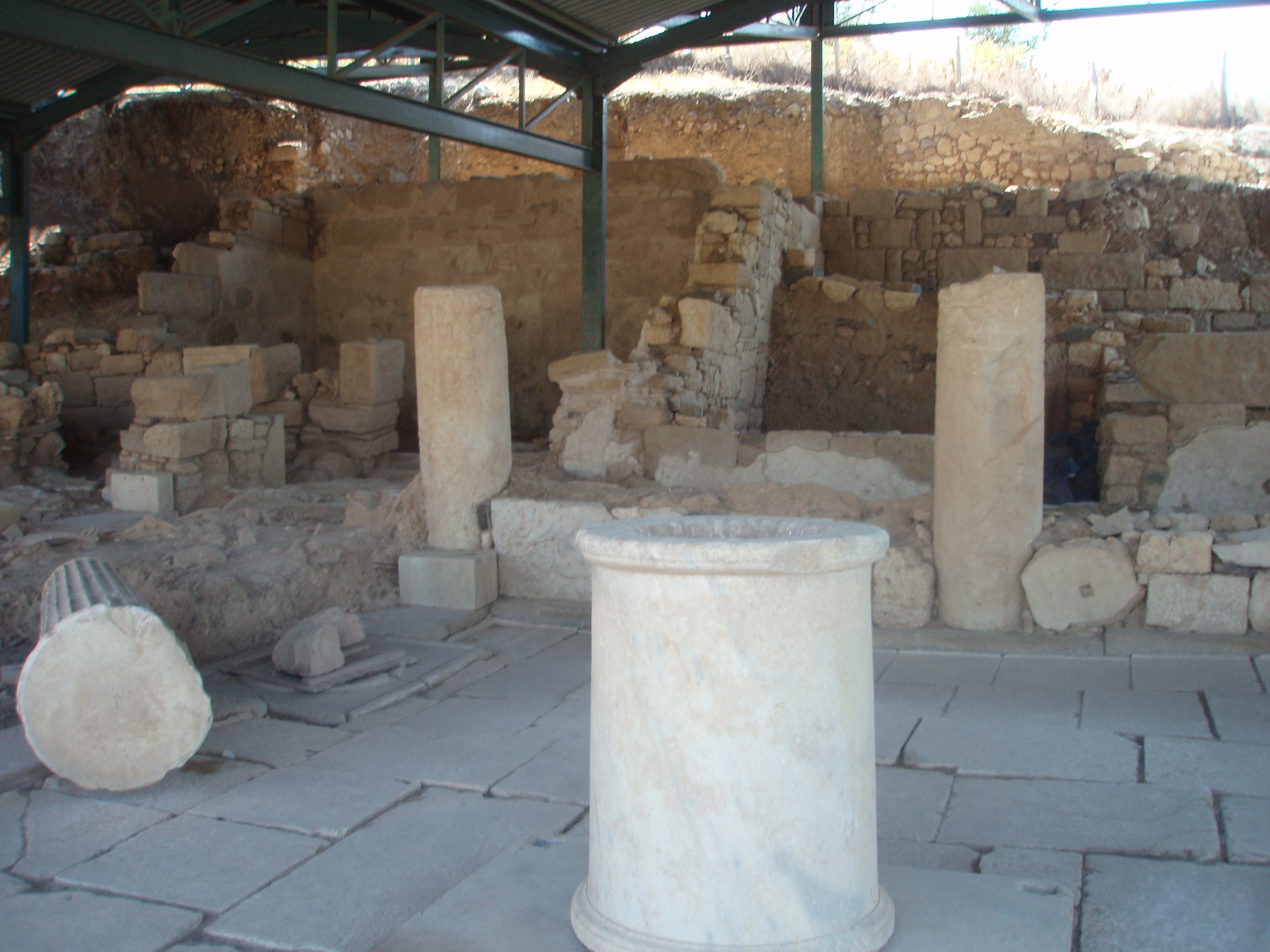
- Remains of an ancient house excavated in Akanthos

- Location within Greece
- 40°23′27″N 23°53′10″E
- Type: Colonial settlement, independent city-state (polis)
- Periods: Geometric, Archaic, Classical, Hellenistic, Byzantine
- Cultures: Hellenic
- Associated with: Hellenes
- Location: Ierissos, Central Macedonia, Greece
- Region: Chalcidice (Modern Greek Halkidiki)

History
- Built: 7th century BCE
- Abandoned: 6th century CE

Site notes
- Height: 20 metres (66 ft)
- Area: 560 acres
- Condition: Ruined
- Owner: Public
- Management: Ephorate of Antiquities of Chalcidice and Mount Athos
- Public access: Yes
- Website: "Acanthus". Odysseus: Archaeological Sites. Hellenic Republic, Ministry of Culture and Sports. 2012.
- For a site such as Akanthos, which extended over hills, topographical data is apt to be variable or uncertain. The area, for example, depends on which area is to be considered: the walled city, or the limits of the city-state, etc. The altitude varied. The figures given here are estimates from the sources, probably the hilly region and maximum elevation.

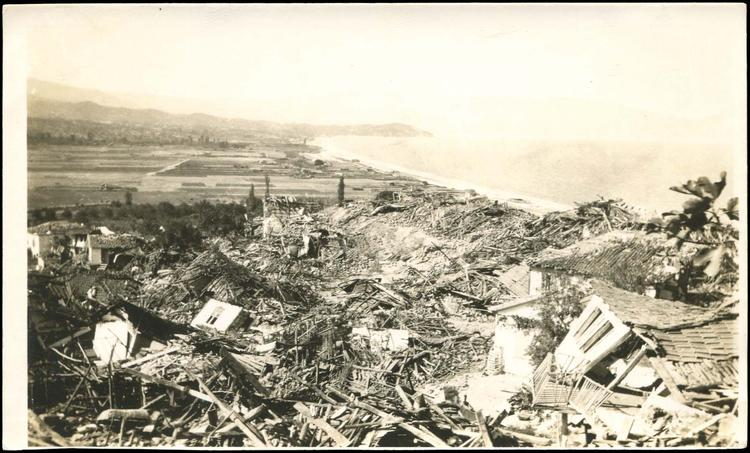
View of old Ierissos on top of the ancient akropolis of Akanthos, after the earthquake. The site of new Ierissos is visible in the valley in the background, still given to agricultural uses.

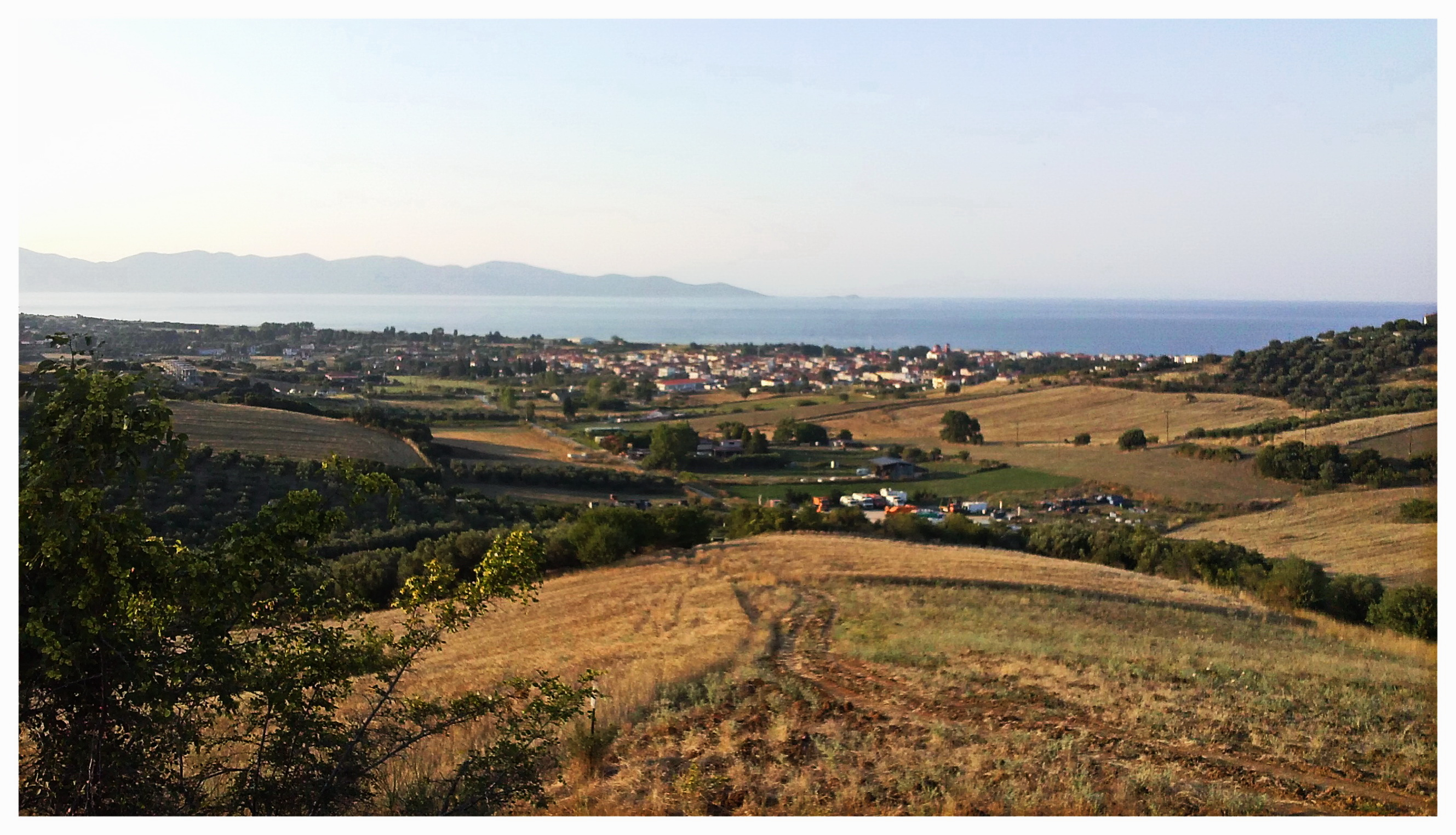
View of Ierissos showing the Akanthos site in the foreground and to the extreme right.

Akanthos (Ancient Greek: Ἄκανθος; Latin: Acanthus) was an ancient Greek city on the Athos peninsula, on the narrow neck of land between the sacred mountain and the mainland, to the northwest of the Xerxes Canal. It was founded in the 7th century BCE as a colony of Andros, itself a colony of Chalcis in Euboea. Chalcidice was multi-cultural. The archaeology of the region suggests that some Hellenes were already there. The site is on the north-east side of Akti, on the most eastern peninsula of Chalcidice.

The ancient city extended along a ridge comprising three hills bordering the south-east of modern Ierissos about 0.6 km (2,000 ft) from it. The ridge dominates the landscape. It is terminated on the north by the coastal road (Vasileos Konstantinou) and the beach between Ierissos and its harbor. The modern city is about equal in size to the ancient site, which is now partially wooded. Remains of an 8 m (26 ft) high circuit wall, a citadel, and Hellenistic buildings are visible embedded in the terrain, along with a deserted Byzantine church and two post Byzantine churches.

The name selected for the colony is a phytoname, the name of a plant. The plant would most likely be Acanthus mollis, which abounds on the Mediterranean rocky coasts. Pomponius Mela says that it grew on the coast between the River Strymon and Athos. The plant, a thorny, flowering perennial, was known for its medicinal powers. It is the model for the plant design used on Corinthian capitals.

The prosperous and successful city in the course of time became a part of the Byzantine Empire. In the 6th century CE the empire declined due to devastation of its population by plague, starting about 541. The peninsula was abandoned by the Hellenes only to be gradually repopulated by Slavs. In the 9th century the Byzantines recovered and reoccupied the peninsula, bringing in Hellenes and Armenians from Asia Minor. They were protected in Roman-style fortified towns called kastra. One of these was Erissos, placed over the site of Akanthos. After it became the site of a Bishopric, Erissos was changed to Ierissos by analogy with Hieros, "sacred."

There is an etymology for Erissos as follows. The Marble of Ladiava, an inscription from Ierissos, reports the presence of a large community of Roman merchants, 27 BCE–14 CE. They chose to call Akanthos, etymologically "spiny," Echinia, "hedgehog." In the course of time Echinia came to mean "sea urchin," which also is spiny. The Roman colony disappeared along with the Greek city in the 6th century. When the Byzantines returned they chose the Latin form of the word, Ericius, which became Erissos by palatalization of the "c."

In 1430 Thessaloniki fell to Murad II, bringing Macedonia finally under the Ottoman Empire. Before then it had changed hands among the Ottomans, the Byzantines, and the Republic of Venice, since the late 14th century. The native population fleeing the city were pursued and brought back by the Turkish army. Subsequently, the city was augmented by the forced transplantation of Yuruk tribesmen from Anatolia, semi-nomads who kept sheep, practicing transhumance over the grasslands of Halkidiki, The region had been gradually deforested during the Byzantine era. The Ottoman rulers left Halkidiki in the hands of the monastic communities of Athos, whom they encouraged and allowed to rule.

Despite vigorous revolutionary activity in the Greek War of Independence of 1821, Macedonia, of which Halkidiki was a part, was forced to remain under the empire. In 1912 the Kingdom of Greece combined with other Balkan states to liberate Macedonia from Ottoman rule in the Balkan Wars. Macedonia was then divided among the victors, Greece receiving south Macedonia, with Thessaloniki and Halkidiki. In 1922 the Turkish people abolished the empire in favor of the Turkish Republic. In the 1923 population exchange consequent on the border settlement with Greece, Ierissos received an influx of Anatolian Greeks.

In 1932 a major earthquake devastated the village beyond re-use. It became "old Ierissos" as opposed to "new Ierissos" subsequently constructed in the valley below the hill. Unknown to the builders, the valley floor is the site of an ancient cemetery in use since before the founding of Akanthos, not abandoned until the 17th century CE. The new Ierissos is a flourishing city, architecturally in the style of the 1930s. The municipal arrangements of modern Greece have changed a number of times since then. More recently, the fact that Stagira, named for ancient Stagira, is in the vicinity stimulated the creation of the municipality, Stagira-Akanthos. In 2011 the name was changed to Aristotelis in honor of the Stagirite philosopher, Aristotle.

== Archaeology ==
=== Archaeological services in Macedonia ===
The Akanthos site and monuments are officially known (in English translation) as the Archaeological Site of Akanthos (see the website given in the box). Excavation and administration (archaeological services) are conducted by, and are under the authority of, the Hellenic Ministry of Culture and Sports through its departments. Currently (2018) the relevant departments, or ephorates, are under the Directorate of Prehistoric and Classical Antiquities, which is under the General Directorate of Antiquities and Cultural Heritage, which is under the General Secretary of Culture, which is under the Minister of Culture and Sports. The department with the responsibility of guidance and oversight of the site is the Ephorate of Antiquity of Chalcidice and Mount Athos, which has a list of responsibilities including the monasteries, and the sites of Akanthos, Olynthos, and Stageira. These assignments supersede previous arrangements, which might be cited in literature and on the Internet, such as 16th Ephorate of Prehistoric and Classical Antiquities, Thessaloniki, which is no more.

The archaeological ephorates of Macedonia began in the Balkan Wars, starting in 1912. There was already considerable international interest in the antiquities of Macedonia. The Ottoman Empire was supporting some rescue archaeology. For example, when an earthquake caused an opening to appear in a tumulus at Derveni, suggesting the impending collapse of a structure underneath, the Ottomans assigned Makridi Bey (Bey is a Turkish title), ethnically an Ottoman Greek, Theodoros Makridis, who had been at Hattusas, to excavate it.

He never got a chance to finish it. In 1912 a Greek expeditionary army entered Macedonia. Among them were volunteers who were Greek archaeologists. With the approval of the army, they took over all archaeology in Macedonia, collecting and storing ancient items, surveying sites, and doing preliminary excavation, with the assistance of other Greek soldiers. The new Governor-General of Macedonia created the first official Archaeological Service. The General Staff of the Army began to automatically assign soldier-archaeologists to it. On November 9, 1912, the office of Ephor of Antiquities of Thessaloniki was created, with George Oikonomou as ephor. He was also head of the Archaeological Service. Gradually additional ephorates were created, which were numbered, 2nd, 3rd, etc., using capital Greek letters for numbers. Each of the ephorates required a museum to house its artifacts.

The number of ancient sites to be protected and investigated is very large; the budget never seemed to be large enough, and there were never enough archaeologists to go around. The Archaeological Service accepted assistance from foreign institutions. A French mission had done some excavation for research under the Ottomans. French soldiers in Thessaloniki were glad to assist. The French Archaeological School of Athens had been formed and was active. Johns Hopkins and New York University undertook excavations. The Greek Archaeological Society of Athens and the University of Thessaloniki took a hand. By 1996 there were 25 ephorates of Prehistoric and Classical Archaeology in addition to others on related topics. In 2003 the ephorates were organized into eight directorates. The names and responsibilities of the ephorates require frequent adjustment to support the expanding archaeological investment. The names and numbers of museums also change frequently. Currently many of the artifacts from Halkidiki in general and Ierissos in particular are on display at the Archaeological Museum of Polygyros. Others are to be found in the Archaeological Museum of Thessaloniki.

=== Background to Chalcidic settlement ===
Chalcidice has been occupied since the Palaeolithic, the beginning of human culture, which started at about 3.3 MYA (million years ago). Whether it was continuous occupation for that length of time is not answered by the evidence, which is intermittent. Whether the intermittency belongs to the evidence or to the habitation is not yet known.

The major find site for the Palaeolithic is Petralona Cave, where the Petralona Skull was found, from a fully human Hominid believed to be ancestral (or close to it) to both modern and Neanderthal men. The date is the Middle Pleistocene (700,000–128,000 BP, or "before present"). Some assign it to the later Middle Pleistocene, 200,000–150,000 BCE, but a carbon date on the ashes of a fire yields 700,000 BCE. The fire is the earliest known one of human origin.

Mesolithic culture also is present. The Middle and Late Neolithic (5500–3000 BCE) are represented at sites near rivers. In the Bronze Age (3000–1100) site density increased. The sites have the form of tells, or mounds, which in this case result from the construction of successive mud-brick and wood houses over the same site. These are at seaside locations. The dead were deposited in distinct cemeteries, whether in burials or cremation urns. There is no evidence of ethnicity.

History begins in the Early Iron Age (1100–900 BCE). Thucydides mentions that, on the way home from Troy, a contingent from Pellene in Achaea of the Peloponnesus, driven to Chalcidice by a storm, deciding to stay, founded Skione, according to the Skionians, he says. The date is debatable, but if Troy fell in 1180 BCE, it would have been in the 12th century BCE. This is the first report of Hellenes in Chalcidice. The settlements of the period are on fortified heights (acropoli), whether on the coast or in the interior. The culture shows affinities to that of southern Greece. According to other sources, Chalcidice was also occupied by tribes of Thrace and other people of unknown language driven from Macedon by the Macedonians moving in.

=== The Akanthos site ===
After 1912 the fact that the Akanthos site was occupied by an inhabited village endowed it with a low archaeological priority. After 1932, the hills were open, but there was still little interest in improving the priority. In 1973 the priority changed suddenly with the discovery of the cemetery. A bulldozer preparing a site for new construction broke into a number of sarcophagi and shattered some pottery. Immediately the archaeological ephorate issued a non-development order, which it had the power to do, being a government agency, and conducted rescue archaeology on an emergency basis. This was the beginning of a systematic excavation that continues today, with no end in sight.

The rescue archaeology soon extended over a large number of graves. The total is not known for sure. Numbers vary from a mere 600 to as many as 60,000. Part of the problem is that over such a length of time graves were destroyed to make way for others, or were placed over others. A few general observations can be made. The earliest cemetery was placed further inland near the center of Ierissos, while the later were more toward the sea., and were aligned pointing to sea. Currently a number of chronological work areas are distinguished, the two main ones being the cemetery of Akanthos, and the medieval cemetery of Ierissos, discovered in 1984. The first contains tombs ranging in time from the Proto-Geometric Period through the abandonment, with the most from the classical centuries, the 5th and 4th BCE. The second contains the graves of mediaeval Ierissos, from the founding of the Kolovou Monastery on the hill in 883 CE, which made use of Greek and Slavic texts, to the 12th century CE, judging by the coins. The fact that some coins date from the 6th century suggests that the site was not entirely abandoned.

The graves are not spectacular find sites, compared to the tombs of chieftains, or monumental architecture, or hidden treasures of precious metals. The ordinary people were buried there in a variety of coffins or ash containers. Women and children predominated. Grave goods were abundant: favorite objects broken to kill them, the abundance and quality being indicative of the wealth and status of the deceased, as is usually the case. The clay figurines are especially revealing of life in the city. Of the greatest value archaeologically is the pottery, of which the shape and decoration typically fall into known types providing relatively certain chronological sequences and connections with other parts of Greece, Asia and Europe. The similarity of the ceramics to that of Corinth, east Greece, Thasos, Attica, and the Cyclades, along with the coins minted in Akanthos, are generally interpreted that the prosperity of Akanthos derived from its commercialism, which its strategic location supported.

== History ==
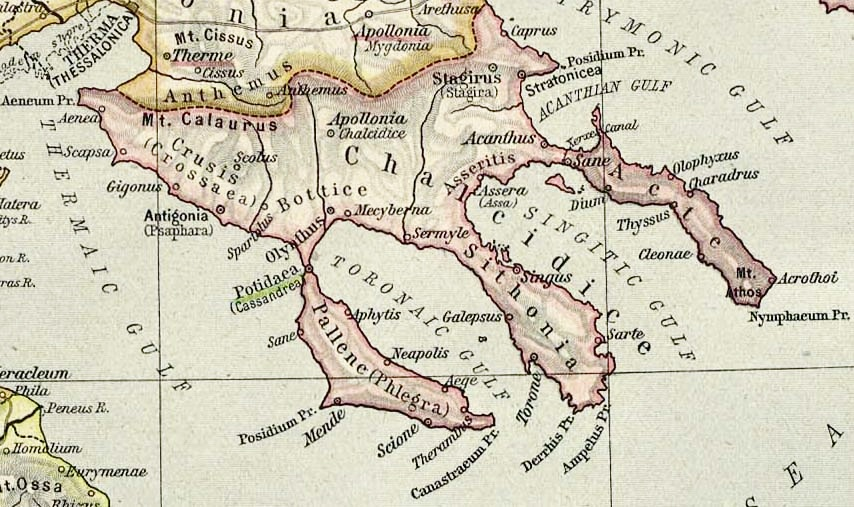
Chalcidice Peninsula

=== Foundation ===
It was founded by 7th century BC (the archaeology suggests 655 BC) by colonists from Andros, according to Thucydides. Plutarch, on the other hand, referred to it as a mixed colony of Andrians and local Chalcidians, which was founded on the "Coast of Drakontos", in place of a preexisting civilization. He writes that settlers from Andros and Chalcis arrived on the shore at the same time. The natives of Acanthus, seeing the crowd of settlers, became frightened and left the city. The settlers sent an explorer each to see what had happened and, as they approached the city and realized it was empty, ran to be the first to take over the land for their fellow countrymen. The Chalcidian was the fastest but the Andrian, seeing he was losing, stopped and threw his spear on the wall's gate, before his opponent arrived. A court case followed, which was won by the Andrians, because as they protested, they had just about taken over the city first.

=== Archaic period ===
Its growth during the Archaic period is reflected by the wide circulation of its currency, first minted around 530 BCE with the distinctive emblem of a lion killing a bull—perhaps linked to Herodotus’s account (vii. 125) that on the march of Xerxes from Acanthus to Therma, lions seized the camels which carried the provisions—at least 92 different types of coins have been found. Its economic resources emanated from the mining and wood from the nearby forests, but also through agricultural and vegetable goods that were transported through the sizable harbor.

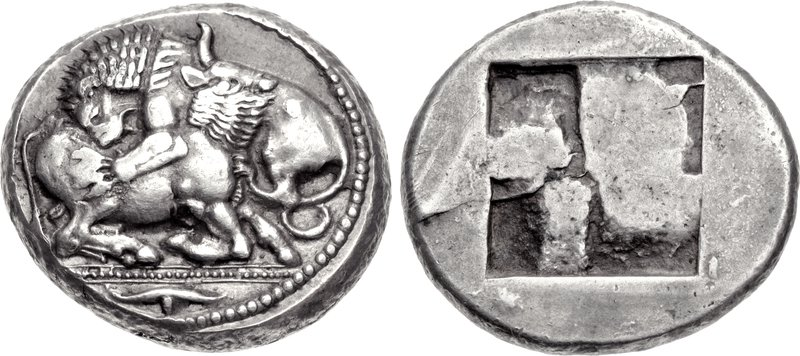
Coin of Akanthos with lion attacking a bull, Macedon. Circa 500–480 BCE

The first historical reference, in Thuycidides, from mid-5th century BC, connects the city with the Persian Wars, during which the townsfolk officially welcomed the Persians and willingly helped with the digging of the canal for Xerxes, 480 BC, for which Xerxes richly rewarded them. They declared one of his relatives who died in the area, named Artahei, a hero, and willingly took part in the expedition against Greece.

=== Classical period ===
After the Persian wars Acanthus became a member of the Athenian Alliance, paying tribute of three talents. In 424 BCE, after a short siege and oratory by Brasidas, the city was convinced to ally itself with the Spartans, although Thucydides remarks the greater likelihood that it was the threat to destroy their profitable vineyards, rather than Brasidas's rhetoric, that truly moved the Acanthians.

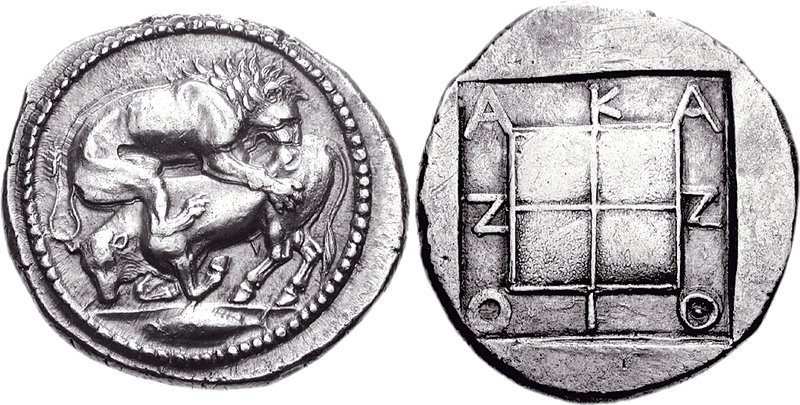
Coin of Akanthos, Macedon. Circa 470–430 BCE

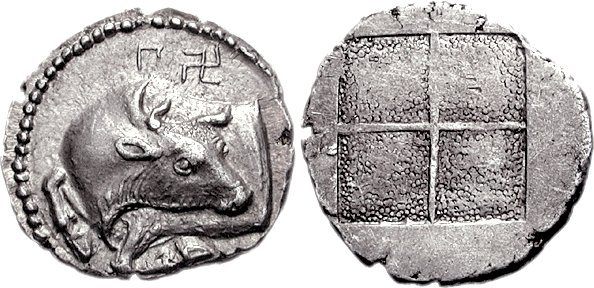
Coin of Akanthos, Macedon. Circa 470–390 BCE

In the initial phase of the establishment of the Chalcidice League, it was mainly smaller towns and cities in Macedonia that were enrolled. Only when it was firmly established was an offer made to Acanthus. When this was refuse a second offer was made but with the threat that force would be used should Acanthus refuse to join the federation. The townsfolk refused to join it, in part due to the old quarrel with the Chalcidians. Under threat from the Chalcidians, Acanthus called in Sparta's help, which came in 382 BC when the Spartans and Acanthians captured and destroyed Olynthos and the alliance, at least temporarily. Acanthus's staying-out of the alliance meant that in 350 BC, when it was conquered by Philip II of Macedon, it was not destroyed. Later it was incorporated to the region of Ouranoupolis, a new city that was founded by Alexarchos (Cassander's brother), in the isthmus, between the Strymoinan and the Singitic gulfs.

=== Hellenistic Period ===
According to Livy, Acanthus was attacked by a Roman-Pergamene fleet in 199 BC during the Second Macedonian War and then besieged, captured and sacked by Rome in 168 BC.

=== Roman period ===
The Romans later exploited all the natural sources of wealth and its harbor, and the town continued through the Roman and Byzantine period. In Roman times is attested epigraphically the existence of a Roman community attracted mainly by the rich mines of this region Around the start of the 1st century, Acanthus's renaming began, with its name translated into the Latin Ericius, from which was derived its Byzantine and modern name of Ierissos or Erissos.

== See also ==
- Akanthos curse tablet
- List of ancient Greek cities

== Sources ==
- Kolovos, Elias; Kotzageorgis, Phokion (2015). "Halkidiki in the Early Modern Period: Towards an Environmental History". In Gounaris, Basil C. (ed.). Mines, Olives and Monasteries: Aspects of Halkidiki's Environmental History (PDF). Thessaloniki: Epikentro.
- Kyranoudis, Kosmas-Panagiotis (2015). "Linguistic Evidence on the Natural Environment of Halkidiki: Oiconyms and Toponyms". In Gounaris, Basil C. (ed.). Mines, Olives and Monasteries: Aspects of Halkidiki's Environmental History (PDF). Thessaloniki: Epikentro.
- Smyrlis, Kostis (2015). "Settlement and Environment in Halkidiki, Ninth to Fifteenth Century AD". In Gounaris, Basil C. (ed.). Mines, Olives and Monasteries: Aspects of Halkidiki's Environmental History (PDF). Thessaloniki: Epikentro.
- Trakosopoulou-Salakidou, Eleni; Paspalas, Stavros A. (2006–2007). "ASPECTS OF THE EXCAVATIONS AT ACANTHUS: THE EARLY IRON AGE AND THE EARLY ARCHAIC PERIOD". Mediterranean Archaeology. 19–20: 45–54.
- Tsigarida, Elisavet; Xydopoulos, Ioannis (2015). "Halkidiki Landscape, Archaeology, and Ethnicity". In Gounaris, Basil C. (ed.). Mines, Olives and Monasteries: Aspects of Halkidiki's Environmental History (PDF). Thessaloniki: Epikentro.
