= Archaeological Museum of Polygyros =

Museum in Polygyros, Greece

Coordinates: 40°22′37″N 23°26′23.2″E

- Αρχαιολογικό Μουσείο Πολυγύρου
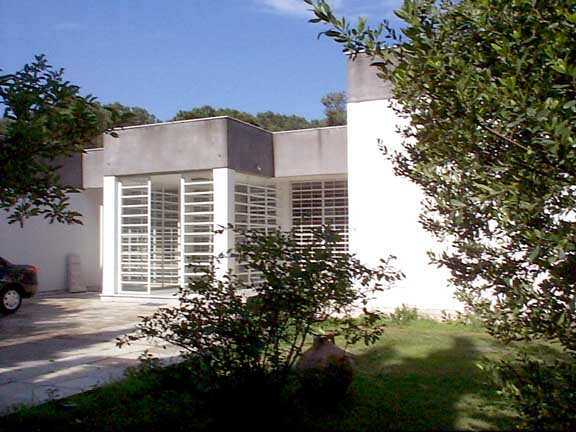
- Outside view
- Established: 1971
- Location: Polygyros, Greece
- Type: archaeological museum

The Archaeological Museum of Polygyros is a museum in Polygyros, Chalkidiki, in Greece. The museum is located in Iroou Square in the town centre and displays representative archaeological finds from all over Chalkidiki. More specifically, they cover a span of time ranging from the Bronze Age to the Roman period and come from ancient Stageira (near Olympiada), Toroni, Pyrgadikia, Aphytos, Polygyros, Ierissos, Stratoni, as also from the ancient city of Olynthos.

== History ==
The Archeological Museum of Polygyros began construction in 1965 and was completed in 1971, housed in a building designed by the renowned architect Dimitris Fatouros. The museum's collections grew considerably over the following decades, and in 2016 it was relocated to its current building. An additional new permanent exhibition was inaugurated in 2022.

== Exhibits ==
The most important exhibits are an unfinished kouros of the Archaic period, weapons and jewellery of the Late Archaic and Classical periods, a marble head of Dionysos from ancient Aphytos (4th century BC), a black-figure column crater from Vrastama (late 6th century BC), and two marble grave statues from the heroön at Stratonicea (1st century BC). Particularly important are the finds from the city and the cemetery of Olynthos, of the Archaic and Classical period, because they give a full picture of the everyday activities and the public life of that time.

The museum has hosted an exhibition entitled "Three Colonies of Andros in Chalcidice: Sane, Akanthos, Stageira" since 1998. Among other things, it includes three standing or kneeling statues of Nike from the roof of a 6th-century BC temple, originally at Sane and later incorporated into the urban complex of Ouranoupolis. Thanks to the exhibition, the Polygyros Museum won the 16th Directorate of Prehistoric and Classical Antiquities' Museum of the Year Award in 1998.

The newest permanent exhibition of the Archaeological Museum of Polygyros was added in July 2022.

== Gallery ==
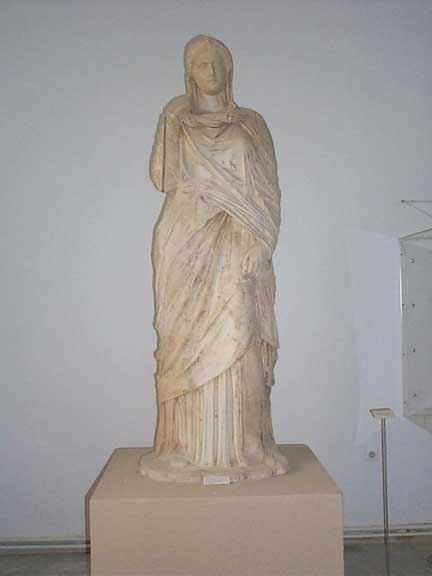
A Statue of the Herron at Stratoni

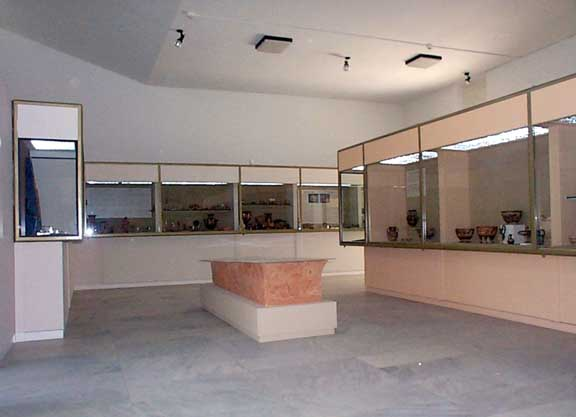
Interior view

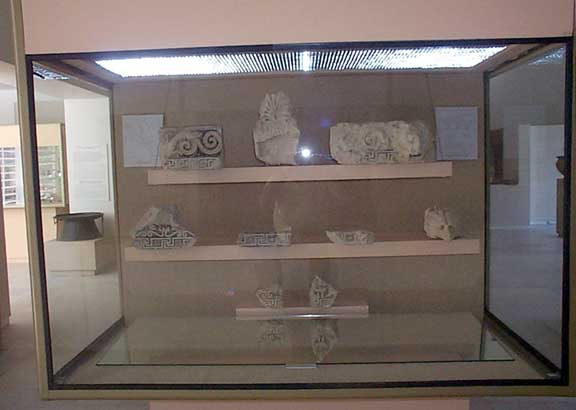
Clay Members of the Sanctuary of Ammon Zeus at Afytos

== Attribution ==
- This article incorporates text from the corresponding article at the Museums of Macedonia website, commissioned by the Macedonian Heritage foundation, written by Vlasis Vlasidis, and published under a CC-BY-SA-3.0 license.
