= Zygos Monastery =

Coordinates: 40°18′58″N 24°00′10″E

Zygou Monastery
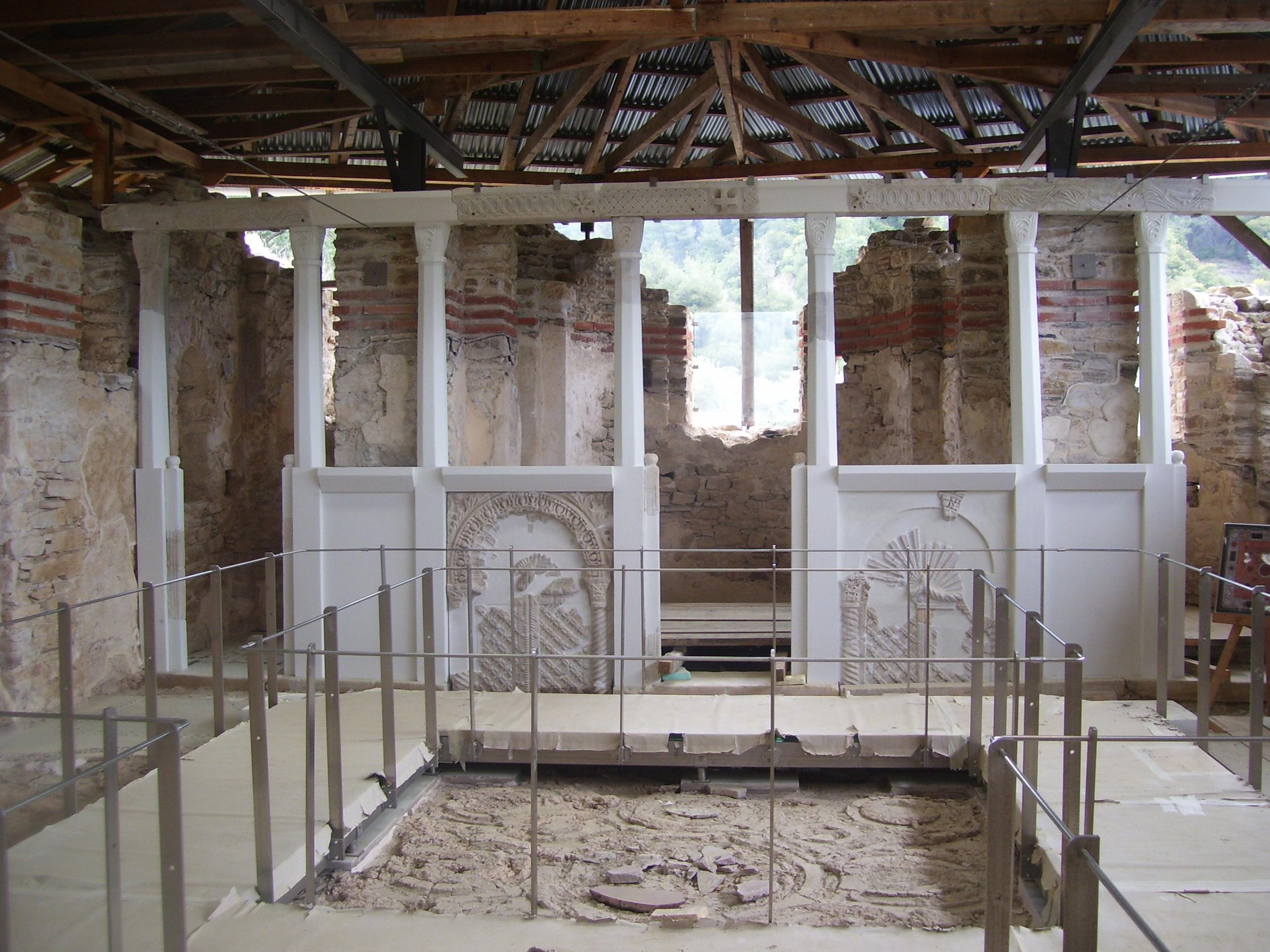
- The church
- Interactive map of Zygou Monastery

Monastery information
- Other name: Frangokastro
- Established: before 991 (first mentioned in 942)
- Disestablished: 1199 (abandoned)
- Dedication: Prophet Elijah
- Diocese: Metropolis of Ierissos, Mount Athos and Ardameri

Site
- Location: near Ouranoupoli, Chalkidiki, Greece
- Visible remains: Ruins
- Public access: Yes

Zygou Monastery (Μονή Ζυγού) is a ruined medieval monastery on the Chalkidiki peninsula, Greece, in the territory of the Aristotelis municipality, Central Macedonia region.

== Geography ==
The ruins of the monastery are located in the area of Frangokastro, 2 km (1.2 mi) southeast of Ouranoupoli, 40 m (130 ft) from the border of the monastic republic of Mount Athos.

== History ==
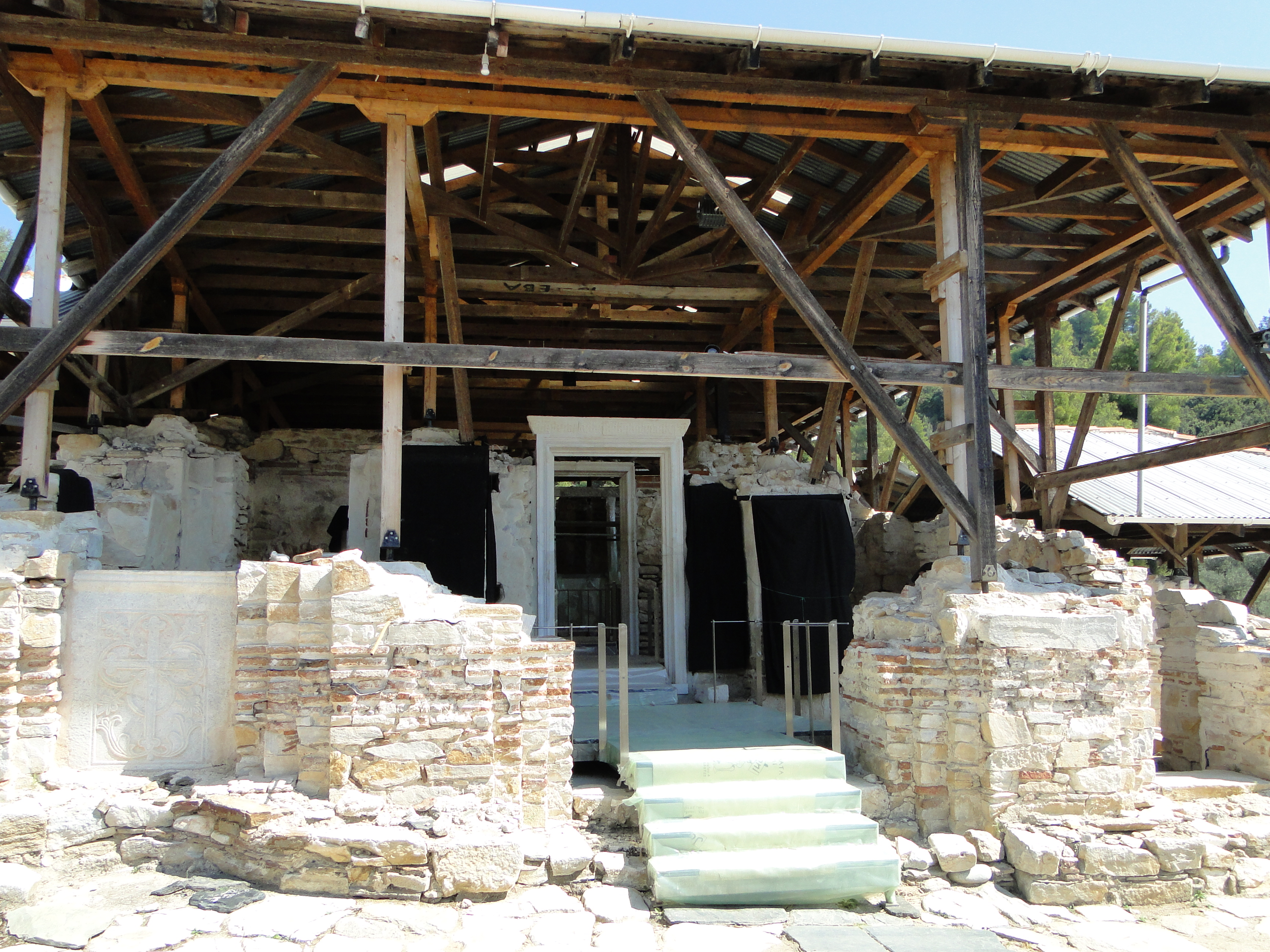
The katholikon

The monastery complex contains remains of buildings from the 4th to 6th centuries BC. The monastery is first mentioned in 942 in connection with a dispute between Ierissos and monks over property boundaries. In 958 Athanasius the Athonite, who in the mid-10th century founded the Great Lavra, arrived in the area. The monastery was founded before 991, and its connection with Athanasius is confirmed by his lead seal, found there recently during excavations. The first certain mention of the monastery comes a little later, in 996, in a document of the Great Lavra, which bears the signature of "Nikon, monk and abbot of Zygou". The monastery was dedicated to the Prophet Elijah, had metochia in Ierissos, Gomati and Provlakas, and was one of the most important monasteries of Athos in the 11th century. In 1199 the monastery was abandoned for some reason and was granted by Emperor Alexios III Angelos as a metochion to the recently restored Hilandar monastery. The reason for its decline may have been pillaging by pirates in the 12th century. After the fall of Constantinople in 1204, in 1206 a Frankish knight arrived at Zygou with a small army, repaired the fortifications and began using the monastery as a base for predatory raids on the Athonite monasteries. The Athonite monks asked Pope Innocent III for help, and through his personal intervention the knight was expelled from the monastery in 1211. Part of the castle's buildings were destroyed by fire, probably during the expulsion of the Frankish knight. From this period the name Frangokastro, that is Frankish Castle, remains.

From 1211 until the 15th century the area remained part of the Hilandar Monastery. In 1585 part of the walls was destroyed by an earthquake. In the 16th and 17th centuries an olive press operated on the site, and later lime kilns were built, in which, unfortunately, many marble architectural elements of the monastery were destroyed. In 1858 the Russian archimandrite Porphyrius Uspensky visited the site and left a complete description of it. In 1945 and 1978 the southeastern tower and a large part of the walls were destroyed by a major flood.

== Description ==
The special interest of the building complex lies in the fact that, on the one hand, it is the only monastery of Mount Athos that can be visited by women, even though it is in ruins. On the other hand, it is the only one that can be studied in its original 10th–12th-century form, since there are no later repairs or additions to the buildings.

The fortified enclosure forms a pentagon with two gates, one in the northern and one in the southern wall. The wall is reinforced with eleven towers, the most important of which is the northwestern one, measuring 8.60 m × 8.14 m (28.2 ft × 26.7 ft), with a surviving height of 4 m (13 ft) and an original height of more than 15 m (49 ft) – a structure from around 1000, as is most of the fortification.

The southeastern part of the walls with the small tower is attributed to the additions made by the Frankish knight between 1206 and 1211. At the same time the fortifications were reinforced in height and additional sanitary facilities were built.

The construction of the catholicon dates from 1000, with three further building phases following. Initially the complex cross-shaped church with the narthex was built (measuring 14.60 m × 9.70 m (47.9 ft × 31.8 ft)). In the second building phase, evidently immediately after the death of the monastery's founder, the northern chapel with the founder's tomb was added. The building of the third phase is the exonarthex, and of the fourth the southern chapel with another founder's tomb. After that, three more tombs were added on the southern wall adjoining the catholicon.

The walls of the church are preserved to a height of 1.5–4 m (4 ft 11 in – 13 ft 1 in). Many of the marble architectural elements, including the columns that supported the dome, are missing, but the marble screen of the northern opening of the church, as well as other reliefs, are preserved in good condition.

The monastery church has been restored. Part of the old frescoes, columns and mosaics from the early 11th century are preserved in it.

The ruins of the refectory (trapeza; measuring 14.80 m × 6.20 m (48.6 ft × 20.3 ft)) are located to the west of the catholicon. The walls were painted red; there were double windows, a wooden roof covered with tiles, and large marble tables. A cistern was also identified in the basement of the tower, a possible site for a laundry, two ovens and a large cellar. This clearly indicates the monastery's large-scale wine production. In the narthex of the catholicon, by then ruined, an olive press was built in the 16th–17th centuries, as evidenced by the marble oil press and two large millstones.

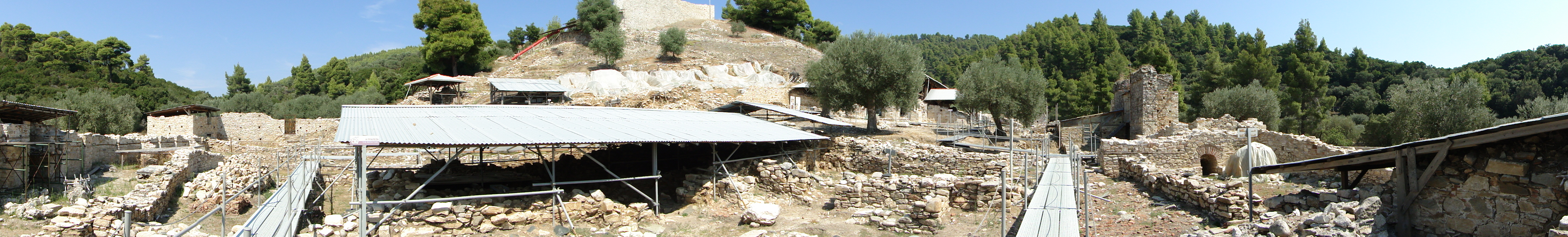
The Monastery of Zygou
