= Siderokausia =

Ancient ore mine and coin mint in Greece

Coordinates: 40°31′N 23°47′E

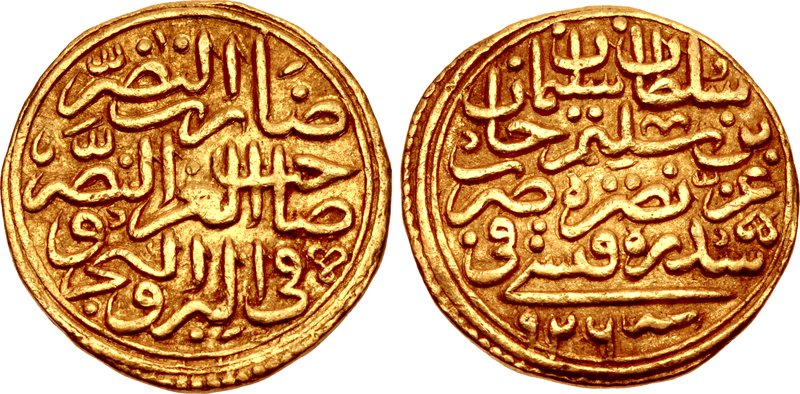
Gold sultani minted at Siderokausia, AH 926 (1519/20 CE)

Siderokausia (Greek: Σιδηροκαύσια; Ottoman Turkish: ﺳﻴﺪر َﻩ ﻗﺴﯽ, romanized: Sidrekapsi), was a silver and gold mine active in the Byzantine and Ottoman periods, located in the northeastern Chalkidiki peninsula in northern Greece. The settlements of the region are known to this day as Mademochoria (Μαντεμοχώρια, "mine villages"). In the Ottoman period, a coin mint was attached to the mine.

== History ==
The area, which first appears under the name Siderokausia in the 9th century, is located in northeastern Chalkidiki, around Stratoniki. Following the Ottoman conquest of the region in the early 15th century, the area flourished once more. At its height, some 500 to 600 kilns were active for the processing of lead and zinc. By 1705, the Ottoman sultans had granted the twelve mining villages, or Mademochoria (Μαντεμοχώρια < Turkish maaden, "mine" + Greek χωριό, "village"), extensive autonomy and privileges, in exchange for the payment of one twelfth of the annual silver production. According to the English traveller William Martin Leake, the supervision of the mines, along with the government of the twelve villages (which he calls ελευθεροχώρια, "free villages"), was under an Ottoman official, the madem aghasi. The twelve villages were Anthemounta (modern Galatista), Vavdos, Riana, Stanos, Varvara, Liaringova (modern Arnaia), Novoselo (modern Neochori), Machalas (Stageira), Isvoro (modern Stratoniki), Chorouda, Revenikia (modern Megali Panagia), and Ierissos.

The mine (Ottoman Turkish ma‘den-i Sidrekapsi) was very large: "...by far the most productive of the Balkan mines during the first half of the sixteenth century...employing as many as 6,000 miners... Its total output has been estimated at about six tons per year...". The attached mint was active from about 1530 to the 18th or perhaps the 19th century, and produced silver akçe and gold sultani. For the sultani, it was one of the three main mints of the Empire, along with Cairo and Istanbul.

The Mademochoria retained their privileged status until their participation in the Greek War of Independence in 1821. The abortive uprising led to the cantonment of no less than 10,000 troops in the region, to guard the mines, with the villages being charged with their upkeep. As a result, the mines entered a period of crisis that led to their takeover by a Franco-Ottoman consortium, the Kassandra Mines company, based in Paris. In 1893, the company received exploitation rights for the antimony, lead, and manganese mines. A multi-national workforce of some 6,000 workers was employed in the ca. 600 kilns.

In 1920, the mines were bought by the Anonymous Greek Chemical Products and Fertilizer Company (Ανώνυμη Ελληνική Εταιρεία Χημικών Προϊόντων & Λιπασμάτων, ΑΕΕΧΠ & Λιπασμάτων), partly in order to secure their supply of sulfides for their fertilizer factories. At that time, the main loading site was located at the site of the modern village of Stratoni, where the minerals were brought via a six-kilometer-long Decauville-type railway line. In 1932, this system was replaced by an aerial transport line. Following the Asia Minor Catastrophe, Asia Minor refugees from the mining village of Balya Karaydın were settled in temporary shelters at Stratoni. Following the 1932 Ierissos earthquake, the settlement was rebuilt, and the modern village emerged.

== Sources ==
- O. Davies, "Ancient Mines in Southern Macedonia", The Journal of the Royal Anthropological Institute of Great Britain and Ireland 62 (Jan.-Jun., 1932), p. 140 doi:10.2307/2843882
- Speros Vryonis, Jr., "The Question of the Byzantine Mines", Speculum 37:1:13-14 (Jan., 1962) doi:10.2307/2850595
