= Olympiada, Chalkidiki =

Town in Chalkidiki, Greece

Olympiada Ολυμπιάδα
- Community
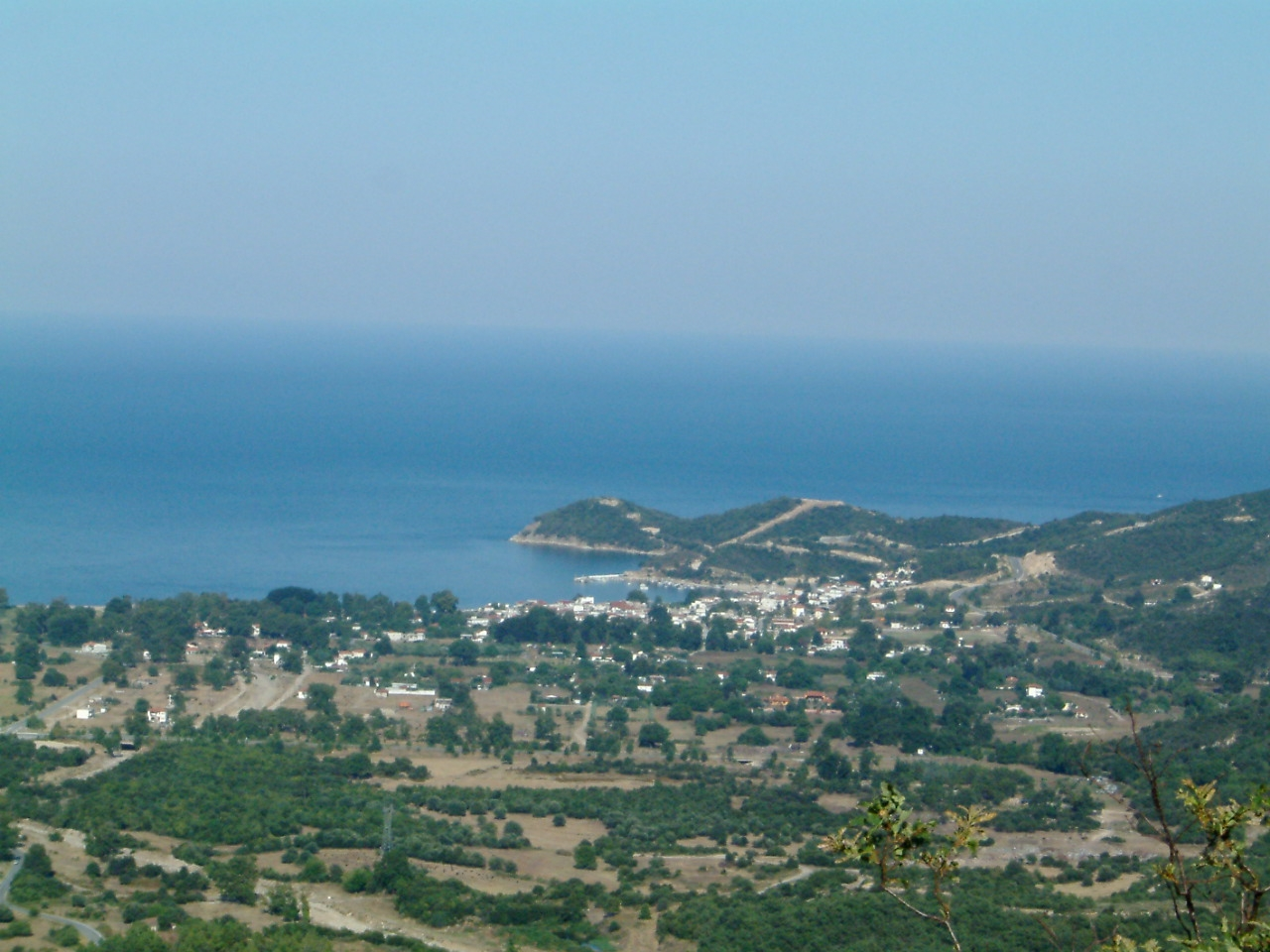
- View of Olympiada from northwest

- Location within Greece
- Coordinates: 40°35′32″N 23°46′44″E
- Country: Greece
- Administrative region: Central Macedonia
- Regional unit: Chalkidiki
- Municipality: Aristotelis
- Municipal unit: Stagira-Akanthos
- Village established: 1923 (103 years ago)

Population (2021)
  - Community: 638
- Time zone: UTC+2 (EET)
  - Summer (DST): UTC+3 (EEST)

Olympiada (Greek: Ολυμπιάδα) is a town in the northeastern part of the Chalkidiki peninsula in Central Macedonia, Greece. It had 638 inhabitants in the 2021 census. Olympiada is a community within the municipal unit of Stagira-Akanthos, in the Aristotelis municipality. The main occupations of its residents are tourism and fishing. The town is located 35 km from Ierissos and 90 km from Thessaloniki. Approximately 700 meters from the town lies the archaeological site of ancient Stagira. The area is declared a protected zone under the Natura 2000 programme.

== Name ==
The town is named after Olympias, a princess of Ancient Epirus and the mother of Alexander the Great.

== History ==
Olympiada was founded in 1923 by Greek refugees from Asia Minor. The land was originally marshy, and malaria was a major health problem. Many of the early settlers died, while others migrated to other parts of Macedonia or Thrace.

Over time, the village developed with fishing, agriculture, and later tourism becoming important sources of income.

== Geography ==
Olympiada lies on the northeastern coast of Chalkidiki, with views of the Aegean Sea and surrounding hills. The proximity to ancient Stagira makes it a site of historical interest as well.

== Economy and Tourism ==
Tourism is the main economic activity, particularly in summer, with visitors drawn to the beaches and local taverns. Fishing and small-scale agriculture remain significant for the local community.
