= Varvara, Chalkidiki =

Varvara Βαρβάρα
- Community
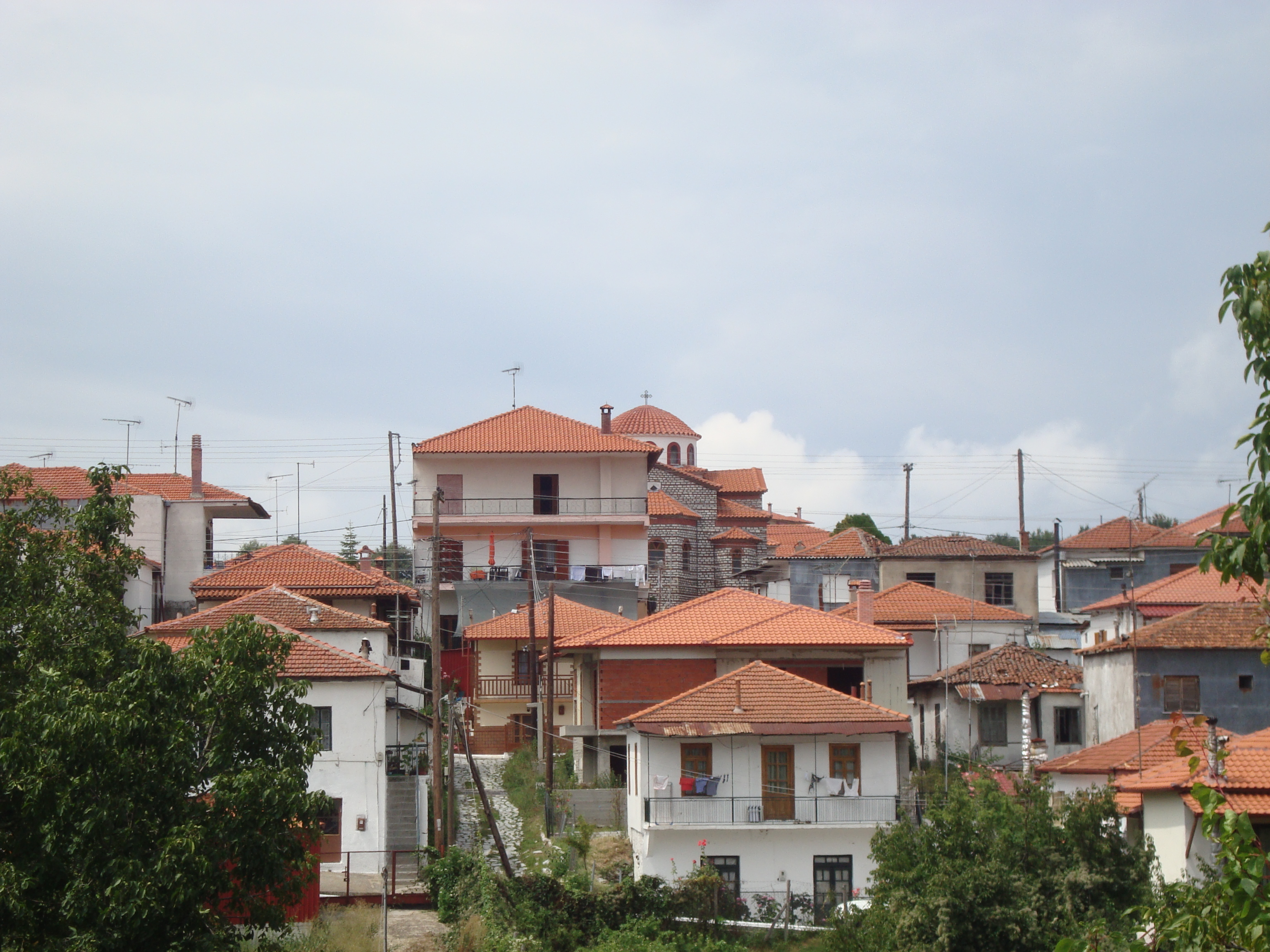
- Varvara

- Location within Greece
- Coordinates: 40°31′N 23°42′E
- Country: Greece
- Administrative region: Central Macedonia
- Regional unit: Chalkidiki
- Municipality: Aristotelis
- Municipal unit: Arnaia

Population (2021)
  - Community: 539
- Time zone: UTC+2 (EET)
  - Summer (DST): UTC+3 (EEST)

Varvara is a village in Chalkidiki, in Greece. It is located in the north of Chalkidiki, built at 550 m height, between the hills Derveniko and Sougkliani. It is part of Aristotelis municipality. Its population is 539 residents according to 2021 census. It is 20 kilometers northwest of Arnaia. In the east of the village there are the Aegean coasts and the ancient city Stagira, the birthplace of Aristotle.

== History ==
The site has been inhabited at least since the 14th century from Albanians. The village's name derives from the local church of Saint Barbara (Agia Varvara). In the Ottoman period the village belonged to the Mademochoria. During the Greek War of Independence it was burned down by the Turks along with other villages of Chalkidiki. During the Macedonian Struggle, it was the base of the Greek guerrilla leader Athanasios Minopoulos.

== The forest of Varvara ==
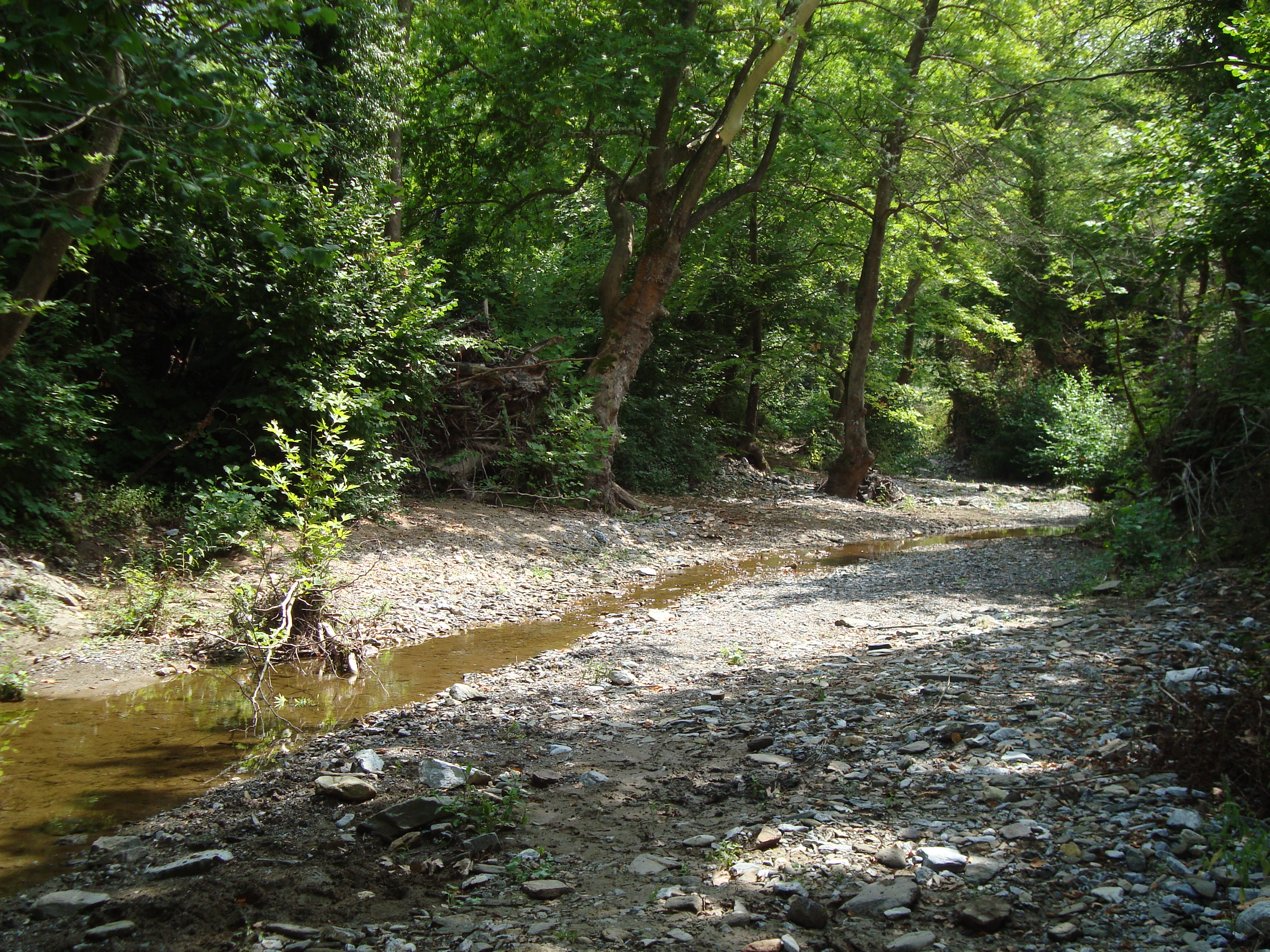
Varvara's forest

Varvara is situated in the middle of a big forest. The forest is covered by thick vegetation. It includes many genres of trees, among them beeches, oaks, alders, wild hazels and lindens. Main occupation of the residents is the lumber. The visitors in vicinity comes across frequently many trunks of trees at the sides of the roads. Inside the forest there are two waterfalls that are a sight of the place.

== Varvara's music festival ==
The music festival of Varvara is organised every summer, in the forest near the village. It's about music concerts from Greek bands mainly and singers. The program lasts four days. This year (2013) it organised for 15th time.
