= Stratoni =

Stratoni Στρατώνι
- Community
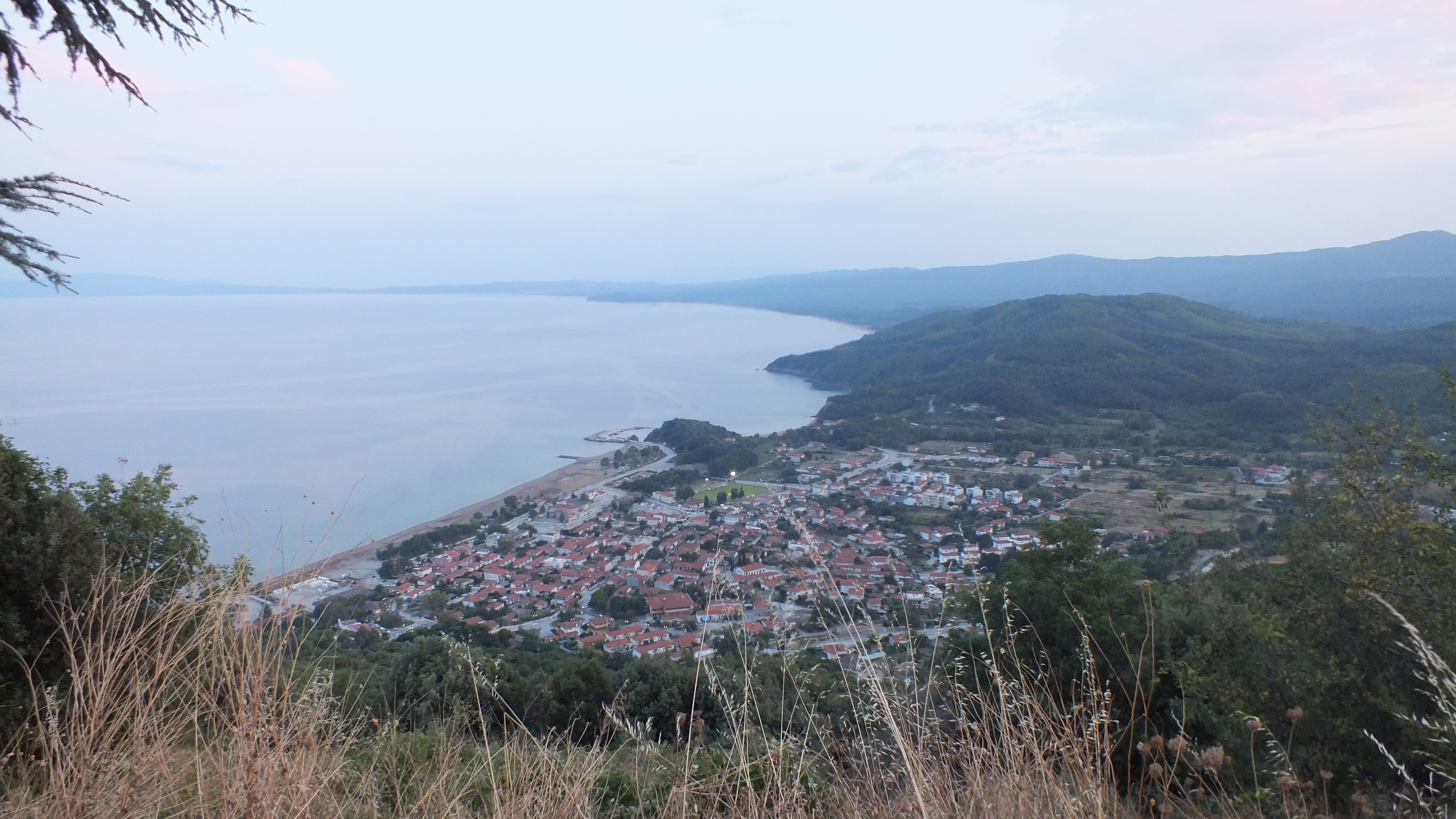
- View of Stratoni

- Location within Greece
- Coordinates: 40°31′N 23°49′E
- Country: Greece
- Administrative region: Central Macedonia
- Regional unit: Chalkidiki
- Municipality: Aristotelis
- Municipal unit: Stagira-Akanthos

Population (2021)
  - Community: 992
- Time zone: UTC+2 (EET)
  - Summer (DST): UTC+3 (EEST)

Stratoni (Greek: Στρατώνι) is a community of 992 inhabitants (2021 census), situated on the north-eastern coast of the Chalkidiki peninsula, in Northern Greece. It is part of Aristotelis municipality and the municipal unit Stagira-Akanthos.

== History ==
The main feature of this area is the rich mines, whose activity dates from 600 B.C. In antiquity the city of Stratonicea was located there. Modern Stratoni was built in the 19th century and its first residents were the miners of the local mines. After the Asia Minor Disaster the population increased due to the arrival of refugees from Asia Minor. In 1932 the village suffered great damages from the earthquake in nearby Ierissos. Nowadays the mining activity continues to be the main occupation of the residents.

== Historical population ==
Historical population
Year	Pop.	±%
1991	1,421	—
2001	1,153	−18.9%
2011	1,057	−8.3%
2021	992	−6.1%
