= Strymonian Gulf =

- Στρυμονικός Κόλπος (Greek)
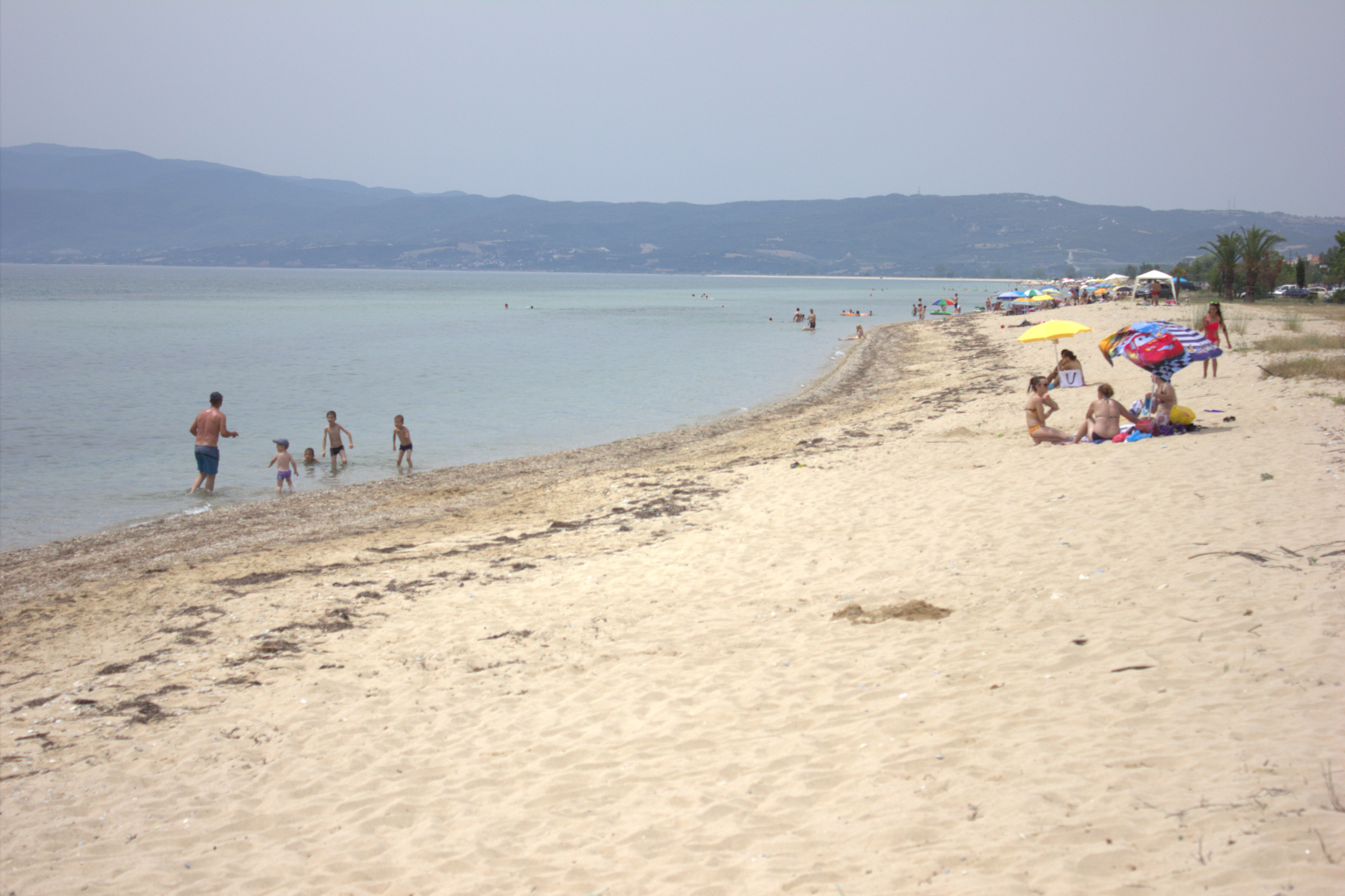
- View of Strymonian Gulf from Paralia Orfiniou

- Location of the Strymonian Gulf within Greece
- Location: Central Macedonia
- Coordinates: 40°40′N 23°50′E
- Type: Gulf
- Part of: Aegean Sea
- River sources: Strymon
- Basin countries: Greece, Bulgaria

The Strymonian or Strymonic Gulf (Greek: Στρυμονικός Κόλπος, romanized: Strymonikos Kolpos), also known as the Orfano Gulf (Greek: Κόλπος Ορφανού, romanized: Kolpos Orfanou), is a branch of the Thracian Sea—itself part of the Aegean Sea—lying east of the Chalcidice peninsula and south of the Serres regional unit. It was formerly known as the Gulf of Rendina, in reference to the ancient colony of Eion along the gulf's shores.

The river Struma/Strymon empties into the gulf.

The largest towns on the Strymonic Gulf, with their respective administrative divisions, are:

- Asprovalta, Stavros, Nea Vrasna (Thessaloniki regional unit, Central Macedonia);
- Orfani (Kavala regional unit, East Macedonia and Thrace);
- Olympiada, Stratoni (Chalkidiki regional unit, Central Macedonia);
- Nea Kerdylia, Amfipoli (Serres regional unit, Central Macedonia).

Three mountains form the natural border of the Gulf: Pangaio to the north-east, Kerdylio to the north, and Stratoni to the south.
