= Stageira Chalkidikis =

Stageira Στάγειρα
- Community
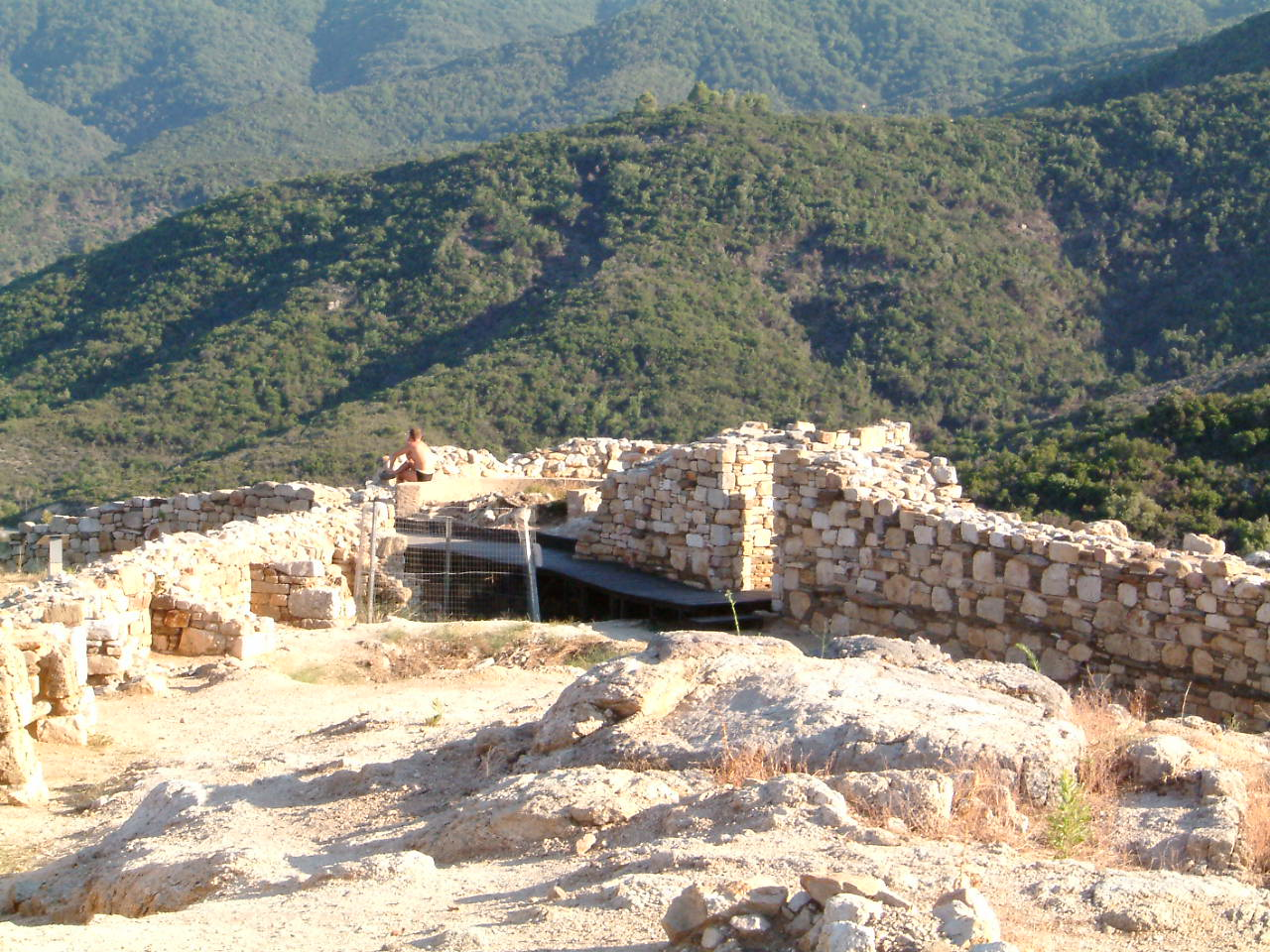
- Archaeological site near the village of Stagira

- Location within Greece
- Coordinates: 40°31′49″N 23°45′09″E
- Country: Greece
- Administrative region: Central Macedonia
- Regional unit: Chalkidiki
- Municipality: Aristotelis
- Municipal unit: Stagira-Akanthos

Population (2021)
  - Community: 373
- Time zone: UTC+2 (EET)
  - Summer (DST): UTC+3 (EEST)
- Vehicle registration: ΧΚ

Stagira (Greek: Στάγειρα, also: Στάγιρα - Stagira) is a Greek village lying on a plateau on the Chalcidice peninsula, at the foot of the Argirolofos hill. The village stands approximately 18 kilometers southwest of the ruins of ancient Stageira, the birthplace of Aristotle.

A modern statue of Aristotle and small theme park is located next to the modern town. It is part of the municipal unit Stagira-Akanthos within the municipality Aristotelis.

== History ==
The village of Stagira was built 18 km from the archaeological site of Stagira. In Byzantine times, Stagira was called Siderokafsia (which means blast furnace). The sultan's mint was located there in the 16th century and many ruins of furnaces can be found close to the village. The historical central church of Stagira was built in 1814, a few years before the Greek War of Independence.

== Population ==
The present-day village has approximately 400 inhabitants but including the neighboring village of Stratoniki, with which Stagira virtually merges, the population increases to around 1500.
