= Christian Chalkidiki Exhibition =

Museum in Ouranoupoli, Greece

Coordinates: 40°20′N 23°59′E

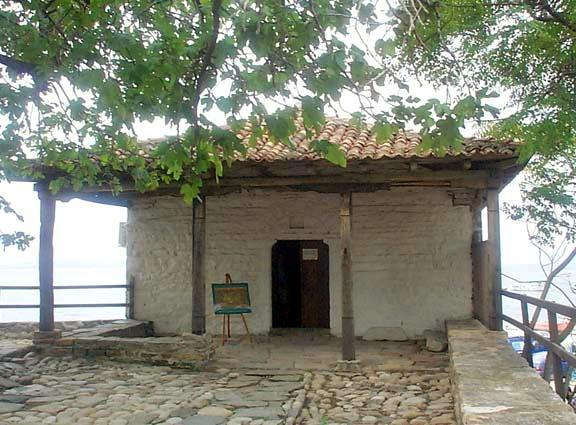
Outside View

The Christian Chalkidiki Exhibition is located in the town of Ouranoupoli, Chalkidiki, in Central Macedonia, Greece. It was set up by the 10th Ephorate of Byzantine Antiquities of the Greek Archaeological Service. Ouranoupoli is the village where visitors and pilgrims embark for Mount Athos. The exhibition is housed in a building near the embarkation point and the Tower of Prosforion. Constructed in the eighteenth century, this building was the boat-house (arsanas) of the monks of Vatopedi Monastery.

The exhibits date to the Early Christian, Byzantine, and post-Byzantine periods and come from all over Chalkidiki. Several icons of the eighteenth to early twentieth century from monasteries, churches and chapels in Chalkidiki are on display. Also noteworthy are the wall paintings from the sanctuary and prothesis apses of a chapel of the Monastery of Saint Anastasia, and several other examples of religious art. On the second floor are Christian finds from excavations in Chalkidiki, including pottery, coins, jewellery, and arrowheads from various places all over Chalkidiki.

== Gallery ==
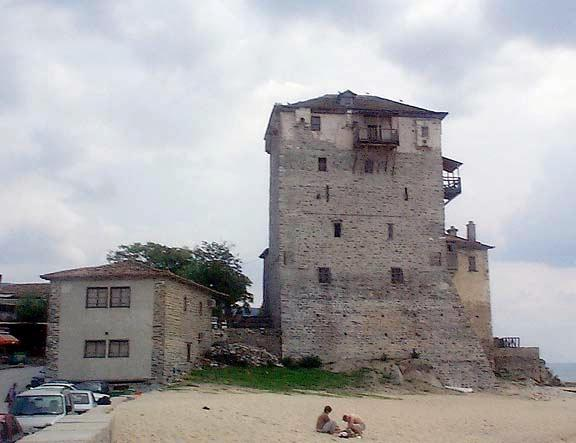
The Old Tower and the arsanas

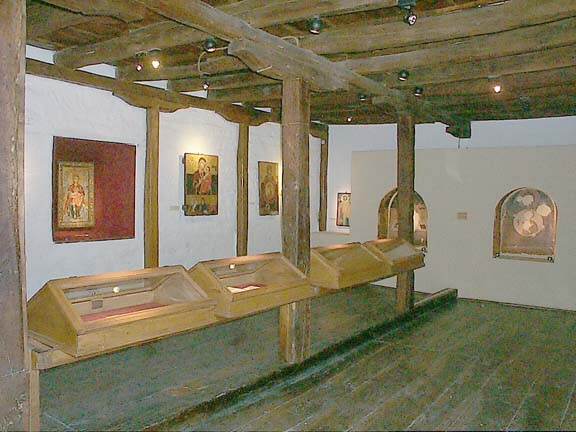
Exhibits at the first floor

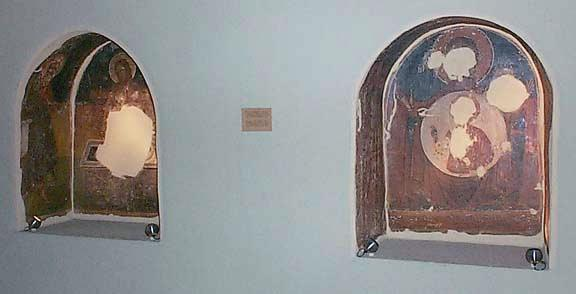
Wall paintings detached from the sanctuary and prothesis apses of the Chapel of the Holy Trinity, a dependency of the Monastery of St Anastasia (16th‚Äì17th cent.)

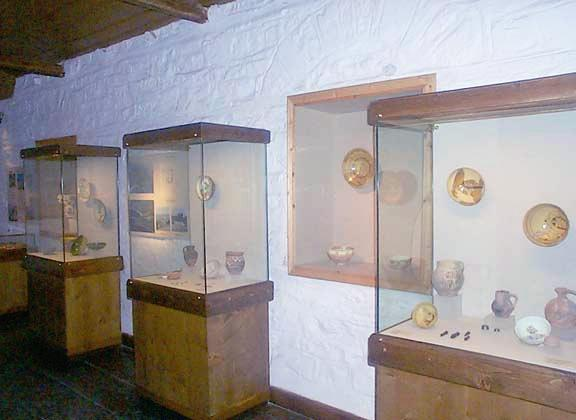
Exhibits from new excavations at Chalkidiki

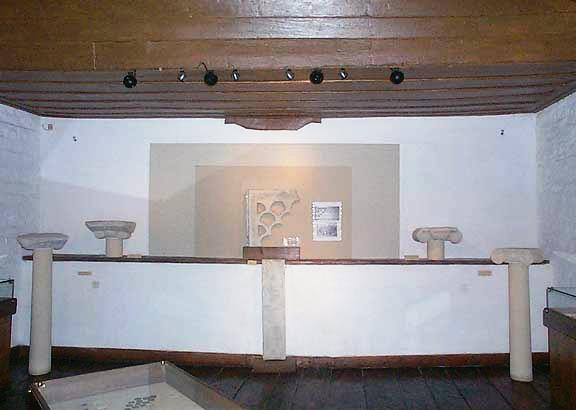
Parts from the Early Christian basilicas of Sophronios and St George at Nikiti

== Attribution ==
- This article incorporates text from the corresponding article at the Museums of Macedonia website, commissioned by the Macedonian Heritage foundation, written by Vlasis Vlasidis, and published under a CC-BY-SA-3.0 license.
