= Stagira-Akanthos =

Stagira-Akanthos Στάγιρα-Άκανθος
- Municipal unit
- Location within the regional unit

- Location within Greece
- Coordinates: 40°24′N 23°53′E
- Country: Greece
- Administrative region: Central Macedonia
- Regional unit: Chalkidiki
- Municipality: Aristotelis

Area
  - Municipal unit: 253.4 km^{2} (97.8 sq mi)

Population (2021)
  - Municipal unit: 8,274
  - Municipal unit density: 32.65/km^{2} (84.57/sq mi)
- Time zone: UTC+2 (EET)
  - Summer (DST): UTC+3 (EEST)
- Vehicle registration: ΧΚ

Stagira-Akanthos (Greek: Στάγιρα-Άκανθος) is a former municipality in Chalkidiki, Greece. Since the 2011 local government reform it is part of the municipality Aristotelis, of which it is a municipal unit. Population 8,274 (2021). The seat of the former municipality was in Ierissos, which is also the seat of the municipality Aristotelis. The land area of the municipal unit is 253.373 km^{2}. It lies north of the autonomous area of Mount Athos. The Greek philosopher Aristotle was born in the ancient city of Stageira, in the northwest part of the municipal unit.

== Subdivisions ==
The municipal unit Stagira-Akanthos is subdivided into the following communities:

- Ammouliani
- Ierissos
- Nea Roda
- Olympiada
- Ouranoupoli
- Stagira
- Stratoniki
- Stratoni

== See also ==
- Strymonian Gulf
