= Sultani (coin) =

Ottoman gold coin

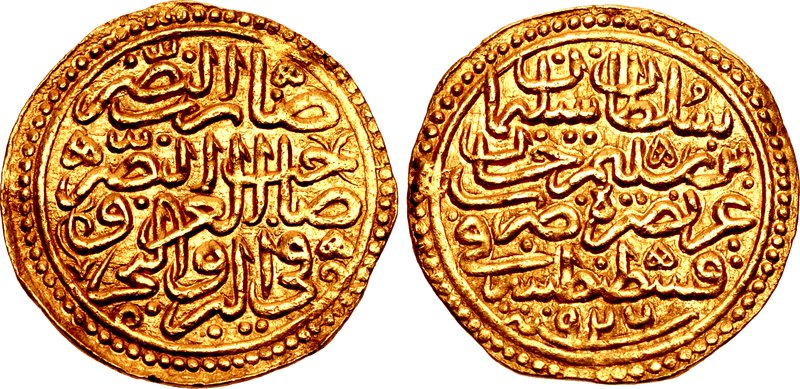
Sultani of Sulayman I, 1520–21

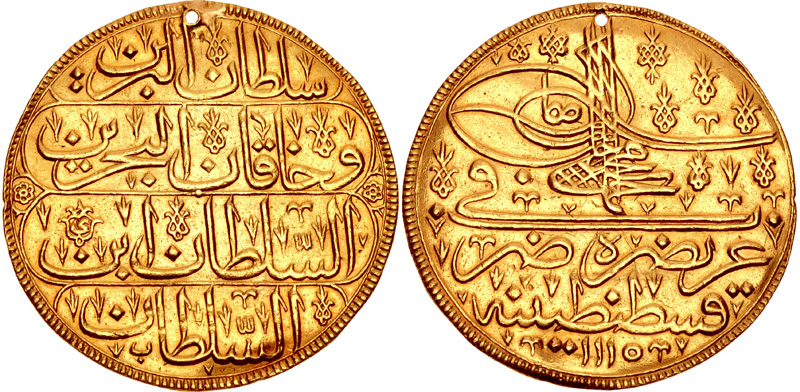
Sultani of Ahmed III, 1703

The sultani (Ottoman Turkish: سلطاني) was an Ottoman gold coin. It was first minted in 1477–78 during the reign of Mehmed II (r. 1451–1481), following the Venetian ducat standard, weighing about 3.45 grams (0.111 ozt). The sultani is the classic Ottoman gold coin also known generically as altın (آلتون, "gold").

Although different currency systems were used for different parts of the Ottoman Empire, for symbolic and economic reasons, the sultani was the empire's only gold coin during the sixteenth century.
