= Stratonicea (Chalcidice) =

Ancient town in Chalcidice, Greece

Stratonicea or Stratonikeia (Ancient Greek: Στρατονίκεια), also Stratoniki (Στρατονίκη), was a town of Chalcidice in ancient Macedonia. It was a Hellenistic foundation, according to Claudius Ptolemy, the city was located on the Singitic Gulf. However, recent excavations show the location of ancient Stratoniki to be at the site of the modern town of Stratoni. This shouldn't be confused with the modern town of Stratoniki which is located 9 km to the west, next to the modern town of Stagira.

== Sources ==
- Hazlitt's Classical Gazetteer
- Blue Guide, Greece (ISBN 0-393-30372-1), p. 599
