= Ouranoupoli =

Ouranoupoli Ουρανούπολη
- Community
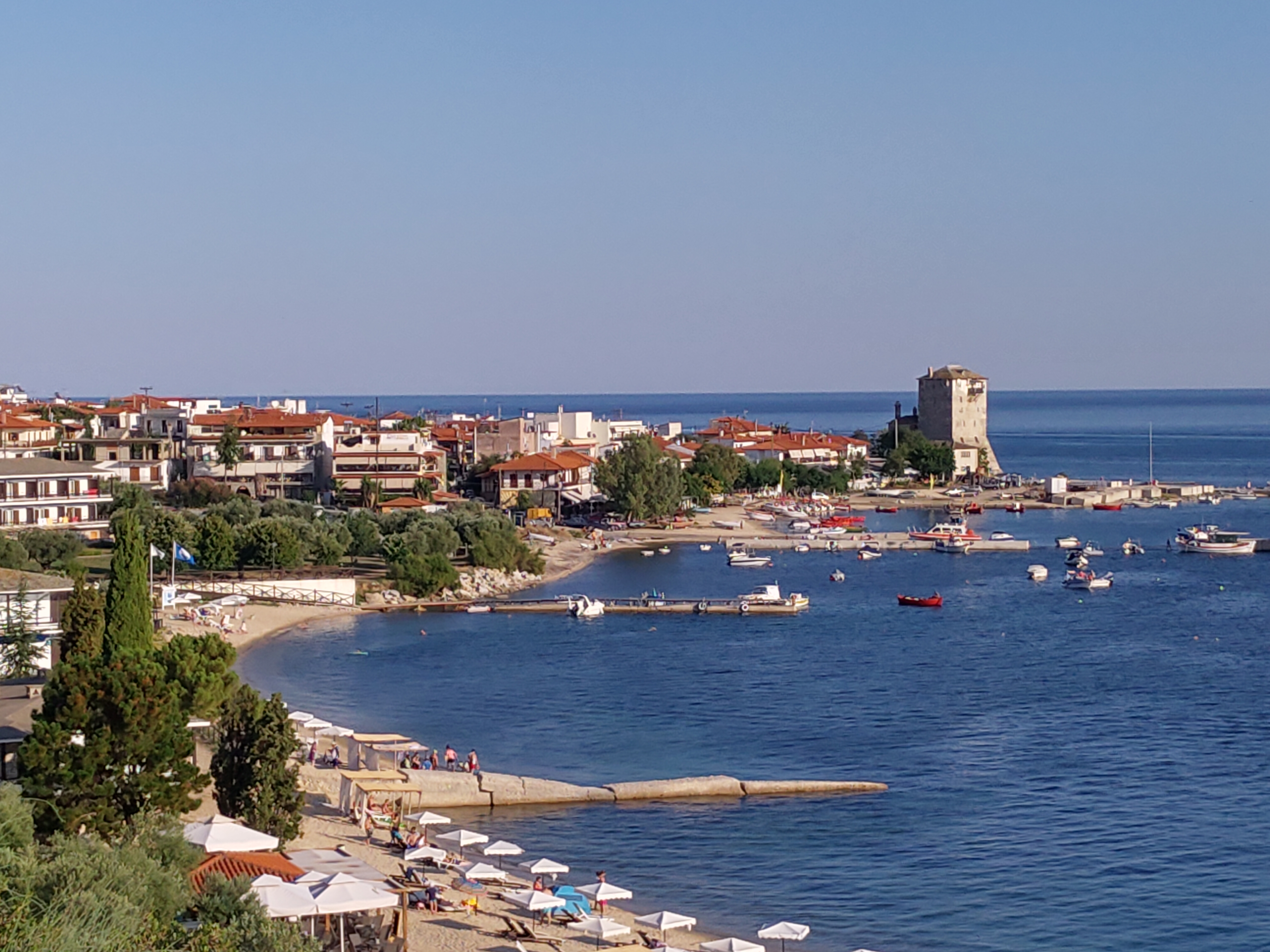
- View of Ouranoupoli

- Location within Greece
- Coordinates: 40°19′35″N 23°58′52″E
- Country: Greece
- Administrative region: Central Macedonia
- Regional unit: Chalkidiki
- Municipality: Aristotelis
- Municipal unit: Stagira-Akanthos

Population (2021)
  - Community: 801
- Time zone: UTC+2 (EET)
  - Summer (DST): UTC+3 (EEST)
- Vehicle registration: ΧΚ

Ouranoupoli (Greek: Ουρανούπολη, lit. 'Sky City', formerly Ouranopolis) is an ancient city and a modern village in Chalcidice, Greece. It is part of the municipality Aristotelis.

== Location ==
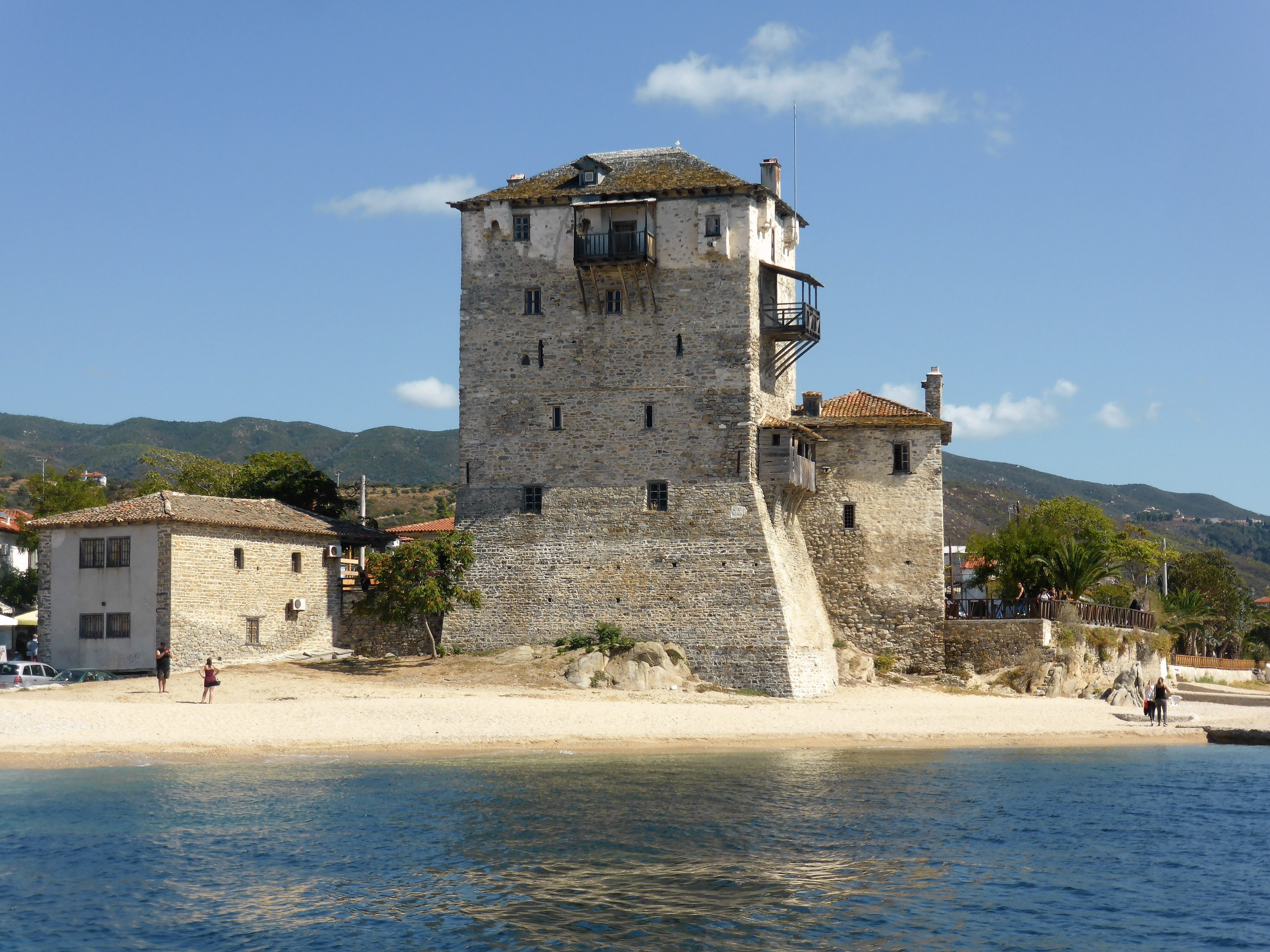
The Byzantine Tower at the beach

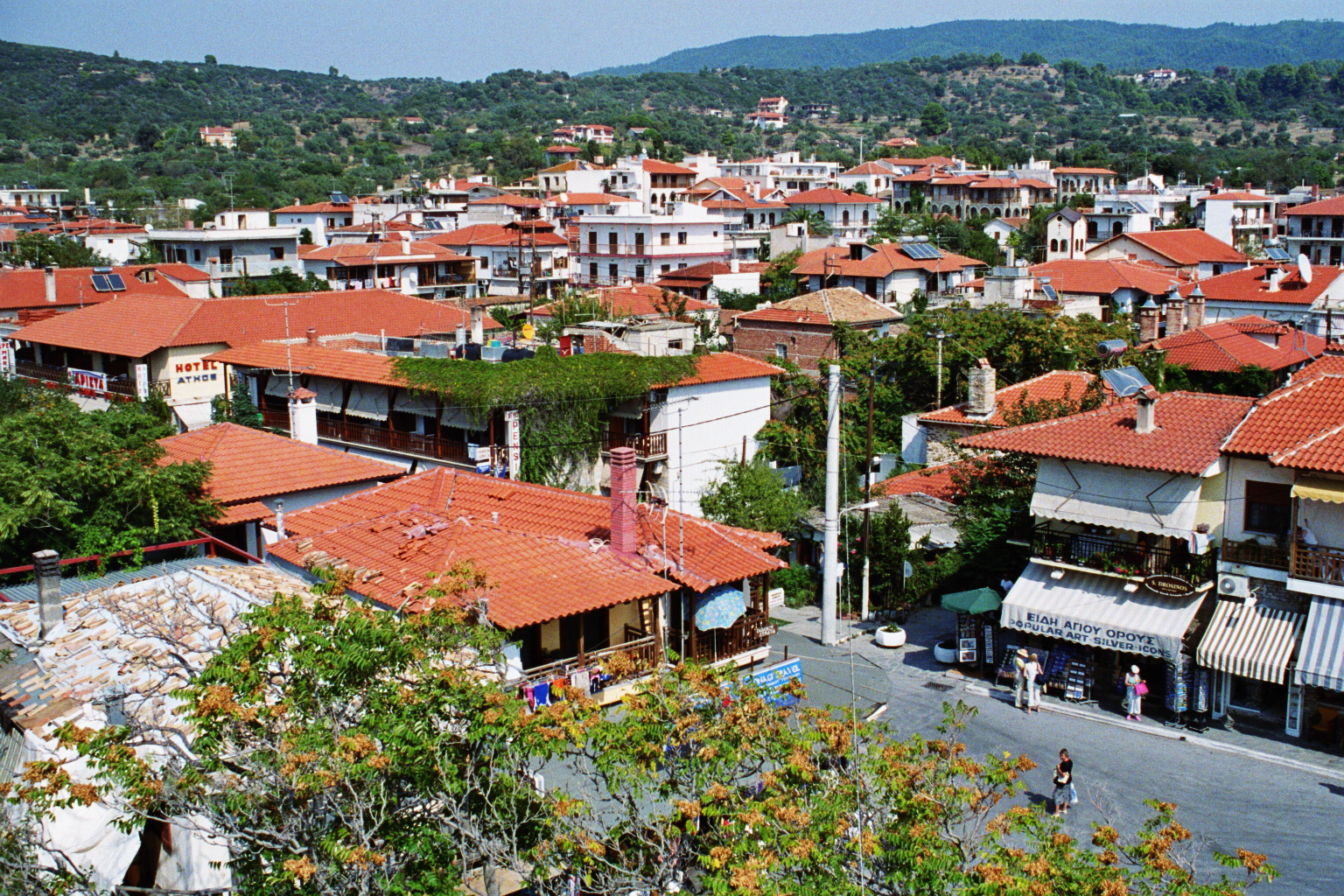
View of the village

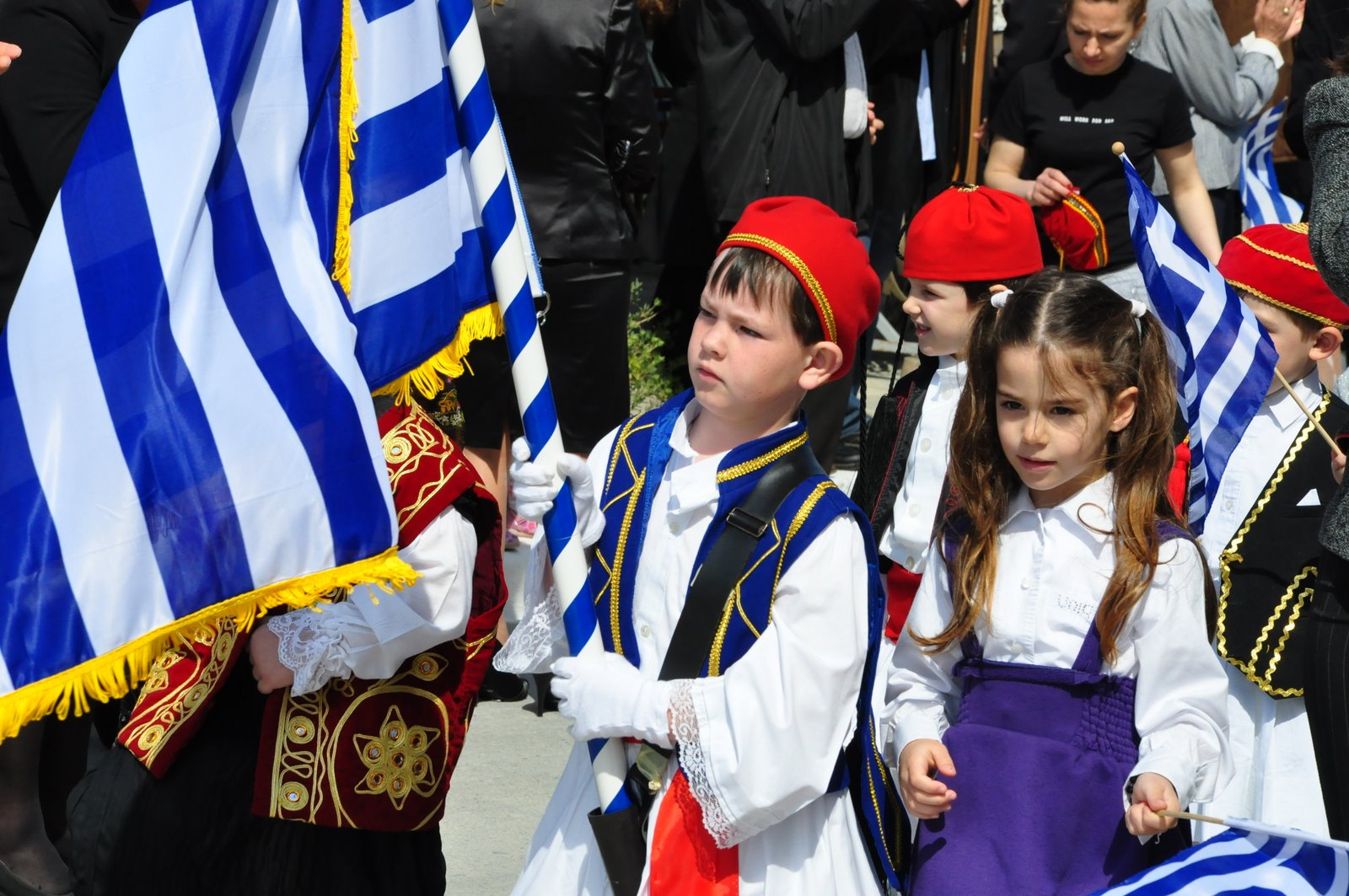
25th March Independence Day. Children parade in Ouranopolis.

The village of Ouranoupoli is situated on the coastline in the northwest part (the very beginning) of the Athos peninsula, part of the bigger Chalkidiki peninsula. It is the last settlement before the border with the monastic state of Mount Athos (the Holy Mountain). The city of Thessaloniki is about 140 km from Ouranoupoli and approximately 140 km from the city of Kavala.

== History ==
The village was named after the nearby ancient city of Uranopolis that was founded by Cassander's brother Alexarchus in the late 4th century BC. and was later destroyed by an earthquake.

In the 1920s, many Greek refugees from Asia Minor (now Turkey) settled in the village and established rug manufacturing.

In 1926, the old Tower of Prosforion was leased from the monks of Vatopedi to Sydney and Joice Loch who were based there till their deaths in 1955 and 1982. The tower now houses the Christian Chalkidiki Exhibition.

In 1956, a road was built to the village along the old pilgrim route.

== Attractions ==
- The Byzantine Tower of Ouranoupoli (also known as Prosfori, or "The Offering") was built by Emperor Andronikos II Palaiologos during the 13th century, who placed it under the jurisdiction of Vatopedi Monastery. However, in 1922, the Greek government confiscated the area from the monastery to accommodate Greek refugees from Turkey during the population exchange between Greece and Turkey. In 1928, Sydney Loch and his wife Joice NanKivell Loch moved into the tower, where they maintained a presence for decades as they used it as an important meeting place for both monks and laymen passing to and from Mount Athos. The Lochs also owned a carpet-weaving enterprise in Ouranoupoli, employing many locals.
- Zygou Monastery, a former monastery that was abandoned in 1198 and occupied by the Crusaders during the beginning of the 1200s; hence it is also known as Frangokastro, or the "Castle of the Franks." The archaeological site can be visited by walking eastward along the coast from the town of Ouranoupoli up to around the Mount Athos border.
- Agios Nikolaos Church (Greek: Αγίου Νικολάου Oυρανούπολης), ruins of a Byzantine church that was occupied from the 11th to 14th centuries. The ruins are located in the middle of the peninsula by the Mount Athos border.

== Transportation ==
A single asphalt road connects Ouranoupoli with Thessaloniki. Ouranoupoli is served by several regular daily buses from the KTEL Chalkidiki bus station in the southern part of Thessaloniki city. There are regular daily ferries for male pilgrims to Mount Athos that take them from the main port of Ouranoupoli to Dafni, Mount Athos, but pilgrims must first obtain a diamonitirion from the Mount Athos Pilgrims' Bureau. During the summer, there are also cruises for tourists that take visitors on a sightseeing tour of the coast of Mount Athos. Women are allowed on the cruise, since the boats are not allowed to pass within 500 metres of the Mount Athos coastline.

== Sources ==
- De Vries, Susanna. Blue Ribbons, Bitter Bread, 2000.
- Tarn, William Woodthorpe. The Greeks in Bactria & India, 1950.
