= Ierissos =

Ierissos Ιερισσός
- Community
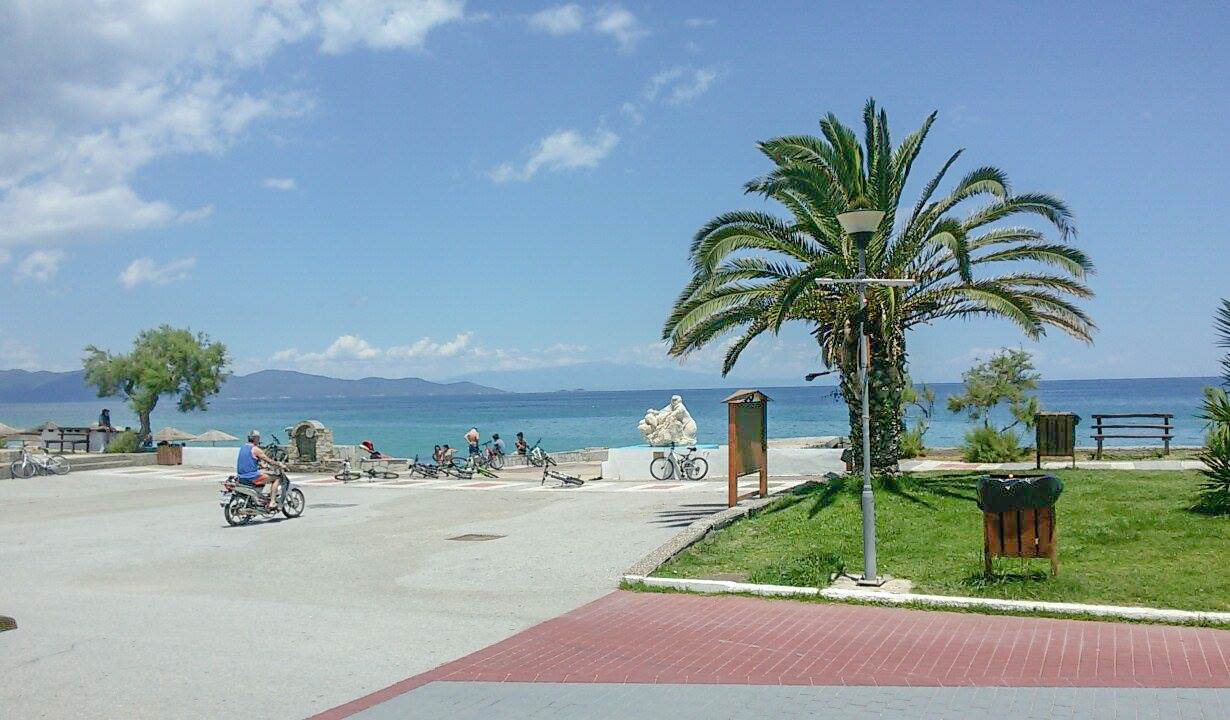
- Ierissos

- Location within Greece
- Coordinates: 40°24′N 23°53′E
- Country: Greece
- Administrative region: Central Macedonia
- Regional unit: Chalkidiki
- Municipality: Aristotelis
- Municipal unit: Stagira-Akanthos

Population (2021)
  - Community: 3,208
- Time zone: UTC+2 (EET)
  - Summer (DST): UTC+3 (EEST)
- Vehicle registration: ΧΚ

Ierissos (Greek: Ιερισσός) is a small town on the east coast of the Akti peninsula in Chalkidiki, Greece. It is located 115 km from Thessaloniki, and 10 km from the border of the Autonomous Monastic State of the Holy Mountain, or Mount Athos. It is the site of Ancient city and former bishopric Hierissus, and as such remains a Latin Catholic titular see. Ferries run from Ierissos to the east coast of Mount Athos.

Since the 2011 local government reform Ierissos has been the seat of the municipality of Aristotelis, and of the municipal unit of Stagira-Akanthos.

== Names ==
The name of Ierissos is derived from the Latin Ericius, a translation of Akanthos, the name of the ancient city (also Latinized as Acanthus) located on a ridge bordering the southeast side of the town, 0.6 km (2,000 ft) from it.

== History ==
Akanthos, near mount Athos, was an Ancient Greek city in the Roman province of Macedonia Prima (civil diocese of Macedonia)) During the Byzantine era Erissos was the seat of a bishopric, evidenced from 883 (see below). From the 10th century onwards, the town's history is indissolubly linked with that of Mount Athos. In 942 there were disputes between Ierissos and the monks of Mount Athos over the borders between Ierissos and the monastic community's lands and, the following year, the differences were settled in person by a large commission of major politicians and church officials.

In the summer of 1425, Ierissos came into the hands of the Turks. During that time the Venetians, starting from Cassandreia, landed on the coastline of Ierissos, burnt down the settlement (by then only a large village) and its surroundings and (on departure) set alight the castle and five towers. Under Ottoman rule, Ierissos was one of the privileged Mademochoria. In 1821 Ierissos took part in the Greek War of Independence and during the repression the village was burnt down by the Turks and a large number of residents killed.

In 1932 the village was destroyed by a powerful earthquake, with 121 people killed and approximately 500 injured. After the earthquake the new Ierissos was built in its current position, a little north west of the ancient city.

== Ecclesiastical history ==
The bishopric was a suffragan of the Metropolitan Archdiocese of Thessalonica, in the sway of the Patriarchate of Constantinople.

Its only historically documented bishop was Elia, flourishing in 1054, known from a seal.

=== Titular see ===
The diocese was nominally restored in 1927 as Latin Catholic Titular bishopric of Hierisus (Latin) / Geriso (Curiate Italian; ). It was renamed in 1929 Hierissus (Latin) / Geriso (dropped in 1933) or Gerisso (Italian) / Hierissen(sis) (Latin adjective).

It is vacant, having had the following incumbents, so far of the fitting Episcopal (lowest) rank:

- Giuseppe Antonio Caruso (1928.07.06 – death 1930.01.03) as emeritate; previously Bishop of Cariati (Italy) (1919.03.10 – 1927.08.26), Bishop of Oppido Mamertina (Italy) (1927.08.26 – 1928.07.06)
- Teodoro Eugenín Barrientos, Picpus Fathers (SS.CC.) (1931.04.10 – death 1974.12.24), first as Apostolic Administrator of the then 'permanent' Apostolic Administration of Valdivia (Chile, now a diocese) (1931.04.10 – 1942.06.20), then as Military Vicar of Chile (Chile) (1942.06.20 – retired 1959.12.21) and on emeritate.

== See also ==
- List of Catholic dioceses in Greece

== Bibliography ==
- Michel Lequien, Oriens christianus in quatuor Patriarchatus digestus, Paris 1740, vol; II, coll. 99-102
- Konrad Eubel, Hierarchia Catholica Medii Aevi, vol. 5, p. 66; vol. 6, p. 62; vol. 7, p. 56; vol. 8, p. 71
