= Aristotelis (municipality) =

Aristotelis Αριστοτέλης
- Municipality
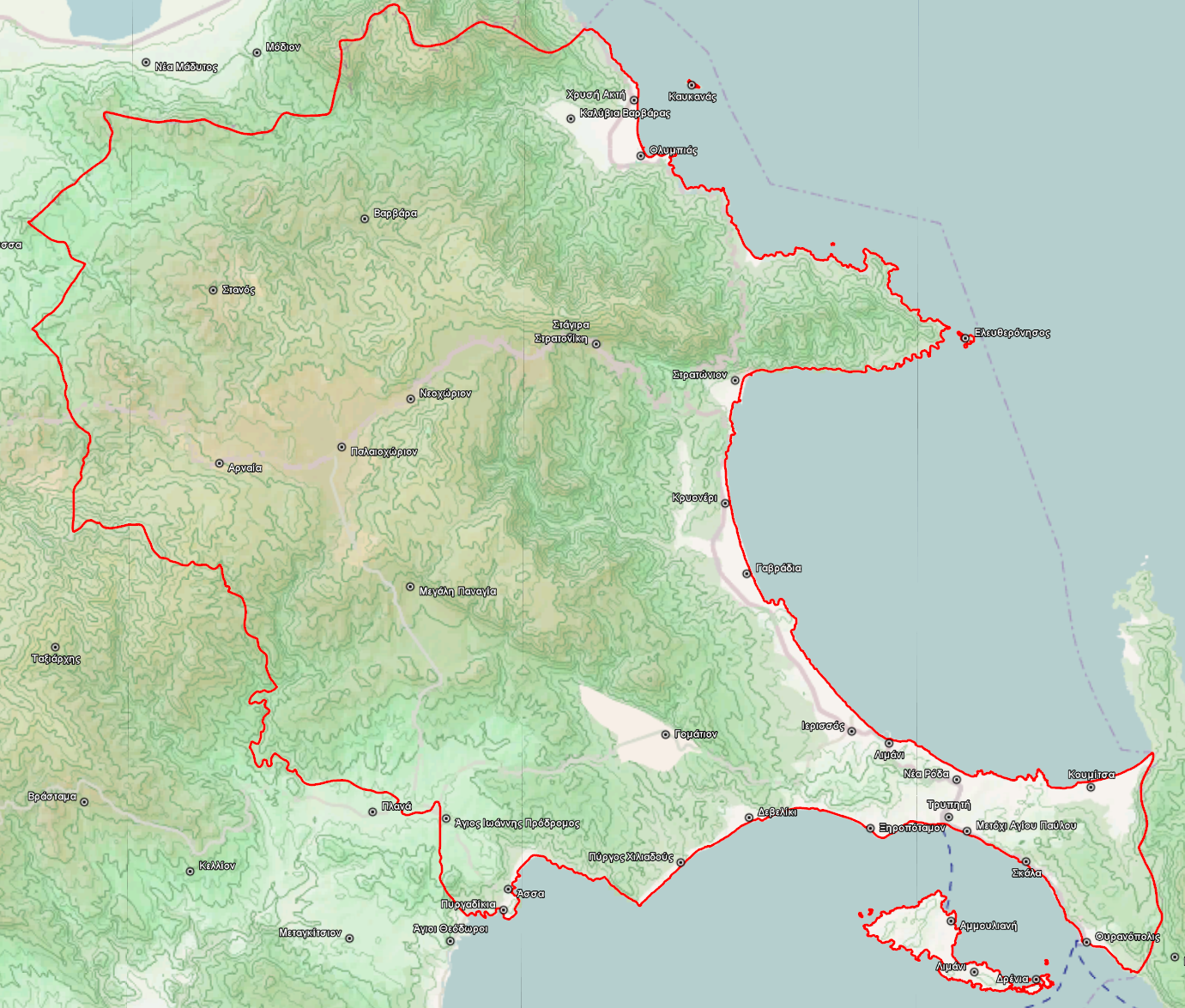

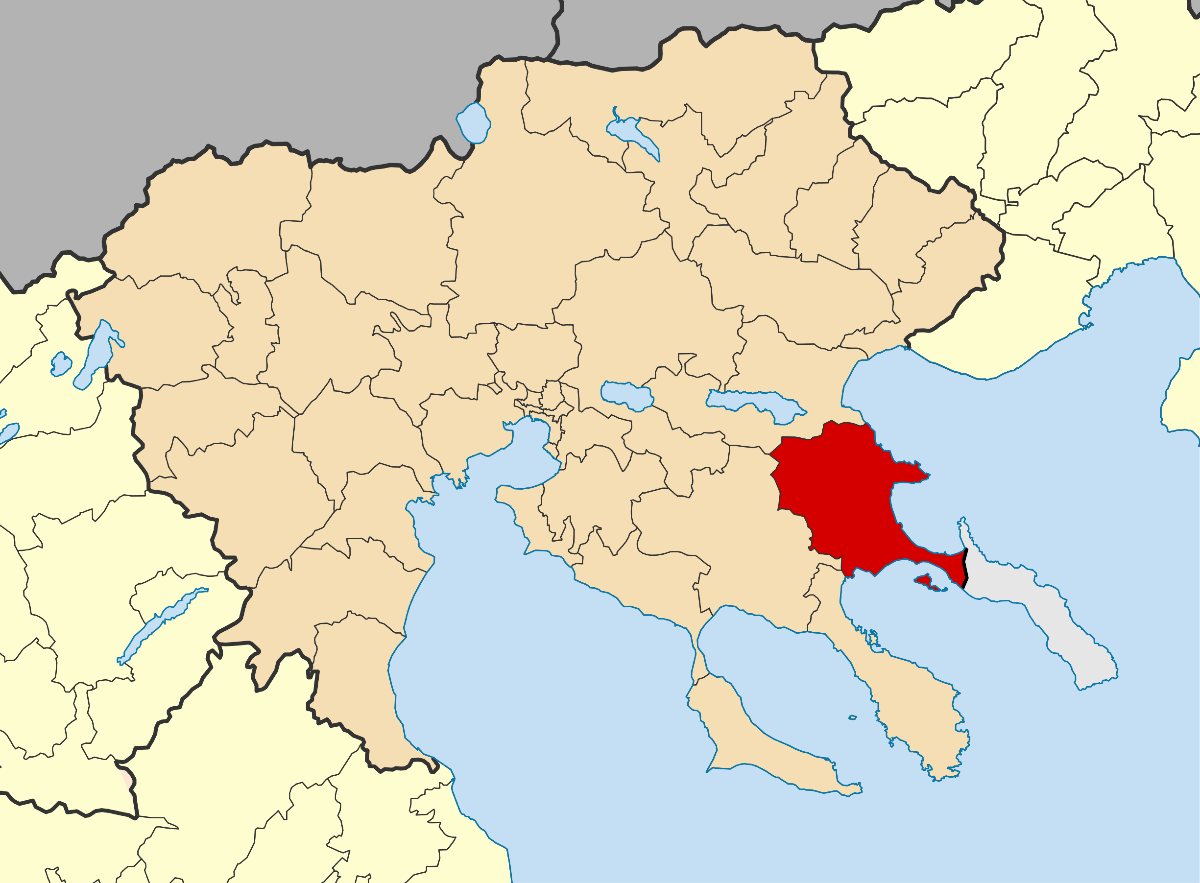

- Location within Greece
- Coordinates: 40°24′N 23°53′E
- Country: Greece
- Administrative region: Central Macedonia
- Regional unit: Chalkidiki
- Seat: Ierissos

Area
  - Municipality: 747.0 km^{2} (288.4 sq mi)

Population (2021)
  - Municipality: 16,964
  - Density: 22.71/km^{2} (58.82/sq mi)
- Time zone: UTC+2 (EET)
  - Summer (DST): UTC+3 (EEST)

Aristotelis (Greek: Αριστοτέλης) is a municipality in the Chalkidiki regional unit, Central Macedonia, Greece. The seat of the municipality is the town Ierissos. The municipality is named after the ancient philosopher Aristotle, whose birthplace, Stagira, lies within its bounds. The municipality also includes the area of the mining villages, known as Mademochoria. On the East, it borders the Monastic community of Mount Athos.

== Municipality ==
The municipality Aristotelis was formed at the 2011 local government reform by the merger of the following 3 former municipalities, that became municipal units:

- Arnaia
- Panagia
- Stagira-Akanthos

The municipality has an area of 747.015 km^{2}.
