= List of highways numbered 16A =

The following highways are numbered 16A:

== Canada ==
- Alberta Highway 16A
- Manitoba Highway 16A
- Prince Edward Island Route 16A
- Saskatchewan Highway 16A

== Greece ==
- EO16a road, a branch of the EO16 from Agios Prodromos to Polygyros

== United States ==
- U.S. Route 16A
- County Road 16A (Clay County, Florida)
  - County Road 16A (St. Johns County, Florida)
- Nebraska Spur 16A
- New Hampshire Route 16A
- New York State Route 16A (former)
- Secondary State Highway 16A (Washington)
