= Gerakini =

Gerakini Γερακινή
- Settlement
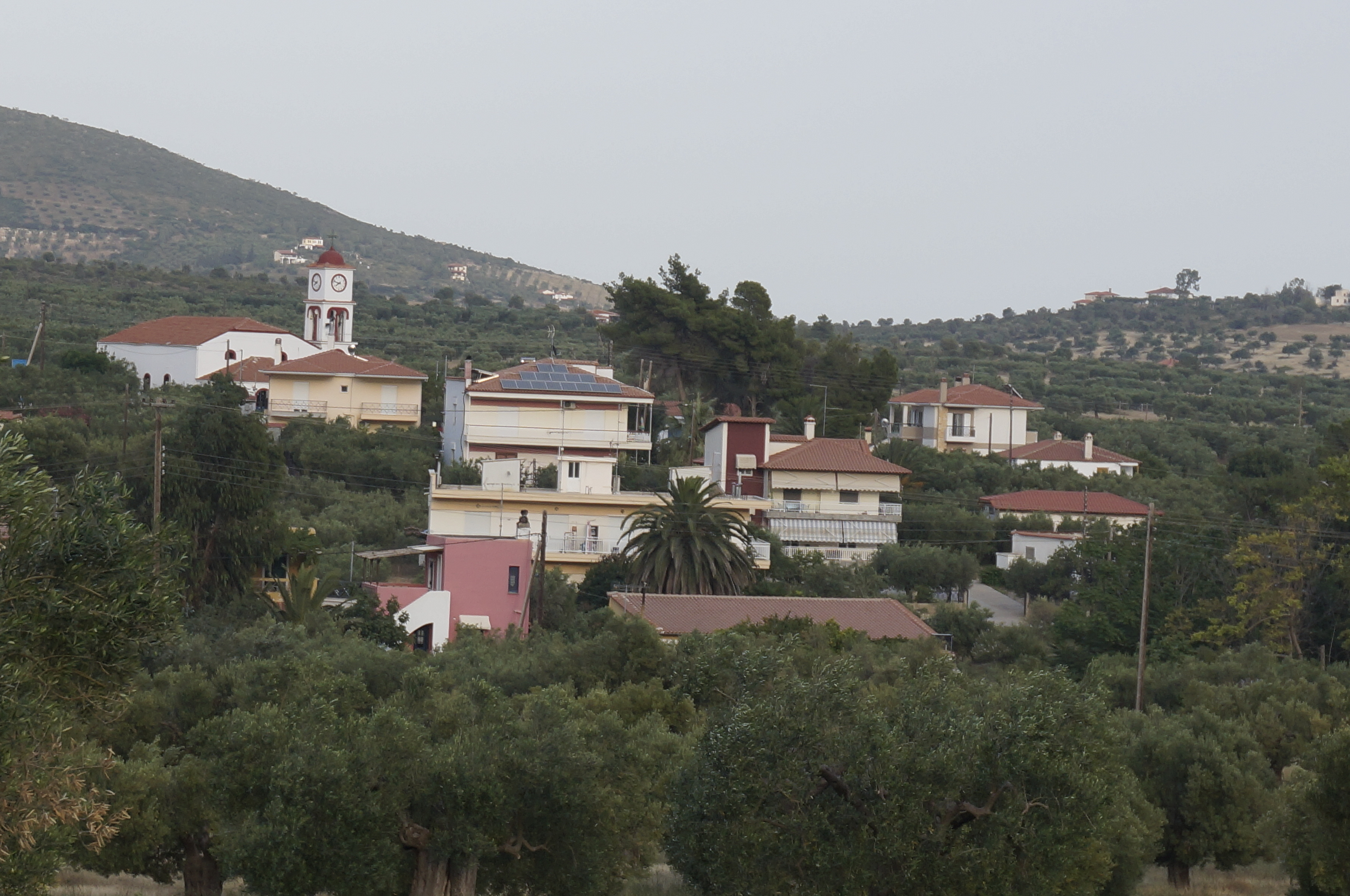
- Part of Yerakini as seen from the west

- Location within Greece
- Coordinates: 40°17′N 23°27′E
- Country: Greece
- Administrative region: Central Macedonia
- Regional unit: Chalkidiki
- Municipality: Polygyros
- Highest elevation: 100 m (330 ft)
- Lowest elevation: 0 m (0 ft)
- Time zone: UTC+2 (EET)
  - Summer (DST): UTC+3 (EEST)
- Postal code: 631 00
- Area code: +30 23710
- Vehicle registration: ΧΚ

Gerakini or Yerakini (Greek: Γερακινή Greek pronunciation: [ʝeɾaciˈni], locally [ʝiracˈɲi]) is a village on the Chalkidiki peninsula in Central Macedonia, Northern Greece. It was an official settlement within the municipality of Polygyros until it was abolished in 2001.

It has been the port of nearby Polygyros, the capital of Chalkidiki, ever since its settlement. It has the largest magnesite deposits in Northern Greece.

== Etymology ==
The word Γερακινή (Yerakini) comes from γερακίνα (yerakina ([jeɾaˈcina]), meaning female peregrine falcon (falcon-gentle) (from γεράκι ([jeˈɾaci]), from ιέραξ ([iˈeɾaks]) falcon). There is a legend that the name came from a queen named Yerakina (Gerakina) who once lived in Yerakini.

== History ==
In the late 1800s and early 1900s, Yerakini and nearby Kalyves Polygyrou were settled by farmers from Polygyros. The villages themselves are Greek municipalities.

Until the 1960s, there was one olive oil mill in the area, on the central beach owned by the Haji Osman family. During World War II the occupying German army, among other activities, extended the main dock, to accommodate freight vessels for their use. Divers and amateur fishers used both parts of the dock for diving and fishing. There was also a lighthouse on the right side of the main dock.

=== Present day ===
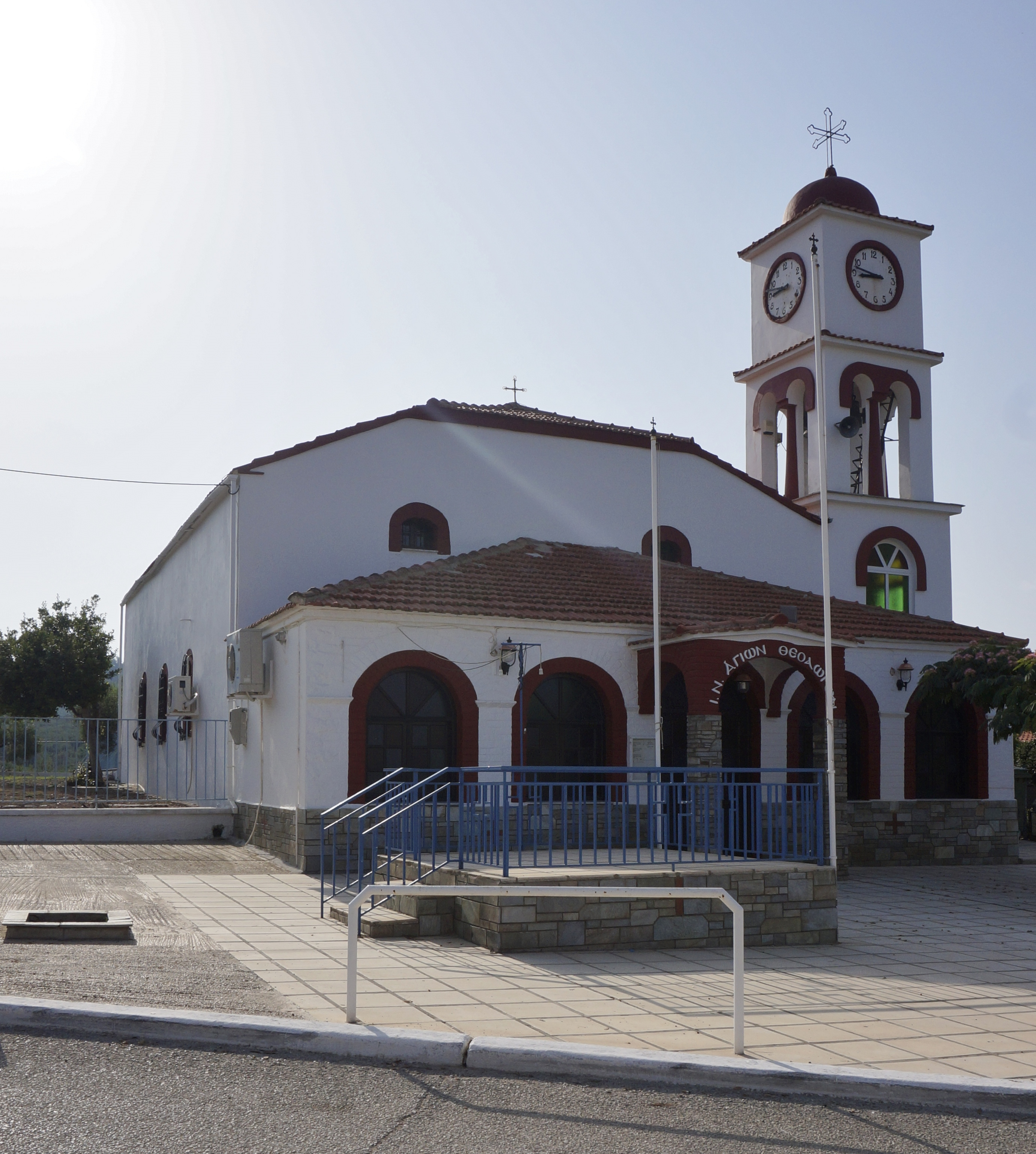
Agioi Theodoroi church

The village of Yerakini has the church of patron saints Agioi Theodoroi (dedicated to two saints having the same name Theodoros).

The annual feast-day commemorating the saints is held on the first Saturday of Lent, the religious church service being officiated by Metropolitan Nicodemus of Kassandra, the people celebrating with a number of seaside activities.

All land (fields, plains, and slopes as well as the greater part of the Trikorfo (three peaks) mountain in the east, 3.5 km from Yerakini) is covered with olive groves. The inhabitants are farmers principally growing olives for the table and their oil.

There are several olive oil mills in the area (in Polygyros, Kalyves Polygyrou, Olynthos, Ormylia) and companies for green table olives preservation. Olives are harvested while green for table olives in September and, mainly for olive oil, when black in November and December. The language spoken is the Greek dialect of Chalkidiki, as spoken in its capital Polygyros. Yerakini has a soccer team, which plays against other teams of Chalkidiki. Although the village itself is not tourist-oriented, holidaymakers visit it especially for the Divine Liturgy (the Sunday Mass of the Orthodox) of the church and on saints' feast days.

== Geography ==
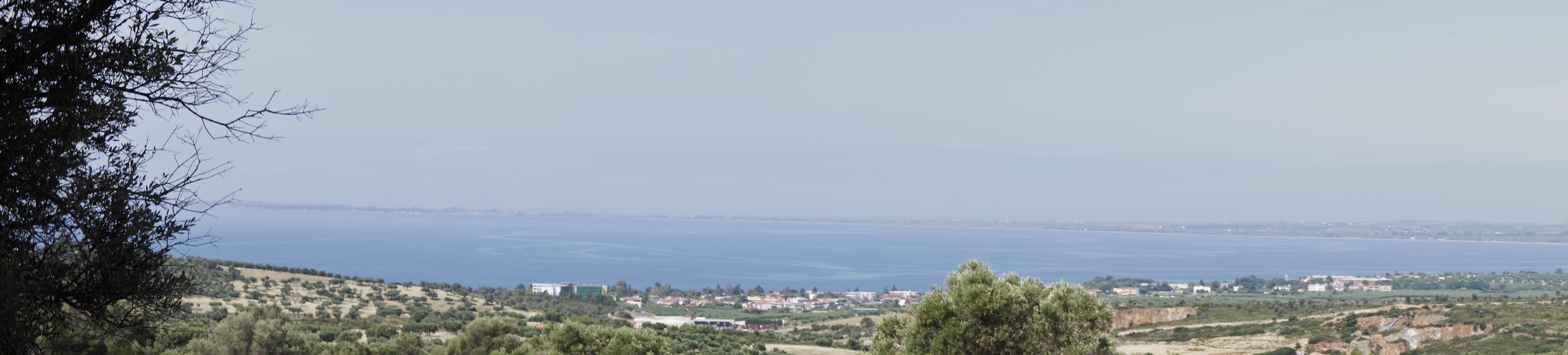
Panoramic view of the Gulf of Torone from the Trikorfo mountain

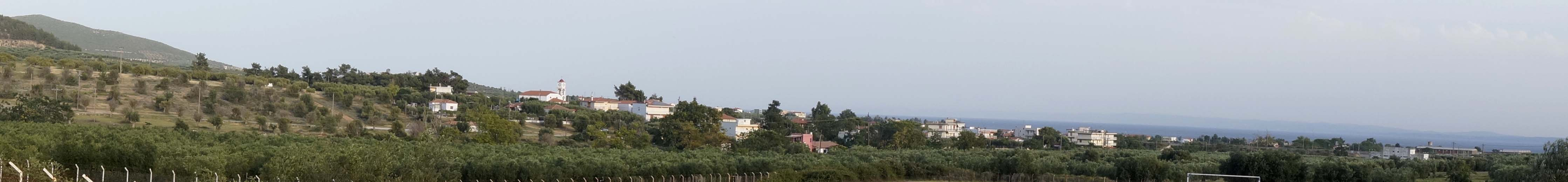
The village of Yerakini with the mountain Trikorfo on the left and the sea on the right

Yerakini lies on the Toronean Gulf, between the two peninsulas of Kassandra and Sithonia, southeast of Thessaloniki.

Nearby towns are Nea Potidaia (1559), Agios Mamas (841), Kalyves Polygyrou (1333) (the population of Kalyves Polygyrou is combined with Yerakini's in the 2011 census) Yerakini, Psakoudia (299), Metamorfosi (531) and Nikiti (2711), which comprise the gulf's northern sea-side villages.

Yerakini is at a driving distance of 14.5 km (9 mi.) from Polygyros, 77 km (48 mi.) from Thessaloniki, via Polygyros, or 78 km, via Nea Moudania, and 66 km (41 mi.) from the Thessaloniki International Airport.

=== Seaside ===
The southern part, the sea-side, of Yerakini (Παραλία Γερακινής, [paɾaˈlia ʝeɾaciˈnis]) is where the Customs Office is situated. It is a part of the coastline stretching from Psakoudia (Ψακούδια [psaˈku ðʝa]) (5 km from Yerakini) to the east, to Kalyves Polygyrou to the west. The Yerakini coast covers the area between Trikorfo beach (formerly known as "Tou Iatrou i Kalyva" locally τ’ Ιατρού η καλύβα) and that of the "Kalamaras and Pangalos" summer residences (formerly "Tou Mourlakou to Pigadi", "Mourlakos' Well", locally Greek: τ’ Μουρλακ του πγιάδ [tmurˈlak du ˈbʝað]).

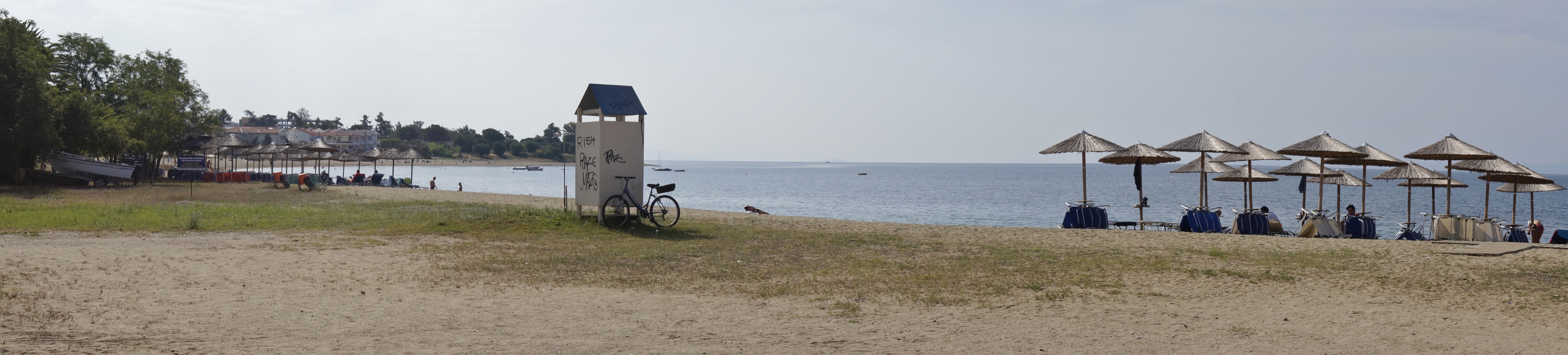
The central beach, skyline from the dock

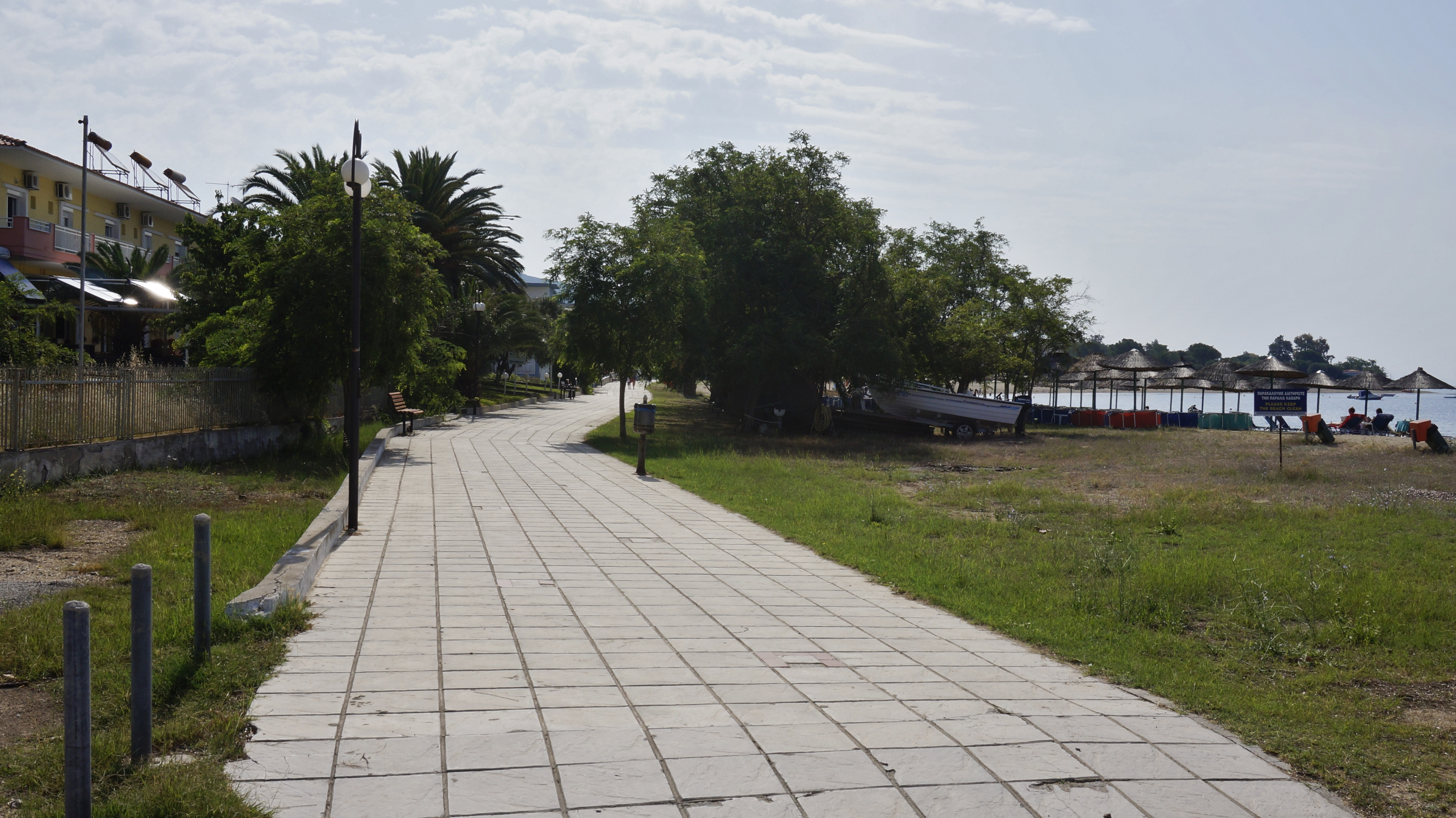
The pedestrian walk at the sea side

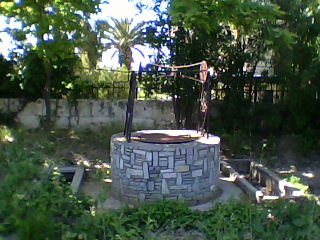
Mourlakos well

The seaside consists of white sandy beaches, and bays of various sizes: the central, the eastern, and the western are the longest ones, extending up to Kalyves Polygyrou beach, and many more smaller ones east, with clear blue waters.

The eastern seaside (between the central beach and Psakoudia) consists of Gerakina Beach, Douros Residences (Yerakini Mare), Kipoupolis (Garden Town), Porto Maria, Kouyoni beach, Sonia Village Beach, Galini, and Trikorfo beach. The western seaside (between the central beach and the Mecyberna complex) consists of Lazaridika, Megika, Bazakeika (Martha Haus), Katsarou, Goloika, The Well (Pigadi), Nea Kalyvia, Alkinoos, Poseidon, Scorpios, Toronis, Amphitrite, Gerania and Sermyle Complex, Sermyle Complex, Gerania, Amphitrite, Toronis, Scorpios, Poseidon, Alkinoos, Nea Kalyvia, and Molyvopyrgos beaches. It has bay beaches and inlets especially at the eastern rocky sea-coast joining the pine wooded Psakoudia beach, the main beach of Ormylia.

=== Climate ===
The climate is Mediterranean and temperate throughout the year with mild winters (very rarely below 0 °C) and clear skies most of the year, which contributes considerably to the growing of olives in the area, and allows shepherds from other regions, especially in the past, to winter their flocks of sheep, goats and other animals. The average temperature ranges from 10 degrees °C. in winter to 35 degrees °C. in summer.

== Economy ==
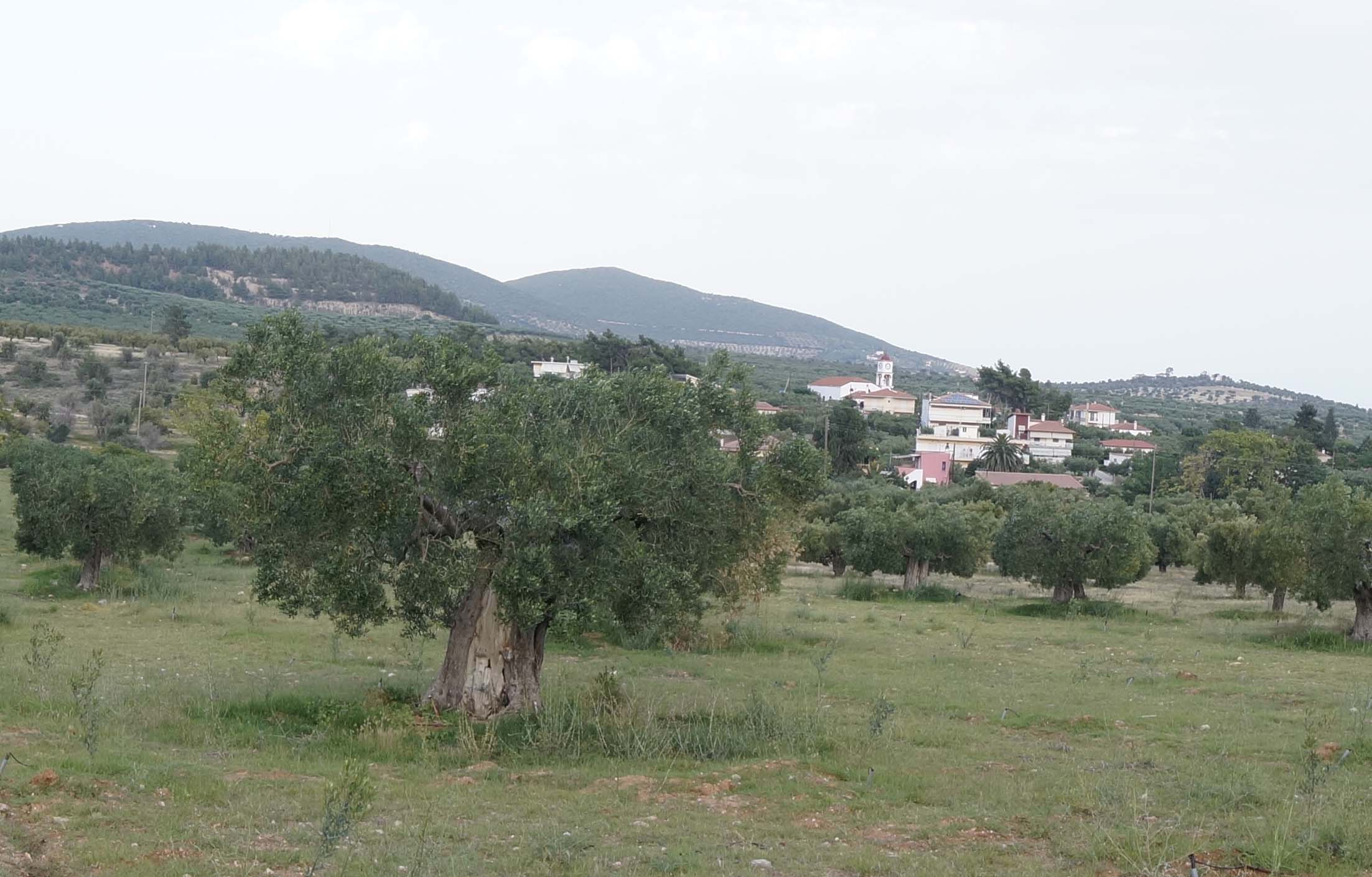
Olive trees with the village and the Trikorfo mountain in the background

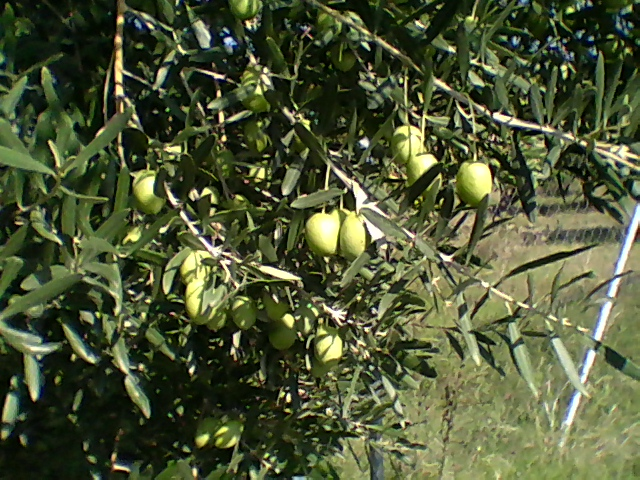
Green olives of Chalkidiki on the tree before harvest

=== Agriculture ===
Yerakini's chief agricultural activity is farming green olives. The village is the center of olive growing in Chalkidiki, hence the first green olive preservation plant of Chalkidiki was established here by the government in the seventies. Olive husbandry has developed rapidly in recent years as the monoculture of the farmers.

=== Tourism ===
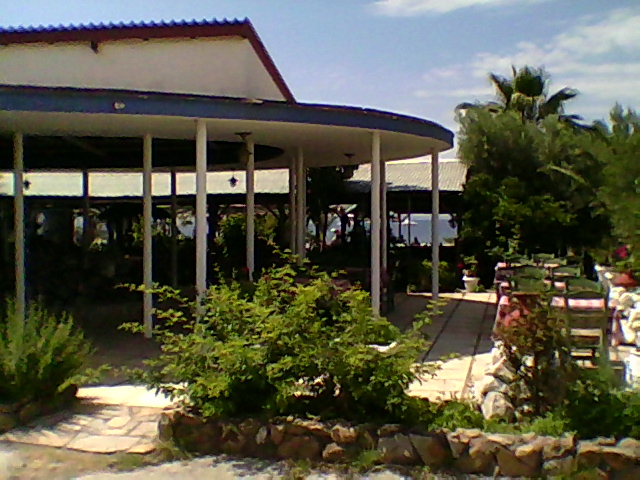
The tourist pavilion built in 1959 at the central beach

Tourism in Chalkidiki officially began in the late 1950s (Tourism Development Plan by Prime Minister Konstantinos Karamanlis), and in the late 1960s it was declared one of four areas of "Prime Zone for Tourism Development in Greece", the other three being Corfu, Rhodes, and Crete. The Yerakini seaside began development in 1959 when the official tourism development began and the first public tourist pavilion started operating. Similar pavilions opened in Olympiada and Ierissos. In the early 1970s the first hotel and bungalows summer resort in Chalkidiki, Gerakina Beach Hotel, opened on the eastern beach, 600 m from the central beach (currently operating, after reconstruction, as Ikos Olivia). Later, more accommodations and other facilities were built for the increasing number of holidaymakers.

In the summer, Tourism is now the principal occupation for inhabitants of Yerakini, and other areas, who are involved in tourist services and selling products at the seaside, such as accommodations, food, and folk products. Yerakini's seaside is one of the main vacation resorts of Chalkidiki and attracts thousands of visitors from April to October. It can be reached by bus or car from Thessaloniki via Polygyros or Nea Moudania, or by sea, through Potidaia's canal, or by the primary opening between the two fingers of Kassandra and Sithonia. It has a mooring bay on the Aegean Sea.

Yerakini is a departure point for exploring the rest of Chalkidiki, with easy access to the peninsula and excursions to the three smaller peninsulas: Kassandra, Sithonia, and Porto Carras. Mount Athos is to the east; Stageira, Aristotle's birthplace, to the northeast; the archeological sites of Olynthus and Potidea, Petralona cave to the west; and densely wooded Mount Cholomon 15 km north. Thessaloniki, the historical Byzantine city and capital of Greek Macedonia is to the northwest.

=== Magnesite mines ===
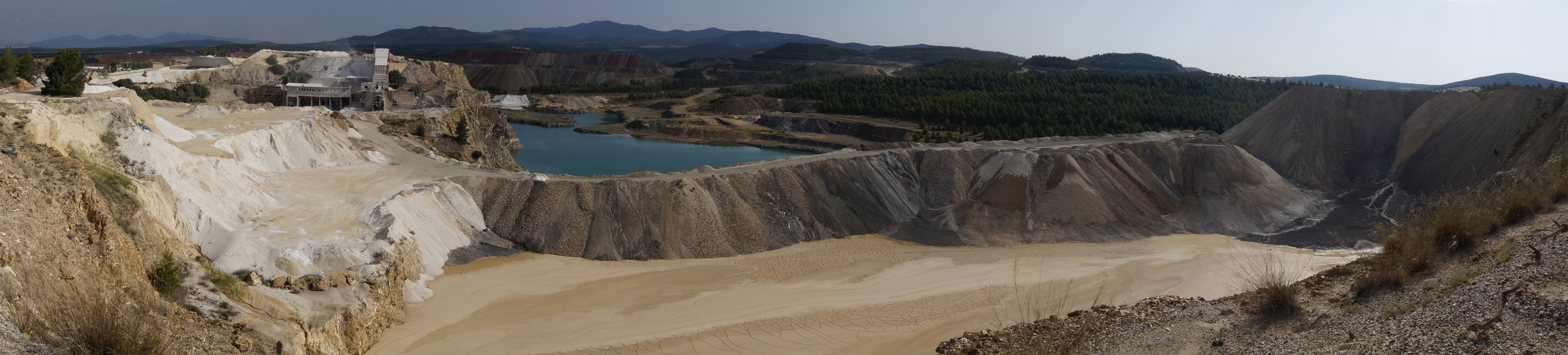
Magnesite quarries in Yerakini

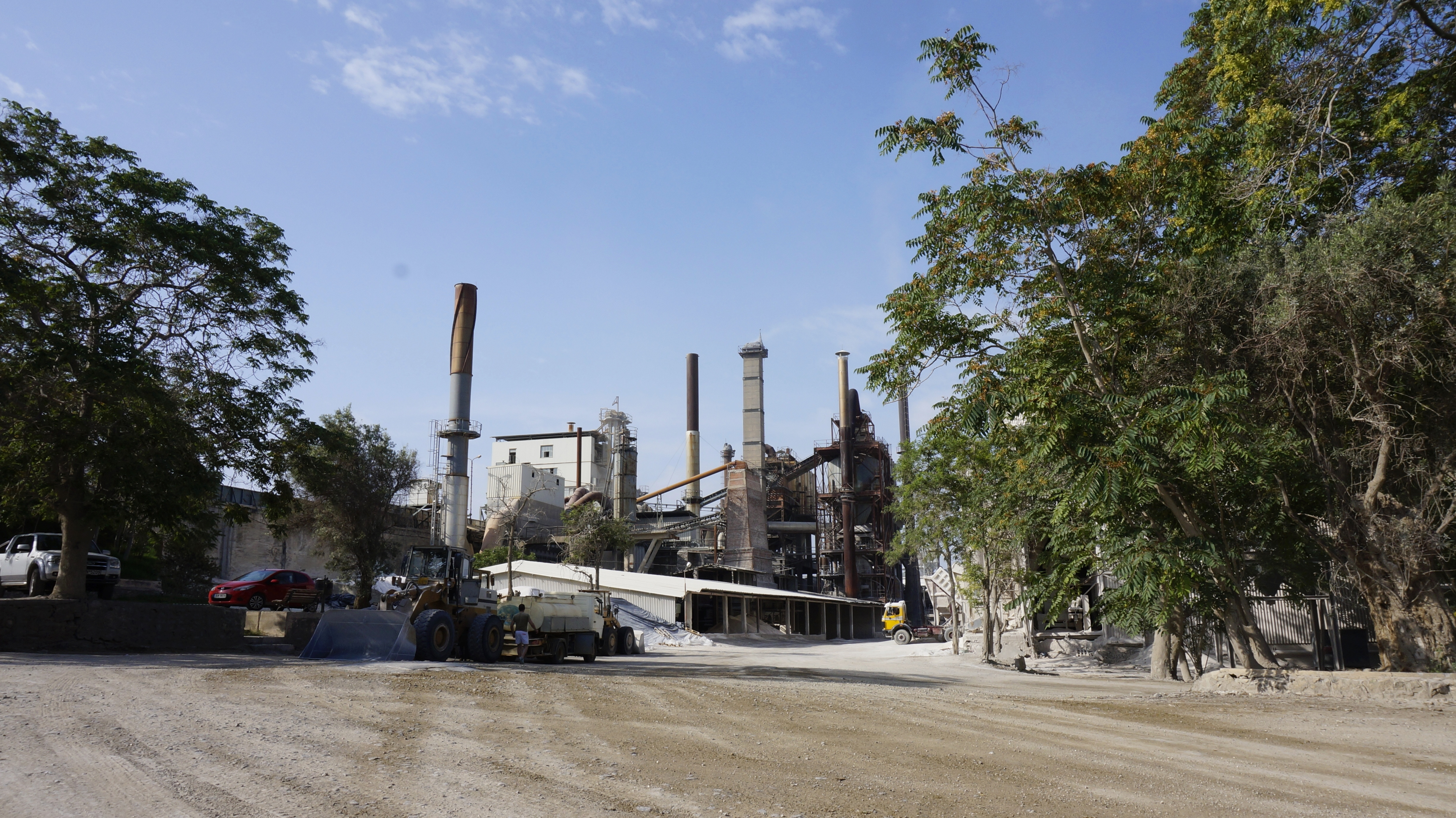
Magnesite plant northern side

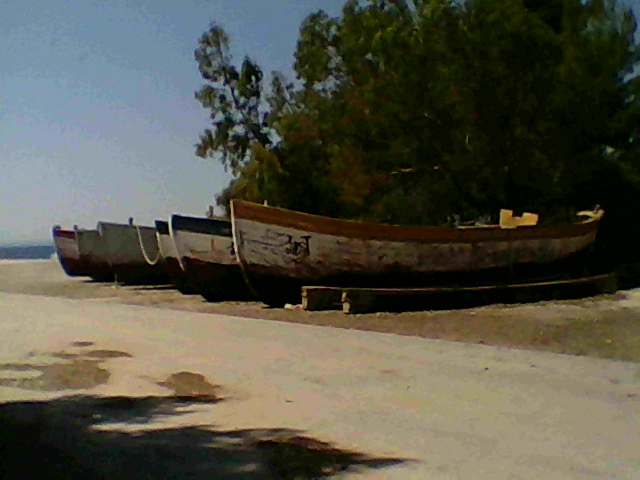
Hoys used for carrying magnesite to bulkers

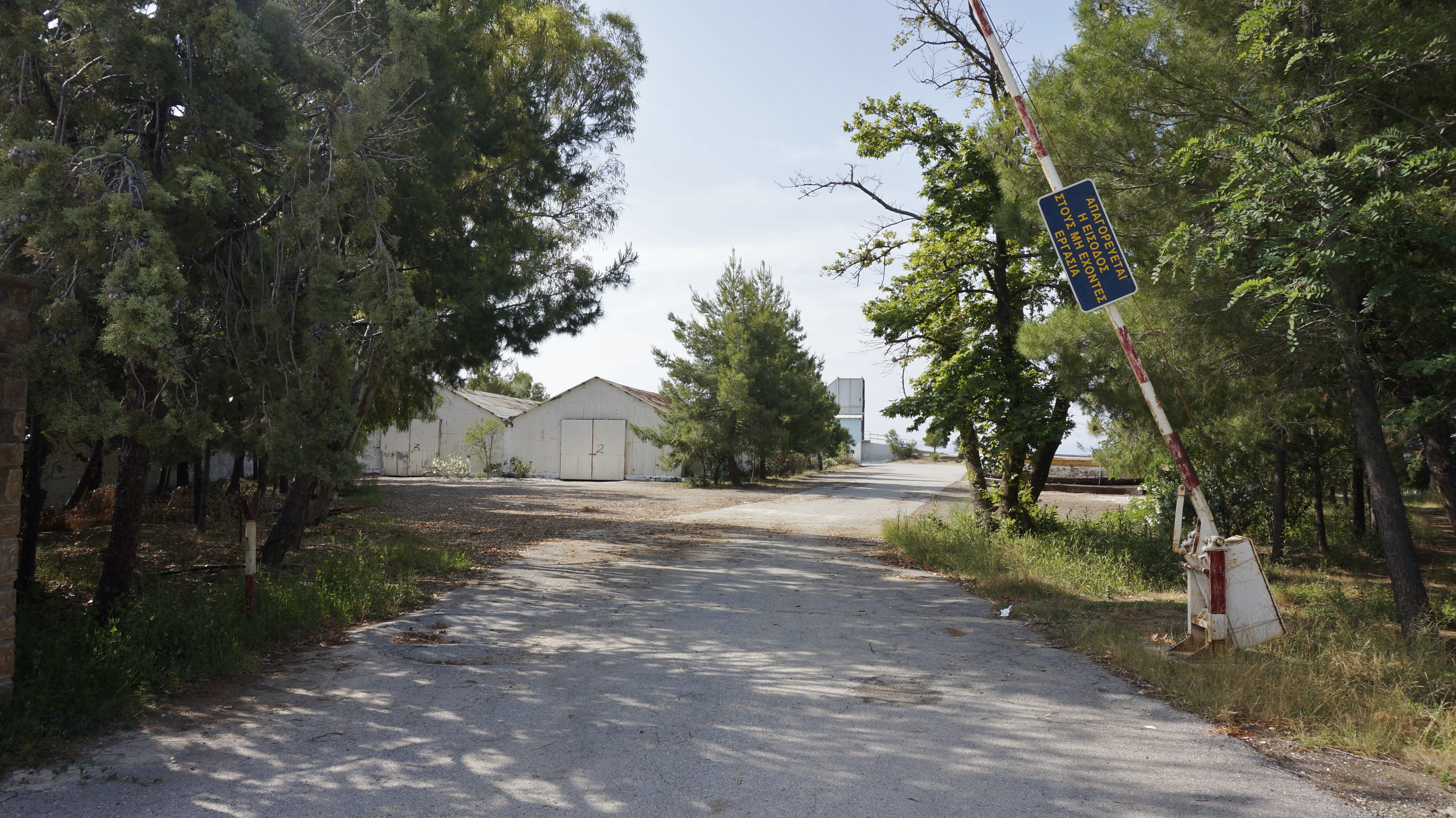
Magnesite storehouses onshore built by AGM

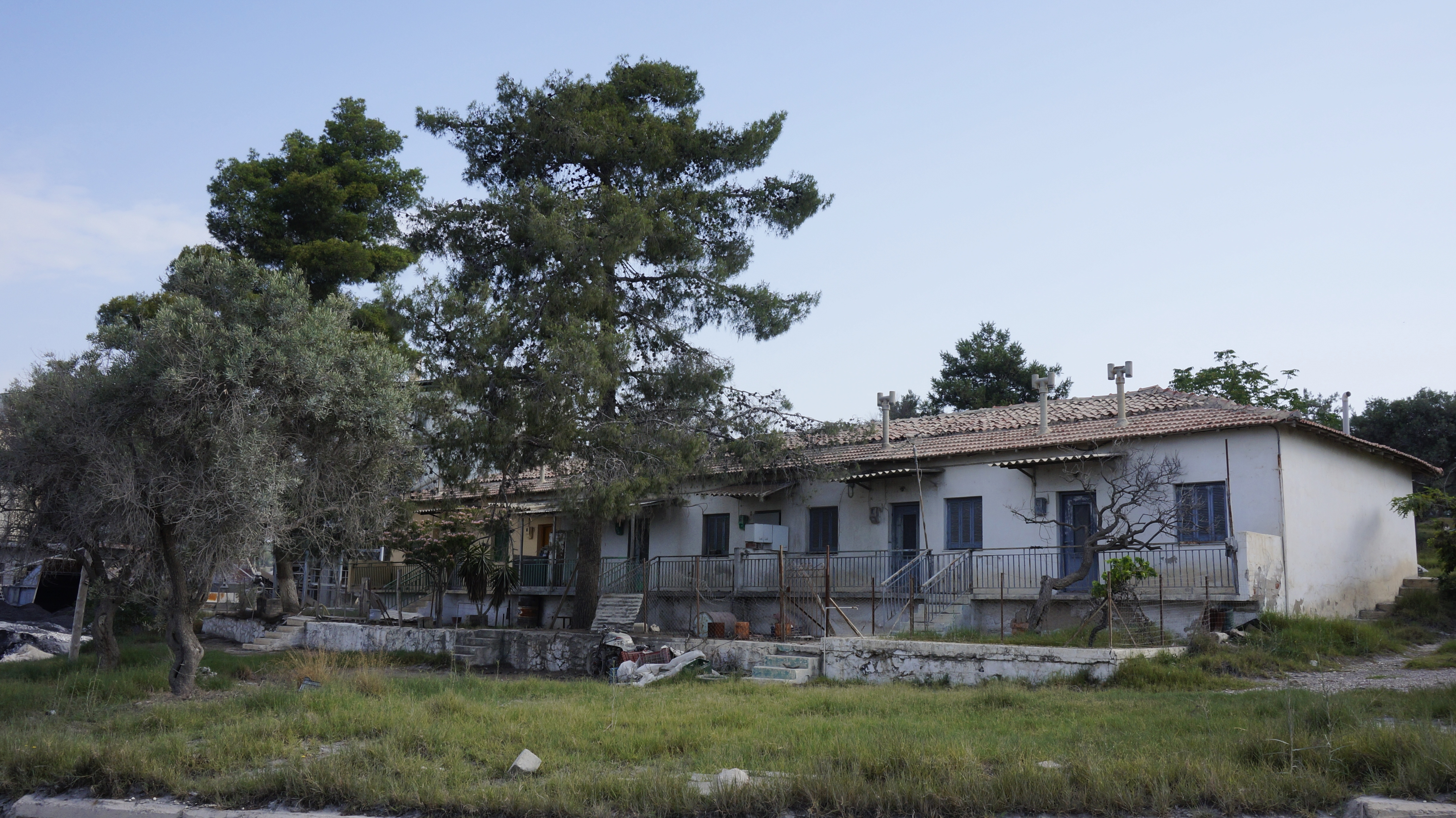
Workers’ residence built by the Anglo-Greek Magnesite Co. LTD

While the topsoil is suitable for olive cultivation, the subsoil in the area of Yerakini, as well as of Patelidas and Vavdos, is rich in magnesite. The Yerakini area has the most extensive deposits of magnesite in Greece, particularly in the north and northeast. Magnesite was first found in Atalanti and in the Province of Lokris, central Greece. Greek and foreign companies have exploited the deposits for more than 100 years with open-pit mining, kilns, etc.

The Anglo-Greek Magnesite Co. Ltd. (AGM) was the first mining operator in Yerakini and was the principal operator for the first half of the twentieth century in Greece. Galataki (near Limni) and Afrati (near Halkida) were exploited by the English company Petrified Ltd., which sold its assets to AGM in 1902. Northern Greece was also found to have magnesite in the concessions of Aghia Paraskevi (east of Thessaloniki) in small production, and in Chalkidiki's concessions of Vavdos, Patelidas (11.5 km from Yerakini), and Yerakini (the largest deposits).

AGM acquired the assets of the Societe Hellenique des Mines de Magnesite, with mines at Limni, Mantoudi, and Pyli village, on the east coast of Euboea island, in 1912. The raw material was shipped through Galataki harbour. AGM ceased its activity on Euboea island after World War II. The railway it employed (750 mm and 600 mm gauge) was dismantled, with some ruined parts still existing, and the rolling stock was sold for scrap.

In 1922, it purchased the Yerakini concession, which was producing 27,000 tons of raw material per year. The deposits were estimated at 300,000 tons in 1947. It used coal and brushwood as well as trunk wood to fuel its kilns. The Yerakini mines, about 3 km inland from the gulf, were reached by means of a narrow-gauge (565 mm) railway, used by the new owners until the 1980s. AGM operated a power system supplying electricity to the mine area in the 1950s. It organized various events and activities, such as soccer matches, weekend balls, etc.

In 1959, G. Portolos (Grecian Magnesite) bought the magnesite operations and continued the exploitation of magnesite deposits. There are other minor magnesite mining deposits, especially in the southwestern foothills of Trikorfo mountain, exploited by the Antoniou and Xenakis concern for a long period in the 1950s and 1960s. Other locales were Perachori, near Corinth; Ermioni (or Kastri); on Spetses Island in the southern Argolis in the Peloponnese; on Paros Island (Cyclades); around Thebes (Thiva), in Boeotia (Viotia); in Papades and Troupi in northern Euboea (Evia island), which was worked until the 1980s.

The mining of magnesite is mostly done by workers commuting from other areas of Chakidiki, mainly from Zervochoria (Greek: Ζερβοχώρια [zeɾvoˈxorʝa]), and other villages to the north of Chalkidiki. Most residents are workers and technicians working at plants of the Grecian Magnesite company, which was established in 1959 and mines magnesite ore. The company is 600 metres (0.37 mi) from the village, the kilns 800 metres (0.50 mi), and the quarries 1–3 kilometres (0.6–2 mi). Vessels come to the harbour of Nea Moudania, 17 kilometres (11 mi) from Yerakini, on the Thermaic gulf, near the Kassandran peninsula, to load magnesite.

== See also ==
- Greek National Tourism Organization
- Tourism in Greece
- Magnesite in Greece
- Magnesium
