= Psakoudia =

Psakoudia Ψακούδια
- Settlement
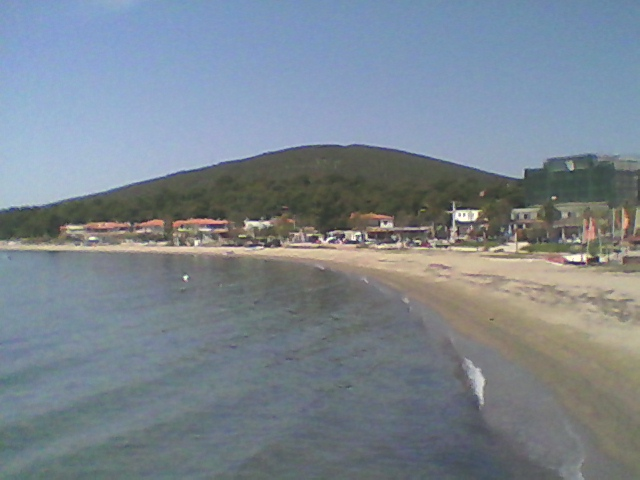

- Location within Greece
- Coordinates: 40°15′N 23°30′E
- Country: Greece
- Administrative region: Central Macedonia
- Regional unit: Chalkidiki
- Municipality: Polygyros
- Municipal unit: Ormylia
- Community: Ormylia
- Elevation: 5 m (16 ft)

Population (2021)
  - Total: 333
- Time zone: UTC+2 (EET)
  - Summer (DST): UTC+3 (EEST)
- Postal code: 630 71
- Area code: +30 23710
- Vehicle registration: ΧΚ
- Website: https://www.interalex.net/search?q=psakoudia

Psakoudia (Greek: Ψακούδια [psaˈku ðʝa] \psaˈkoodya\) is a village of Chalkidiki (Greek Χαλκιδική]) peninsula (formerly prefecture) in Central Macedonia, of Northern Greece. This settlement belongs to the Municipality of Polygyros, and in particular to the municipal unit of Ormylia. It covers the west part of the long sandy beach of Ormylia, and has a population of 333 inhabitants (2021).

== Location ==
Psakoudia is located on the gulf of Torone, between the two peninsulas of Kassandra and Sithonia, 20 km southeast of Polygyros, 5 km east of Yerakini (Gerakini), 6 km southwest of Ormylia and 84 km southeast of Thessaloniki. It is covered with pine trees.

== History ==
In ancient times, there was the city of Sermyli, or Sermyle, in the area, an ally of Athens, which was destroyed by Philip II of Macedon. As a seaport it was used in the past, like Yerakini, for small bulkers to freight raw magnesite of a small concession owned by Skalistiris in eastern Trikorfo mountain area.

== Economy ==
As Psakoudia is a part of Ormylia most of its residents come from there, who own the olive groves in the north and are involved in olive farming for green table olives and olive oil. However, the principal occupation of the residents is tourist services in the summer. The population is increased in the summer months from June to August by many vacationers, Greeks and foreigners, who come to enjoy the Blue Flag awarded beach with its clear and clean sea. On the beach there are many hotels and other accommodations and a big summer resort, taverns, bars, and supermarkets on the motorway.

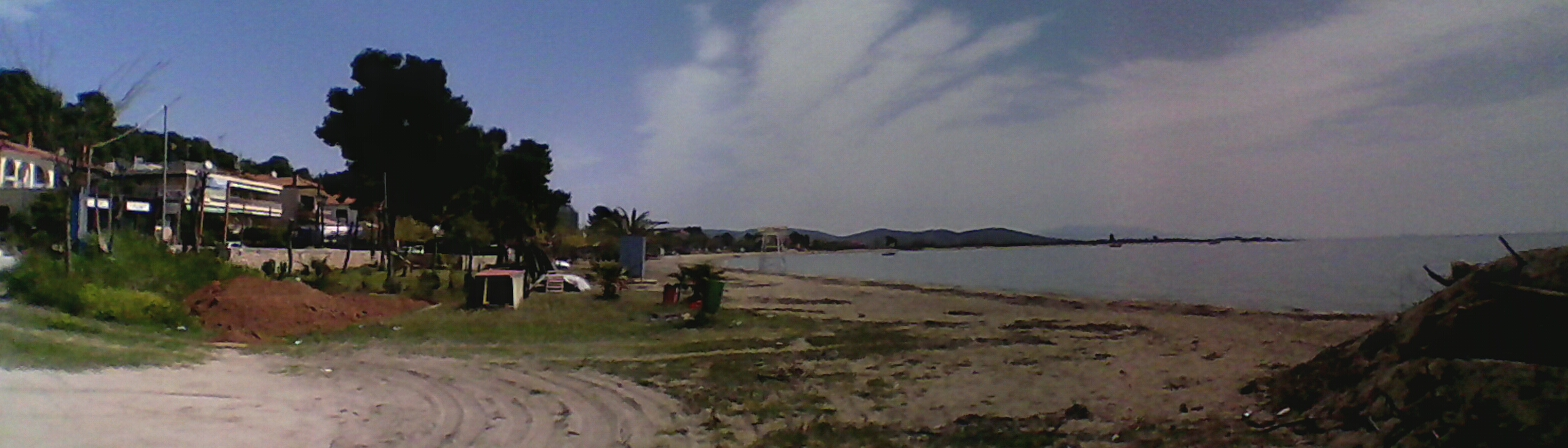
Psakoudia beach

Psakoudia main beach as seen from west

== Gallery ==
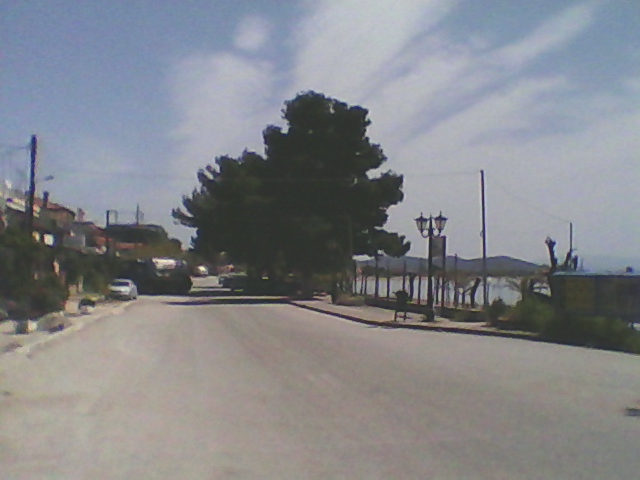
Seaside street

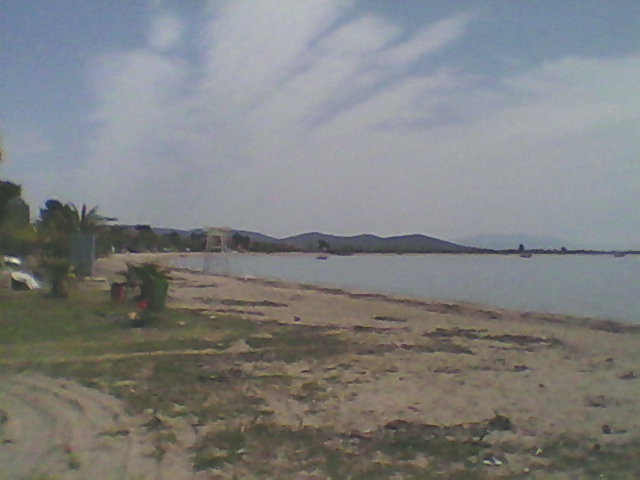
Main Beach

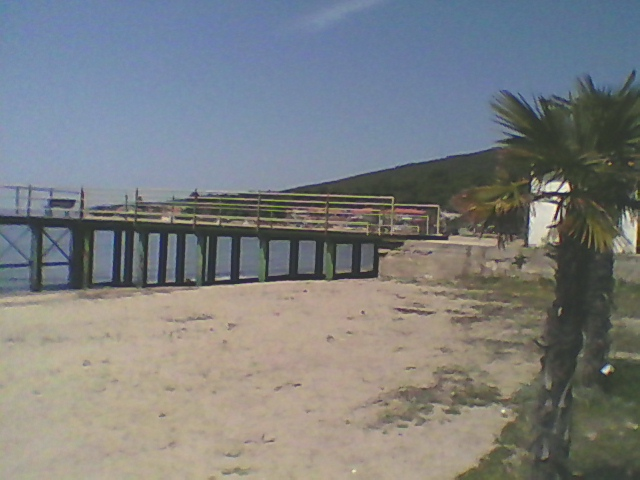
Recreation Dock

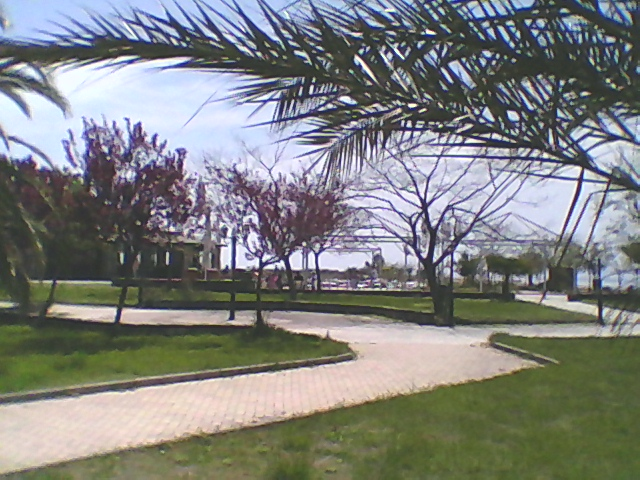
Recreation Park
