= Kalyves Polygyrou =

Kalyves Polygyrou Καλύβες
- Settlement
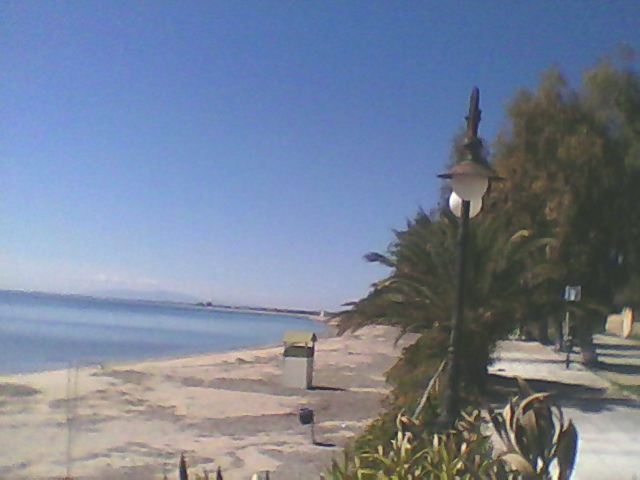
- Kalyves of Polygyros main beach

- Location within Greece
- Coordinates: 40°17′N 23°24′E
- Country: Greece
- Administrative region: Central Macedonia
- Regional unit: Chalkidiki
- Municipality: Polygyros
- Municipal unit: Polygyros
- Community: Polygyros
- Elevation: 10 m (33 ft)

Population (2021)
  - Total: 1,286
- Time zone: UTC+2 (EET)
  - Summer (DST): UTC+3 (EEST)
- Postal code: 631 00
- Area code: +30 23710
- Vehicle registration: ΧΚ
- Website: http://www.interalex.net/search?q=kalyves+polygyrou

Kalyves Polygyrou or Kalives, (Greek: Καλύβες, [kaˈlives]), old name Mecyberna, is a village in Chalkidiki peninsula in Central Macedonia of Northern Greece.

There is a kindergarten and primary school to accommodate pupils of both Kalyves and the nearby village of Yerakini. Patron Saint of the village is St. Modestus.

== Location ==
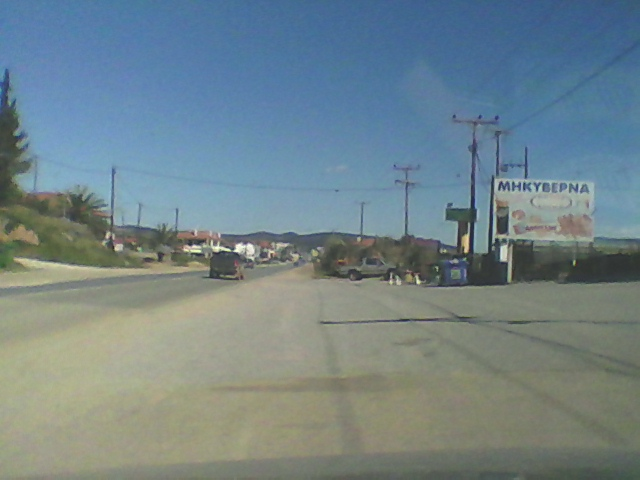
The Kalyves Polygyrou motorway dividing the village into two parts

Kalyves is located on the gulf of Torone, between the two fingers (smaller peninsulas) of Kassandra and Sithonia, 70 km southeast of Thessaloniki, 4.5 km west of Yerakini (Gerakini) and 6 km east of Olynthus. It belongs to the Municipality of Polygyros, the capital town of Chalkidiki.

== Etymology and history ==
Kalyves Polygyrou means “Huts of Polygyros” as the first inhabitants, farmers, who settled from Polygyros in the late 1800s and early 1900s, had small houses as homesteads for the cultivation of their land in the area, ever since belonging to its municipality administration (municipal unit).

In the past the area was also involved in sericulture (silk farming).

In ancient times it used to be an independent city and seaport of Olynthus.

== Economy ==
Olive farming is the main occupation of the residents, for green table olives and olive oil. In the north there is the Industrial area of Polygyros with a number of companies and the magnesite mines of Patelidas. The population is increased in the summer months June to August by many holidaymakers, mainly Greeks, most of whom have their summer homes there.

It has a long beach stretching from Mikyverna (Mecyberna) residences beach to Agios Mamas beach. On the beach one can find many hotels, taverns, bars and the remains of the old windmill “Molyvopyrgos” in the west.

A big summer resort started its operations on the beach near the windmill in the spring of 2015.
