= Fonis Zoglopitis =

Greek visual artist (1930–2015)

- Born: 1930; Thessaloniki, Greece
- Died: 24 April 2015 (aged 84–85); Thessaloniki, Greece
- Occupation: Painter

Fonis Zoglopitis (Greek: Φώνης Ζογλοπίτης; 1930–24 April 2015) was a Greek painter.

== Biography ==
Zoglopitis was born in 1930 in Thessaloniki. His father, who died when Zoglopitis was still a child, was from Rachoula, a village in Karditsa Region, while his mother was born in Polygyros. After his father’s death, he settled with the rest of the family in Polygyros, where he spent his childhood.

He was a self-taught painter, and at first he worked as a civil servant. His first group exhibition was organised at Kochlias Gallery in Thessaloniki in 1972. The following years Zoglopitis returned to his birthplace and moreover he resigned from his previous occupation in order to pursue a career as a professional painter.

Zoglopitis was a long-time partner and friend of scholar and gallerist Dinos Christianopoulos. He also presented his artworks in various group and solo exhibitions all over Greece. In 1999 a retrospective exhibition of his work was organised by the Municipality of Thessaloniki at Vafopouleion Cultural Center. Zoglopitis was a member of KKE, and also an active member of various cultural and social groups.

He died on 24 April 2015. His daughter, Amalia Zoglopitou, is also a painter.

== Legacy ==
As an artist, Zoglopitis was a proponent of Postimpressionism and Expressionism. He was mainly a landscape painter, although many of his works include human figures, and nudes. Zoglopitis’ paintings are held by the Municipal Art Gallery of Thessaloniki, the Society for Macedonian Studies, the Teloglion Fine Arts Foundation, and private collections.

== Bibliography ==
- Dοra Kominι-Dialeti (ed.), Λεξικό Ελλήνων καλλιτεχνών. Ζωγράφοι, γλύπτες, χαράκτες, 16ος - 20ός αιώνας, Vol. 1, Athens 1997, Melissa.
