= Magnesite in Greece =

Magnesium (Mg) is a chemical element, an alkaline earth metal, the eighth-most abundant element in the Earth's crust and the fourth-most common element on Earth. It is contained in magnesite, dolomite, brucite, carnallite, talc, and magnesium minerals. China is now the biggest producer of crude magnesite in the world for refractory and agricultural uses.

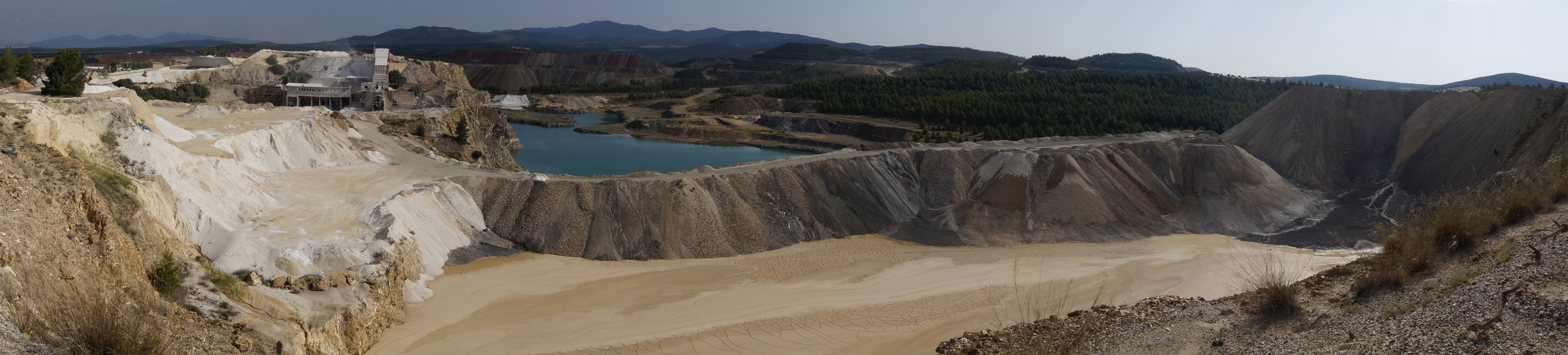
Magnesite quarries in Gerakini, Chalkidiki

Crude magnesite was produced in Greece in 1910. It was first found in Atalanti and in the Province of Lokris, central Greece.

Other localities were Perachori, near Corinth; Ermioni (or Kastri) and on Spetses Island in southern Argolis in the Peloponnese; on Paros Island (Cyclades); around Thebes in Boeotia and in Papades and Troupi in northern Euboea. Euboea was mostly worked until the 1980s.

Galataki (near Limni) and Afrati (near Chalcis) were exploited by the English company Petrified Ltd. (founded 1897 and based in London), which finally sold its assets to the Anglo-Greek Magnesite Company. Ltd (AGM) in 1902. Besides, northern Greece was found to have magnesite mining interest, in the concessions of Aghia Paraskevi (east of Thessaloniki) in small production, and in Chalkidiki’s concessions of Vavdos, Patelidas and Yerakini with the largest deposits.

== See also ==
- Uses of magnesite
