= Anthemountas =

Anthemountas Ανθεμούντας
- Municipal unit
- Location within the regional unit

- Location within Greece
- Coordinates: 40°28′N 23°17′E
- Country: Greece
- Administrative region: Central Macedonia
- Regional unit: Chalkidiki
- Municipality: Polygyros

Area
  - Municipal unit: 249.0 km^{2} (96.1 sq mi)

Population (2021)
  - Municipal unit: 3,808
  - Municipal unit density: 15.29/km^{2} (39.61/sq mi)
- Time zone: UTC+2 (EET)
  - Summer (DST): UTC+3 (EEST)
- Vehicle registration: ΧΚ

Anthemountas (Greek: Ανθεμούντας) is a former municipality in Chalkidiki, Greece. Since the 2011 local government reform it has been part of the municipality of Polygyros, of which it is a municipal unit. The municipal unit has an area of 248.956 km^{2}. It population in 2021 was 3,808. The seat of the municipality was in Galatista.
