= Folklore Museum of Polygyros =

- Λαογραφικό Μουσείο Πολύγυρου
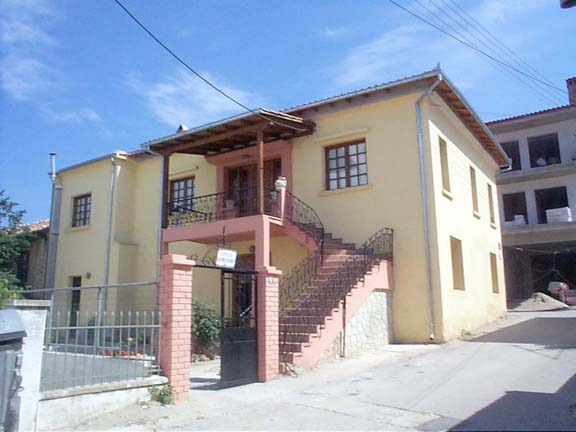
- Outside view
- Established: May 1998
- Location: Polygyros, Greece
- Coordinates: 40.378391012879064°N 23.442751471106867°E
- Type: Art museum
- Founder: Women's Voluntary Association for Community Development

The Folklore Museum of Polygyros is located in Polygyros, the capital city of Chalkidiki regional unit in Central Macedonia, Greece. It opened in May 1998 on the initiative of the Women's Voluntary Association for Community Development, a local group that has been organising folklore-related events for the past twenty years. The museum is located in the town centre in the renovated two-storey residence of the former mayor of Polygyros, Mr Karaganis, who donated it for the purpose.

== Exhibits ==
The exhibits have all been donated by residents and citizens of Polygyros. Those on the first floor are so arranged as to recreate the interior of an urban house of the nineteenth and early twentieth century, with reception rooms (a salon with sofas and a low round table, a dining room, and the rest of the furniture that an urban house in Macedonia was expected to have), bedrooms (with metal bedsteads, wardrobes, and bedding), the everyday sitting-room, the kitchen (complete with cooking utensils, cauldrons, baking trays, a fireplace), and another room containing the traditional loom. Authentic costumes from the wider area of Poliyiros are displayed in various corners of the house.

On the ground floor, visitors may admire agricultural implements used for ploughing, sowing, reaping, threshing, and the olive harvest, and more traditional costumes from the town and the countryside.

== Gallery ==
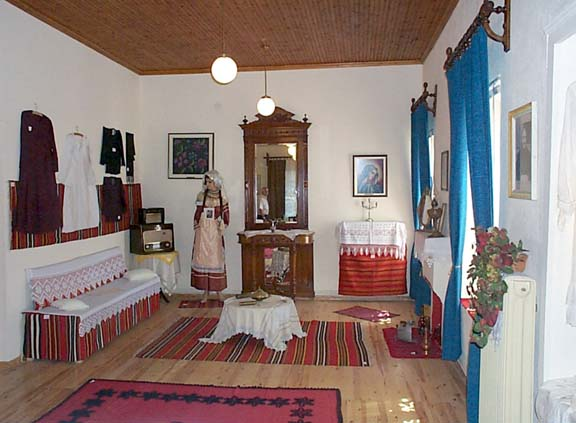
Interior view

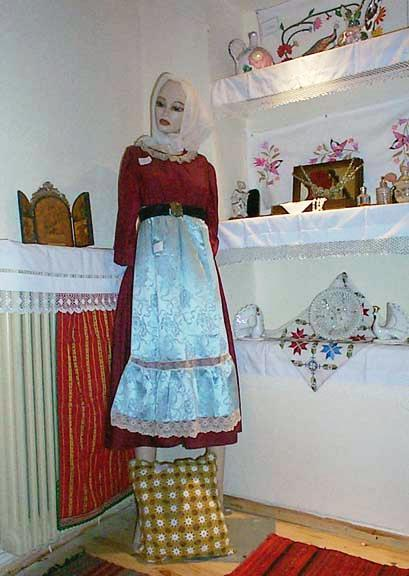
Traditional costume

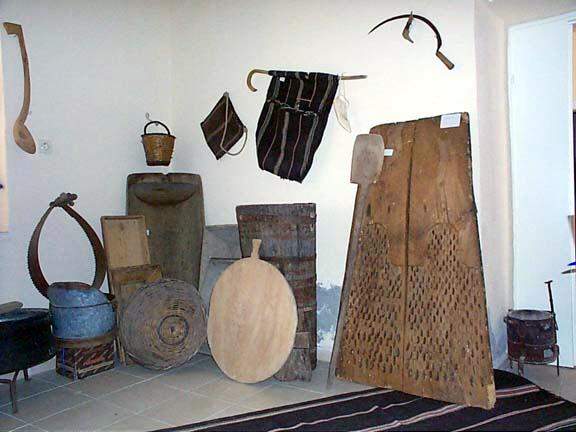
Agricultural implements

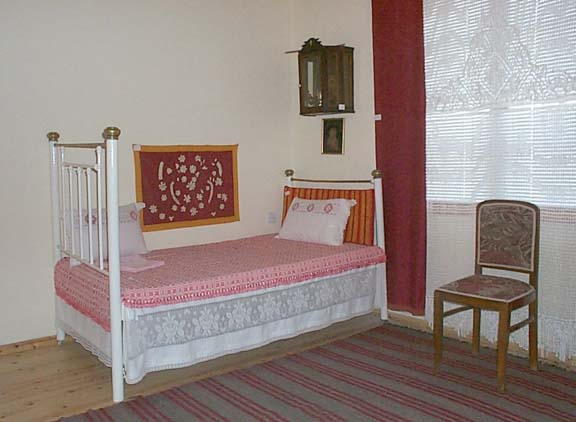
Bedroom
