= Taxiarchis, Chalkidiki =

Taxiarchis Ταξιάρχης
- Community
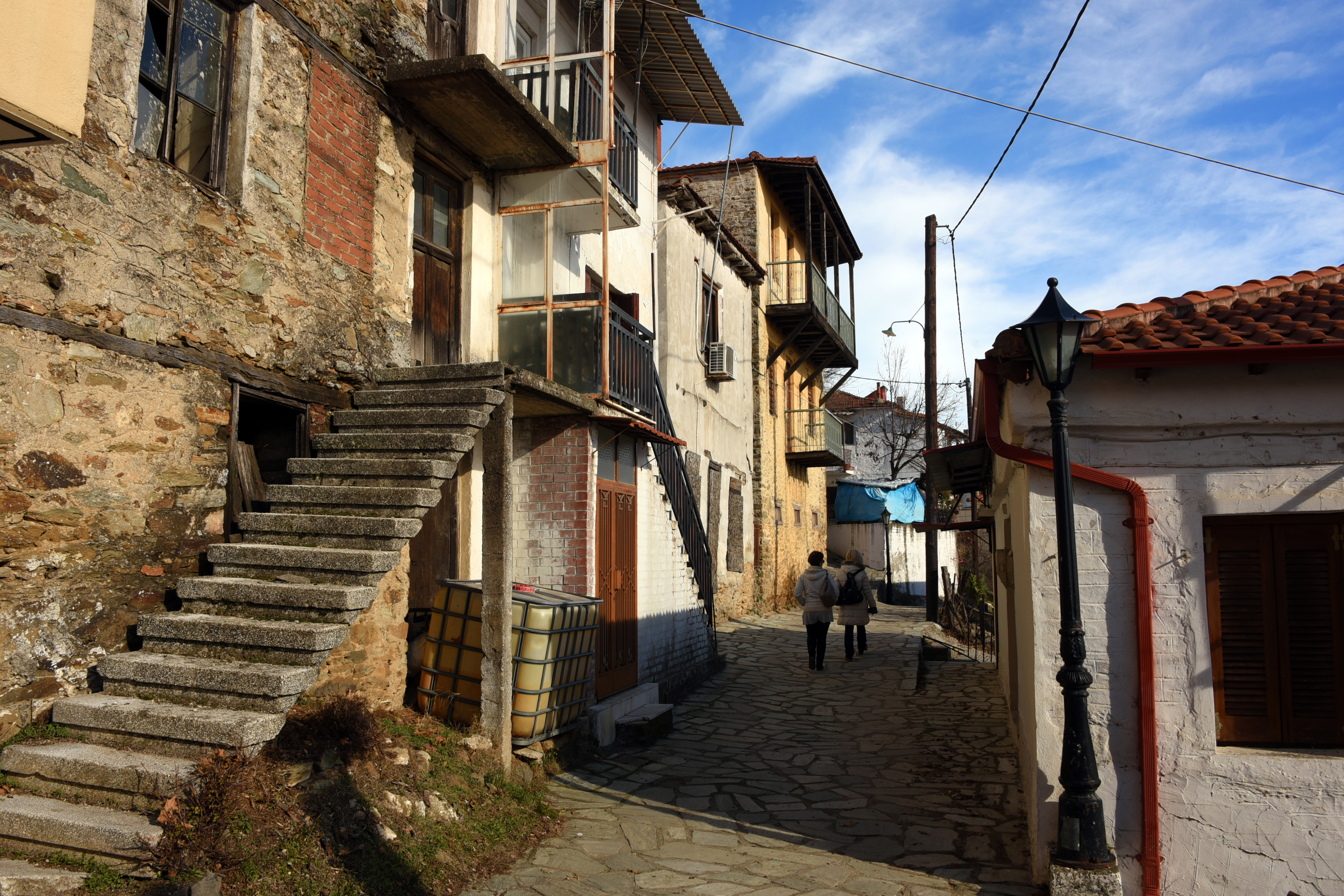
- Small street in Taxiarchis

- Location within Greece
- Coordinates: 40.424°N 23.523°E
- Country: Greece
- Administrative region: Central Macedonia
- Regional unit: Chalkidiki
- Municipality: Polygyros
- Municipal unit: Polygyros
- Elevation: 670 m (2,200 ft)

Population (2021)
  - Community: 742
- Time zone: UTC+2 (EET)
  - Summer (DST): UTC+3 (EEST)
- Postal code: 631 00
- Area code: 23710
- Vehicle registration: XK

Taxiárchis is a village located near Mount Holomontas in Polygyros, Chalkidiki, Central Macedonia, Greece. Locals are involved in the cultivation of firs for the Greek Christmas tree market. The chapel of Agia Paraskevi is located in the village.
