= Rentina Gorge =

Valley in Macedonia, Greece

Coordinates: 40.656°N 23.605°E

The Rentina Gorge (Greek: Στενά της Ρεντίνας) or Macedonian Tempe (Greek: Μακεδονικά Τέμπη) is a gorge in Rentina, Thessaloniki, Macedonia, Greece, named after Tempe (mod. pronunciation: "Tembi"), the long strip of gorges, hills and rivers in Thessaly.

The Rentina Gorge, located between Mount Cholomon and the Kerdylia mountains, lies just outside the major city of Thessaloniki and is a popular tourist spot during autumn, when the leaves change colour, and summer, when many people picnic there.
