= Greek National Road 17 =

Trunk road in Greece

Coordinates: 39.5833°N 20.8162°E

National Road 17
- Εθνική Οδός 17
- Route of the EO17 road, in blue

Route information
- Length: 17.5 km (10.9 mi)
- Existed: 9 July 1963–present

Major junctions
- North end: Ioannina
- South end: Dodoni

Location
- Country: Greece
- Regions: Epirus
- Primary destinations: Ioannina; Dodoni

Highway system
- Highways in Greece; Motorways; National roads
| ← EO16a | → EO19 |

Greek National Road 17 (Greek: Εθνική Οδός 17), abbreviated as the EO17, is a national road in northwestern Greece. It connects Ioannina with Dodoni and the nearby ancient site of Dodona, via Bizani.

== History ==
Ministerial Decision G25871 of 9 July 1963 created the EO17 from the old EO79, which existed by royal decree from 1955 until 1963, and followed the same route as the current EO17.
