= Greek National Road 16 =

Trunk road in Greece

Coordinates: 40.5052°N 23.4598°E

National Road 16
- Εθνική Οδός 16
- Route of the EO16 road, in blue
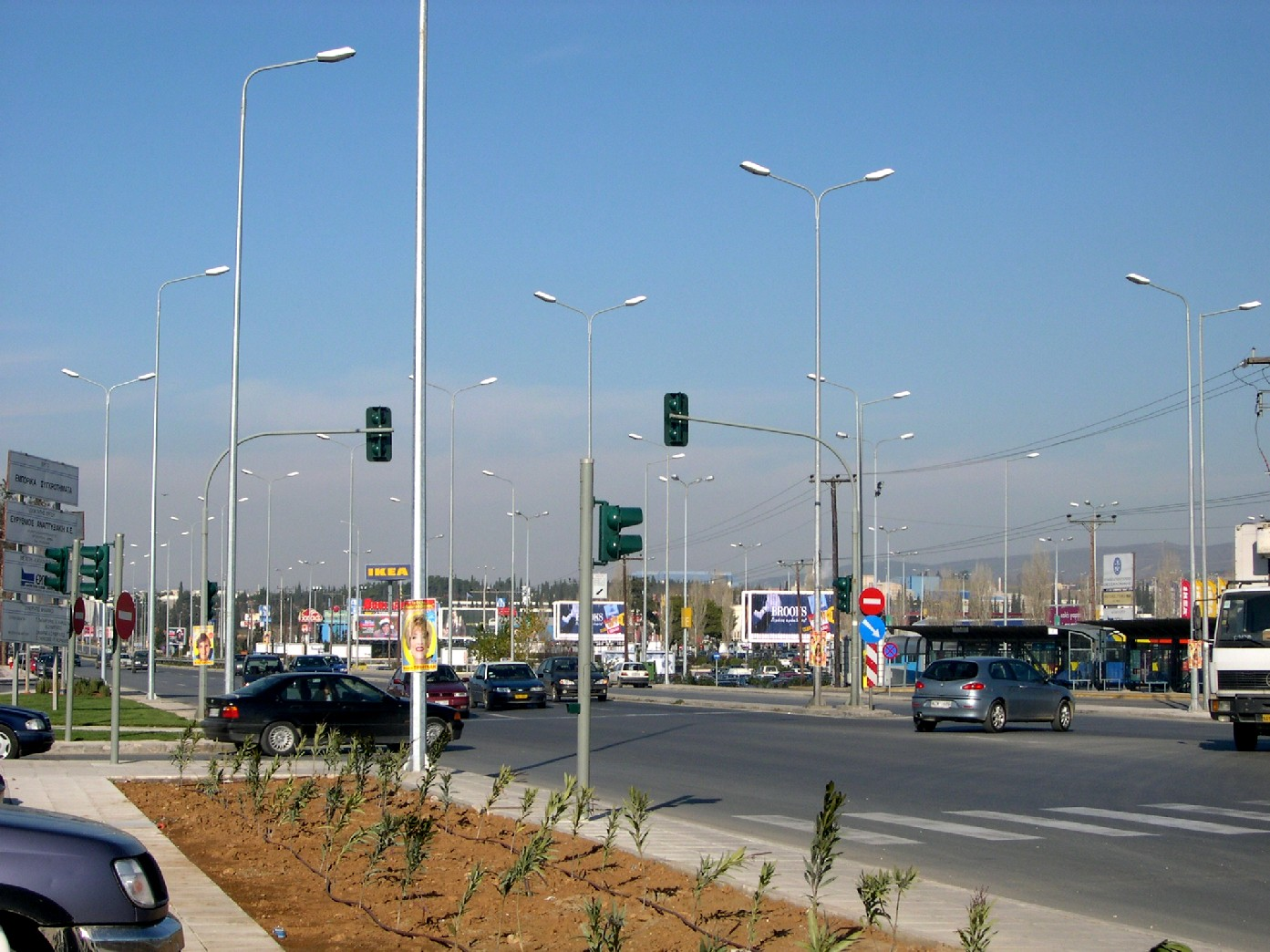
- Georgikis Scholis Avenue, on the EO16

Route information
- Length: 114.9 km (71.4 mi)
- Existed: 9 July 1963–present

Major junctions
- West end: Thessaloniki
- East end: Ierissos

Location
- Country: Greece
- Regions: Central Macedonia
- Primary destinations: Thessaloniki; Arnaia; Ierissos

Highway system
- Highways in Greece; Motorways; National roads
← EO15	→ EO16a

Greek National Road 16 (Greek: Εθνική Οδός 16), abbreviated as the EO16, is a national road in northern Greece. It connects Thessaloniki with Ierissos in Chalkidiki. At its beginning in Thessaloniki, it forms the Georgikis Scholis Highway, with three lanes in each direction, passing through one of the city's main commercial districts.

== Route ==
The EO16 is officially defined as an east–west road in the Thessaloniki and Chalkidiki regional units. It starts at Dimokratias Square in the city centre, where the EO1a, EO2 and the Nea Diagonios meet, and heads east towards Ierissos, passing through Thermi, Agios Prodromos and Arnaia. The EO16a and EO67 branches off the EO16 at Agios Prodromos and Thermi respectively.

== History ==
Ministerial Decision G25871 of 9 July 1963 created the EO16 from the main route of the old EO40, which existed by royal decree from 1955 until 1963, and included the same route as the current EO16: the Thessaloniki Airport branch of the old EO40 was given to the EO67, while the Polygyros branch was given to the EO16a.
