= Greek National Road 16a =

Trunk road in Greece

National Road 16a
- Εθνική Οδός 16α
- Route of the EO16a road, in blue

Route information
- Auxiliary route of EO16
- Length: 14.0 km (8.7 mi)
- Existed: 9 July 1963–present

Major junctions
- North end: Agios Prodromos
- South end: Polygyros

Location
- Country: Greece
- Regions: Central Macedonia
- Primary destinations: Agios Prodromos; Polygyros

Highway system
- Highways in Greece; Motorways; National roads
← EO16	→ EO17

Greek National Road 16a (Greek: Εθνική Οδός 16α), abbreviated as the EO16a, is a national road in Chalkidiki, Central Macedonia, Greece. It connects Polygyros with Greek National Road 16 near Agios Prodromos.

It functions as a short, but important branch, allowing direct access of Polygyros to the main road network to Thessaloniki and the rest of Chalkidiki.

== Route ==
The EO16a is officially defined as a branch of the EO16 in the Chalkidiki regional unit: the EO16a branches off the EO16 at Agios Prodromos, and heads 14.0 kilometres (8.7 miles) south to Polygyros. At Polygyros, the EO16a connects with Chalkidiki provincial roads 1, 5 and 8.

== History ==
Ministerial Decision G25871 of 9 July 1963 created the EO16a from the Polygyros branch of the old EO40, which existed by royal decree from 1955 until 1963: at the time of creation, the EO16a used to branch off the EO16 at Palaiokastro, instead of Agios Prodromos.
