= Mount Cholomon =

Mountain in Greece

Cholomondas
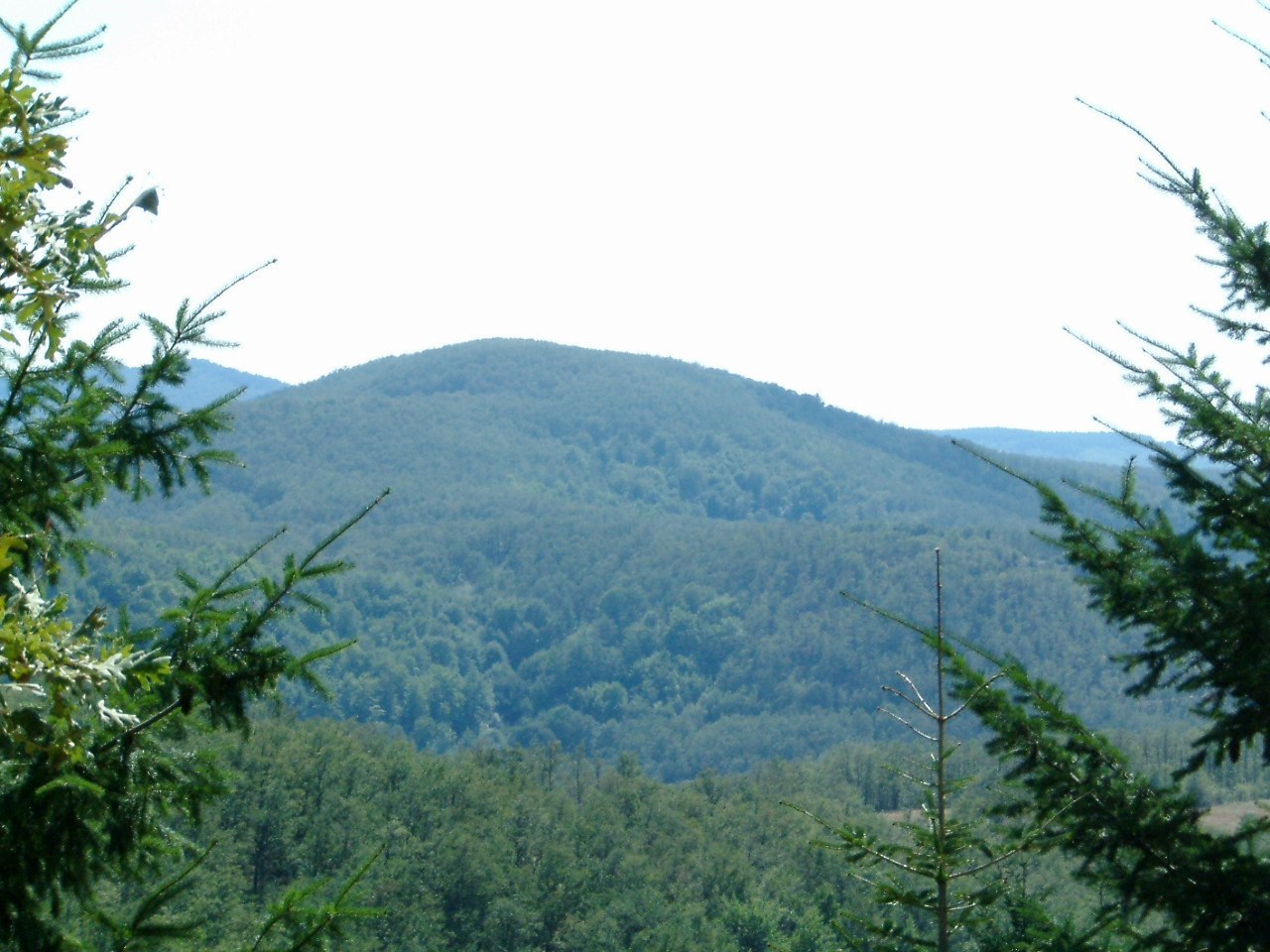
- Mount Cholomondas with its dense forest

Highest point
- Elevation: 1,165 m (3,822 ft)
- Coordinates: 40°27′34″N 23°31′13″E

Geography
- Location within Greece
- Location: Chalkidiki, Greece

Cholomon or Cholomondas (Greek: Χολομών, Χολομώντας, sometimes transliterated as Holomontas) is a mountain in Central Macedonia, Greece, that covers almost all of central and east Chalkidiki. The ancient Greeks called the mountain Ypsison. It is covered by dense oak forest and is part of the Natura 2000 network. The highest peak rises northeast of Polygyros, which is the capital of Chalkidiki, to 1.165 metres and is the highest point of Chalkidiki.

== See also ==
- Rentina Gorge
