= Zervochoria =

Zervochoria Ζερβοχώρια
- Municipal unit
- Location within the regional unit

- Location within Greece
- Coordinates: 40°30′N 23°27′E
- Country: Greece
- Administrative region: Central Macedonia
- Regional unit: Chalkidiki
- Municipality: Polygyros

Area
  - Municipal unit: 139.5 km^{2} (53.9 sq mi)

Population (2021)
  - Municipal unit: 1,934
  - Municipal unit density: 13.86/km^{2} (35.91/sq mi)
- Time zone: UTC+2 (EET)
  - Summer (DST): UTC+3 (EEST)
- Vehicle registration: ΧΚ

Zervochoria (Greek: Ζερβοχώρια) is a former municipality in Chalkidiki, Greece. Since the 2011 local government reform it is part of the municipality Polygyros, of which it is a municipal unit. The municipal unit has an area of 139.526 km^{2}. Population 1,934 (2021). The seat of the municipality was in Palaiochora.
