= Ormylia =

Town in Chalkidiki, Greece

Ormylia Ορμύλια
- Municipal unit
- Location within the regional unit

- Location within Greece
- Coordinates: 40°18′N 23°33′E
- Country: Greece
- Administrative region: Central Macedonia
- Regional unit: Chalkidiki
- Municipality: Polygyros

Area
  - Municipal unit: 88.0 km^{2} (34.0 sq mi)
- Elevation: 34 m (112 ft)

Population (2021)
  - Municipal unit: 4,227
  - Municipal unit density: 48.0/km^{2} (124/sq mi)
  - Community: 3,621
- Time zone: UTC+2 (EET)
  - Summer (DST): UTC+3 (EEST)
- Postal code: 631 00
- Area code: 23710
- Vehicle registration: ΧΚ

Ormylia (Greek: Ορμύλια) is a town and a former municipality in Chalkidiki, Greece. Since the 2011 local government reform it is part of the municipality Polygyros, of which it is a municipal unit. The municipal unit has an area of 88.002 km^{2}. In 2021 Ormylia had a population of 4,227.

== Institutions ==
The Ormylia Foundation: Founded by Archimandrite Aimilianos established to make a contribution for the benefit of mankind and culture in the tradition of Orthodox Monasticism. In February 2006, the Greek state, recognizing the social and scientific contribution of this monastic foundation, passed a special law approving its establishment as a public welfare institution under the name 'Ormylia Foundation' with the title 'Panagia Philanthropini Center'. The Foundation is a legal entity of private law and comes under the jurisdiction and supervision of the Minister of Economy and Finance, the Minister of Development, the Minister of Health and Social Solidarity and the Minister of Culture. It is governed by the provisions of its establishment act."

Panagia Philanthropini Center: "Center for Social Advancement, Disease Prevention and Medical Research, 'Panagia Philanthropini' was founded in 1982, eight years after the foundation of the Orthodox Christian Convent of the Annunciation of the Blessed Virgin Mary, in Ormylia, Chalkidike, northern Greece.... The mission of the Center is to comfort and alleviate the suffering of human beings without preference to race, religion, gender, or creed.... the Center provides high quality standardized cancer tests for the underserved."
