= Polygyros =

Town in Chalkidiki, Greece

Polygyros Πολύγυρος
- Municipality
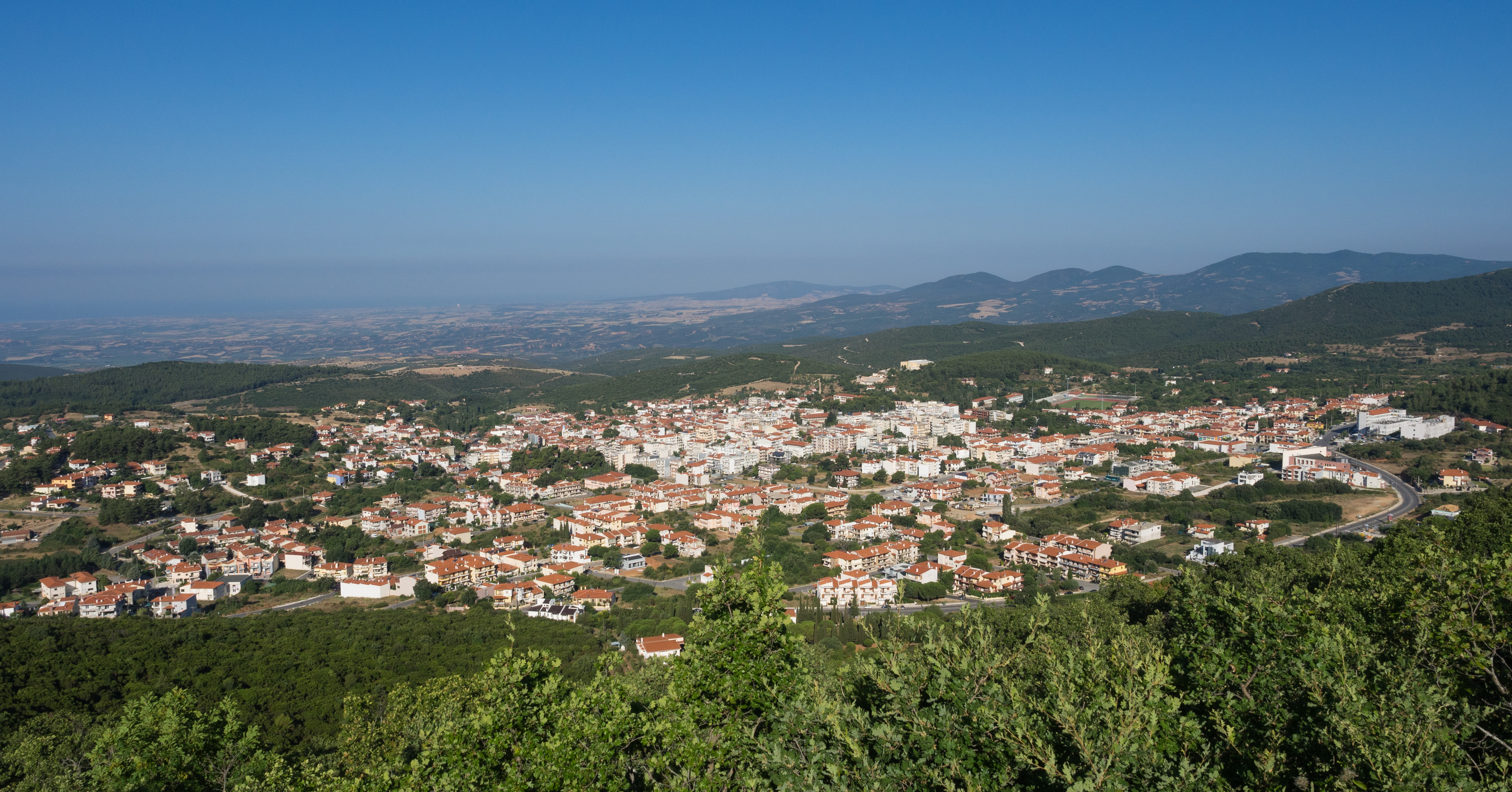
- Polygyros from the east

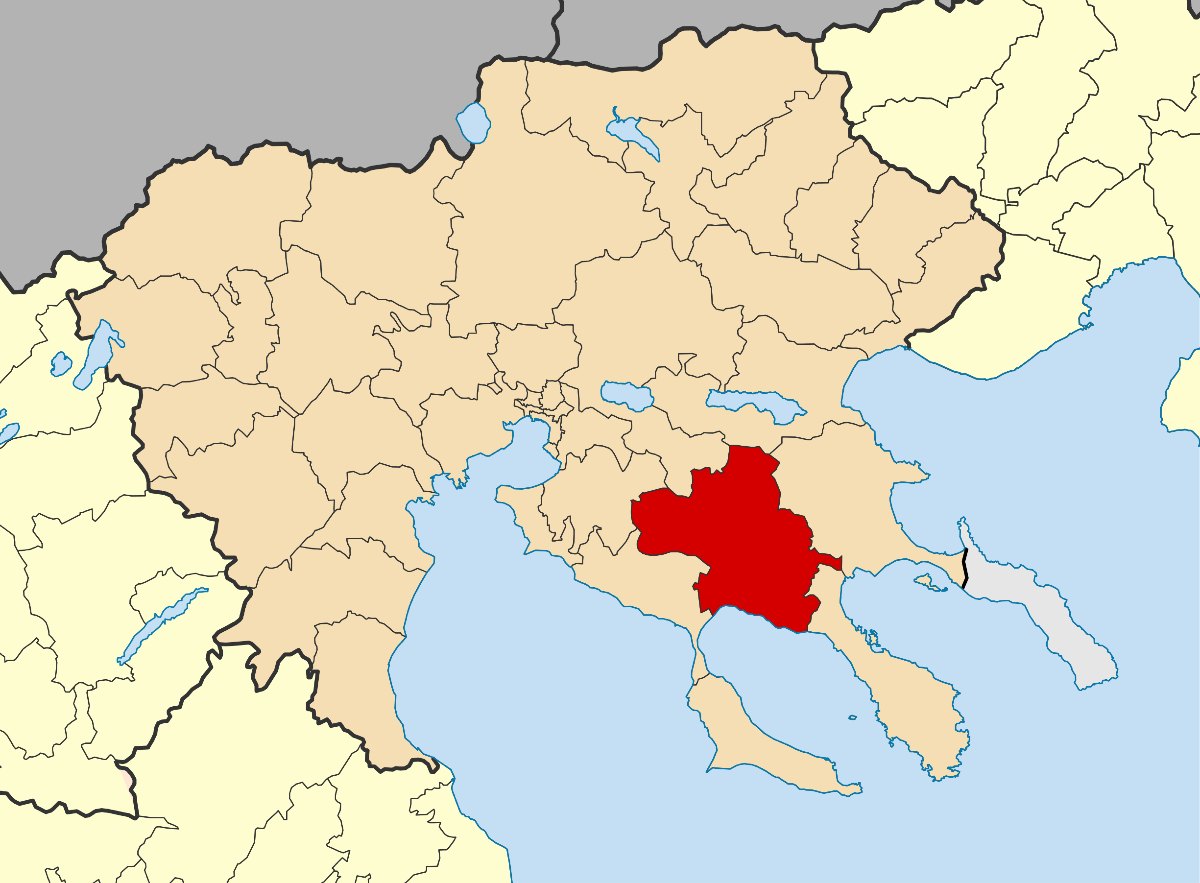

- Location within Greece
- Coordinates: 40°22′N 23°26′E
- Country: Greece
- Administrative region: Central Macedonia
- Regional unit: Chalkidiki

Government
  - Mayor: Georgios Emmanouil (since 2023)

Area
  - Municipality: 947.4 km^{2} (365.8 sq mi)
  - Municipal unit: 470.9 km^{2} (181.8 sq mi)
- Elevation: 560 m (1,840 ft)

Population (2021)
  - Municipality: 21,351
  - Density: 22.54/km^{2} (58.37/sq mi)
  - Municipal unit: 11,382
  - Municipal unit density: 24.17/km^{2} (62.60/sq mi)
  - Community: 7,779
- Time zone: UTC+2 (EET)
  - Summer (DST): UTC+3 (EEST)
- Postal code: 631 00
- Area code: 23710
- Vehicle registration: ΧΚ
- Website: polygyros.gr

Polygyros (Greek: Πολύγυρος) is a town and municipality in Central Macedonia, Greece. It is the capital of Chalkidiki.

== Geography ==
Polygyros town (pop. 7,779 at the 2021 census) is built in the shape of an amphitheatre on a plateau on the south west side of the mountain Cholomontas. It is at the southern end of the EO16a road, which leads to the EO16 (Thessaloniki–Arnaia) at Agios Prodromos. Polygyros is located SE of Thessaloniki, NE of Nea Moudania, NW of Sithonia and SW of Arnaia. The municipal unit (the municipality before 2011) has a population of 11,386 inhabitants (2021) and a land area of 470.933 km^{2}. Other large communities in the municipal unit are Ólynthos (pop. 1,053), Taxiárchis (742), and Vrástama (944).

=== Climate ===
Polygyros has a hot-summer Mediterranean climate (Köppen: Csa), closely bordering on a humid subtropical climate (Köppen: Cfa) with relatively cold winters and relatively hot summers due to its elevation.

Climate data for Polygyros town (580m)
Month	Jan	Feb	Mar	Apr	May	Jun	Jul	Aug	Sep	Oct	Nov	Dec	Year
Mean daily maximum °C (°F)	7.3 (45.1)	10 (50)	13 (55)	15 (59)	21.2 (70.2)	25.8 (78.4)	27.7 (81.9)	29.1 (84.4)	25 (77)	20.9 (69.6)	14.4 (57.9)	10.1 (50.2)	18.3 (64.9)
Mean daily minimum °C (°F)	1.8 (35.2)	3.5 (38.3)	6.5 (43.7)	8.2 (46.8)	13.1 (55.6)	17.9 (64.2)	20.2 (68.4)	21.1 (70.0)	17.8 (64.0)	13.9 (57.0)	9.6 (49.3)	6 (43)	11.6 (53.0)
Average precipitation mm (inches)	49.7 (1.96)	21.1 (0.83)	52.9 (2.08)	72.4 (2.85)	33.7 (1.33)	77.3 (3.04)	44.2 (1.74)	13.8 (0.54)	33 (1.3)	35.7 (1.41)	74.5 (2.93)	96.5 (3.80)	604.8 (23.81)
Source: http://penteli.meteo.gr/stations/polygyros/ (2019 - 2020 averages)

== Name ==
There are different speculations about the origin of Polygyros' name. Some claim that it comes from the combination of poly (much) and geros (strong), because of the healthy climate. Others believe that the words poly and ieros (sacred) have given the present name, because of an ancient temple in the area. Also an old landowner, named Polyaros, offers a possible etymology. A further potential source could be from poly and gyros, referring to the residents' dietary habits. According to another possible etymology, the name derives from poly and gyros (round), possible due to the town's amphitheatric position.

== Municipality ==
The municipality Polygyros was formed at the 2011 local government reform by the merger of the following 4 former municipalities, that became municipal units:

- Anthemountas
- Ormylia
- Polygyros
- Zervochoria

The municipality has an area of 947.417 km^{2}, the municipal unit 470.933 km^{2}. The municipality includes the villages of Vrastama, Taxiarchis, Ormylia, Olynthos, Gerakini and Kalives.

== History ==
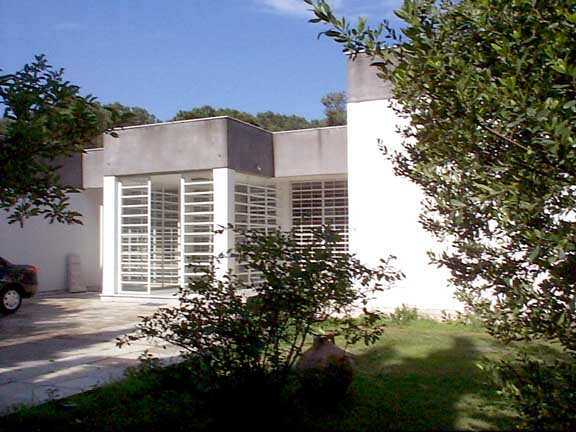
Archaeological Museum of Polygyros

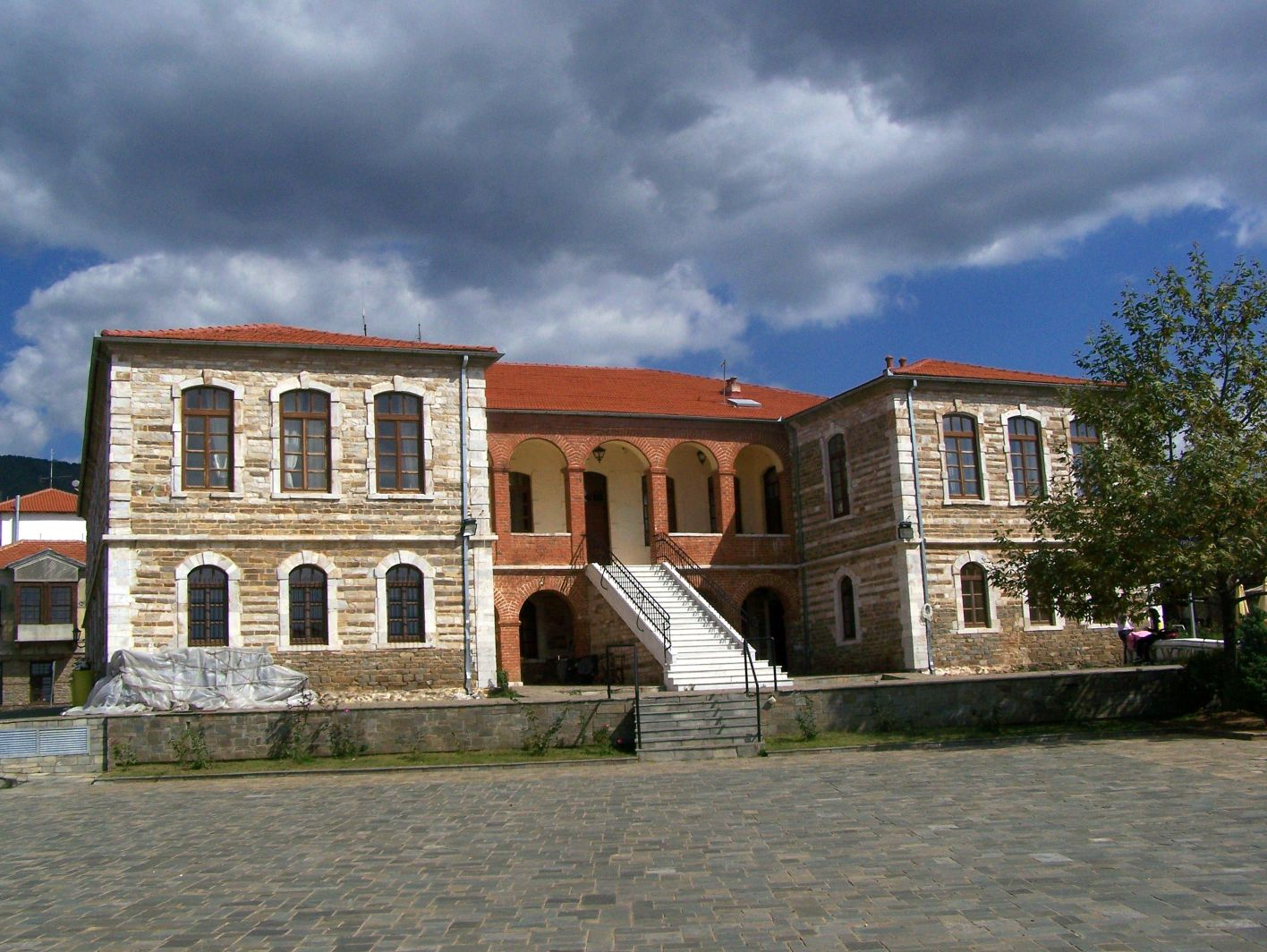
Polygyros town hall

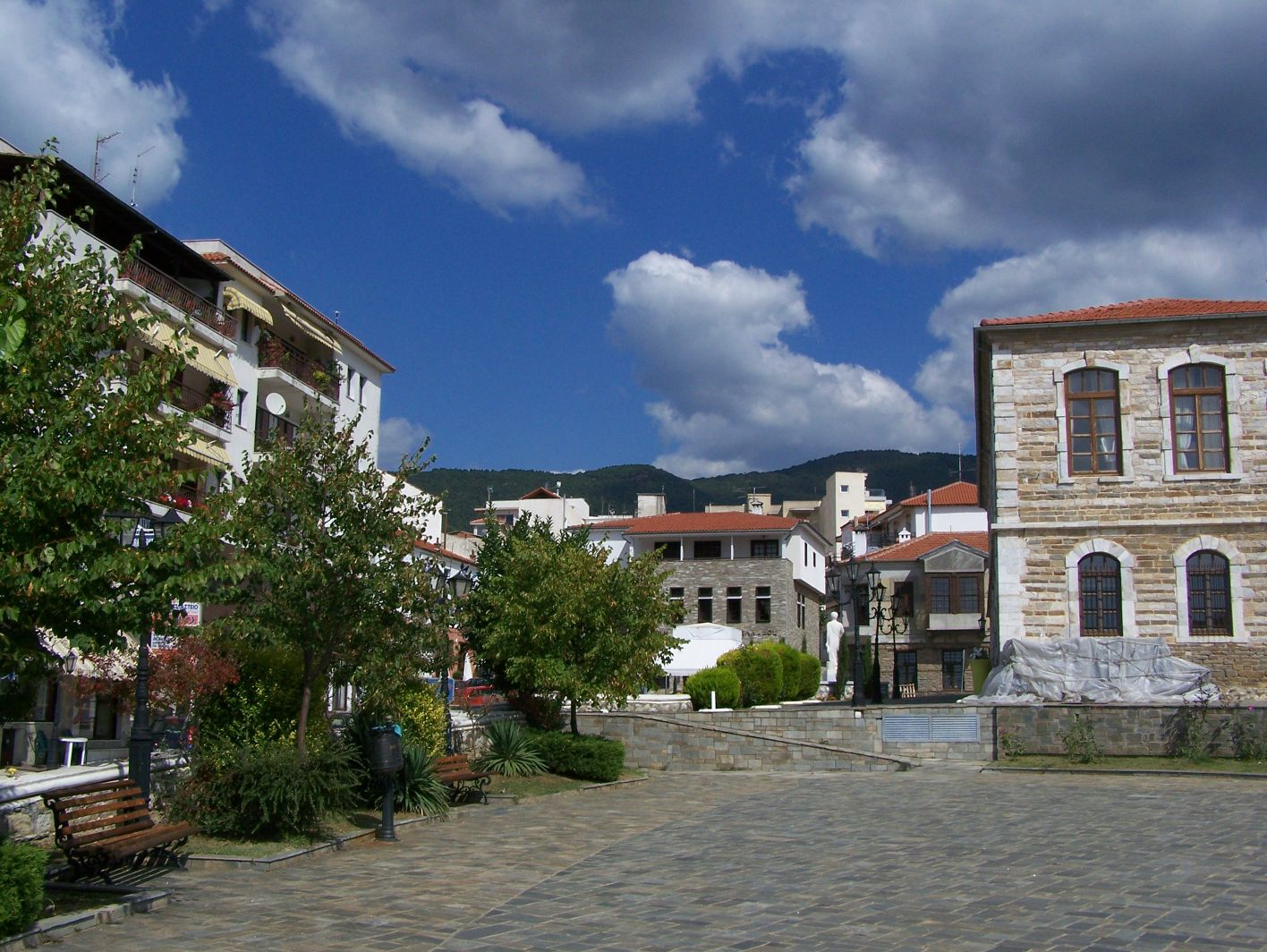
View of a square

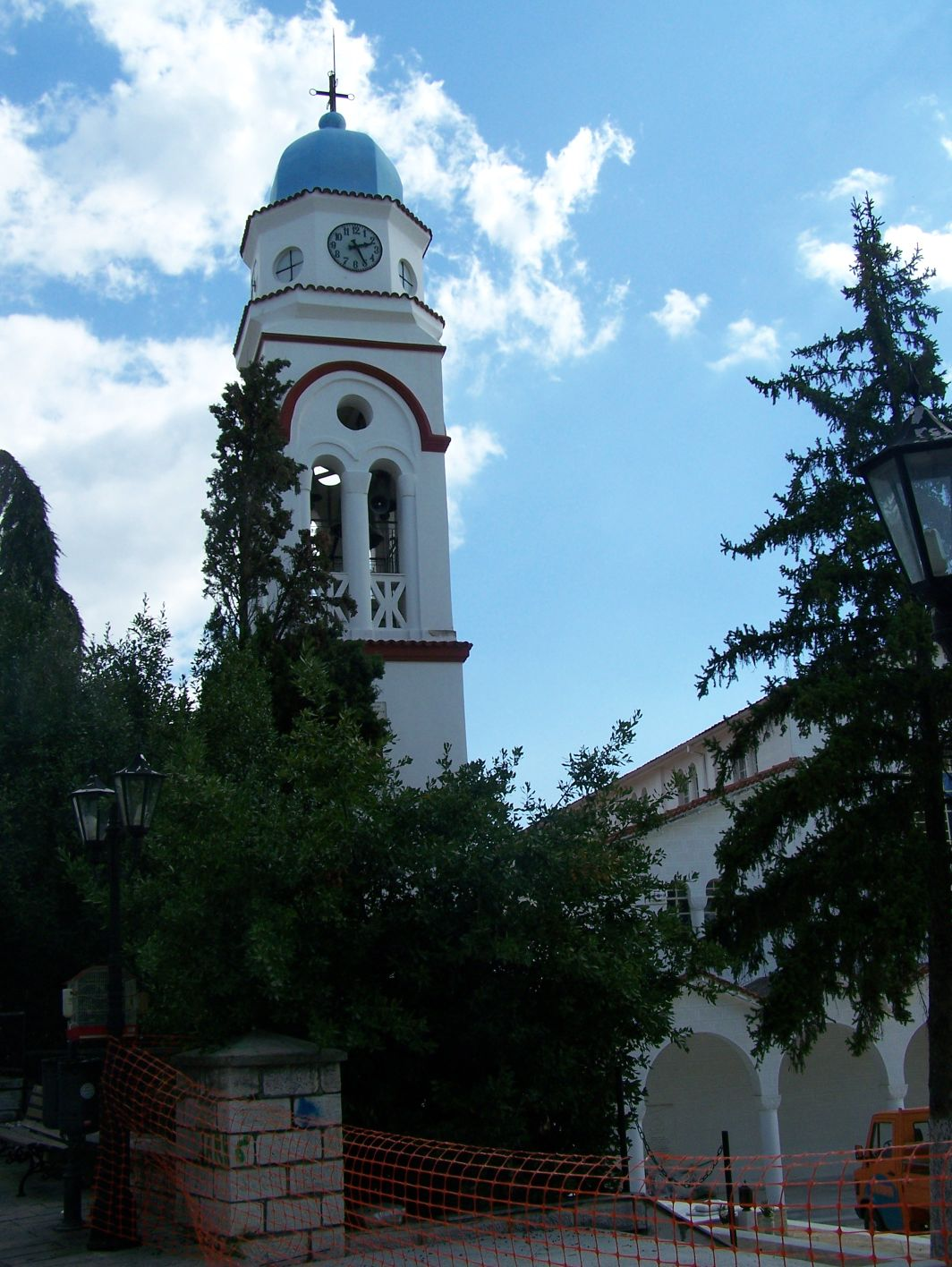
Saint Nicholas church in Polygyros

=== Antiquity ===
Some situate in the broader area of modern Polygyros the ancient city of Apollonia. Apollonia was one of the 32 cities, which, under the leadership of the Olynthus, constituted the Koinon ton Chalkideon (Chalkidian League). The Koinon was destroyed in 379 BCE by the Spartans, while in 348 BCE Philipp II of Macedon annexed the whole Chalcidice into the Macedonian Kingdom. In 168 BCE Chalcidice was subjected by the Romans.

=== Byzantine and Ottoman Era ===
The town of Polygyros is first mentioned in a medieval imperial document, chryssovoulon (with golden stamp), of Eastern Roman Emperor Nikephoros III Botaneiates about 1080 CE. In 1430, as the rest of the Eastern Roman Empire, Polygyros was conquered by the Ottomans and belonged to the Sanjak of Thessaloniki. On 17 May 1821 the people of Polygyros rose against the Ottoman authority and managed, temporarily, to expel the Ottoman guard. Polygyros, such as other villages of the peninsula, were burned by the Ottomans.

Many residents of Polygyros also took part in the 1854's unsuccessful revolutionary movement against the Ottomans.

=== Modern Era ===
Finally, on November 2, 1912 the Greek army, as one of the victors of the First Balkan War, entered Polygyros and incorporated the town in the Greek State.

== Culture ==
Polygyros is famous for its carnival celebrations, which attracts visitors from all over Greece. A nearby location called Panagia (Virgin Mary) is the setting of a famous religious celebration on August 15. Also, cultural societies are active in the fields of folk music and dance. Classic and modern music is cultivated in the municipal conservatory. There is a Folklore Museum in the town, opened in 1998.

=== Sports ===
Niki (victory) is the name of Polygyros' football club, which participates in the Chalkidiki FCA First Division. AOP (Athletic Club of Polygyros) is the local basketball team, participant in the Third National Basketball Division.

== Archaeological museum ==
The Archaeological Museum of Polygyros has exhibits containing findings from all over Chalkidiki and referring to Paleolithic and Neolithic age, geometric, archaic, classic, hellenistic and Roman period.

== Historical population ==
Year	Community	Municipal unit	Municipality
1981	5,239	-	-
1991	4,501	10,218	-
2001	6,227	10,444	-
2011	7,459	11,386	22,048
2021	7,779	11,382	21,351

== People ==
- Margaritis Schinas, politician.
- Christos Zabounis, editor.
- Fonis Zoglopitis (1930–2015), painter.

== See also ==
- List of settlements in Chalkidiki
