= Anthropological Museum of Petralona =

- Ανθρωπολογικό Μουσείο Πετραλώνων
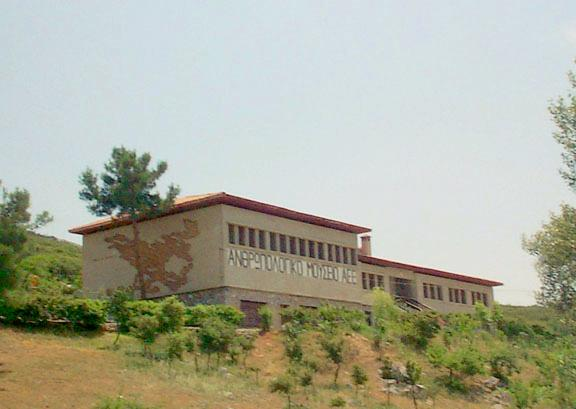
- View from outside
- Established: 1978
- Location: Petralona, Chalkidiki
- Coordinates: 40°22′22″N 23°10′04″E
- Type: Anthropological Museum
- Collections: 370 showcases in 10 units
- Founders: Aris Poulianos, founder of Anthropological Society of Greece
- Executive directors: Ephorate of Palaeoanthropology & Speleology - Northern Greece

The Anthropological Museum of Petralona was thirty-five kilometres from Thessaloniki, in Central Macedonia, Greece. It displayed finds from the nearby Petralona cave, in which the oldest European hominid skull was found.

The village of Petralona, Chalkidiki is about 10.5 kilometres (6.5 miles) north east of the A24 expressway. The cave and the anthropological museum are a further 2 km beyond the village. The museum was built and financed in 1978 by the Anthropological Society of Greece (AEE), which owns it. It opened in 1979. The purpose of the museum was to showcase the finds from the Petralona cave, the prehistoric culture of Greece, and finds representing the entire palaeoanthropological area of Greece.

The finds include replicas of the mausoleum of Archanthropus europeus petralonsiensis, the oldest traces of fire ever found (from the 24th geological stratum in the Petralona cave, which is more than one million years old), the earliest stone and bone tools, which were found at Nea Triglia in Chalkidiki (11 million years old), and finds from open spaces before the cave-dwelling era in Nea Triglia, the island of Euboea, Ptolemaida, the Aegean, other parts of Greece, and Africa.

There are also murals by the folk painter Christos Kagaras illustrating the emergence of life on Earth and Archanthropus teaching his children how to make tools of stone and bone, the evolution of life according to Aristotle, and the evolution of human life over the last 11 million years according to Poulianos.

The museum had a conference room, geological and palaeoanthropological conservation workshops, and a library.

In 2011 the museum was taken over by the Greek Archeological Service, a government agency. With the end of 2018 the cave and museum were closed. Currently a reopening seems unlikely.

== Gallery ==
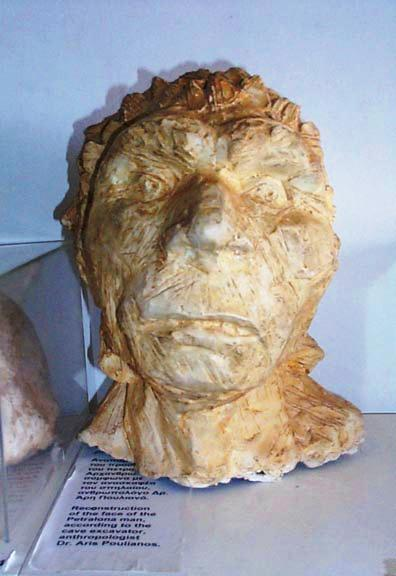
Reconstruction of an Archanthropus skull

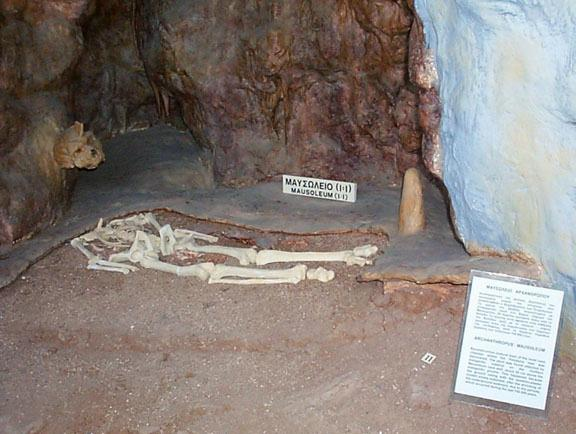
Reconstruction of a mausoleum with an Archanthropus skeleton

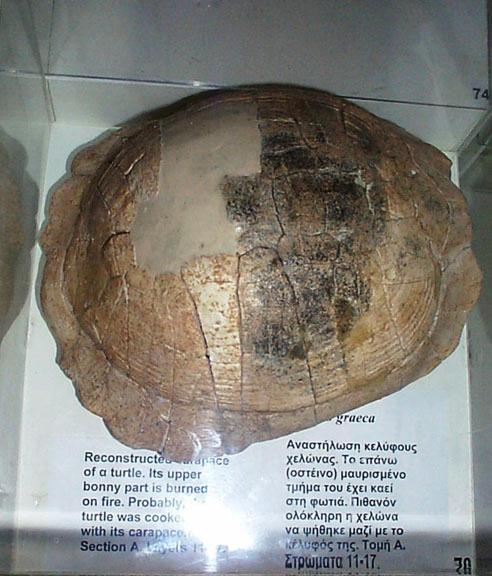
Fossilised tortoise of the Mesozoic era (65 million years old)

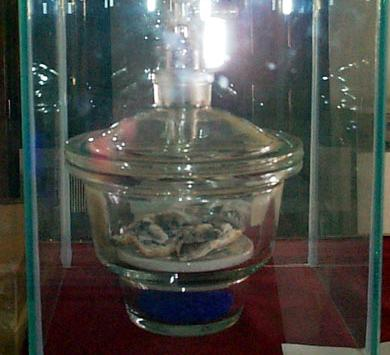
Traces of fire

== Attribution ==
- This article incorporates text from the corresponding article at the Museums of Macedonia website, commissioned by the Macedonian Heritage foundation, written by Vlasis Vlasidis, and published under a CC-BY-SA-3.0 license.
