= Aris Poulianos =

Greek anthropologist and archaeologist (1924–2021)

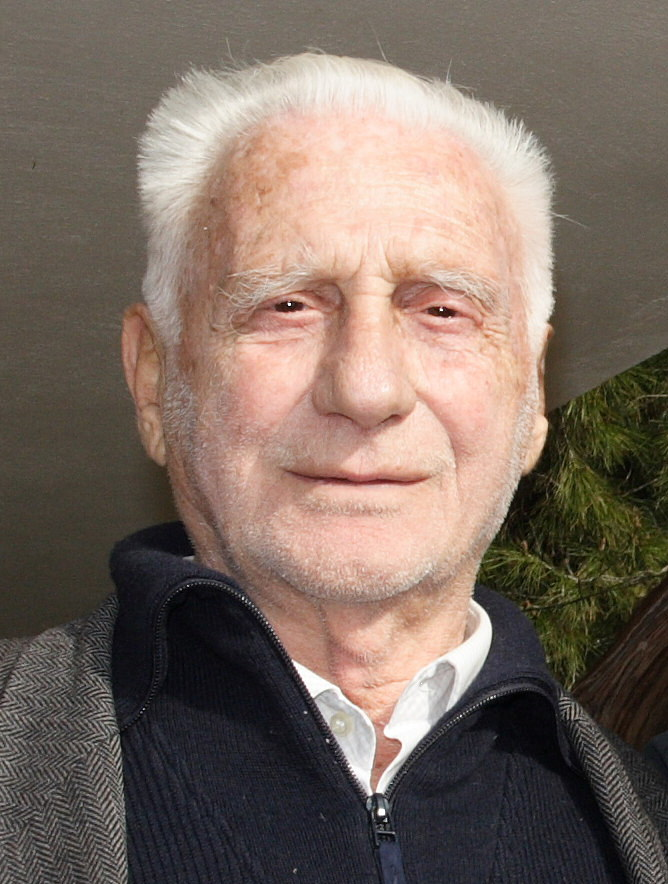
- Born: 24 July 1924; Ikaria, Greece
- Died: 21 March 2021 (aged 96)
- Education: Moscow State University
- Occupations: Anthropologist and archaeologist

Aris Poulianos (Greek: Άρης Πουλιανός; 24 July 1924 – 21 March 2021) was a Greek anthropologist and archaeologist.

== Early life and career ==
Aris Poulianos was born on 24 July 1924. Before becoming an anthropologist, Poulianos fought during World War II as a member of ELAS in 1942 and 1943. During the Greek Civil War, he fought on the side of the DSE in 1948 and 1949. After the war, Poulianos studied biology at Queens College, New York and then anthropology in Moscow.

Poulianos earned his Ph.D. at the Moscow State University under the supervision of anthropologist F. G. Debets in 1961 with a dissertation on The Origin of the Greeks, a work based on anthropometric studies of a sample of present-day Greek people. In 1965, he returned to Greece as a researcher. In 1971, Poulianos founded the Anthropological Association of Greece, which is now run by his son, Nikos. This organization has had a long-standing dispute with the Greek Ministry of Culture, after the latter's attempts to evict the association from the excavation site in the Petralona Cave, which was conceded to them after a 1981 contract. In 1976, Poulianos founded the Department of Paleoanthropology-Spelaeology, which functions within the Greek Ministry of Culture.

== Petralona skull ==
From the 1970s, Poulianos investigated early hominid remains found in a cave near Petralona, Greece, and became known for controversial claims over their age. According to Poulianos, the Petralona Cave was accidentally discovered in 1959 by local villagers searching for a spring in the mountainside. The Petralona skull, specifically, was discovered in 1960 when it was removed from a rock in the cave. Early estimates at the time placed the age of the hominid remains to around 70,000 years old. Poulianos would ultimately study the remains, name the hominid Archanthropus europeaus petraloniensis, and estimate its age to be around 700,000 years old.

During the 1980s, the age of the Petralona hominid estimated by Poulianos was challenged by an article in Nature. The scientists involved used electron spin resonance measurements and dated the age of the skull to between 160,000 and 240,000 years old. However, Poulianos states that his excavations in the cave since 1968 provide evidence of human occupation from the Pleistocene era. The Petralona hominid, specifically, was located in a stratigraphic layer containing the most tools and traces of habitation. Poulianos states that the age of the overall layer is approximately 670,000 years old, based on electron spin resonance measurements. Further excavations at Petralona revealed two human skeletons that were dated to be 800,000 years old.

Today, most academics who have analyzed the Petralona remains classify the hominid as Homo erectus. However, the Archanthropus of Petralona has also been classified as a Neanderthal (Homo neanderthalensis) and as an early generic class of Homo sapiens. Some authors, on the other hand, believe that the Petralona cranium is derived from a unique class of hominids different from Homo erectus. Runnels and van Andel summarise the situation as such : "The only known hominid fossil in Greece that may be relevant is the Petralona hominid, found by chance in 1960 in a deep cavern in the Chalkidiki. Controversy surrounds the interpretation of this cranium, and it has been variously classified as Homo erectus, as a classic Neanderthal (Homo sapiens neanderthalensis), and as an early representative of Homo sapiens in a generalized sense (Day 1986: 91-95). The consensus among paleoanthropologists today is that the cranium belongs to an archaic hominid distinguished from Homo erectus, and from both the classic Neanderthals and anatomically modern humans (Day 1986: 95; Stringer, Howell, and Melenitis 1979). Whatever the final classification may be, the cranium has been provisionally dated to ca. 200-400 kyr (Day 1986: 94 Hennig et al. 1981, 1982; Wintle and Jacobs 1982), and it is thus possible that the Petralona hominid represents the lineage responsible for the Thessalian Lower Paleolithic sites."

== Homo erectus trilliensis ==
In September 1995, Poulianos presented a calcified tibia found in Triglia, Chalkidiki, which he claimed belonged to a Homo erectus form he termed Homo erectus trilliensis, and which he dated to 11 million years before the present. Poulianos believed that his discovery may challenge the Out of Africa theory regarding human evolution.

== Death ==
Aris Poulianos died on 21 March 2021, at the age of 96. However, news of his death was not widely publicised until 2023.

== Published works ==
- 1960 - "The Origin of Greeks"; Ph.D. thesis at Moscow Institute of Anthropology; Reprinted in Athens in 1962, 1965, 1968, and 1988.
- 1961 - "Discovery of a Skull of Palaeolithic Man in Greece"; Voprossi Anthropologhii, 8:162.
- 1963 - "New Palaeolithic Finds of Greece"; Sov. Arheologhia, 2: 227-229.
- 1965 - "On the Position of the Petralona Man within Palaeoanthropi"; Sov. Ethnografia, 2: 91-99.
- 1967 - "The Place of the Petralonian Man among Palaeoanthropi"; Anthropos C 19, (N.S.11): 216-221. in Akten Anthropologischen Kongresses Brno.
- 1971 - "Petralona: A Middle Pleistocene Cave in Greece"; Archaeology, 24: 6-11.
- 1975 - "Palaeoanthropological excavations at Petralona. Prakt. Archaeol.; Et.: 131-136. Athens.
- 1977 - "Stratigraphy and Age of the Petralonian Archanthropus"; Anthropos, 4: 37-46. Athens.
- 1980 - "The Petralona Finds"; Thessaloniki. Yearbook of the Society of Macedonian Studies: 65-76.
- 1981 - "Pre-sapiens Man in Greece"; Current Anthropology, 22 (3): 287 - 288.
- 1981 - "Climatic Fluctuations at Petralona Cave"; Terra Cognita.

== Sources ==
- Curtis Runnels and Tjeerd H. van Andel, "The Early Stone Age of the Nomos of Preveza: Landscape and Settlement", Hesperia Supplements, Vol. 32, Landscape Archaeology in Southern Epirus, Greece 1 (2003), pp. 47–134.
