= Petralona (disambiguation) =

Petralona can refer to:

- Petralona, a neighborhood of Athens;
- Petralona (Chalcidice), a village in Chalcidice, famous for the Petralona cave in which was discovered in 1960 the earliest European humanoid.
