= Armadillidium petralonense =

Scientific classification
- Kingdom: Animalia
- Phylum: Arthropoda
- Class: Malacostraca
- Order: Isopoda
- Suborder: Oniscidea
- Family: Armadillidiidae
- Genus: Armadillidium
- Species: A. petralonense

Binomial name
- Armadillidium petralonense Schmalfuss, 2008
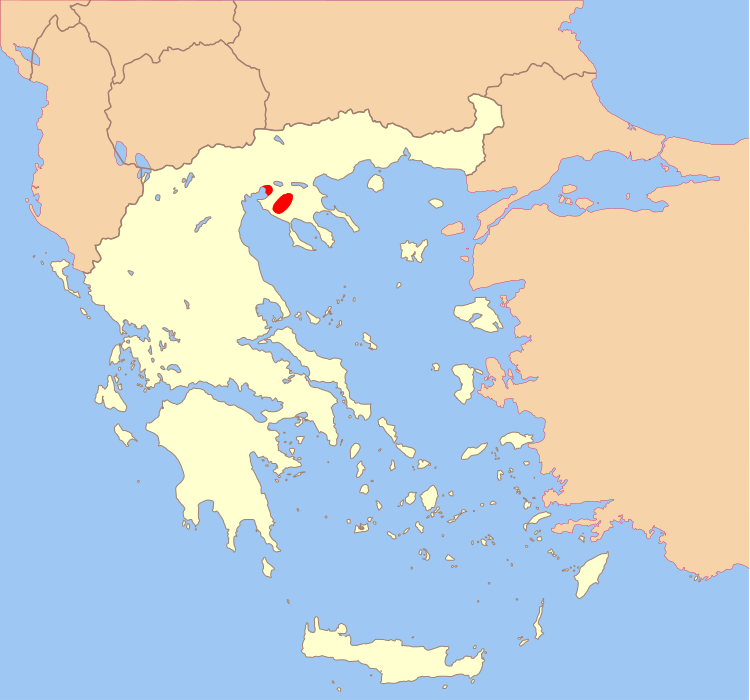
- Distribution of Armadillidium petralonense (in red)

Species of crustacean

Armadillidium petralonense is a European species of woodlouse endemic to Greece. It is a relatively medium-sized species that probably belongs to the so-called "Armadillidium fossuligerum complex".

== Taxonomy ==
Armadilliidum petralonense was described as a distinct species of Armadillidium in 2008, based on specimens collected as far back as 1960. The species is also thought to belong to the "Armadillidium fossuligerum complex", a group of 4 species (A. jerenntrupi, A. fossuligerum sensu lato, A. petralonense and A. pieperi) that occur in the southern part of the Balkan Peninsula (mainly Greece and the adjacent areas of North Macedonia and Bulgaria). It can be separated from the first two species by the shape of the telson (pointed instead of truncate) and from the allopatric, but very similar, A. pieperi by the ventral shape of the ischium of the seventh pereiopod of the male (straight in A. petralonense vs strongly concave in A. pieperi).

== Description ==
Armadillidium petralonense is a medium-sized species, reaching maximum dimensions of about 15 x 7 mm. Its tergites are smooth and show a slight rugosity. The coloration of the body consists of grey tergites, decorated with small yellow spots at the attachment sites of the thoracic muscles, and yellowish-grey epimera. The frontal shield surpasses the anterior edge of the head, has a completely rounded upper margin and lacks lateral angles. The head itself has a distinct groove in the middle, immediately behind the frontal shield. The secondary antennae have rounded lobes and the second article of the flagellum is slightly longer than the first. The hind margins of the first pair of epimera are obtuse-angled. The telson is slightly longer than wide, has nearly straight sides and a broadly rounded tip.

Concerning the sexual characters of the male, the first pereiopod bears a brush of short spines and the seventh pereiopod has a ventrally straight ischium, decorated with a hair field at its apical part. The posterior lobe of the exopodite of the first pleopod is triangular and the apex of the endopodite is straight .

== Distribution ==
Armadillidium petralonense is endemic to the Greek regional units of Thessaloniki and Chalkidiki in the region of Central Macedonia. Specifically, specimens have been collected from the eastern suburb of Panorama, near the city of Thessaloniki, in the former region and from the towns of Galatista and Petralona in the latter.
