= Armadillidium jerrentrupi =

Scientific classification
- Kingdom: Animalia
- Phylum: Arthropoda
- Class: Malacostraca
- Order: Isopoda
- Suborder: Oniscidea
- Family: Armadillidiidae
- Genus: Armadillidium
- Species: A. jerrentrupi

Binomial name
- Armadillidium jerrentrupi Schmalfuss, 2008
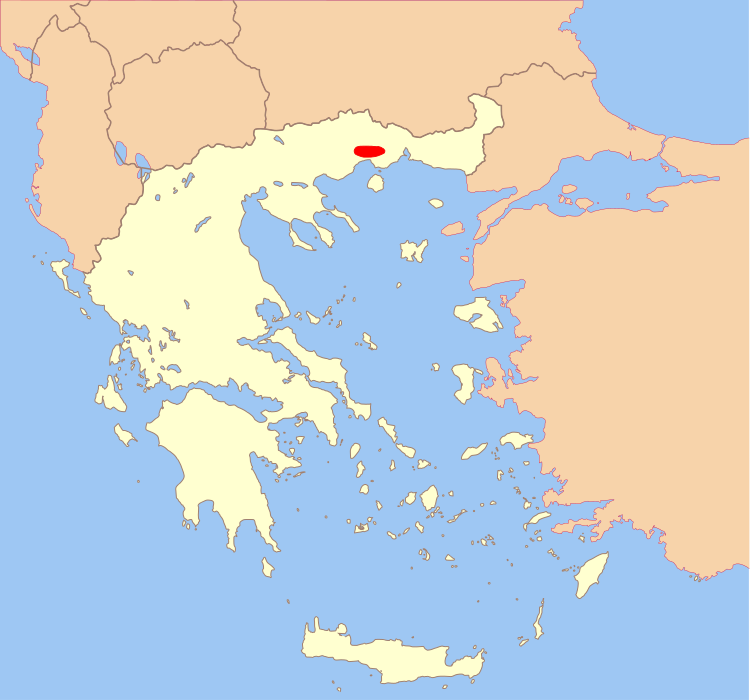
- Distribution of Armadillidium jerrentrupi (in red)

Species of crustacean

Armadillidium jerrentrupi is a European species of woodlouse endemic to Greece. It is a relatively medium-sized species that probably belongs to the so-called "Armadillidium fossuligerum complex".

== Taxonomy ==
Armadilliidum jerrentrupi was described as a distinct species of Armadillidium in 2008, based on specimens collected as far back as 1990. The species is also thought to belong to the "Armadillidium fossuligerum complex", a group of 4 species (A. jerenntrupi, A. fossuligerum sensu lato, A. petralonense and A. pieperi) that occur in the southern part of the Balkan Peninsula (mainly Greece and the adjacent areas of North Macedonia and Bulgaria). It can be separated from the latter two species by the shape of the telson (truncate instead of pointed) and from the allopatric, but extremely variable, A. fossuligerum sensu lato by the different coloration, the more slender secondary antennae, the ventral shape of the ischium of the seventh pereiopod of the male (concave in A. fossuligerum sensu lato vs straight in A. jerrentrupi) and the longer uropod-exopodites.

== Description ==
Armadillidium jerrentrupi is a medium-sized species, reaching maximum dimensions of about 17 x 7.3 mm. Its tergites are completely smooth. Two color morphs have been described: at the western part of its distribution, the specimens are uniformly dark grey, but at the eastern part, the epimera and hind margins of the tergites are yellowish. The frontal shield surpasses the anterior edge of the head, has a nearly straight upper margin and bears obliquely-rounded lateral angles. The secondary antennae have semicircular lobes and the two articles of the flagellum are more or less equal in length. The hind margins of the first pair of epimera have pronounced angles. The telson is conspicuously longer than wide, has nearly straight sides and a broadly truncated tip.

Concerning the sexual characters of the male, the first pereiopod has a brush of short spines on the carpus and the ischium of the seventh pereiopod is ventrally straight and decorated with a hair field at its apical part. The posterior lobe of the exopodite of the first pleopod is short and triangular and the apex of the endopodite is straight .

== Distribution ==
Armadillidium jerrentrupi is endemic to the Greek regional units of Kavala and Xanthi, in the region of Eastern Macedonia and Thrace. Specifically, all the known specimens have been collected in the area of the lower Nestos river system.

== Ecology ==
Armadillidium jerrentrupi has been found in three types of habitat: mixed forests, maquis shrublands and mixed maquis-Castanea forests.
