= Armadillidium pieperi =

Scientific classification
- Kingdom: Animalia
- Phylum: Arthropoda
- Class: Malacostraca
- Order: Isopoda
- Suborder: Oniscidea
- Family: Armadillidiidae
- Genus: Armadillidium
- Species: A. pieperi

Binomial name
- Armadillidium pieperi Schmalfuss, 2008
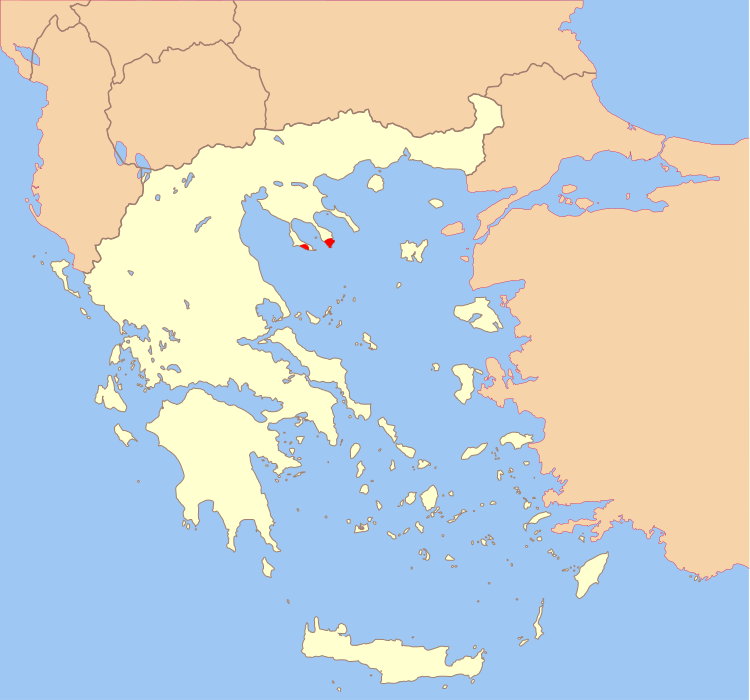
- Distribution of Armadillidium pieperi (in red)

Species of crustacean

Armadillidium pieperi is a European species of woodlouse endemic to Greece. It is a relatively medium-sized species that probably belongs to the so-called "Armadillidium fossuligerum complex".

== Taxonomy ==
Armadilliidum pieperi was described as a distinct species of Armadillidium in 2008, based on specimens collected as far back as 1980. The species is also thought to belong to the "Armadillidium fossuligerum complex", a group of 4 species (A. jerenntrupi, A. fossuligerum sensu lato, A. petralonense and A. pieperi) that occur in the southern part of the Balkan Peninsula (mainly Greece and the adjacent areas of North Macedonia and Bulgaria). It can be separated from the first two species by the shape of the telson (pointed instead of truncate) and from the allopatric, but very similar, A. petralonense by the ventral shape of the ischium of the seventh pereiopod of the male (strongly concave in A. pieperi vs straight in A. petralonense).

== Description ==
Armadillidium petralonense is a medium-sized species, reaching maximum dimensions of about 17 x 6.7 mm. Its tergites are faintly tuberculated and have a uniform greyish-brown coloration with lighter epimera. Like its sister species, A. petralonense, the frontal shield surpasses the anterior edge of the head, has a completely rounded upper margin and lacks lateral angles. Also, the head itself has a distinct groove in the middle, immediately behind the frontal shield. The secondary antennae have trapezoidal lobes and the second article of the flagellum is slightly longer than the first. The hind margins of the first pair of epimera are obtuse-angled. The telson is as wide as long, has nearly straight sides and a rounded tip.

Concerning the sexual characters of the male, the first pereiopod has a few short spines on the carpus and the ischium of the seventh pereiopod is ventrally concave and decorated with a hair field at its apical part. The posterior lobe of the exopodite of the first pleopod is triangular and the apex of the endopodite is straight .

== Distribution ==
Armadillidium pieperi is endemic to the Greek regional unit of Chalkidiki in the region of Central Macedonia. Specifically, until now, specimens have been collected only from the southernmost regions of the two peninsular municipalities of Chalkidiki, namely Kassandra and Sithonia.
