= Petralona skull =

Hominid skull found in Greece in 1960

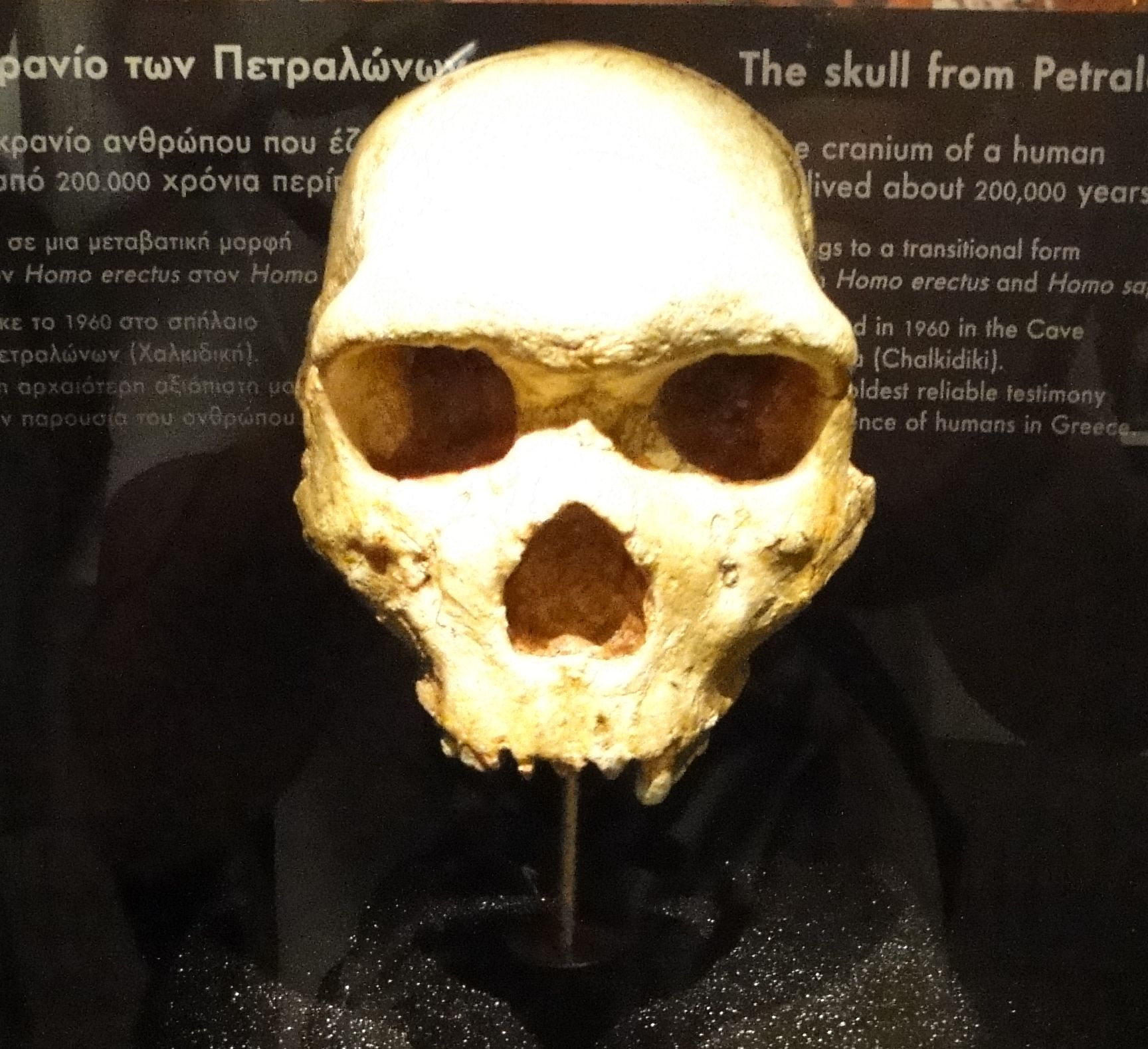
- The Petralona skull, exhibited in the Archaeological Museum of Thessaloniki.
- Common name: Petralona skull
- Species: Homo, Homo heidelbergensis
- Place discovered: Chalkidiki, Greece
- Date discovered: 1960
- Discovered by: Christos Sariannidis

The Petralona skull is an early human skull found in Petralona Cave, about 35 km (22 mi) southeast of Thessaloniki city on the Chalkidiki peninsula, Greece. According to the excavation lead Aris Poulianos, it was found by a villager named Christos Sariannidis in 1960. It was covered and adhered to the wall by calcite encrustation in a small cavern, called "Layer 10" by Poulianos, about 30 cm (12 in) above ground, missing the mandible. The fossils have been preserved at the Geology School of the Aristotle University of Thessaloniki since 1960.

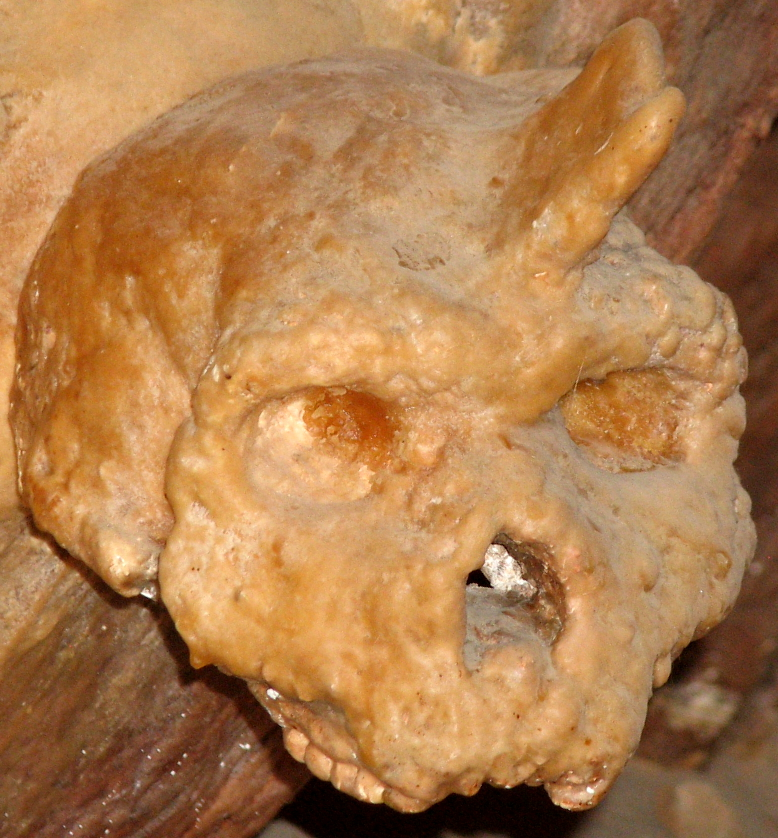
The Petralona skull in situ, covered by stalagmite.

== Dating ==
Poulianos (1981) estimated the age of the skull at around 700,000 years. He announced that "the date was based on analyses of the cave's stratigraphy and the accumulated sediments".

Poulianos concluded that the skull represented a previously unknown hominin genus, unrelated to Homo erectus, and even outside of Homo, introducing the genus name Archanthropus, and the trinomial Archanthropus europaeus petraloniensis for the Petralona skull itself. Independent paleoanthropologists have tended to classify the skull as either Homo erectus, Homo heidelbergensis or Homo neanderthalensis. Poulianos's claims have been a continuing cause of controversy since, his conclusions being in conflict with mainstream models of the speciation of genus Homo and its early dispersal.

In 1981, the age of the Petralona skull deduced by Poulianos was investigated and the protocol published in the journal Nature. The scientists involved used electron spin resonance measurements of the calcite encrustation and of bone fragments, and dated the age of the skull to between 240,000 and 160,000 years old. Poulianos dated the fossil stratigraphically, claiming an age of the relevant layer of about 670,000 years old, also based on electron spin resonance measurements. Other researchers point out that contextual animal fossils "found with it are known elsewhere from approximately 350,000 years ago". In 1987, researchers announced that the cranium cannot be older than 620,000 years, based on palaeomagnetic and mineral magnetic studies of the cave's sediments.

A 2025 study based on U-series dates of the calcite that encrusted the skull yielded an age of 286,000 years old. As the calcite grew over the skull after it was emplaced, this represents a minimum age bound of the skull. This study estimated the age of the skull at around 300,000 years.

== Layer 10 ==
In 1992 an international team published its results of a uranium-series dating analysis of the small cavern, called "The Mausoleum", where the skull was allegedly found and the sediments, named "Layer 10" by Poulianos. The results confirm earlier findings "that the whole of layer 10 represents a long time span, from about 160 ka to more than 350 ka". The minimum age refers to the brown calcite layer, which covered and cemented the skull to the wall. The fossil encrustation is insufficient to date it by alpha-spectrometric, uranium-series methods, yet its minimum age was concluded to be also 160,000 years.

Today, most academics who have analyzed the Petralona remains classify it as Homo erectus. It has also been classified by others as Homo heidelbergensis, Neanderthal (Homo neanderthalensis) and as an early population of Homo sapiens sapiens.

Runnels and van Andel summarise the situation as follows: "The only known hominid fossil in Greece that may be relevant is the Petralona hominid, found by chance in 1960 in a deep cavern in the Chalkidiki. Controversy surrounds the interpretation of this cranium, and it has been variously classified as Homo erectus, as a classic Neanderthal (Homo neanderthalensis), and as an early representative of Homo sapiens in a generalized sense. The consensus among today's paleoanthropologists [is centered around the idea] that the cranium belongs to an archaic hominid distinguished from Homo erectus and both the classic Neanderthals and anatomically modern humans. Whatever the final classification may be, the cranium has been provisionally dated to ca. 200–400 thousand years old and it is thus possible that the Petralona hominid is a representative of the lineage responsible for the Thessalian Lower Paleolithic sites." In this quote, "hominids" refers to an older meaning encompassing the genus Homo and various ancestral groups and their sister branches descending from the last common ancestor of humans and chimpanzees. The contemporary term "hominids" refers to the family Hominidae (the great apes) and "human" to the genus Homo, including Homo erectus. The term directly replacing the cladistic "hominids" as used by Runnels and van Andel in 1993 would be "australopithecines", the subtribe Hominina.
