= Petralona, Chalkidiki =

Petralona Πετράλωνα
- Community
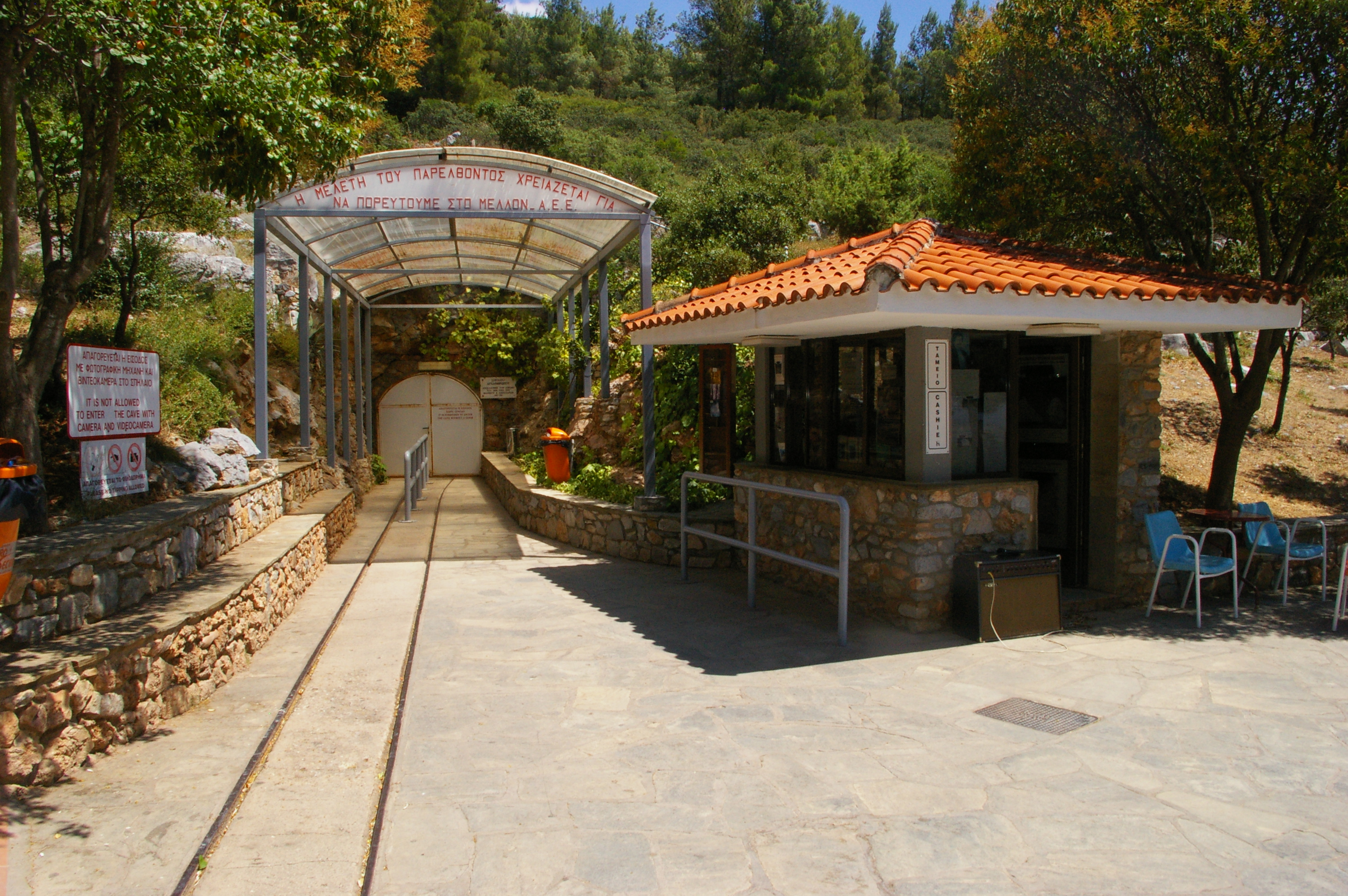
- Petralona cave entrance

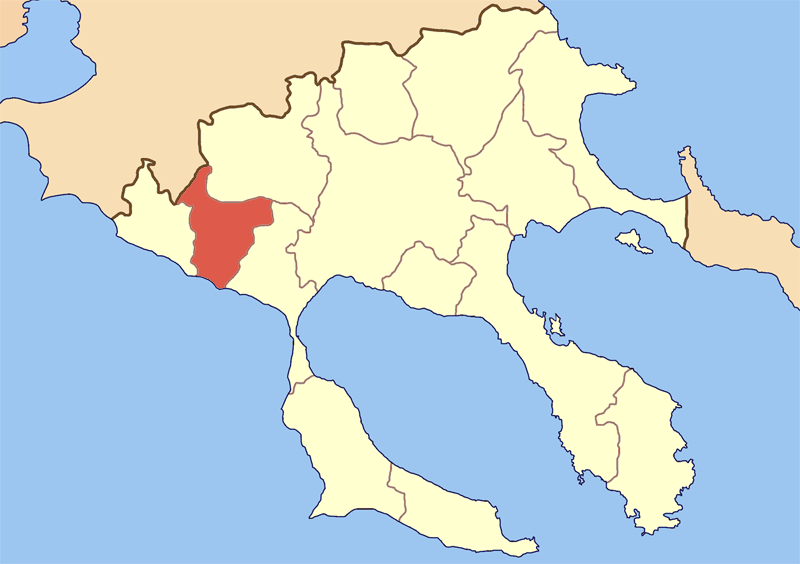
- Location within the regional unit

- Location within Greece
- Coordinates: 40°22′10″N 23°09′33″E
- Country: Greece
- Administrative region: Central Macedonia
- Regional unit: Chalkidiki
- Municipality: Nea Propontida
- Municipal unit: Triglia
- Elevation: 270 m (890 ft)

Population (2021)
  - Community: 316
- Time zone: UTC+2 (EET)
  - Summer (DST): UTC+3 (EEST)
- Vehicle registration: ΧΚ

Petralona (Greek: Πετράλωνα) is a small locality in Chalkidiki, Macedonia, Greece. It is 6 km northwest of Triglia and 35 km southeast of Thessaloniki. Its altitude is 270 m (890 ft).

It is famous for the Petralona Cave about 1 km from the village, in which was discovered one of the earliest European humanoids.

== Prehistory ==
The Petralona Cave, at the foot of Mount Katsika, was discovered in 1959 by a local looking for a spring. In 1960 the Petralona skull was found in the cave. The skull was extremely well preserved and given an initial estimated age of more than 700,000 years. It was named Archanthropus europaeus petraloniensis (Poulianos, 1976).

== Transport ==
Petralona is about 3.75 kilometres (2.33 miles) north of Chalkidiki Provincial Road 4, from the village of Elaiochoria.
