= Triglia =

Triglia Τρίγλια
- Municipal unit
- Location within the regional unit

- Location within Greece
- Coordinates: 40°19′N 23°12′E
- Country: Greece
- Administrative region: Central Macedonia
- Regional unit: Chalkidiki
- Municipality: Nea Propontida

Area
  - Municipal unit: 122.0 km^{2} (47.1 sq mi)
- Elevation: 89 m (292 ft)

Population (2021)
  - Municipal unit: 5,581
  - Municipal unit density: 45.75/km^{2} (118.5/sq mi)
- Time zone: UTC+2 (EET)
  - Summer (DST): UTC+3 (EEST)
- Vehicle registration: ΧΚ

Triglia (Greek: Τρίγλια) is a former municipality in Chalkidiki, Greece. Since the 2011 local government reform it is part of the municipality Nea Propontida, of which it is a municipal unit. The municipal unit has an area of 121.959 km^{2}. Population 5,581 (2021). The seat of the municipality was in Nea Triglia.

== International relations ==
Triglia is twinned with:

- Rafina, Greece
- Tirilye, Turkey
