= Petralona Cave =

Cave and archeological site in Petralona, Chalkidiki, Greece

- Cave of the Red Stones
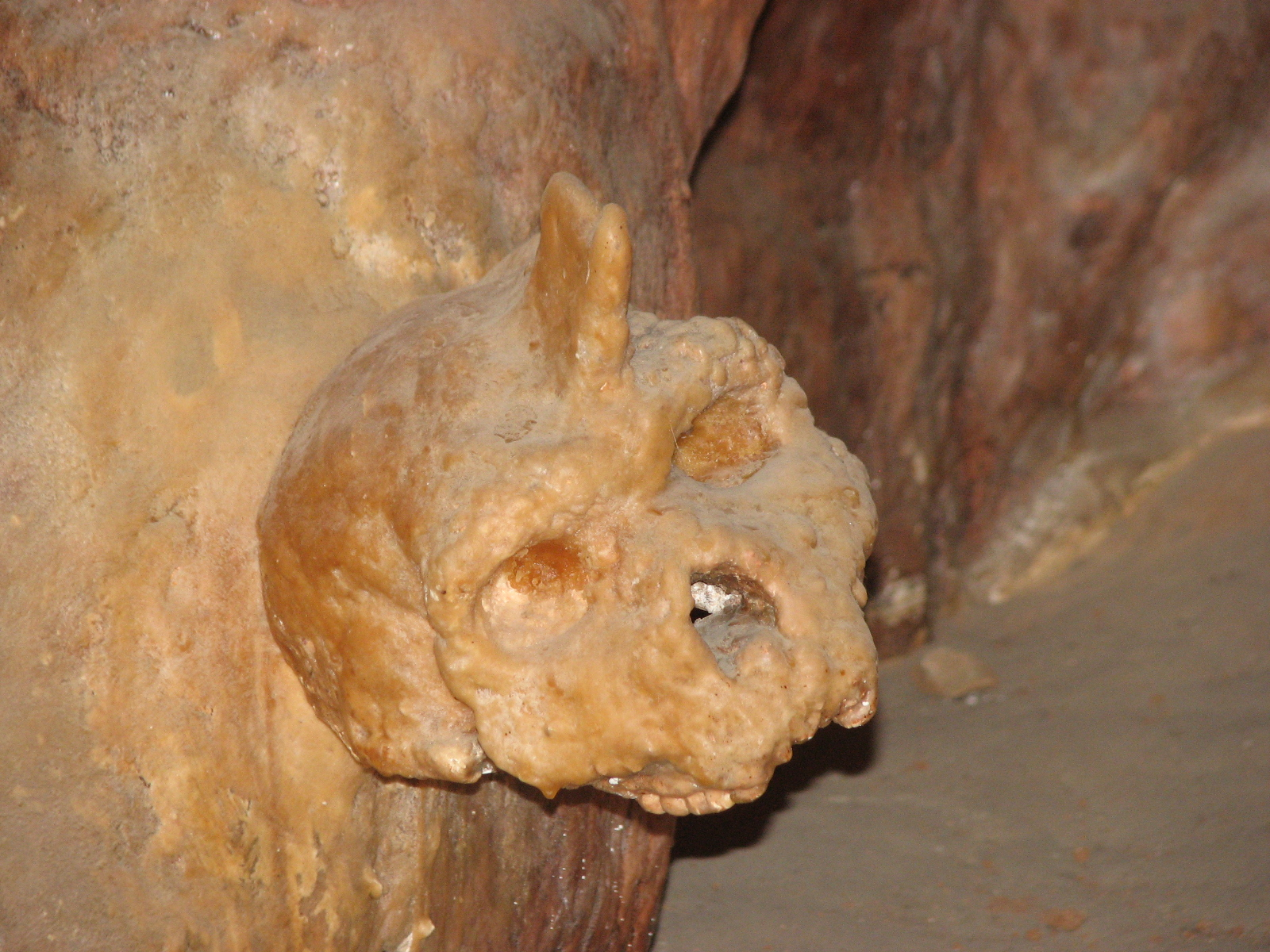
- Petralona skull covered by stalagmite

- Location within Greece
- Location: Greece, Chalcidice
- Coordinates: 40.369697°N 23.159151°E
- Length: 2 kilometres (1 mi)
- Elevation: 300 m (984 ft)
- Discovery: 1959
- Geology: Mesozoic Karst
- Entrances: 1
- Access: The Petralona Cave and Anthropological Museum
- Website: https://petralonacave.gr/

The Petralona Cave (Greek: Σπήλαιο Πετραλώνων) a karst formation, is located at 300 m (984 ft) above sea-level on the western foot of Mount Katsika, about 1 km (0.62 mi) east of the village of Petralona, about 35 km (22 mi) south-east of Thessaloniki city on the Chalkidiki peninsula, Greece. The site came to public attention when in 1960 a fossilized archaic human skull was found. The cave had been discovered accidentally only a year earlier (1959) after erosion had left clefts in the rock. "Bejeweled" with impressive stalactite and stalagmite formations and holding an abundance of fossils, the cave soon attracted geologists and paleontologists. After decades' excavations the cave is open to the public and scientific work is documented and presented in an adjacent archaeological museum.

The cave's most prominent fossil specimen has since been known among paleoanthropologists as the "Petralona Skull".

The onsite museum displays a selection of the objects that have been found in the cave.

In 2011, the cave and museum of Petralona came under the direction of the Greek Archaeological Service, a governmental agency. Since February 2024, Petralona Cave has reopened to the public after undergoing renovations to its infrastructure, while within the spring of 2024, the renovated Museum of Petralona Cave is expected to open.

== Discovery ==
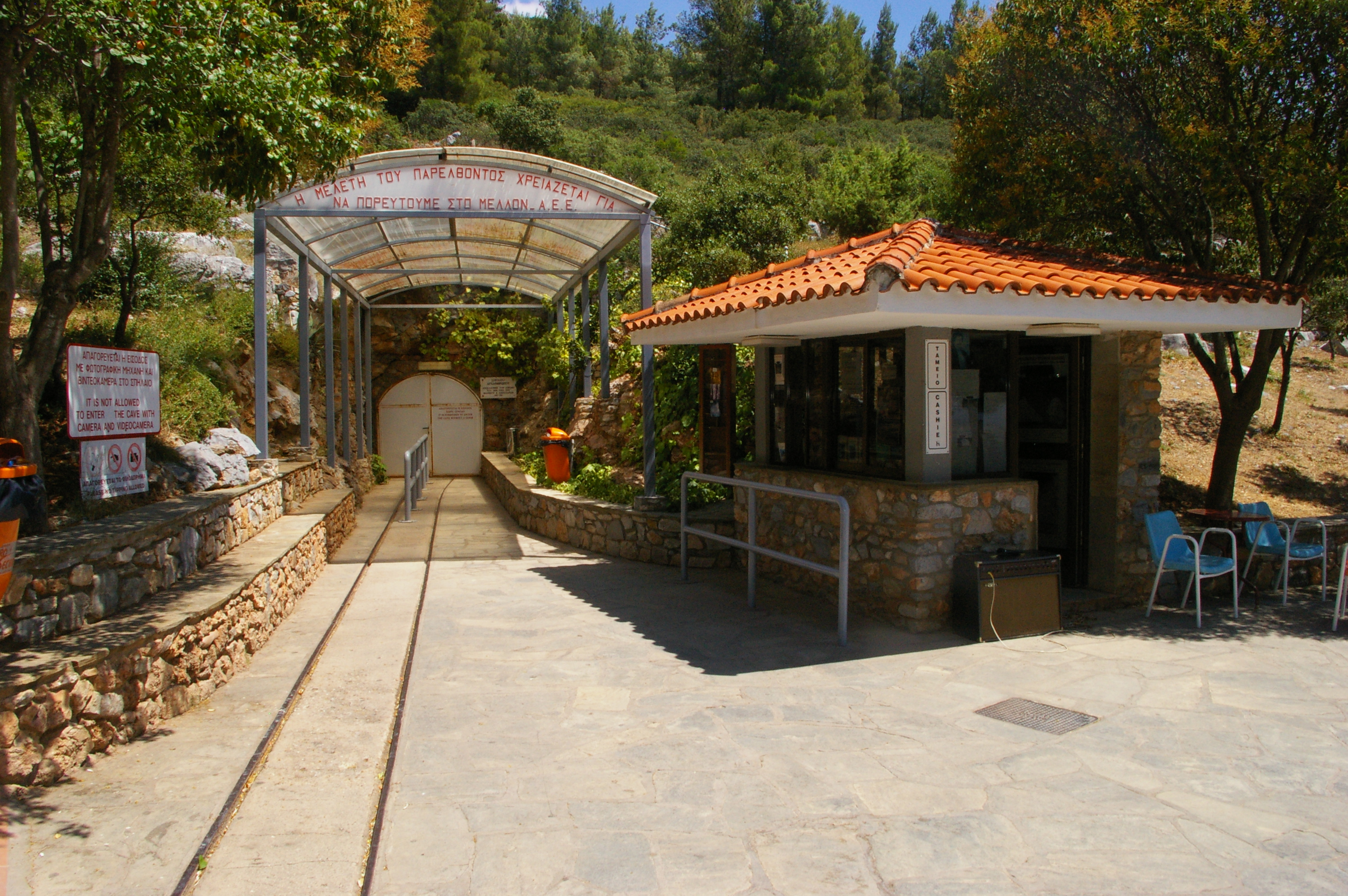
Petralona Cave entrance

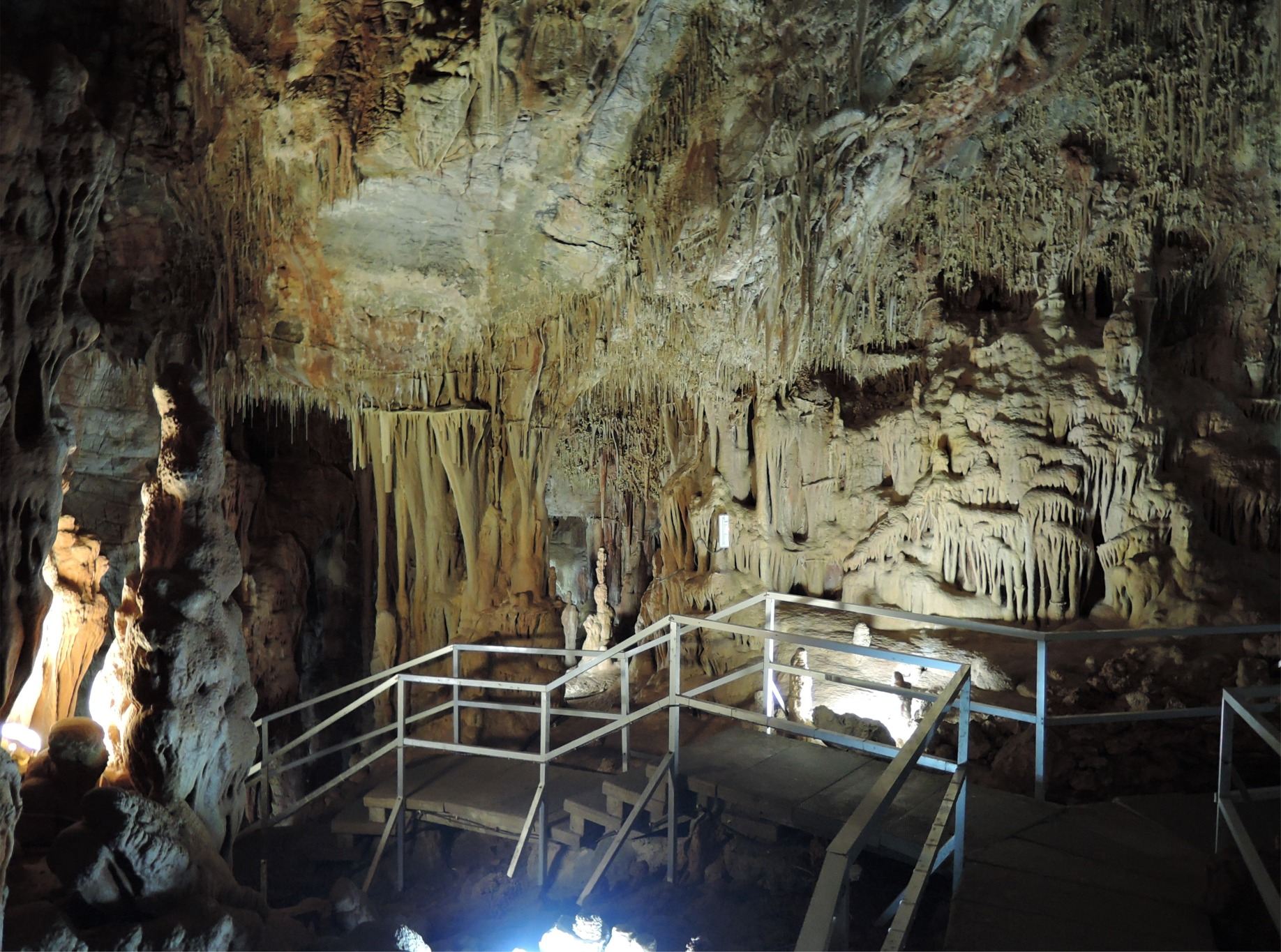
Petralona Cave tourist path

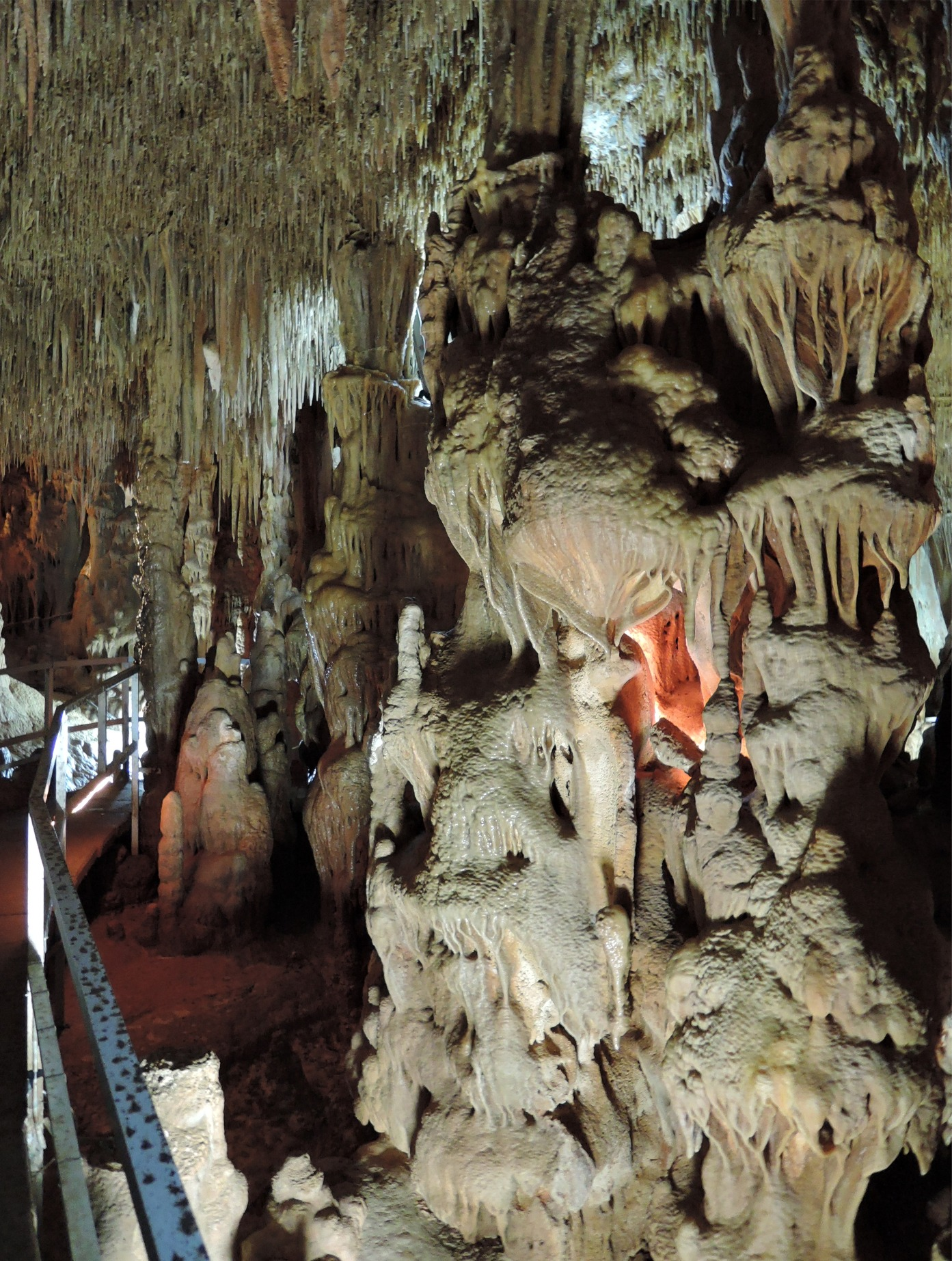
Petralona Cave formations

The cave was discovered accidentally in 1959 by Fillipos Chatzaridis, a local shepherd who was looking for a spring. In his effort to find a water source he found a small cleft on the slopes of Mount Katsika. Two men were lowered down and later described a large number of chambers and corridors, totaling 8 to 10 meters high with rich and beautiful formations of speleothems (stalactites and stalagmites).

The cave developed during the Mesozoic (Jurassic) limestone, its sediments are divided into several stratigraphic levels. "The rock formations resemble giant cactus, pink pearls, sturdy columns or delicate curtains, and in several places water ponds are fed by stalactite material. Covering an area of 10,400 m^{2} (112,000 sq ft), the length of the corridors is about 2,000 m (6,562 ft) and the temperature throughout the year remains stable at 17 °C (± 1 °C)."

The first research of 1959 was undertaken by the Greek speleologist Ioannis Petrocheilos. He found numerous bones of animals, many of them covered with cave coral. From 1968 onward, excavations were carried out by the anthropologist Aris Poulianos. Poulianos complained that excavations on the site were delayed and/or had to be discontinued several times. The first instance was in 1968 and subsequent years due to the Greek coup d'état. Then again in 1983, when the Ministry of Culture declined to re-issue the excavation concession. However, in 1997, after 15 years of trials, the Anthropological Association of Greece was justified by the Supreme Court and ordered to continue its works in the cave. Poulianos repeatedly accused the Greek government of conspiring to suppress his discoveries, as evidenced by the revocation of excavation rights again in 2011.

The excavation research in the cave continues today by the relevant authority of the Hellenic Ministry of Culture, the Ephorate of Palaeoanthropology–Speleology, utilising modern methods and detailed documentation, with the aim of better understanding the history of the cave and its use by animals and humans.

== Petralona skull ==
The Petralona skull was found by a villager, Christos Sariannidis, in 1960. It was sticking to the cave wall in a small cavern of the cave, about 30 cm (12 in) above ground, held by sinter. Its lower jaw is missing and it was "encrusted by brown calcite soon after the death of the individual". Poulianos (1981) dated the skull to an estimated age of around 700,000 years.

Today, most academics who have analyzed the Petralona remains classify the hominid as a Homo heidelbergensis a Middle Pleistocene species, which probably was the common ancestor of Neanderthal Man (Homo neanderthalensis) and Modern Man (Homo sapiens).

The dating of the skull has been attempted by various physical methods, but it still remains uncertain. The most reliable published ages range from 150,000 to 250,000 years before today. The morphology of the skull indicates, however, that it could be older, perhaps 250,000–300,000 years old. Poulianos, on the other hand, believed that the Petralona cranium is derived from an independent class of hominids unrelated to Homo erectus.

== Fossil fauna ==
The Petralona Cave is very rich in fossils: Since its discovery, thousands of fossils have been excavated, belonging mainly to mammals, but also amphibians, reptiles and birds. In total more than 50 species have been identified. The most common and impressive are cave bears and spotted hyenas. These species used the cave as a winter shelter (hibernation place) and den, respectively. Herbivorous mammals are mainly represented by horses, ibexes and deer. Their bones ended up in the cave usually as the prey of hyenas. Some, however, bear traces of sharp tools and percussion marks, indicating that they were once food of Paleolithic man. These finds are archaeological remains, which give us valuable information about the animals hunted by the cave's occupants, as well as about the way they managed the game-animal resources.

=== Fish ===
- indeterminate species

=== Amphibians ===
- Bufo bufo (Linnaeus) (common toad)
- Pelobates fuscus Laurenti (a species of toad)

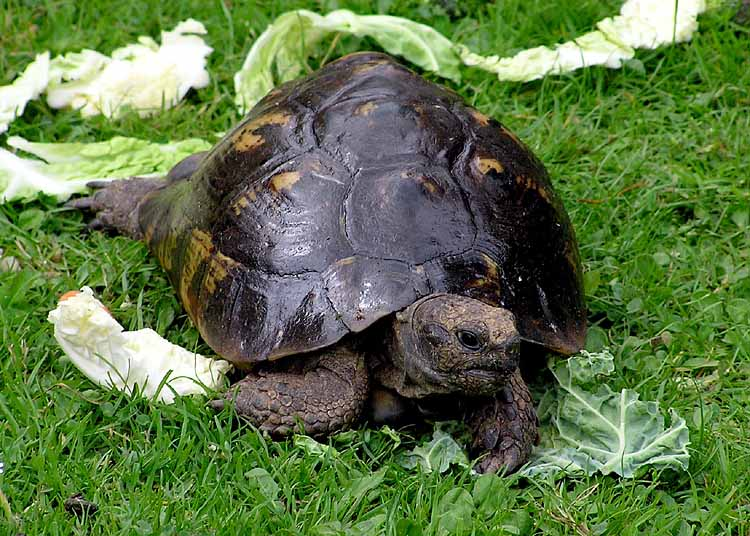
Testudo graeca

=== Reptiles ===
- Testudo graeca Linnaeus (spur-thighed tortoise)
- Testudo sp. (giant)
- Varanus intermedius Bolkay
- Lacerta trilineata (Betriaga) (Balkan green lizard)
- Lacerta viridis (Laurenti) (European green lizard)
- Lacerta sp. (small) (lizards)
- Ophidia indet. (snakes)

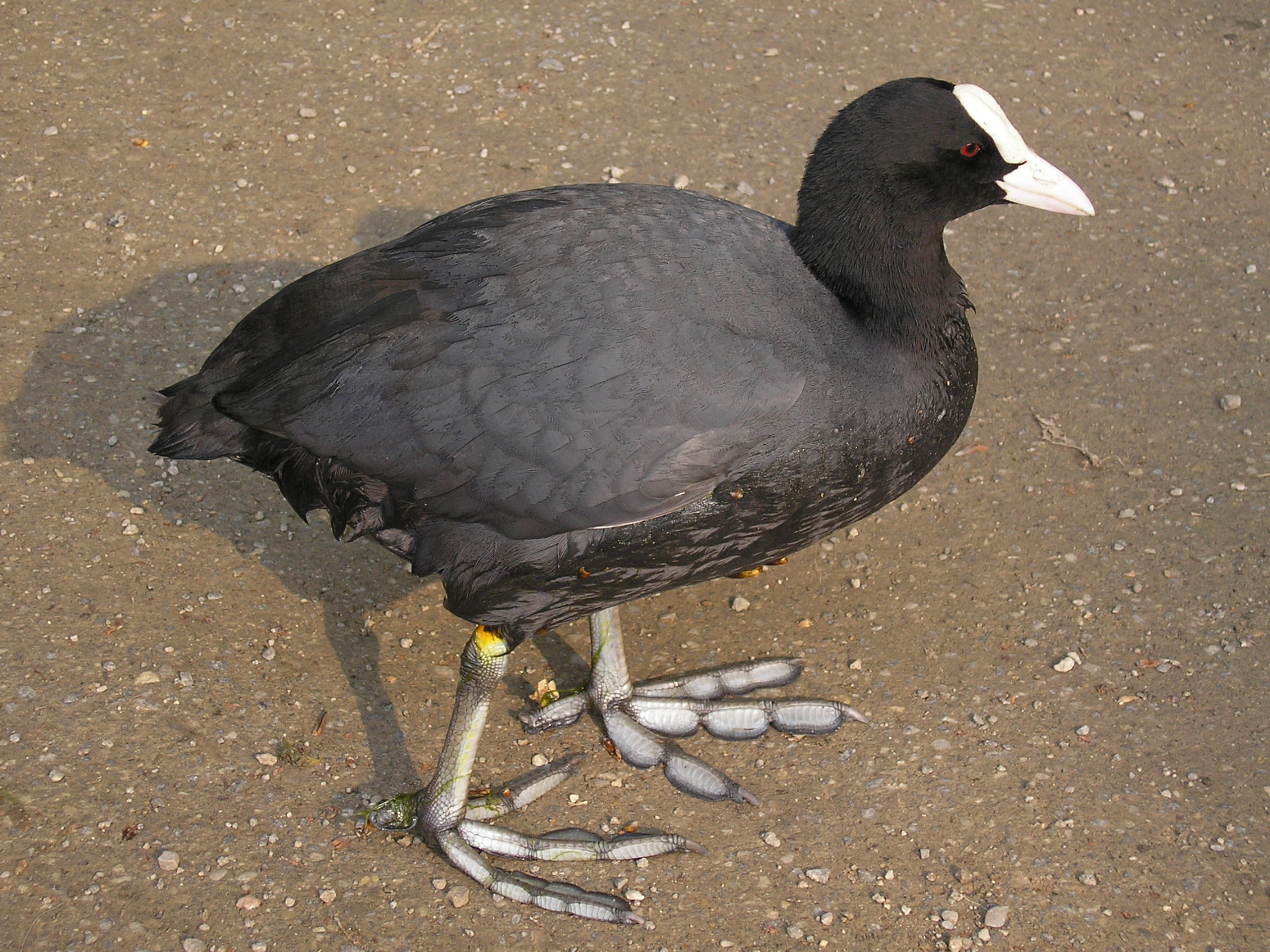
Fulica atra

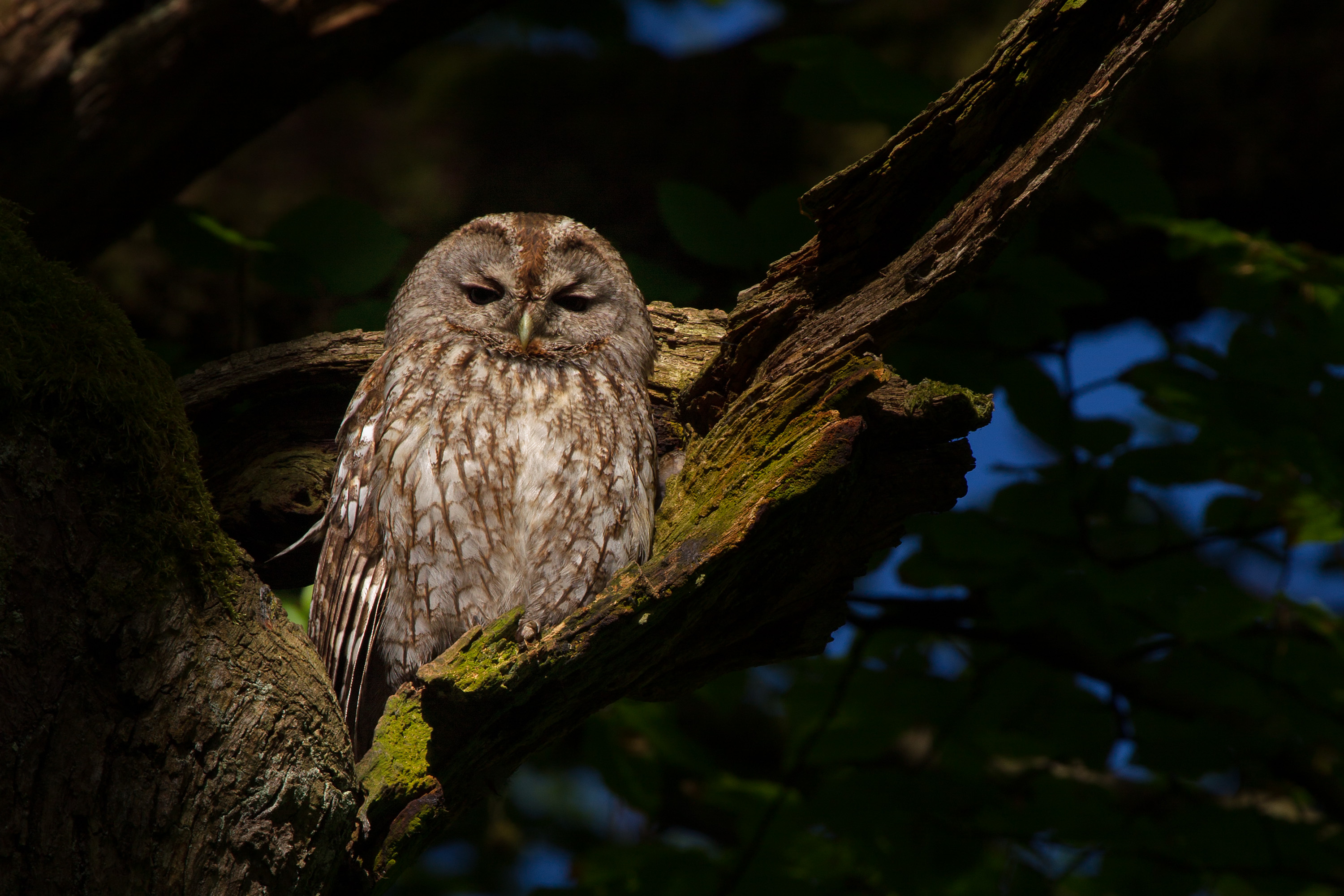
Strix aluco

=== Birds ===
- Anser anser Linnaeus (greylag goose)
- Aythya ferina Linnaeus (common pochard)
- Fulica atra Linnaeus (eurasian coot)
- Buthierax pouliani Kretzoi (extinct species of eagle)
- Falco tinnunculus Linnaeus (common kestrel)
- Alectoris sp. (species of partridges)
  - Alectoris graeca mediterranea Maurer-Chauvire' (rock partridge)
- Perdix jurcsaki (Kretzoi) (a species of partridge)
- Scolopacidae indet. (family of waders or shorebirds – sandpipers, curlew, snipe and other associated species)
- Larus sp. (a genus of gulls)
- Columba oenas ssp. (stock dove)
- Columba livia ssp. (rock pigeon)
- Columba palumbus Linnaeus (common wood pigeon)
- Strix aluco Linnaeus (tawny owl)
- Glaucidium Linnaeus (pygmy owls)
- Bubo sp. (horned owl and associated species)
- Corvus corax Linnaeus (common raven)
- Pyrrhocorax graculus vetus Kretzoi (alpine chough)
- Turdus sp. (a genus of true thrushes)
- Lanius minor Gmelin (lesser grey shrike)
- Prunella collaris Scopoli (alpine accentor)
- Passeriformes indet. I, II

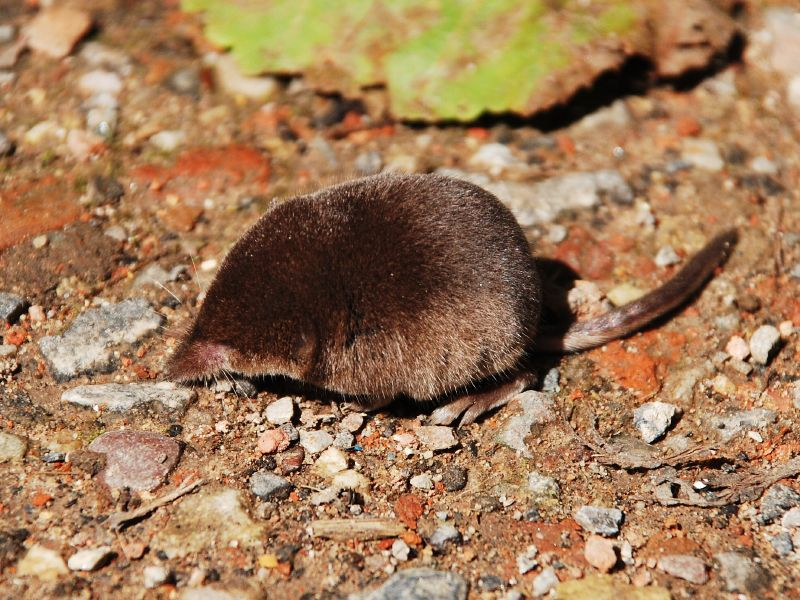
Sorex minutus

=== Mammals ===
==== Insectivores ====
- Erinaceus europaeus praeglacialis Brunner (preglaciation European hedgehog )
- Sorex minutus Linnaeus (Eurasian pygmy shrew)
- Sorex runtonensis (Hinton)
- Pachyura etrusca (Savi)
- Talpa minuta Freudenberg (a genus of moles)

==== Primates ====
- Archanthropus europaeus petraloniensis or Homo Heidelbergensis Α. Poulianos

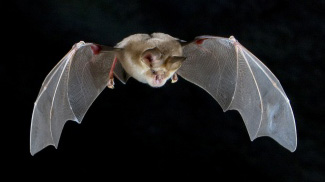
Rhinolophus mehelyi

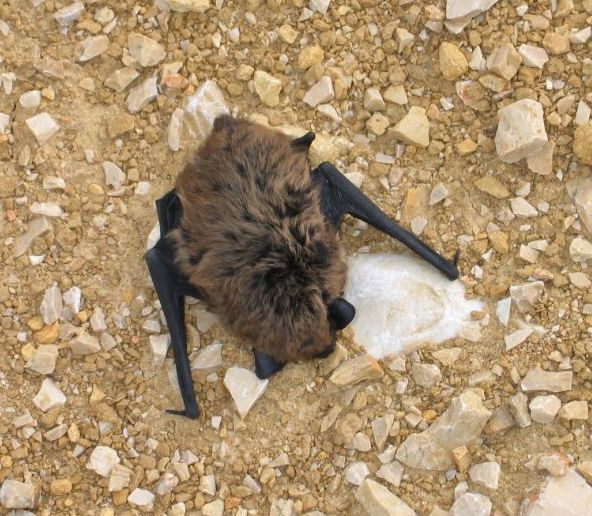
Savi's pipistrelle

==== Chiroptera (bats) ====
- Rhinolophus sp. indét. I, II
- Rhinolophus ferrumequinum topali Kretzoi (a subspecies of greater horseshoe bat)
- Rhinolophus mehelyi Matschie (Mehely's horseshoe bat)
- Rhinolophus hipposideros Bechstein (lesser horseshoe bat)
- Miniopterus schreibersii Kuhl (common bent-wing bat)
- Myotis sp. indét. I, II (genus of mouse-eared bats)
- Myotis myotis Borkhausen (greater mouse-eared bat)
- Myotis blythi oxygnathus Monticelli
- Myotis blythi ssp.
- Myotis emarginatus Geoffroy (Geoffroy's bat)
- Myotis daubentonii (Kuhl) (Daubenton's bat)
- Vespertilio murinus Linnaeus (particoloured bat)
- Hypsugo savii Bonaparte (Savi's pipistrelle)
- Eptesicus sp. (a genus of bats)
- Nyctalus noctula (Schreber) (common noctule)
- Pipistrellus (?) sp. (a genus of bats)

==== Lagomorpha ====
- Lepus terraerubrae (Kretzoi)
- Oryctolagus sp. (European rabbit)

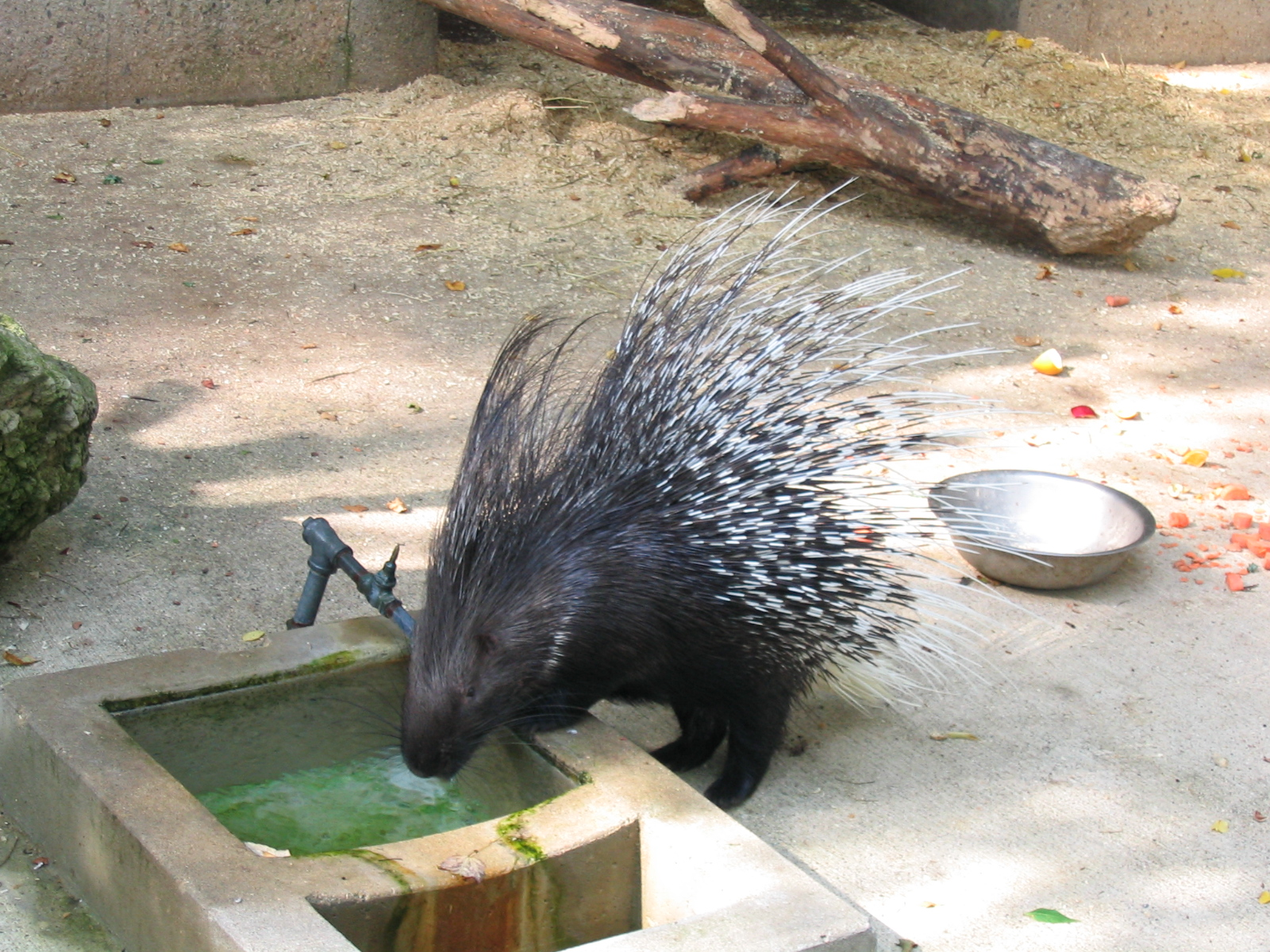
Hystrix (porcupine)

==== Rodents ====
- Urocitellus primigenius daphnae Kretzoi (extinct species of Urocitellus or ground squirrel)
- Hystrix sp. (a genus of porcupines)
- Gliridae indet. (a genus of dormouse)
- Dryomimus eliomyoides arisi Kretzoi
- Parasminthus brevidens Kretzoi
- Spalax chalkidikae Kretzoi
- Apodemus mystacinus crescendus Kretzoi
- Mus synanthropus (Mus (Budamys) synanthropus) Kretzoi (a subspecies of Mus)
- Allocricetus bursae simplex Kretzoi
- Lagurus transiens Janossy (a species of Lagurus – voles, lemmings, and related species)
- Eolagurus argyropuloi zazhighini Ν. Poulianos (a genus of rodents)
- Arvicola cantiana Heinrich (a species of vole)
- Microtus praeguentheri Kretzoi (a species of vole)

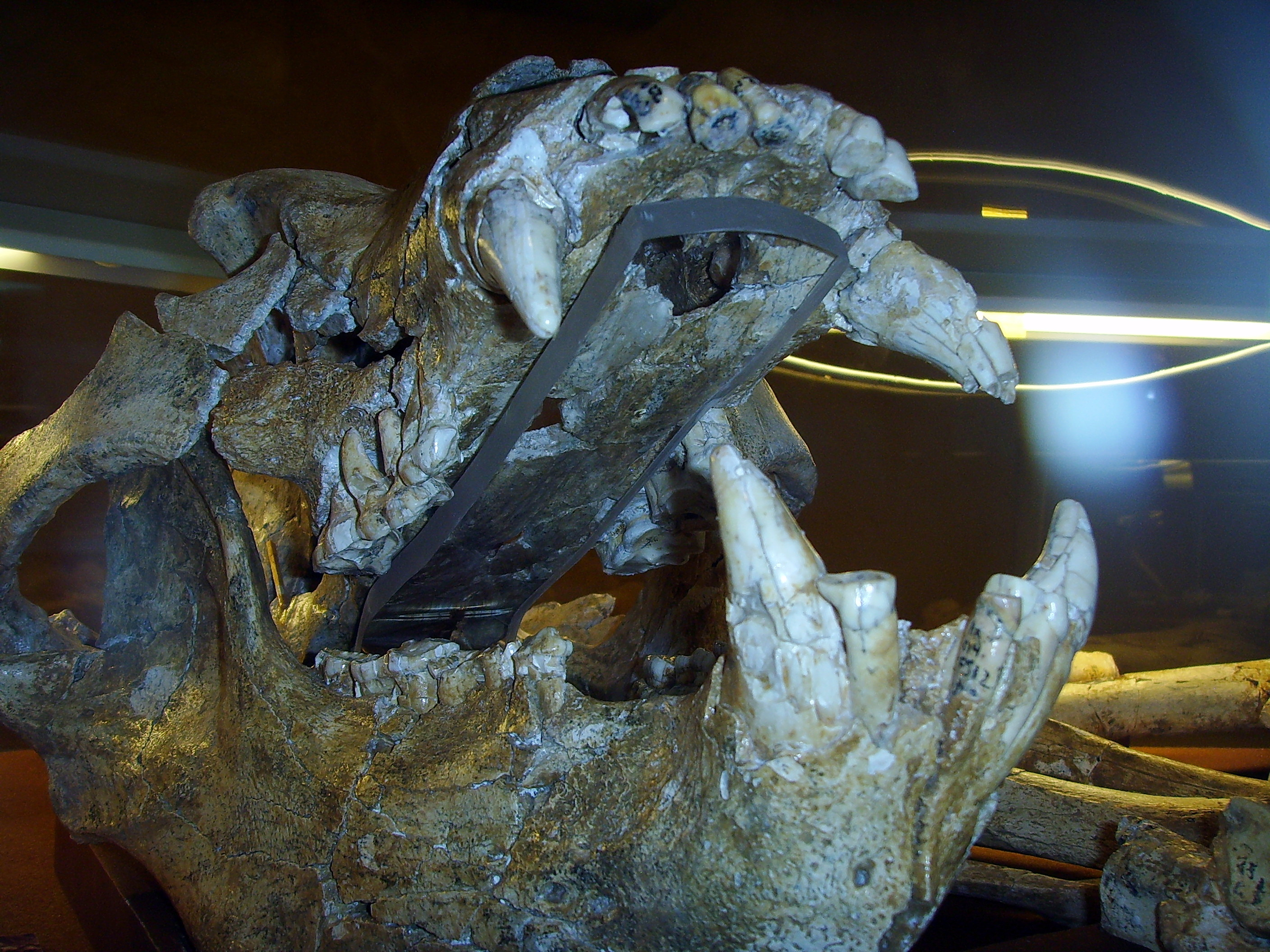
Skull of Ursus deningeri

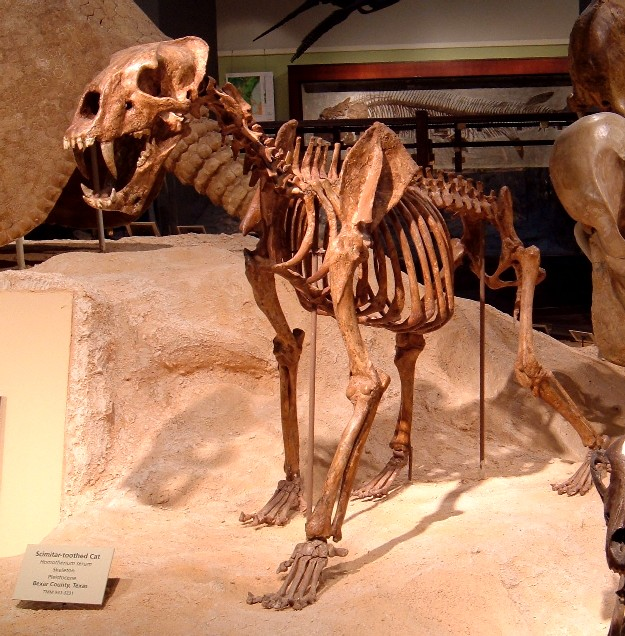
Mounted skeleton of Homotherium

==== Carnivorans ====
- † Canis lupus mosbachensis Soergel (prehistoric wolf species)
- † Cuon priscus Thenius (Early Middle Pleistocene dhole or wild dog)
- † Xenocyon lycaonoides Kretzoi
- † Meles meles atavus ? (Kormos) (primitive European badger)
- † Ursus stehlini ? (Kretzoi)
- † Ursus deningeri Reichenau
- † Crocuta petralonae Kurten
- † Pachycrocuta brevirostris Aymard (a subspecies of prehistoric hyenas)
- † Pachycrocuta perrieri Croizet & Jobert (a subspecies of prehistoric hyenas)
- † Panthera leo fossilis Reichenau (primitive cave lion)
- † Panthera gombaszoegensis Kretzoi (European jaguar)
- † Panthera pardus Linnaeus (leopard)
- † Felis silvestris hamadryas ? (Kurten) (species of wild cat)
- † Homotherium sp. (close to the sabertooth tiger)
- † Vulpes praeglacialis (Kormos) a true vulpes fox

==== Proboscidea ====
- Elephas sp. (genus of elephants)

==== Perissodactyla ====
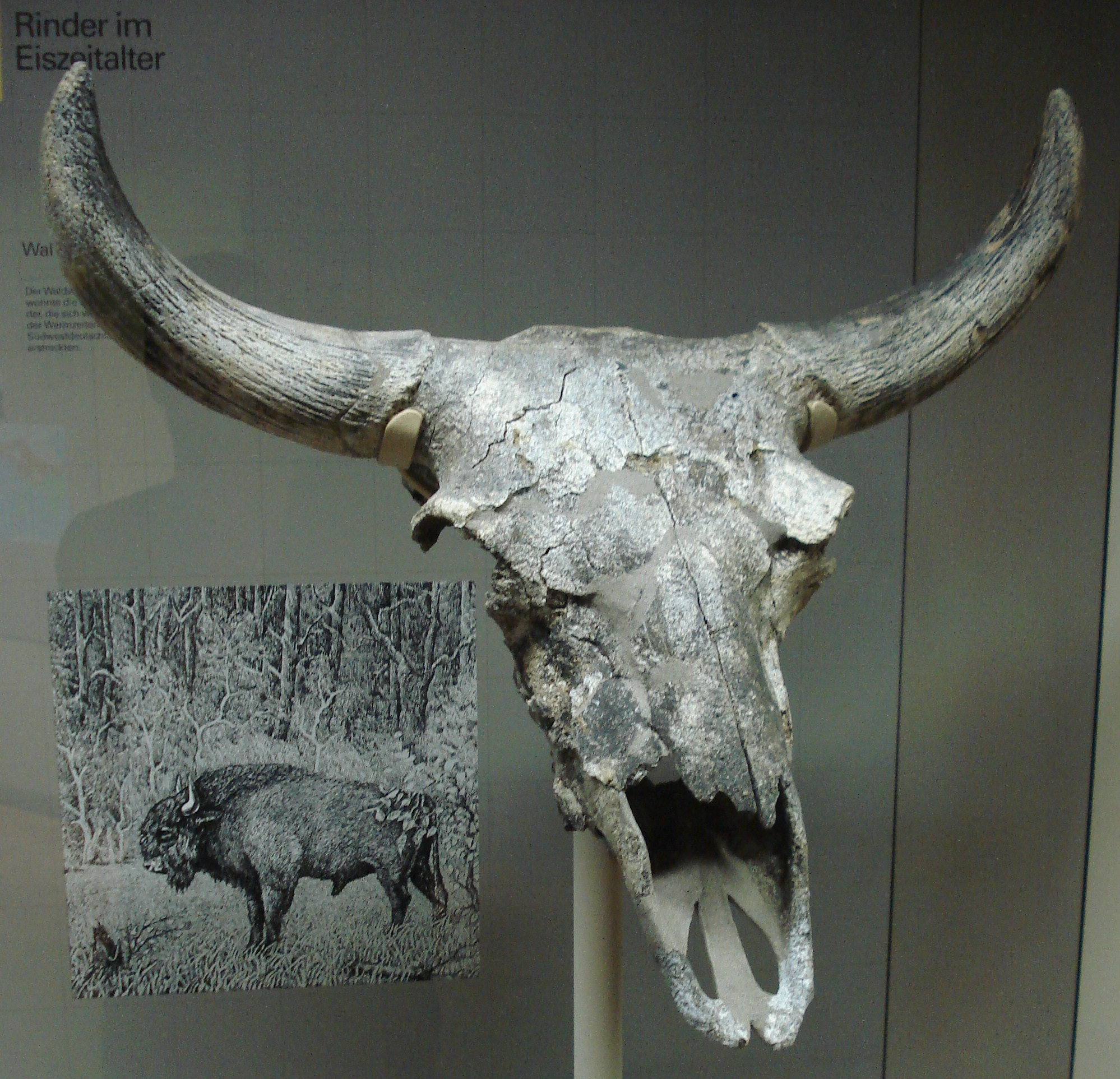
Bison schoetensacki

- Equus mosbachensis (Reichenau)
- Equus hydruntinus ssp. (European ass)
- Equus stenonis petraloniensis Tsoukala
- Stephanorhinus hemitoechus (Narrow-nosed rhinoceros)

==== Artiodactyla ====
- Sus scrofa ssp.(wild boar)
- Dama dama ssp. (fallow deer)
- Cervus elaphus ssp. (red deer)
- Praemegaceros verticornis ? (Dawkins) (a genus of large deer – see Megaloceros verticornis)
- Capra ibex macedonica Sickenberg (a subspecies of alpine ibex)
- Bison schoetensacki (Freudenberg) (European woodland bison)
