= Mount Itamos =

Mountain range in Sithonia, Greece

Itamos
- Ίταμος
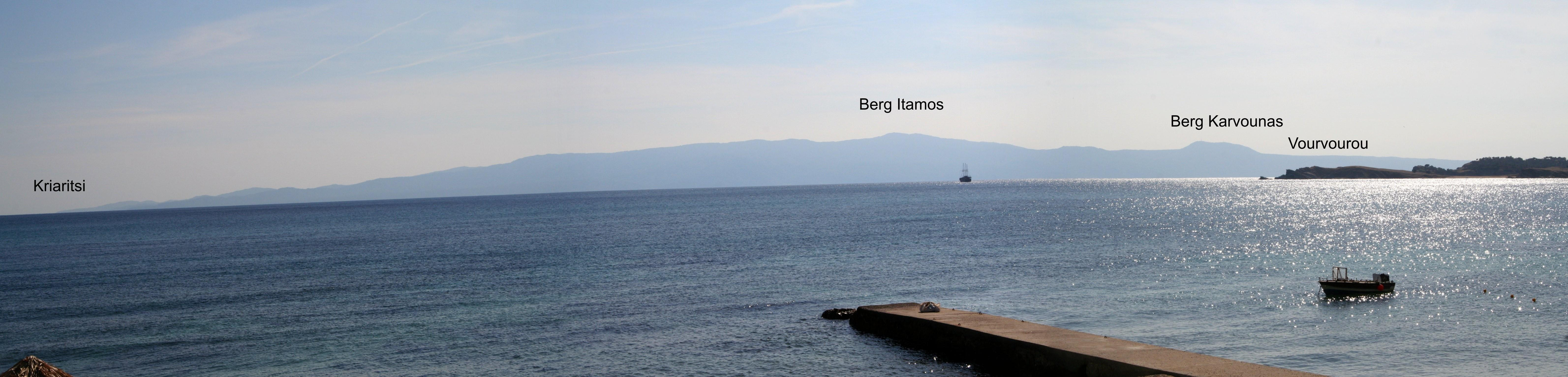
- View from Ouranoupoli: a panorama of the Sithonia peninsula with the Itamos mountain range. North of the summit of Itamos (about 800 m), Karvounas peak (about 560 m) can be seen.

Highest point
- Peak: Itamos
- Elevation: 817 m (2,680 ft)
- Coordinates: 40°7′N 23°51′E

Geography
- Location: Sithonia
- Country: Greece

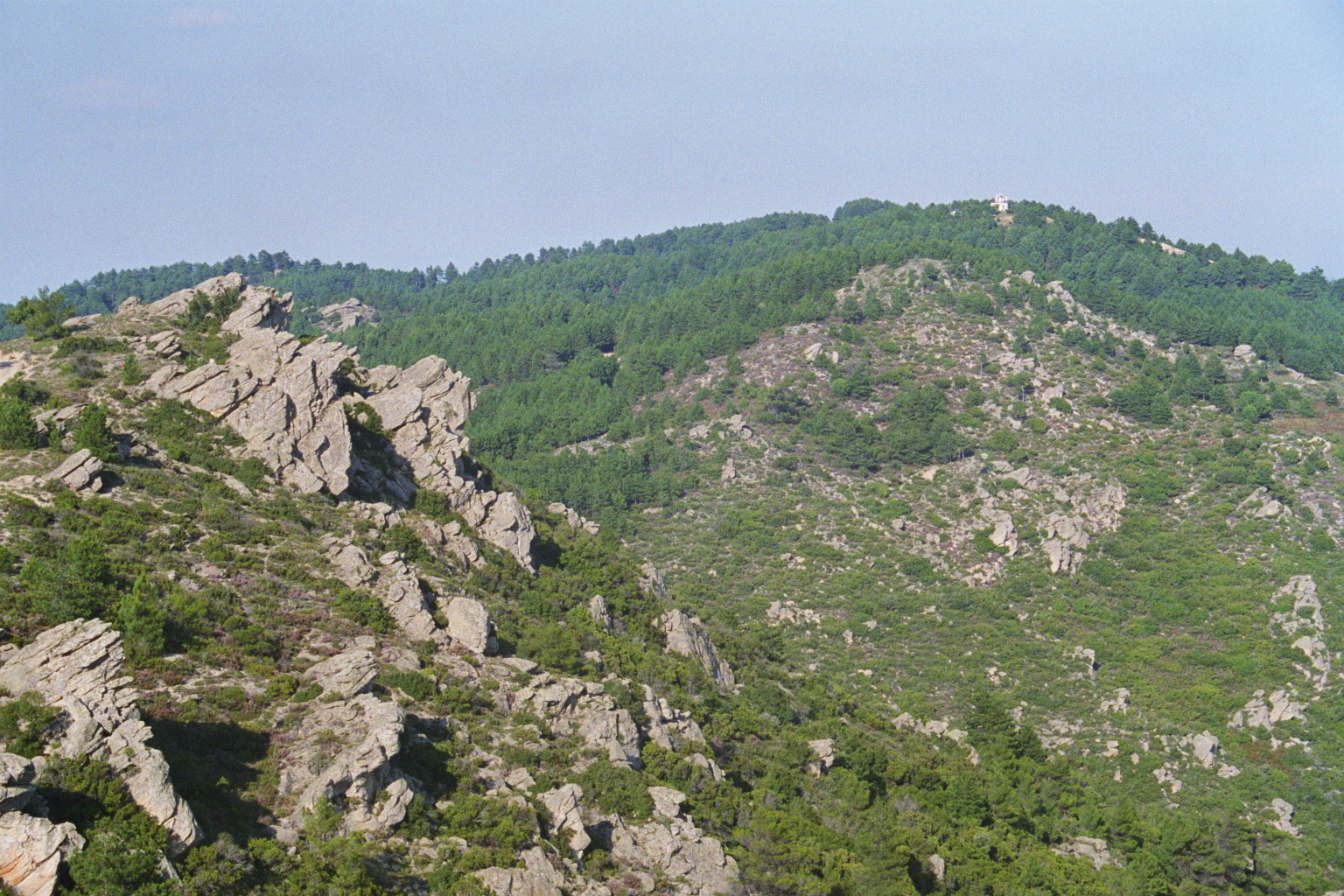
The summit of Mount Itamos. The tower-like structure on the summit is commonly called the Fire Watchtower, since it is used to look out for fires that are common especially during the summer.

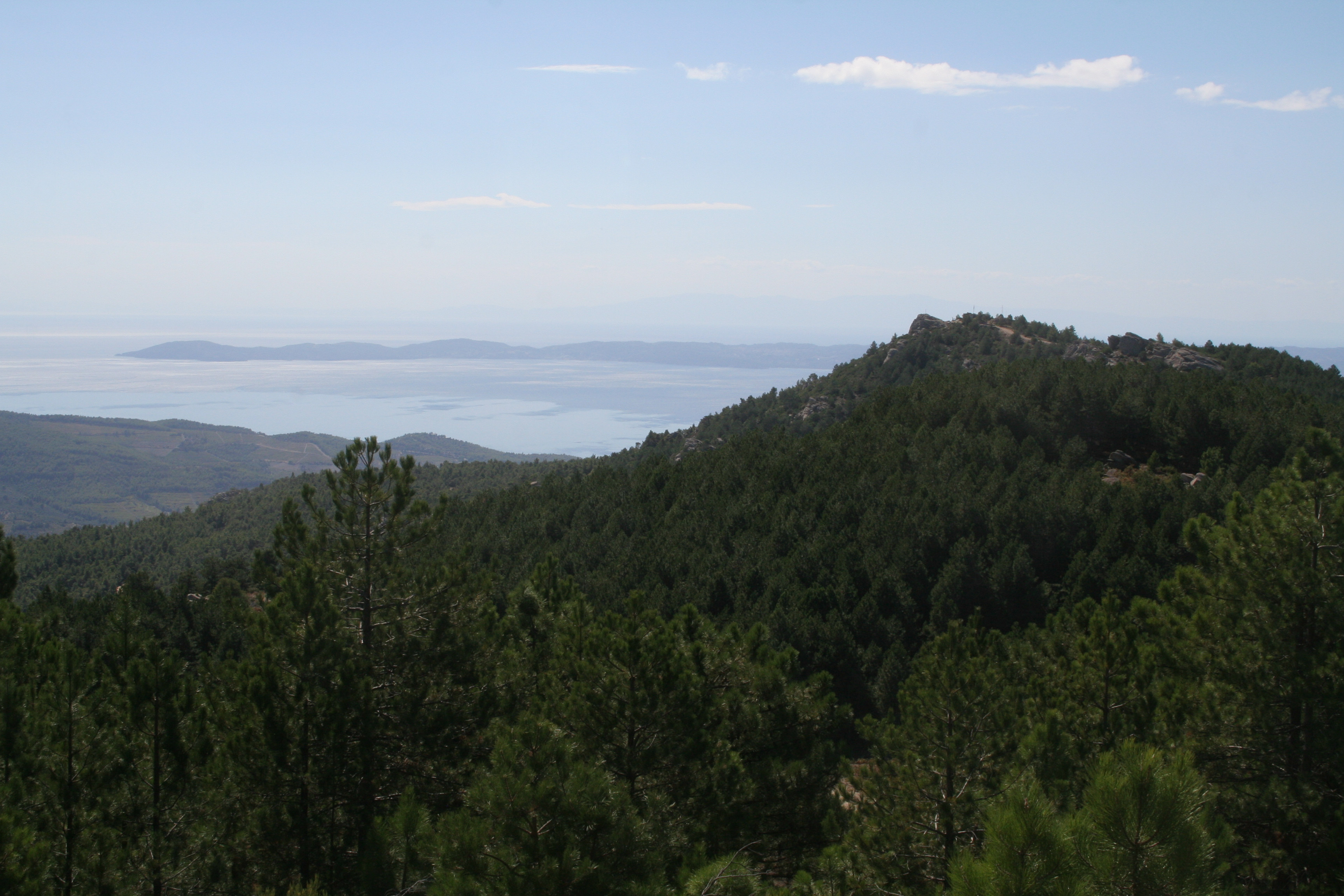
View of Mount Astrapokameno. Behind it is the southern tip of Kassandra. View from Mount Itamos.

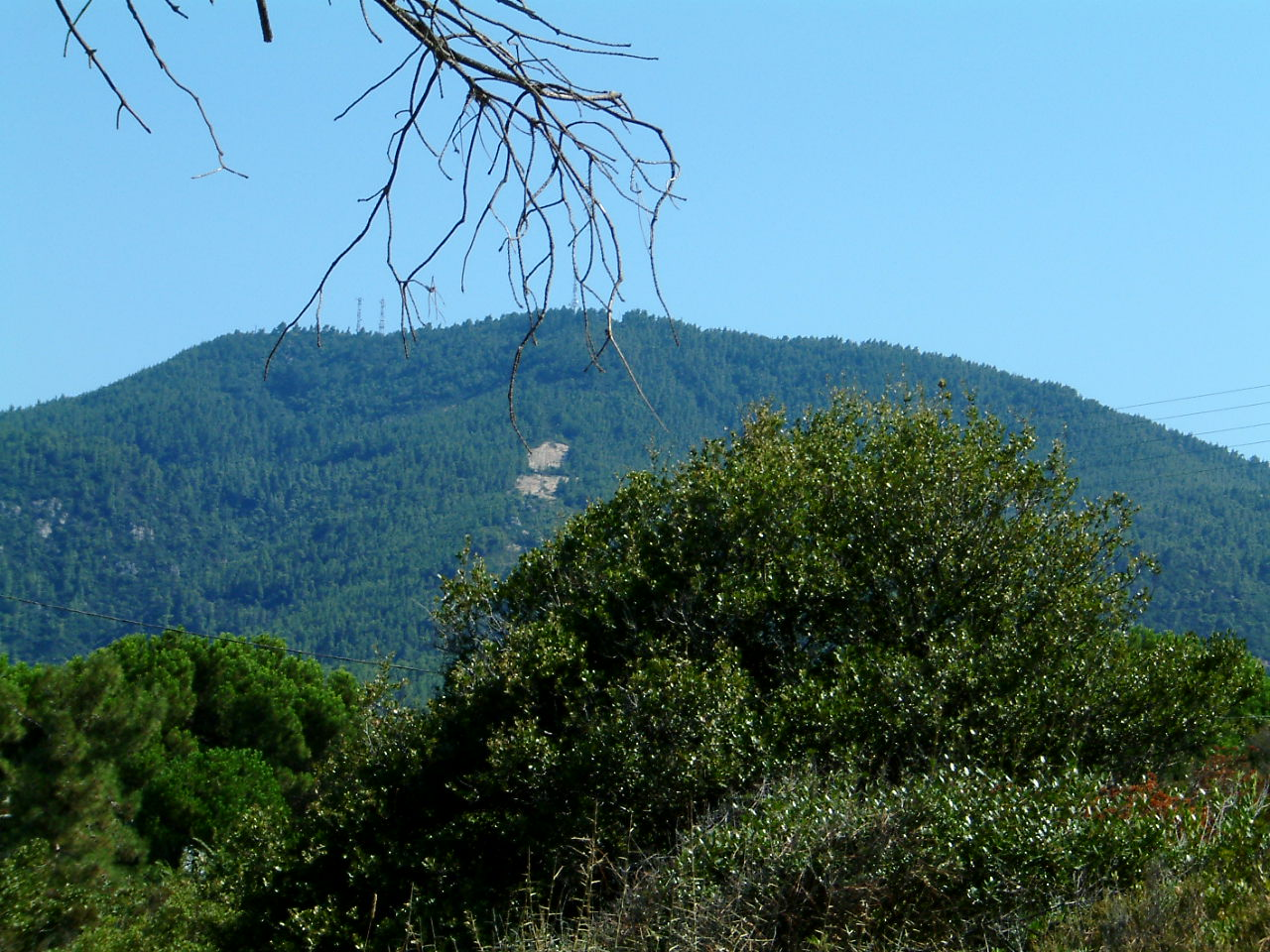
Mount Karvounas, Vourvourou, Chalkidiki

Mount Itamos (Greek: Ίταμος) is a mountain range in Chalkidiki, northern Greece. It stretches across the Sithonia peninsula (the "second" or "middle finger" of Chalkidiki) in the middle from north to south.

== Peaks ==
The peaks of Mount Itamos are:

- Itamos, 817 m, 40°7′N 23°51′E, east of Parthenonas
- Astrapokameno, 808 m, 40°7′N 23°51′E, east of Parthenonas
- Psilos, 753 m, 40°7′N 23°53′E, east of Parthenonas
- Dragoudeli, 689 m, 40°6′N 23°55′E, west of Sarti
- Paklara, 598 m, 40°5′N 23°55′E, west of Sarti
- Karvounas, 567 m, 40°10′N 23°49′E, southeast of Vourvourou
- Melitonas, 468 m, 40°4′N 23°50′E, southeast of Porto Carras
- Trapezi, 366 m, 40°4′N 23°58′E, south of Sarti
- Petrus Rock, 298 m, 40°9′N 23°45′E, southeast of Nikiti

== Description ==
The area of the mountain range is about 27,000 hectares (270 square kilometres). Land use is about 70% forestry, 30% agriculture, 10% tourism/recreation. Most of the land is located within the Oros Itamos - Sithonia Protected Area.

The mountain range is predominantly covered by conifer forests. Forest fires have destroyed large areas of forests in the south of Sithonia around Sarti and Sykia, and in September 2004, east of Neos Marmaras. To protect against the spread of forest fires, wide corridors have been created.

The mountain range has many dirt roads that are popular with mountain bikers. During the winter, many of the roads can become muddy due to frequent rainstorms.

Approximately in the middle of the mountain range, a road stretches from Nikiti to Sykia, from which numerous winding roads lead to the island's main road. Settlements are located on the coast due to the ruggedness of the central mountain range; only Sykia is about 4 km inland. The only higher settlement is the mountain village of Parthenonas, which can be reached from Neos Marmaras by an asphalt road.

In the mountainous area, animal husbandry (primarily goat herding) and beekeeping (numerous beehives) are practiced. In the foothills of the mountain range, wine is grown near Porto Carras.

== Gallery ==
Views from Mount Itamos

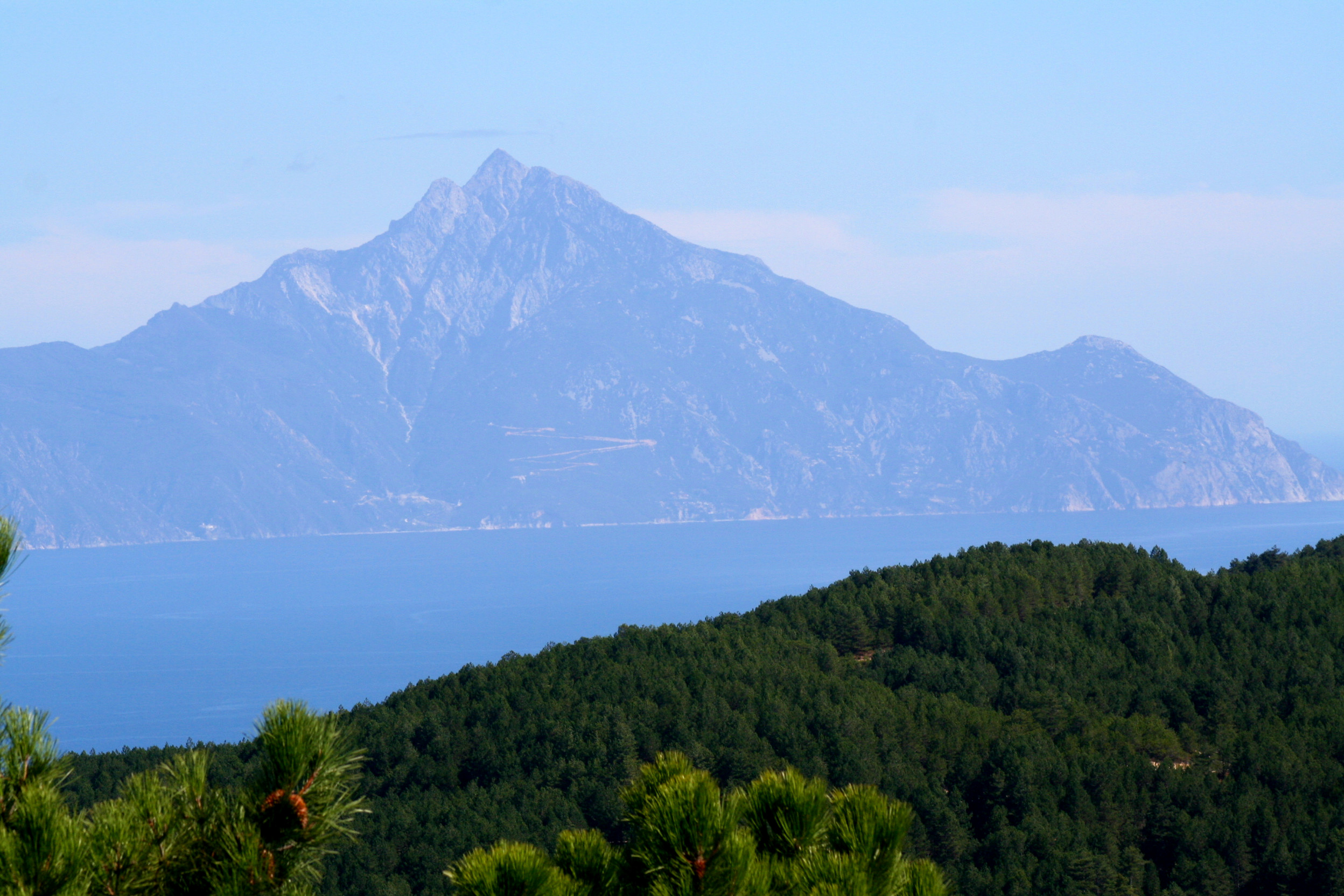
View of Mount Athos from Mount Itamos

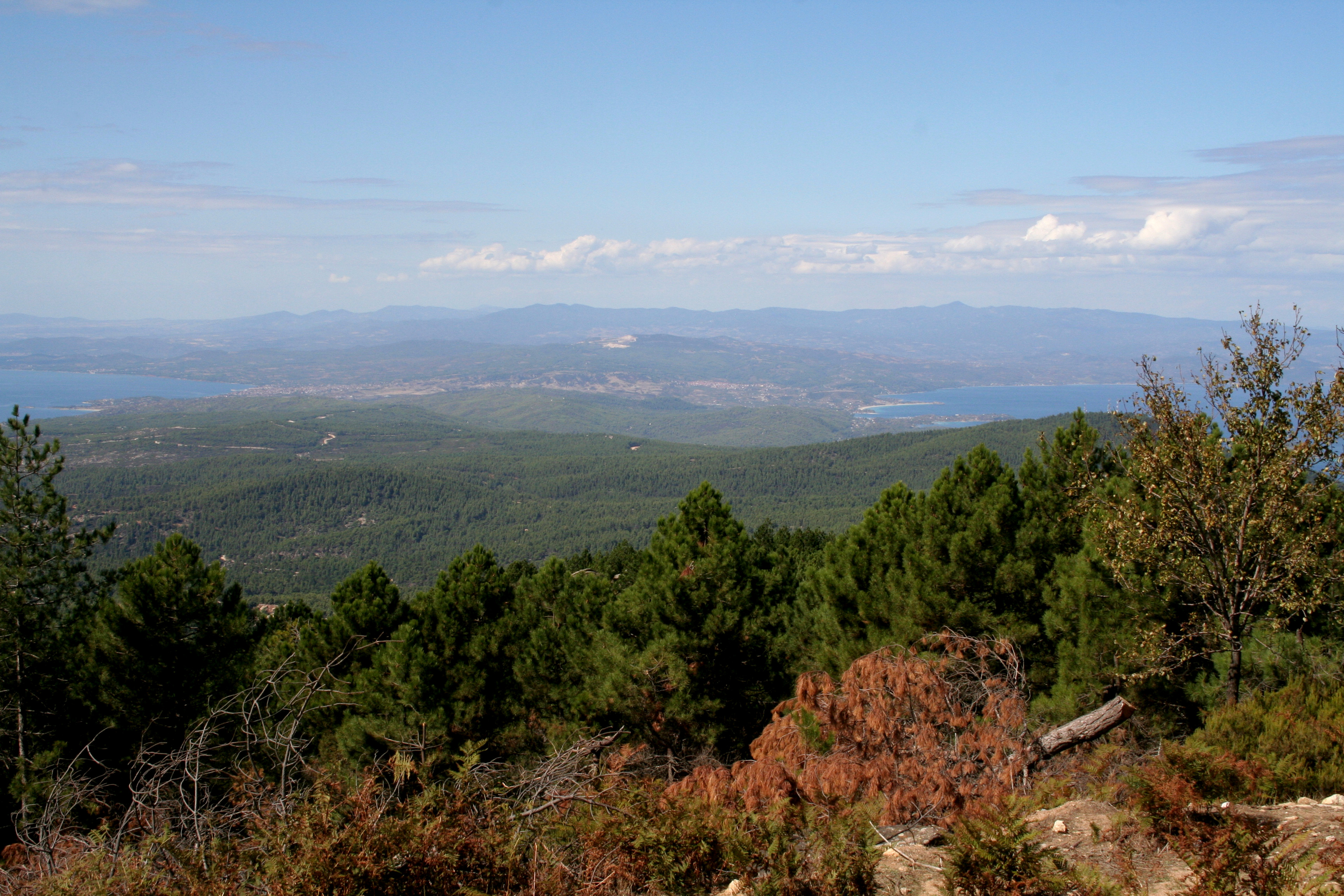
View towards Nikiti (left in the picture) and Agios Nikolaos, Chalkidiki (right in the picture)

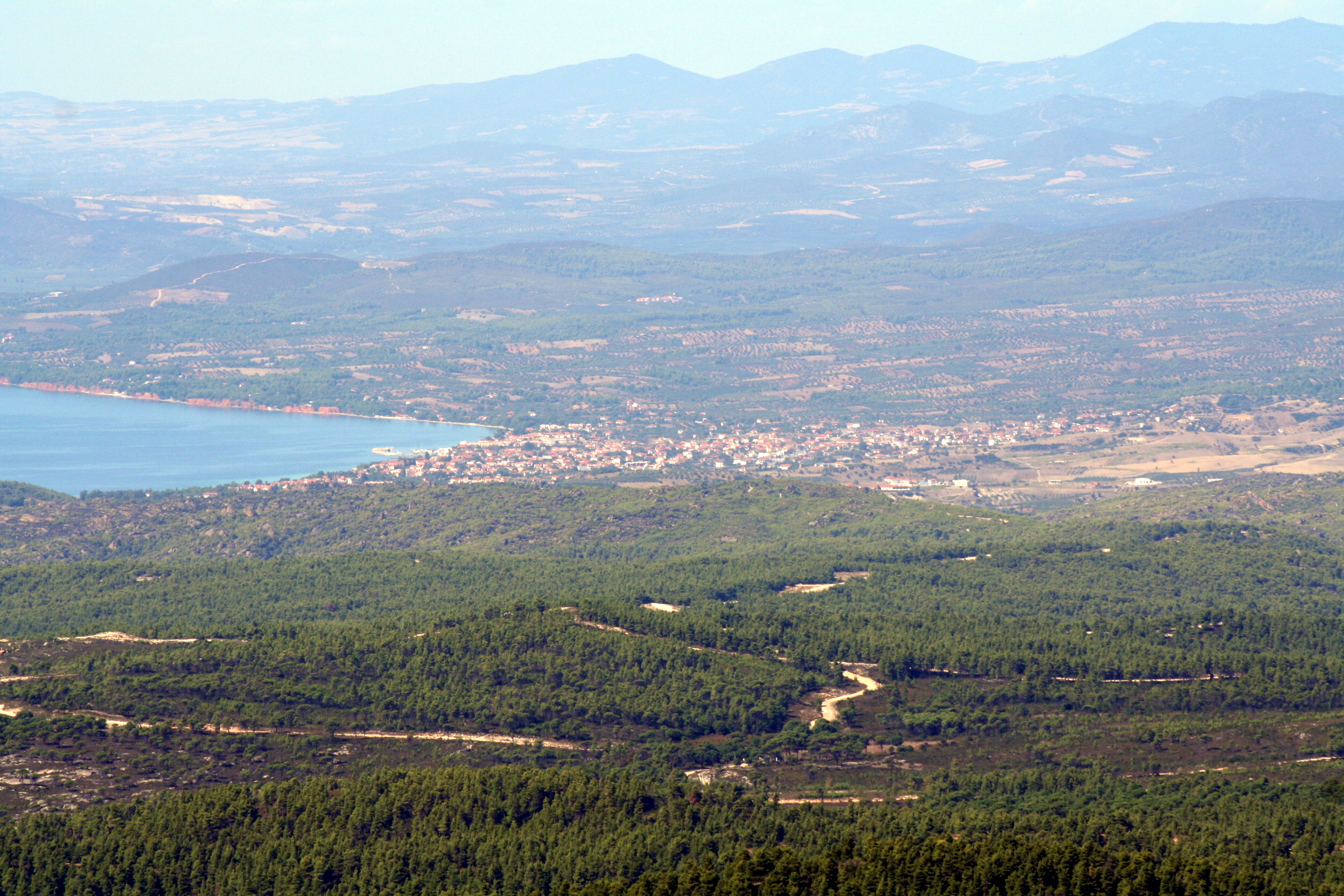
View in the direction of Nikiti

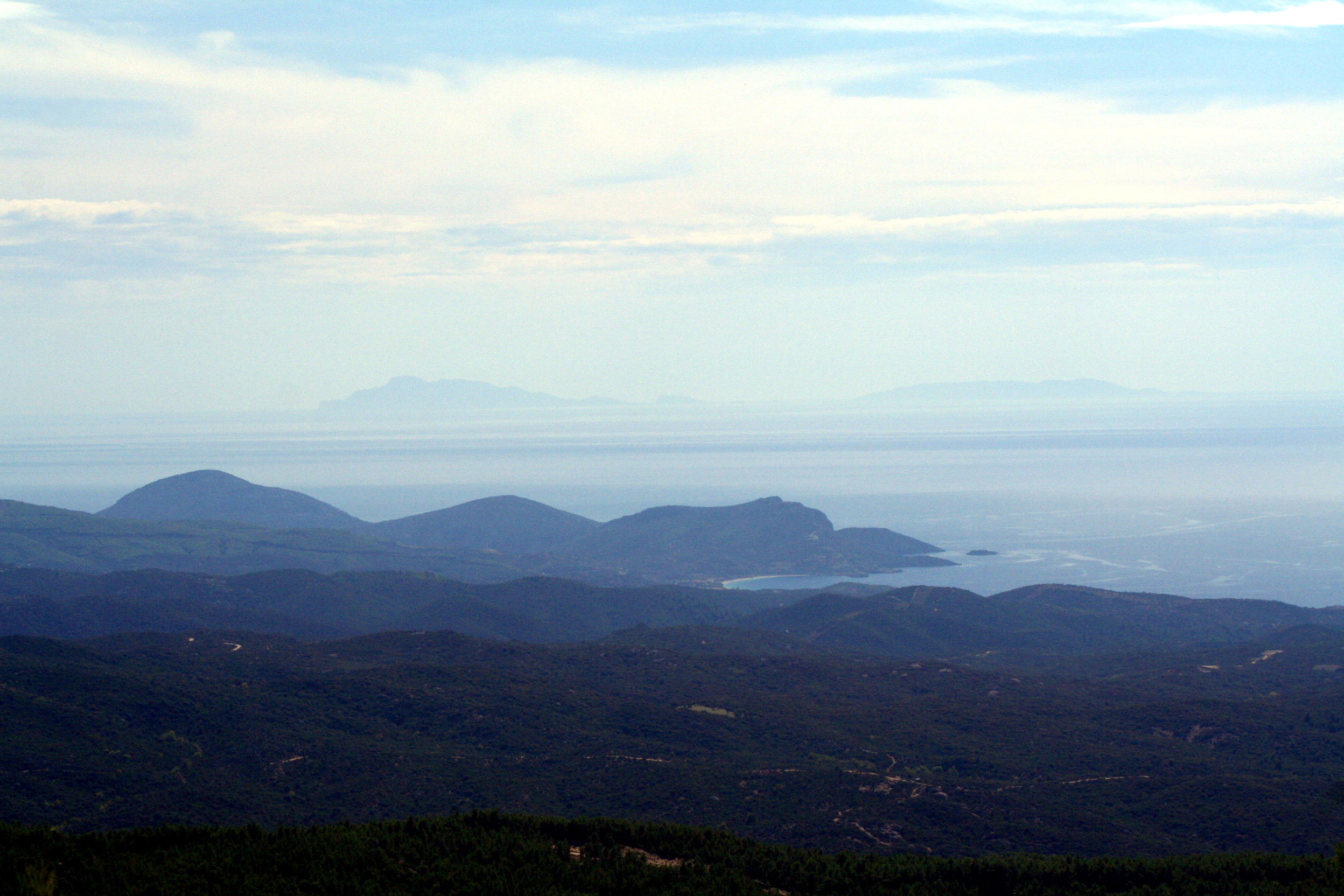
View towards the Toronean Gulf. The northern Sporades are visible on the horizon.
