= Vourvourou =

Vourvourou Βουρβουρού
- Settlement
- Location within Greece
- Coordinates: 40°10′43″N 23°47′57″E
- Country: Greece
- Administrative region: Central Macedonia
- Regional unit: Chalkidiki
- Municipality: Sithonia
- Time zone: UTC+2 (EET)
  - Summer (DST): UTC+3 (EEST)
- Postal code: 63078

Vourvourou (Greek: Βουρβουρού) is a village near Agios Nikolaos, in the Chalkidiki peninsula of northern Greece. It is best known as a holiday destination.

== History ==
The area has been inhabited since ancient times, containing ruins of the pre-Byzantine church of Agios Andreas found on the island of Diaporos. There is also a large wall from an unknown era that cut communication between Sithonia and the rest of Chalkidiki.

In the 10th century, the area was known as the "land of the Vourvourioi", and was granted to the Xenophontos monastery of Mount Athos. In the 1615, the people of Agios Nikolaos acquired the land, but at the end of the 19th century the monks of Simonopetra monastery sold it to Russian monks, with the result that the latter were forcibly driven away by the local inhabitants.

During the 1960s the teaching staff of the University of Thessaloniki developed a holiday resort in a private area also known as Vourvourou. Designed by Professor Thales Argyropoulos it has become well known for its environment-friendly design and respect for the natural surroundings and has become one of the most prestigious resorts of its kind in Greece.

== Geography ==
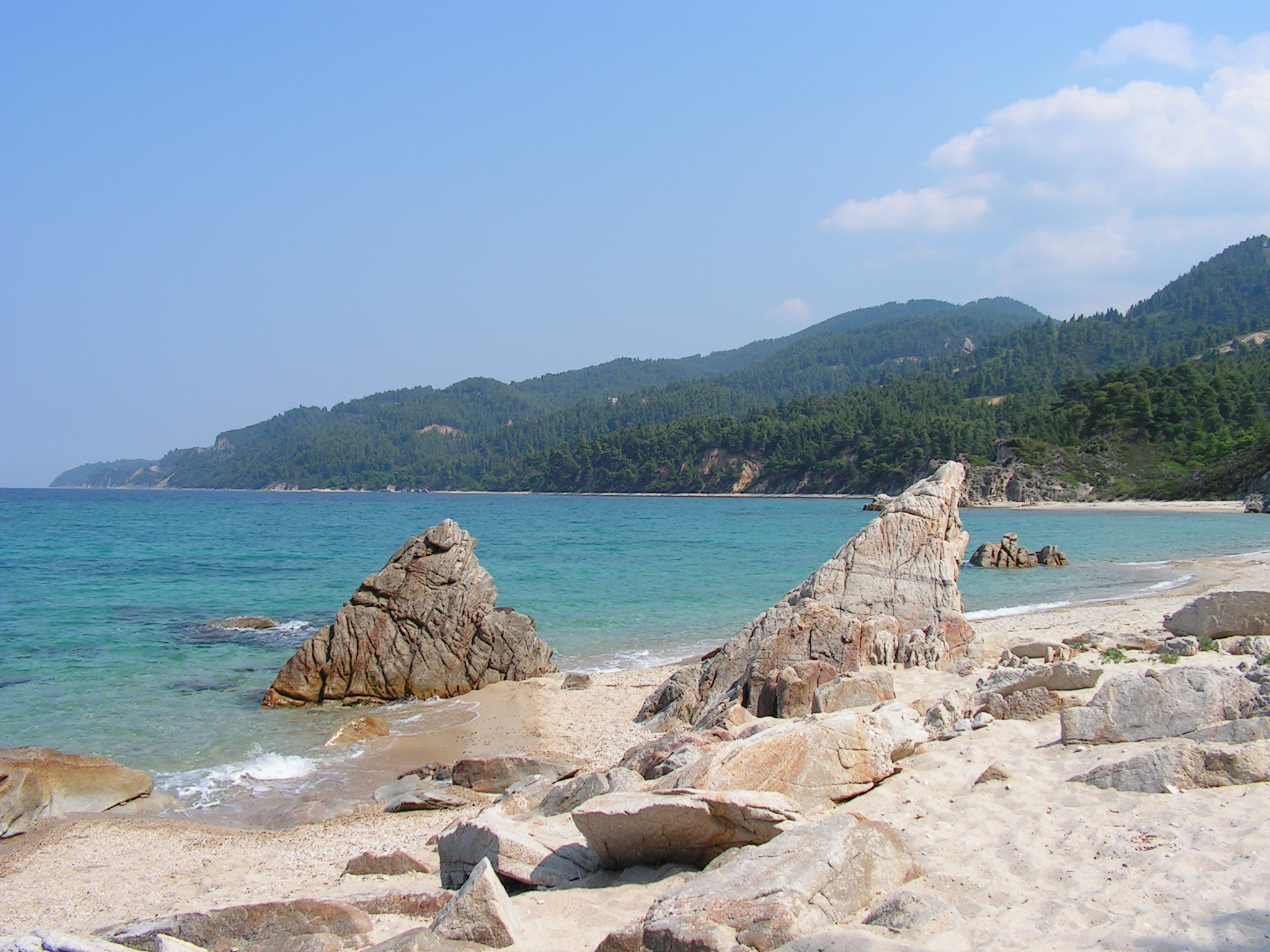
A beach in Vourvourou

Vourvourou is situated 51 kilometres (32 mi) southeast of Poligiros on the eastern side of Sithonia peninsula, between the villages of Ormos Panagia and Sarti. The area contains numerous sandy beaches, small rock islands and caves. Mount Itamos is in the vicinity.

The settlement of Aristotle University of Thessaloniki teaching staff is visible as a symbol for environmental respect. In 2001, a monument was erected in Zografou for three pilots who died in a 1995 aircraft collision.
