= Elia (Nikiti) =

Elia Ελιά
- Settlement
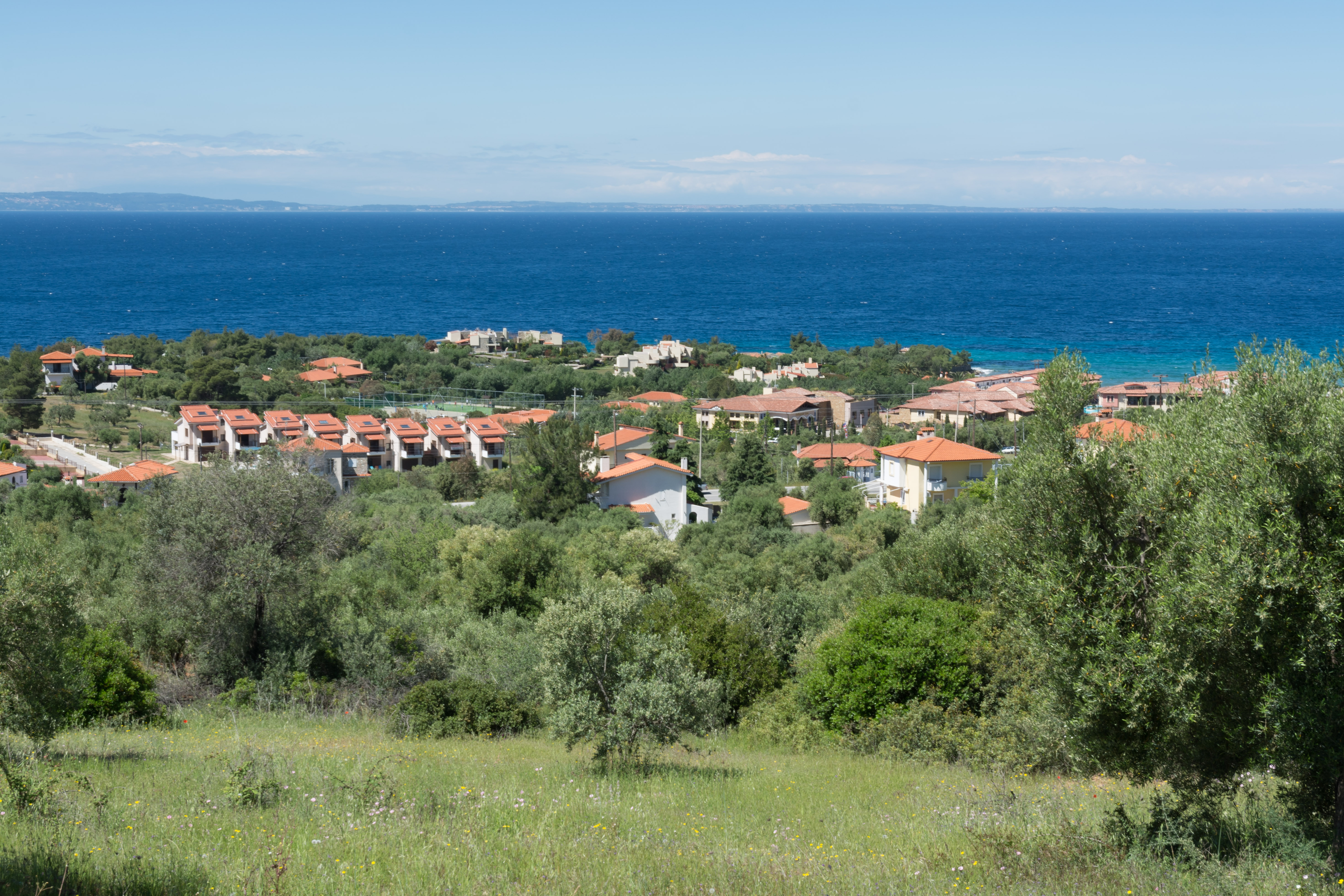

- Location within Greece
- Coordinates: 40°08′42″N 23°44′13″E
- Country: Greece
- Administrative region: Central Macedonia
- Regional unit: Chalkidiki
- Municipality: Sithonia
- Municipal unit: Sithonia
- Community: Nikiti
- Elevation: 0 m (0 ft)

Population (2021)
  - Total: 77
- Time zone: UTC+2 (EET)
  - Summer (DST): UTC+3 (EEST)
- Area code: 23750
- Vehicle registration: XK

Elia is a Greek village in Sithonia, on the Chalkidiki peninsula in Central Macedonia. The village is located 12 kilometers from the ancient settlement of Nikiti and the resort town of Neos Marmaras. Elia dates back to the Byzantine period.

This region, with its many beachside hotels, is a popular summer tourist destination.
