= PKF =

PKF may refer to:

- Pakistan Korfball Federation
- PKF, IATA code for Park Falls Municipal Airport, Park Falls, Wisconsin, US
- Paul Karl Feyerabend (1924–1994), Austrian-American philosopher
- Peace keeping force
- Percy Keese Fitzhugh (1876–1950), American author
- PKF International, a network of accounting firms
- PKF Karate:
  - Panamerican Karate Federation, governing body of karate in the Americas
  - Philippine Karatedo Federation, governing body of karate in the Philippines
- Polska Kronika Filmowa, Polish Film Chronicle, cinema newsreel
- Pollock-Krasner Foundation
- Porto Koufo, the deepest natural harbour in Greece
