= Sarti, Chalkidiki =

Village in Chalkidiki, Greece

Sarti Σάρτη
- Community
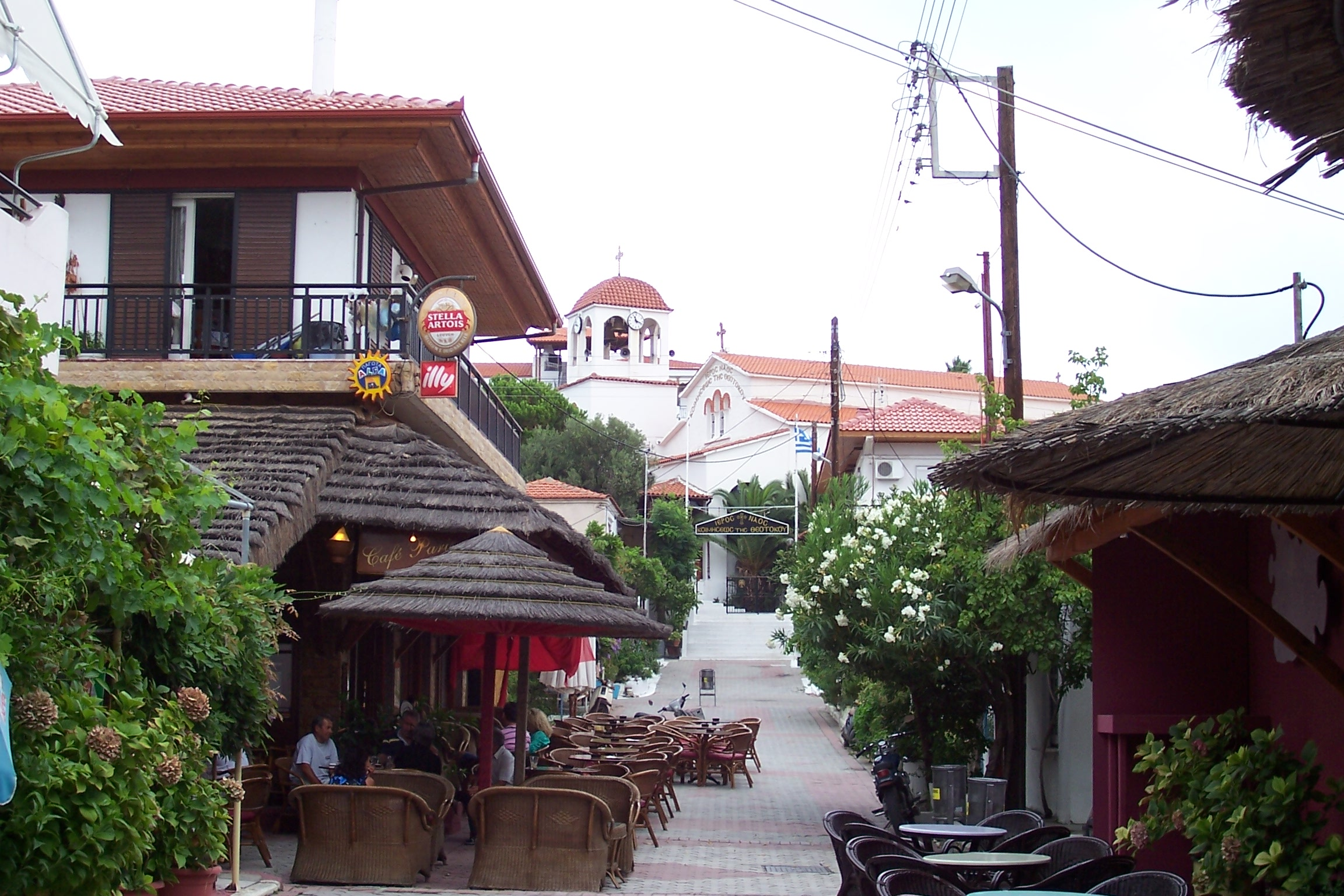
- Street in Sarti

- Location within Greece
- Coordinates: 40°05′53″N 23°58′45″E
- Country: Greece
- Administrative region: Central Macedonia
- Regional unit: Chalkidiki
- Municipality: Sithonia
- Municipal unit: Toroni

Population (2021)
  - Community: 1,054
- Time zone: UTC+2 (EET)
  - Summer (DST): UTC+3 (EEST)
- Vehicle registration: XK

Sarti (Greek: Σάρτη, Sárti) is a village in the municipality of Sithonia, on the Sithonia peninsula in Chalkidiki, Greece. According to the 2021 Greek census, it had a population of 1,054.

The name derives from the nearby ancient settlement of Sarta. The modern village was established after 1922 by Greek refugees from the island of Afissia (present-day Avşa Island off the coast of Anatolia) following the Greco-Turkish War and the subsequent population exchange between Greece and Turkey.

The village developed gradually over the 20th century, with local residents engaging mainly in fishing and agriculture before tourism became the main source of income.

Today, Sarti is a popular tourist destination, particularly during the summer months when visitors are attracted to its beaches. It is also one of the starting points for hiking on Mount Itamos. Mount Athos is visible from the village’s beaches and from the surrounding hills. Sarti is located on the northeastern coast of Sithonia, with hills surrounding the village that offer panoramic views of the peninsula and the Aegean Sea. Apart from beaches and hiking, small family-run taverns, local crafts, and seaside accommodations contribute significantly to the local economy.
