= Metagkitsi =

Metagkitsi Μεταγκίτσι
- Community
- Location within Greece
- Coordinates: 40°19′28″N 23°29′18″E
- Country: Greece
- Administrative region: Central Macedonia
- Regional unit: Chalkidiki
- Municipality: Sithonia
- Municipal unit: Sithonia
- Elevation: 140 m (460 ft)

Population (2021)
  - Community: 825
- Time zone: UTC+2 (EET)
  - Summer (DST): UTC+3 (EEST)
- Postal code: 630 78
- Area code: 23750
- Vehicle registration: XK

Metagkitsi (Greek: Μεταγκίτσι) is a village on the Chalkidiki peninsula in Macedonia, Greece.
