= Diaporos Island =

Island in the Aegean Sea, Greece

Diaporos
Native name: Διάπορος
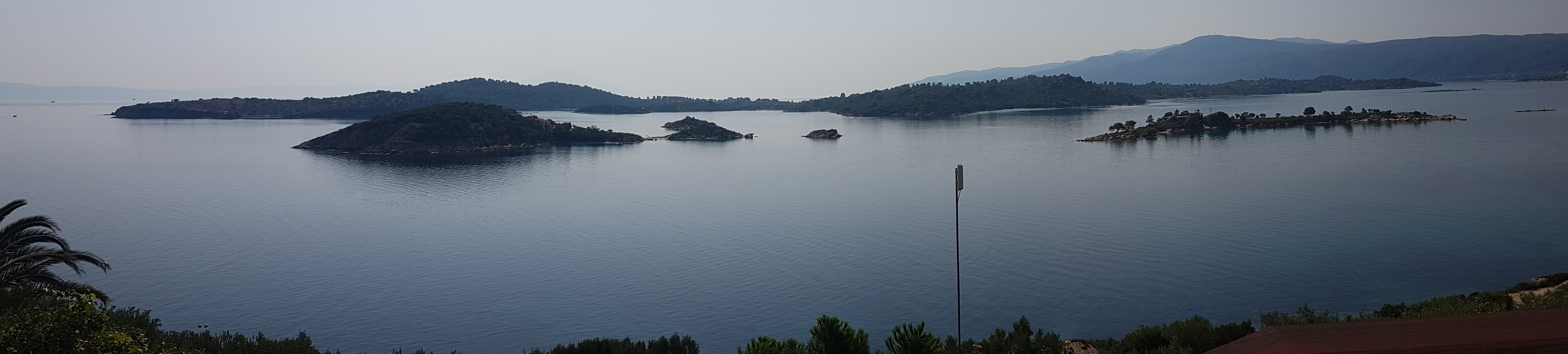
- Interactive map of Diaporos

Geography
- Location: Singitic Gulf
- Coordinates: 40°12′32″N 23°46′34″E
- Archipelago: Chalkidiki
- Area: 4 km^{2} (1.5 sq mi)

Administration
- Greece
- Region: Central Macedonia
- Regional unit: Chalkidiki
- Municipality: Sithonia

Demographics
- Population: 0 (2021)

Diaporos (Greek: Διάπορος) is an island in the Singitic Gulf off the eastern coast of Sithonia in Chalkidiki, northern Greece. The island has an area of approximately 4 km² and is the largest island in a small group of islets located opposite the village of Agios Nikolaos.

The island has no permanent population according to the 2021 Greek census.

== Geography ==
Diaporos lies in the Singitic Gulf along the eastern coast of Sithonia in Chalkidiki. The island is characterized by pine forests, rocky shores and small sheltered coves with clear turquoise waters.

Several small bays and beaches are located around the island. Among the best known are Galana Nera and Myrsini Beach, often referred to as the “Hawaii of Sithonia” due to its shallow turquoise waters.

A number of smaller islets lie near Diaporos, including Peristeri and Elia.

== Tourism ==
Although the island has no permanent residents, it is a popular destination for boat excursions from Sithonia and nearby coastal settlements. During the summer months many visitors arrive by private boats and organized tours to swim in the shallow waters around the island.

Tourist development on the island remains limited and most of the buildings consist of private holiday homes.
