= Sithonia =

Sithonia Σιθωνία
- Municipality
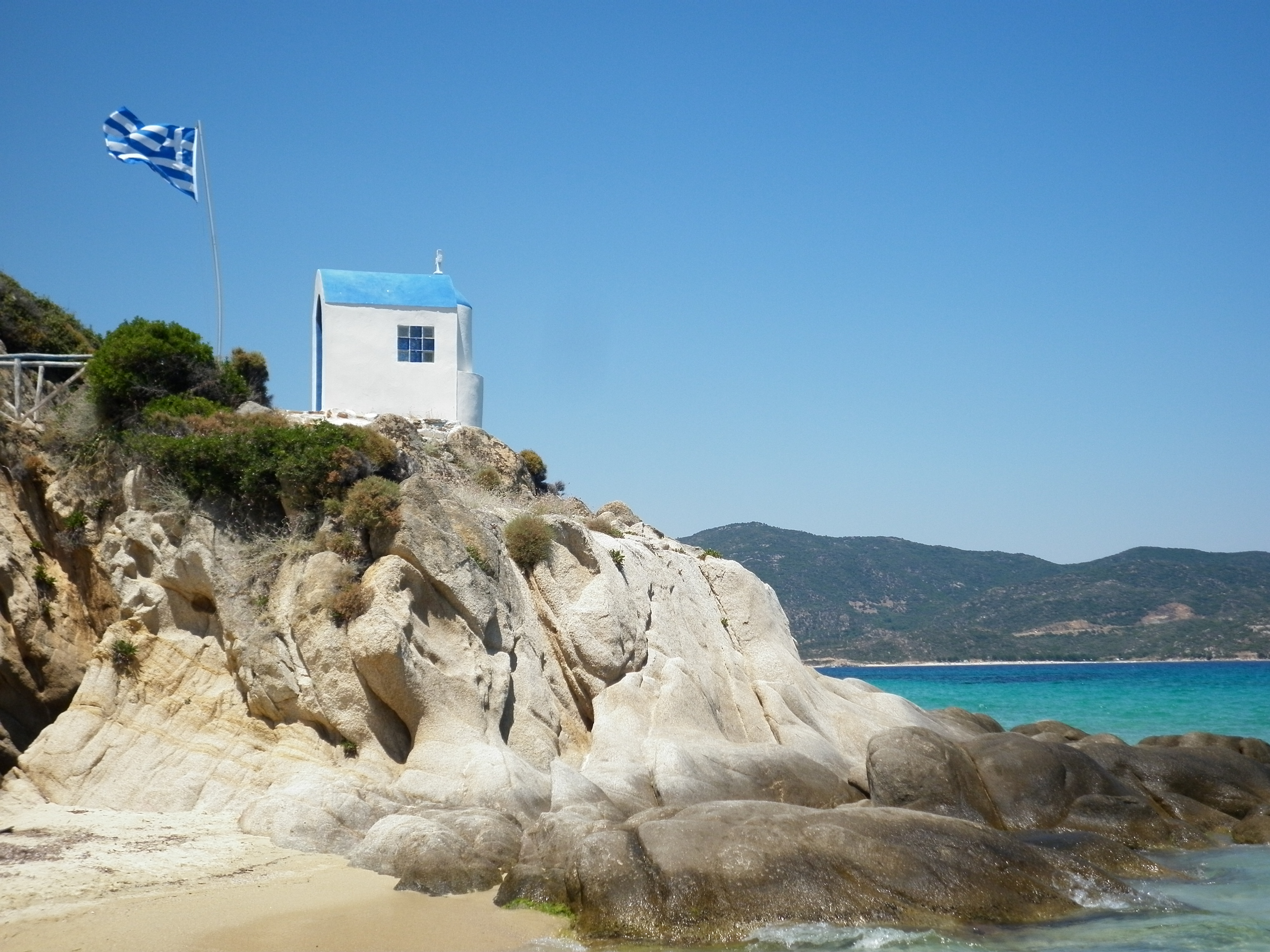
- Klimataria beach

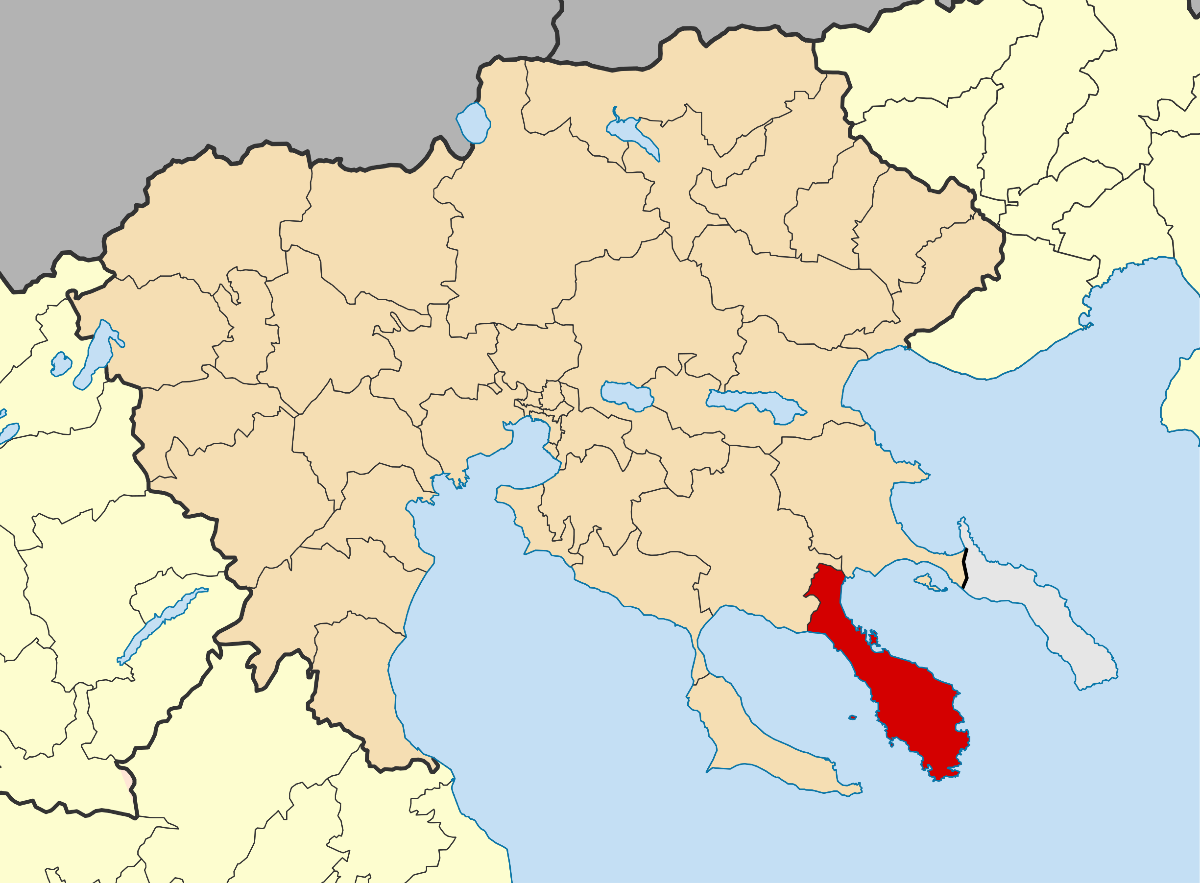

- Location within Greece
- Coordinates: 40°06′00″N 23°52′30″E
- Country: Greece
- Administrative region: Central Macedonia
- Regional unit: Chalkidiki
- Seat: Nikiti

Government
  - Mayor: Ioannis Mallinis (since 2023)

Area
  - Municipality: 516.8 km^{2} (199.5 sq mi)
  - Municipal unit: 322.9 km^{2} (124.7 sq mi)

Population (2021)
  - Municipality: 12,080
  - Density: 23.37/km^{2} (60.54/sq mi)
  - Municipal unit: 8,750
  - Municipal unit density: 27.1/km^{2} (70.2/sq mi)
- Time zone: UTC+2 (EET)
  - Summer (DST): UTC+3 (EEST)
- Vehicle registration: ΧΚ

Sithonia (Greek: Σιθωνία), also known as Longos, is a peninsula and part of the larger peninsula of Chalkidiki in Greece. The Kassandra Peninsula lies to the west of Sithonia and the Mount Athos peninsula to the east. Sithonia is also the name of a municipality, covering the Sithonia Peninsula. The seat of the municipality is the town Nikiti.

== Geography ==
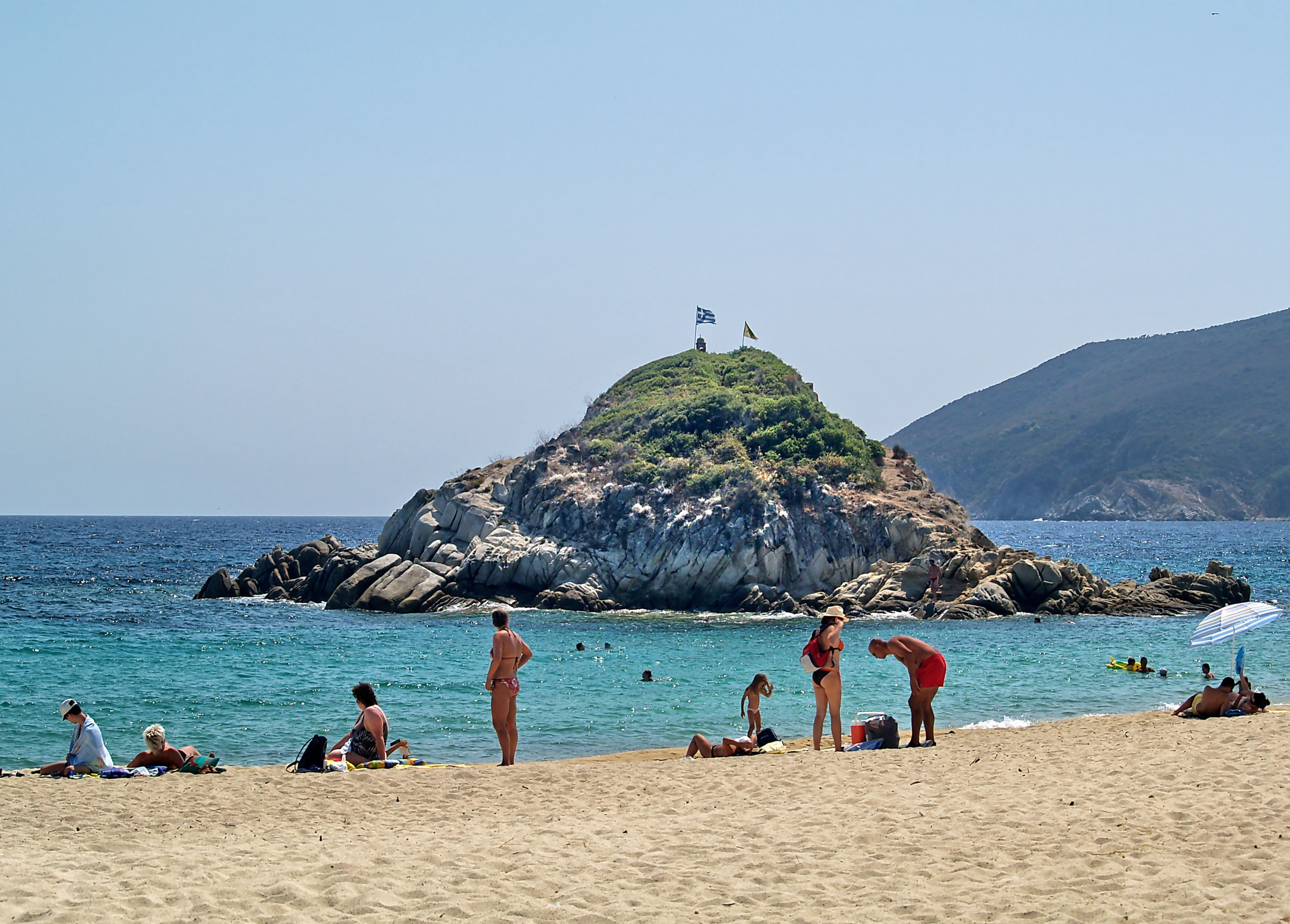
Sithonia, beach of Kalamitsi

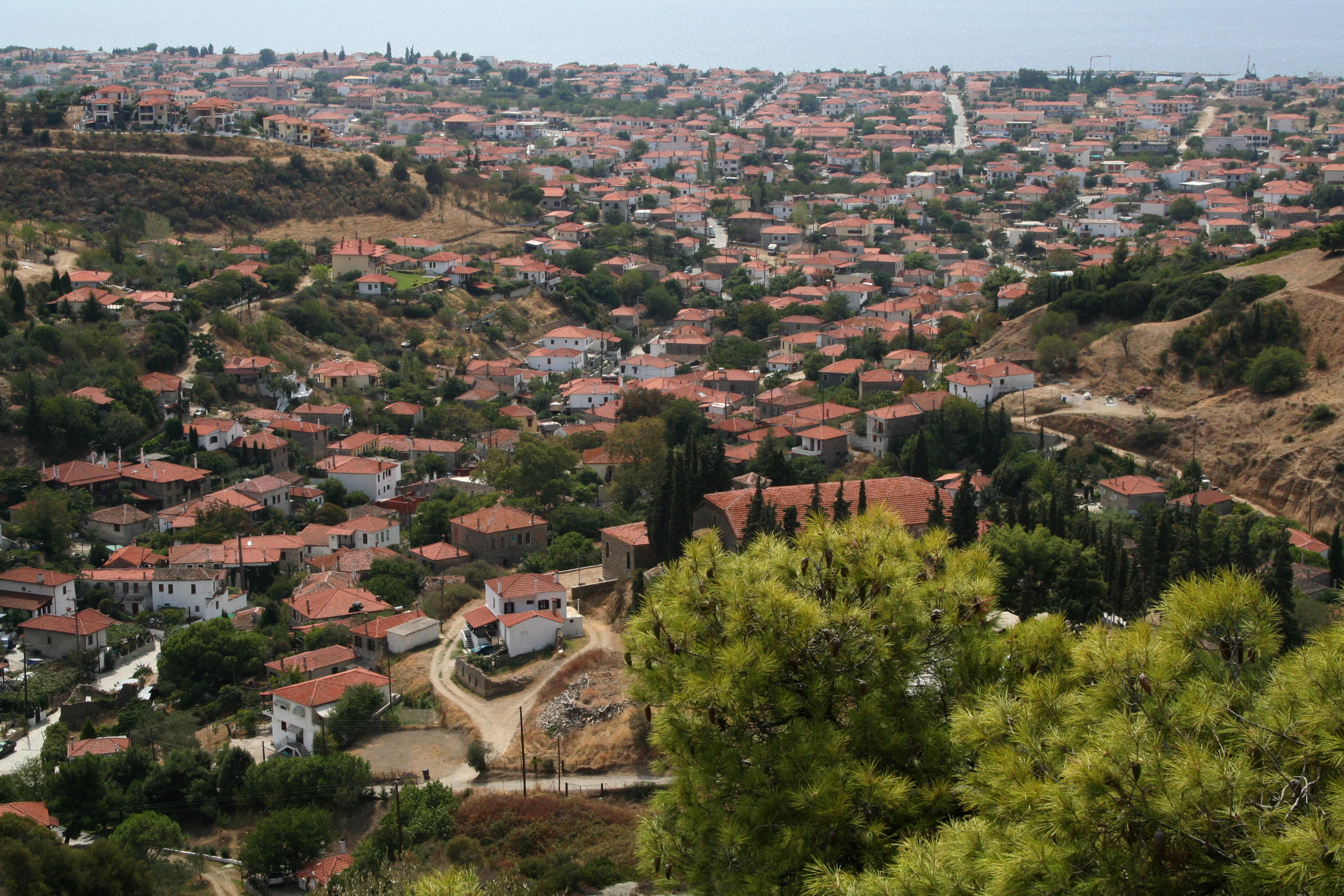
Panorama of Nikiti

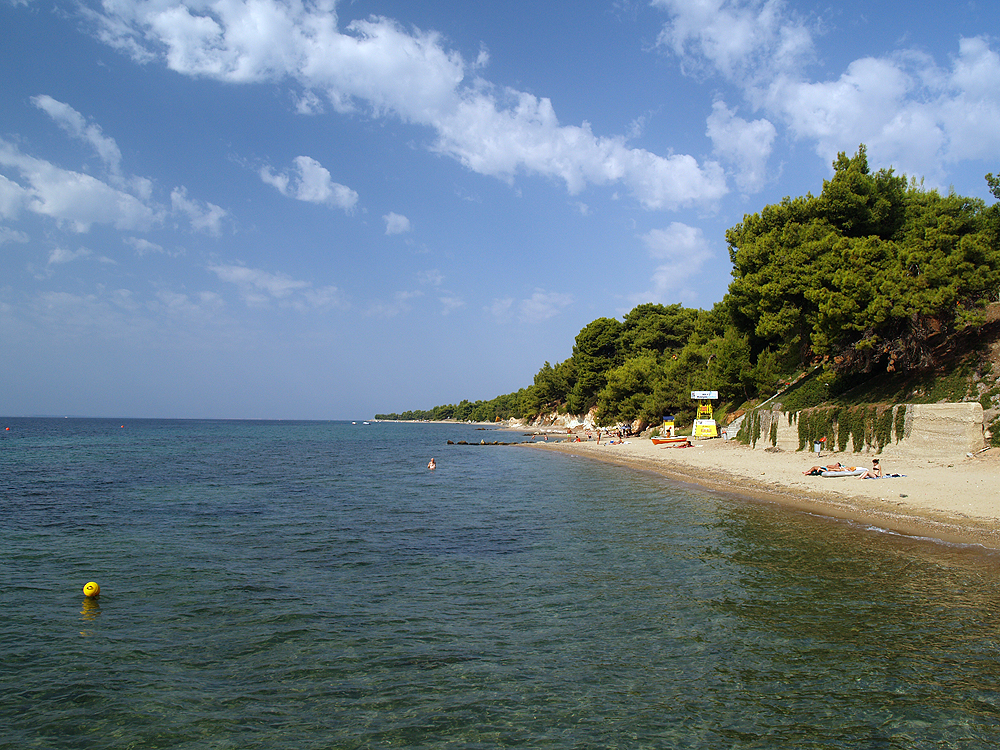
Elia Beach

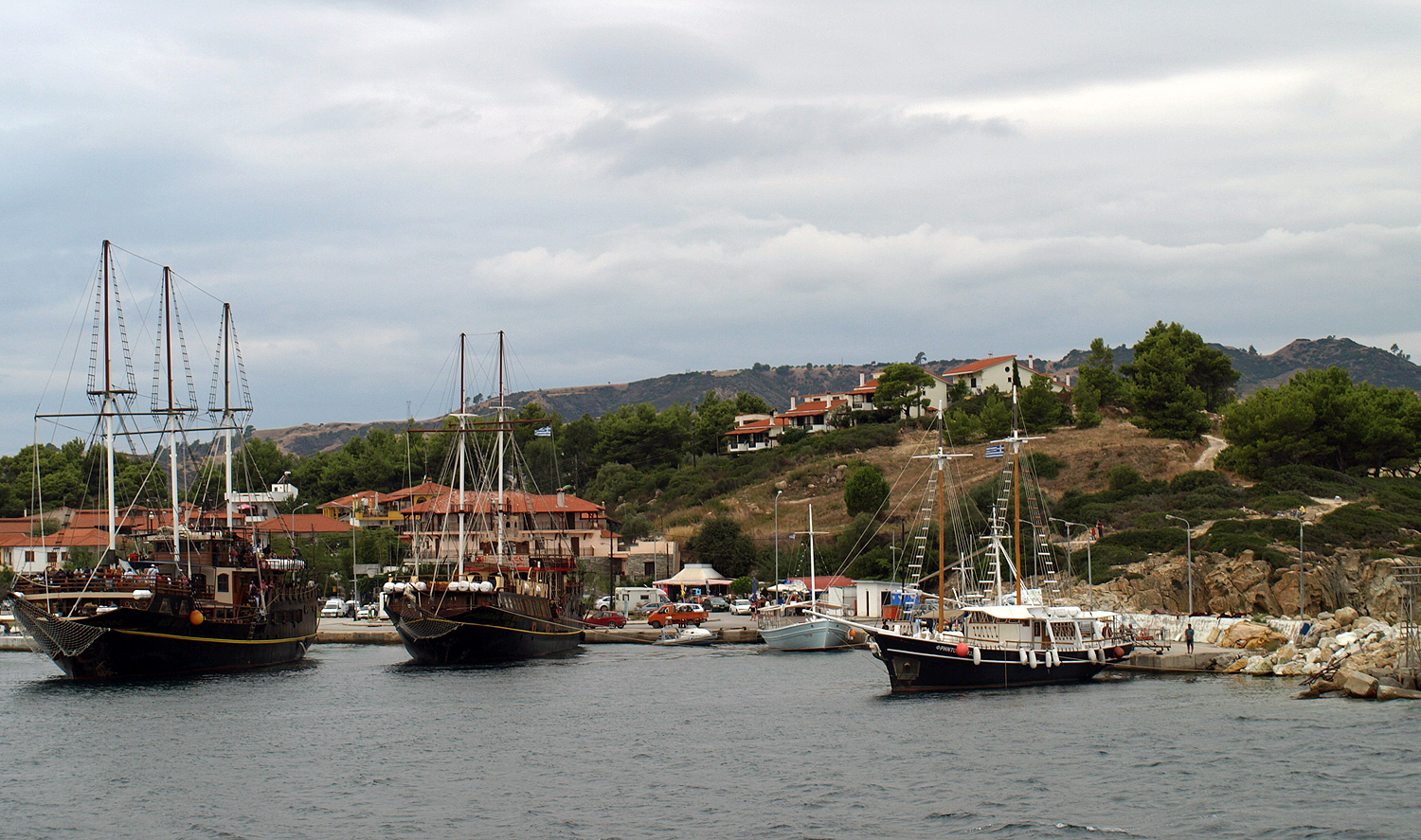
Ormos Panagias

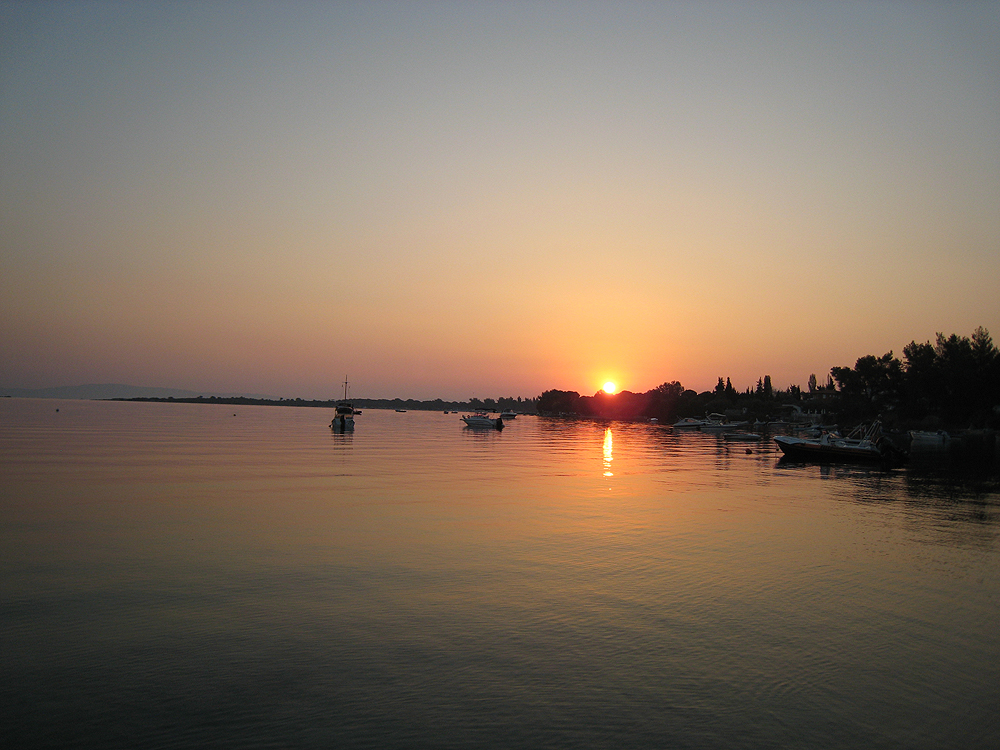
Sunrise in Vourvourou

Gulfs that surround the peninsula are the Singitic Gulf to the east and the Toronean Gulf to the west. The peaks of Itamos and Dragoudelis are in the center of the peninsula. The landscape is covered with vineyards, forests, grasslands, shrubland and mountains. Amongst the many historic places in Sithonia is the ancient city, the castle and the church of Agios Athanasios in Toroni, the windmills in Sykia and the 16th century church in Nikiti.

In the northern part of the peninsula are the popular beaches of Ai Giannis, Kalogria, Elia and Lagomandra on the west coast and Livrochios, Karidi, Kavourotripes and Platanitsi on the east coast. The beaches in the southern part include Azapiko, Tristinika, Kalamitsi and Kriaritsi.

Porto Koufo, is the largest natural harbor in Greece, which is mentioned by Thucydides as "hollow harbor"; it appears to be the fishing spot in the area. South, from the harbour's exit there is Kartalia, the most southern part of Sithonia, a very impressive area which puts its visitors under a spell with its rocky secluded beaches.

The main villages in the peninsula are Nikiti, Neos Marmaras, Parthenonas, Sarti, Sykia, Vourvourou and Agios Nikolaos.

In the middle of Sithonia peninsula, near the village of Neos Marmaras, is the holiday resort of Porto Carras; the place of the 2003 European Union leaders Summit. In summer the waterfront areas of Neos Maramaras, Nikiti and Sarti are especially busy.

Mount Itamos rising to 817 m (2,680 ft) in the centre of the peninsula, is the highest peak. Islands lying off the coast of Sithonia include Kelyfos (to the west) and Diaporos (to the east).

== Municipality ==
The municipality Sithonia was formed at the 2011 local government reform by the merger of the following 2 former municipalities, that became municipal units:

- Sithonia
- Toroni

The municipality has an area of 516.848 km^{2}, the municipal unit 322.875 km^{2}. The municipal unit Sithonia consists of the communities Agios Nikolaos, Metagkitsi, Neos Marmaras and Nikiti.

== Places ==
- Agios Nikolaos
- Armenistis (camping)
- Elia Beach
- Kalamitsi
- Metamorfosi
- Neos Marmaras
- Nikiti
- Ormos Panagias
- Parthenonas (traditional village)
- Platanitsi
- Porto Carras (popular resort town)
- Porto Koufo
- Pyrgadikia
- Salonikiou
- Sarti
- Sykia
- Toroni
- Vourvourou

== See also ==
- Mount Itamos
