= Toronean Gulf =

Gulf in Northeastern Greece

Toronean Gulf Toronaic Gulf Kassandra Gulf
- Τορωναίος (Greek); Τορωναϊκὸς (Ancient Greek); Κασσάνδρας (Greek)
- Location of the Toronean Gulf within Greece
- Location: Central Macedonia
- Coordinates: 40°8′N 23°38′E
- Type: Gulf
- Etymology: Toroni
- Part of: Aegean Sea
- Basin countries: Greece

The Toronean Gulf or Toroneos Gulf (Greek: Τορωναίος κόλπος, romanized: Toronaios Kolpos) and Toronaic Gulf (Ancient Greek: Τορωναϊκὸς κόλπος), also known as the Kassandra Gulf (Greek: Κόλπος Κασσάνδρας, romanized: Kolpos Kassandras), is a gulf of the Thracian Sea, part of the northern Aegean Sea, in Chalkidiki, Greece. It lies between the Kassandra peninsula in the west, and Sithonia in the east.

== History ==
According to Herodotus, the gulf was historically known for its fish. The harbour of Torone, the only city on the gulf, was known as the "deaf" harbour due to the gulf's quietness and calmness.

The ancient city of Olynthus was said to be at the head of the Toronean Gulf.

An international swimming race occurs every year in July called the Toroneos Gulf Marathon (Κολυμβητικός διαπλους Τορωναιου Κόλπου). The race, which first occurred in 1971, is 25 km long and begins in Kallithea Kassandra and finishes in Nikiti Sithonia.
