= Toroni =

Toroni Τορώνη
- Municipal unit
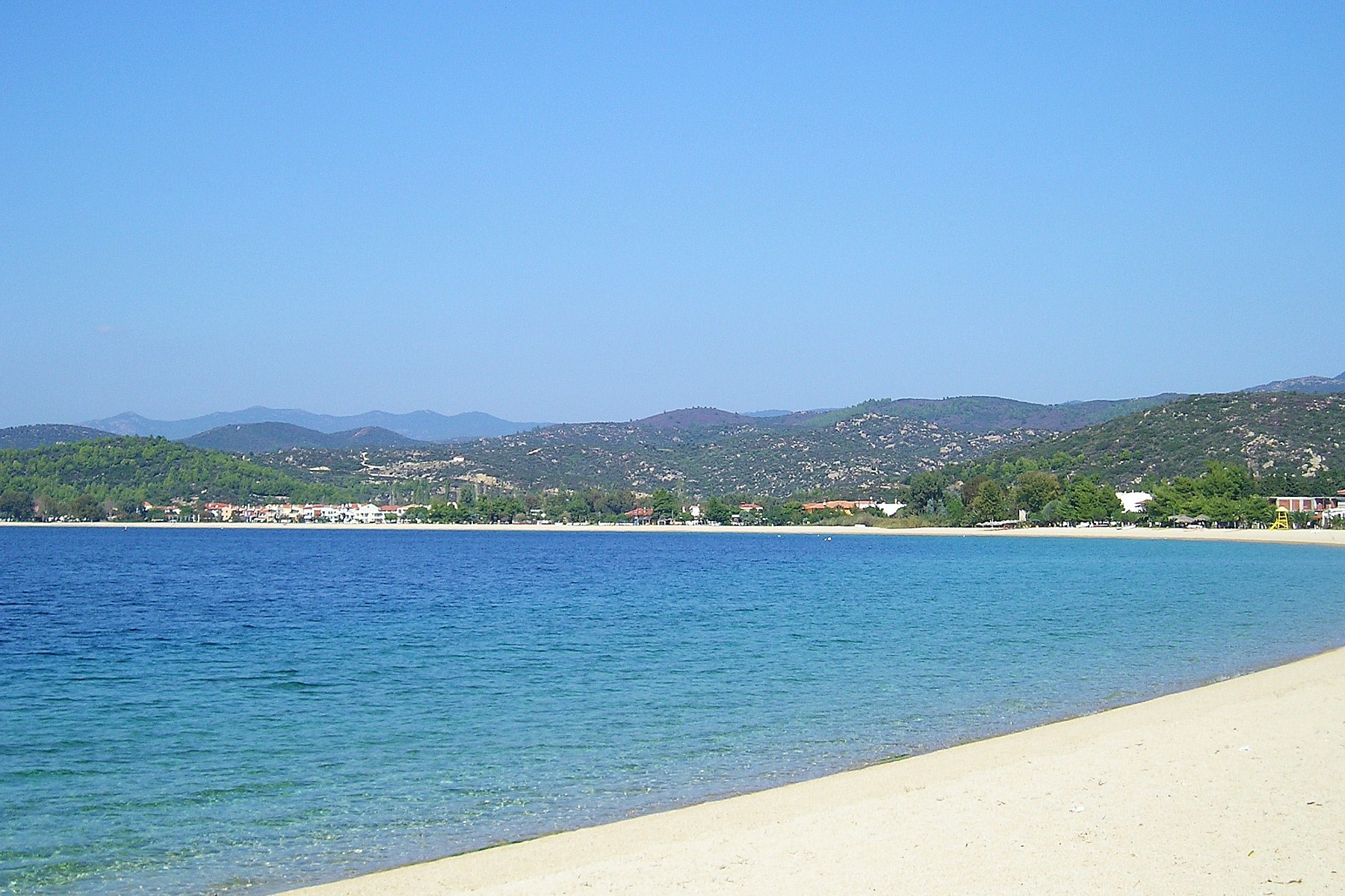

- Location within the regional unit

- Location within Greece
- Coordinates: 39°59′N 23°54′E
- Country: Greece
- Administrative region: Central Macedonia
- Regional unit: Chalkidiki
- Municipality: Sithonia

Area
  - Municipal unit: 194.0 km^{2} (74.9 sq mi)

Population (2021)
  - Municipal unit: 3,330
  - Municipal unit density: 17.2/km^{2} (44.5/sq mi)
- Time zone: UTC+2 (EET)
  - Summer (DST): UTC+3 (EEST)
- Vehicle registration: ΧΚ

Toroni (Ancient Greek: Τορώνη, Toróne, modern pronunciation Toróni) is an ancient Greek city and a former municipality in the southwest edge of Sithonia peninsula in Chalkidiki, Greece. Since the 2011 local government reform it is part of the municipality Sithonia, of which it is a municipal unit. The municipal unit has an area of 193.973 km^{2}.

== Name ==
Its name derives from Torone, the daughter of Poseidon and Phoenice and the wife of Proteus.

== History ==
The ancient city was founded by Chalkidian settlers probably during the 8th century BC. Its strategic location and rich resources developed Toroni into one of the most significant cities in Chalkidiki, giving its name to the gulf that forms between Pallene and Sithonia peninsulas. During the Greco-Persian Wars it allied with the Persians, who as a reward gave Olynthus to Kritoboulos, a local ruler, in 479 and later became part of the Athenaean League, contributing one of the highest taxes that reached 12 Attic talents per year, giving an indication of its prosperity.

When the Peloponnesian War broke out, the Athenians, fearing a revolt against them, placed a garrison in the city but that did not stop Brasidas, the Spartan general from seizing the city with a surprise attack during the night, before he came to an understanding with the Toronaeans in 423. He then tried to expand the city's walls by including the harbour suburb (Προάστειον Proasteion), before leaving to attack Amphipolis. However, the Athenians recaptured Toroni under Cleon, just before the return of Brasidas, who was 2 miles away. When war ended, Toroni, a leading member of the Olynthian synoecism, became part of the Chalcidian League, which included most of the peninsula's cities. It was besieged by the Athenian General Timotheus by means of cutters attached to the top of masts made to cut open sandbags used in the city's defence. After 348, and the abolition of the league by Phillip, Toroni became part of Macedon.

In 168 BC the Romans invaded and the city decayed, but did not cease to exist, as indicated by the harbour fort, Lecythus, which was rebuilt during the Byzantine era. It was also a bishopric, and is still a titular see in the Roman Catholic Church. The site continued to be occupied up to the 17th century, when the population abandoned the old city and moved to the modern town of Toroni, about 1 km north of the ancient city. Its strong walls and other buildings were destroyed in 1903, when the Ottomans used the city's granite stones to cover some central roads of Constantinople and Thessaloniki.

== Topography - Archaeology ==
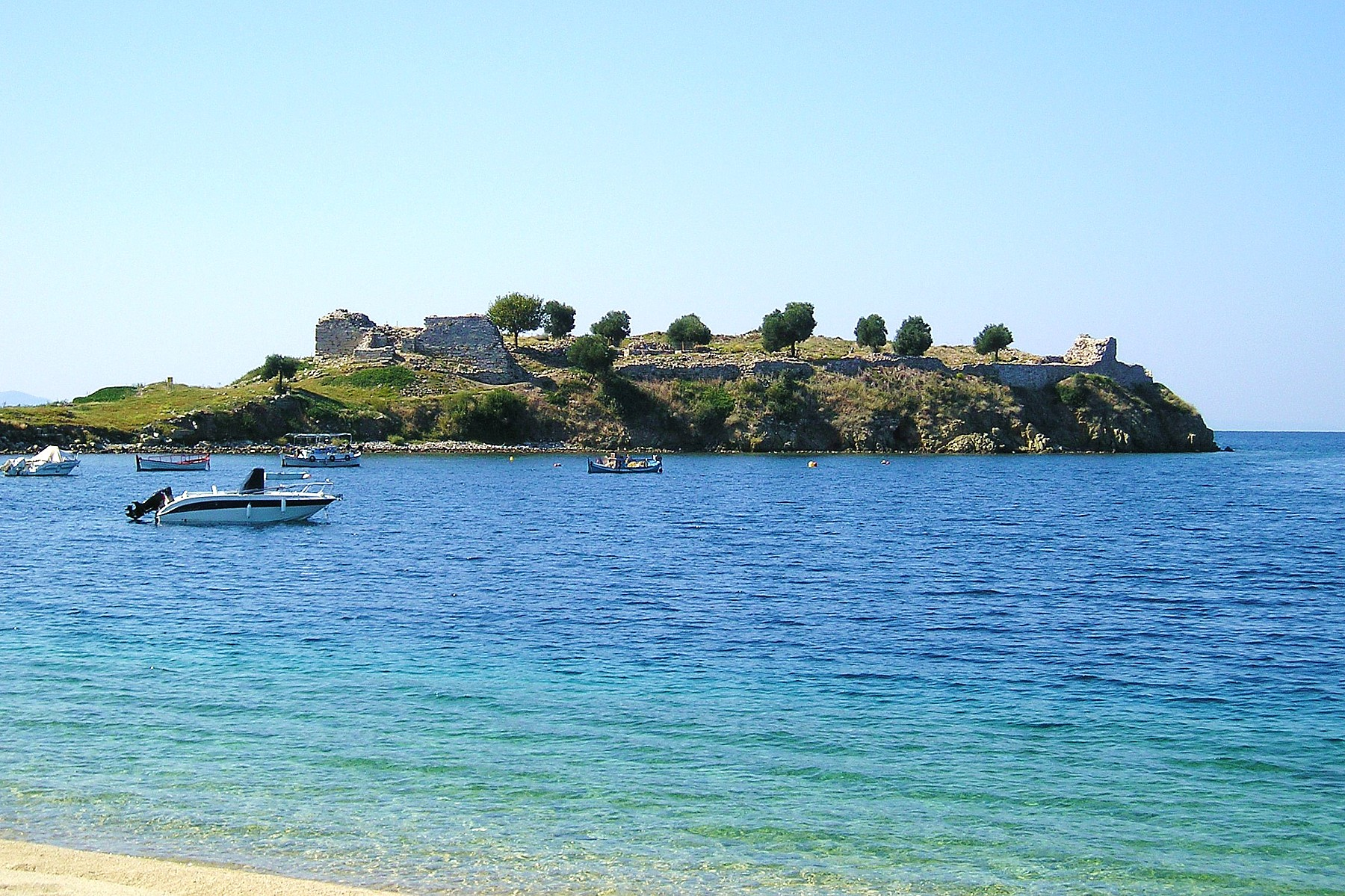
The Lecythus fort.

Traces of prehistoric settlements of the 3rd century BC and many other ancient remains, including early Christian and Byzantine temples, and castles are evidence that the area was inhabited continuously from the Neolithic era. Surveys were conducted by the XVI Ephorate of Classical Antiquities in 1975. The harbour port, Lecythus (Λήκυθος Lekythos), is being refurbished. The ancient city extends in three main areas: the Acropolis located to the rocky and extremely bluff hill between Porto Koufo and Lecythus, which was connected with the city via long walls; the main ancient city, in the plateau southwest of acropolis up to the coast, that includes Lecythus fort; and the Proasteion (suburb) of the city, in today's narrow, but in antiquity much broader neck of land that connects Lecythus and the city.

In the Acropolis and the main city, parts of the fortification are clearly visible along with dispread stone blocks, ancient pantiles and broken pottery which are found everywhere. Unfortunately, most of the city's buildings were destroyed in the beginning of the 20th century, when the Ottoman authorities hired an Italian engineer in order to collect the stone blocks to use them as paving in roads. The Lecythus fort, next to the harbour, was rebuilt during the Byzantine era, along with cisterns and a small early Christian temple.

Parts of the ancient city, including most of the Proasteion, the agora and the ancient harbour are nowadays sunk 35m from the coast, as the underwater surveys have proven, since a large 60m long and 2m wide foundation was found, probably the ancient seawall. The whole area between this foundation and the modern coastline is scattered with stoneworks and large amounts of pottery, which indicate the presence of large buildings. All these are concluding that this is the area that the Athenaean garrison fortified when Brasidas seized the city, according to Thucydides' accounts.

Special emphasis was given by the excavators to the cemetery during the inhabitance of the Iron era. Its duration is approximated to be from the end of the 2nd century till the middle of the 9th century. In this cemetery 134 tombs were discovered with 118 being cremated and 16 simple burials. There were 500 pots discovered which were used either as burials or as cremators for the dead.

== Modern Toroni ==
Modern Toroni is a municipal unit in Sithonia, Chalkidiki, Greece with a population of 4,036 (2001). The seat of the former municipality was in Sykia. Its 2.5 km long curved beach of thick yellow sand is considered as one of the best in Sithonia, the middle peninsula of Chalkidiki, and comprise one of the most popular summer resorts of Sithonia.

== Subdivisions ==
The municipal unit Toroni is subdivided into the following communities (constituent villages in brackets):

- Sarti
- Sykia (Sykia, Valti, Destenika, Kalamitsi, Koufos, Paralia Sykias, Pigadaki, Platania, Toroni)

== Population ==
Year	Settlement population	Municipality population
1991	242	3,870
2001	233	4,036
2011	213	3,553
2021	204	3,330
