= Sykia, Chalkidiki =

Sykia Συκιά
- Community
- Location within Greece
- Coordinates: 40°2′20″N 23°56′27″E
- Country: Greece
- Administrative region: Central Macedonia
- Regional unit: Chalkidiki
- Municipality: Sithonia
- Municipal unit: Toroni
- Elevation: 40 m (130 ft)

Population (2021)
  - Community: 2,276
- Time zone: UTC+2 (EET)
  - Summer (DST): UTC+3 (EEST)
- Postal code: 630 78
- Area code: 23750
- Vehicle registration: XK

Sykia (Greek: Συκιά) is a village on the Chalkidiki peninsula in Macedonia, Greece. It is a traditional village in the Sithonia peninsula and has been inhabited since the Byzantine period. Modern Greek singers Sokratis Malamas and Paola Foka both grew up in Sykia.
