= Neos Marmaras =

Town in Macedonia, Greece

Neos Marmaras Νέος Μαρμαράς
- Community
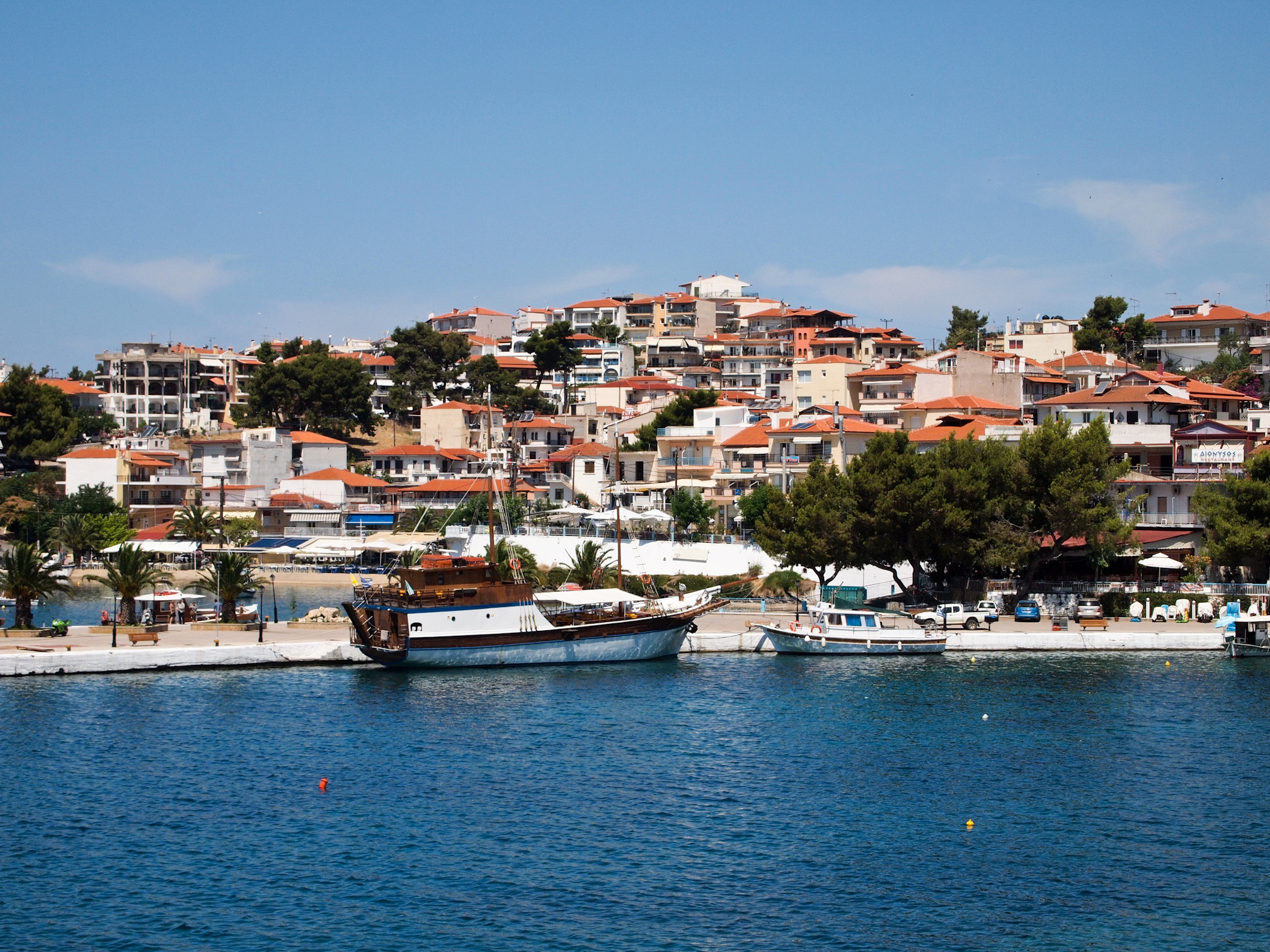

- Location within Greece
- Coordinates: 40°06′N 23°47′E
- Country: Greece
- Administrative region: Central Macedonia
- Regional unit: Chalkidiki
- Municipality: Sithonia
- Municipal unit: Sithonia

Population (2021)
  - Community: 3,038
- Time zone: UTC+2 (EET)
  - Summer (DST): UTC+3 (EEST)

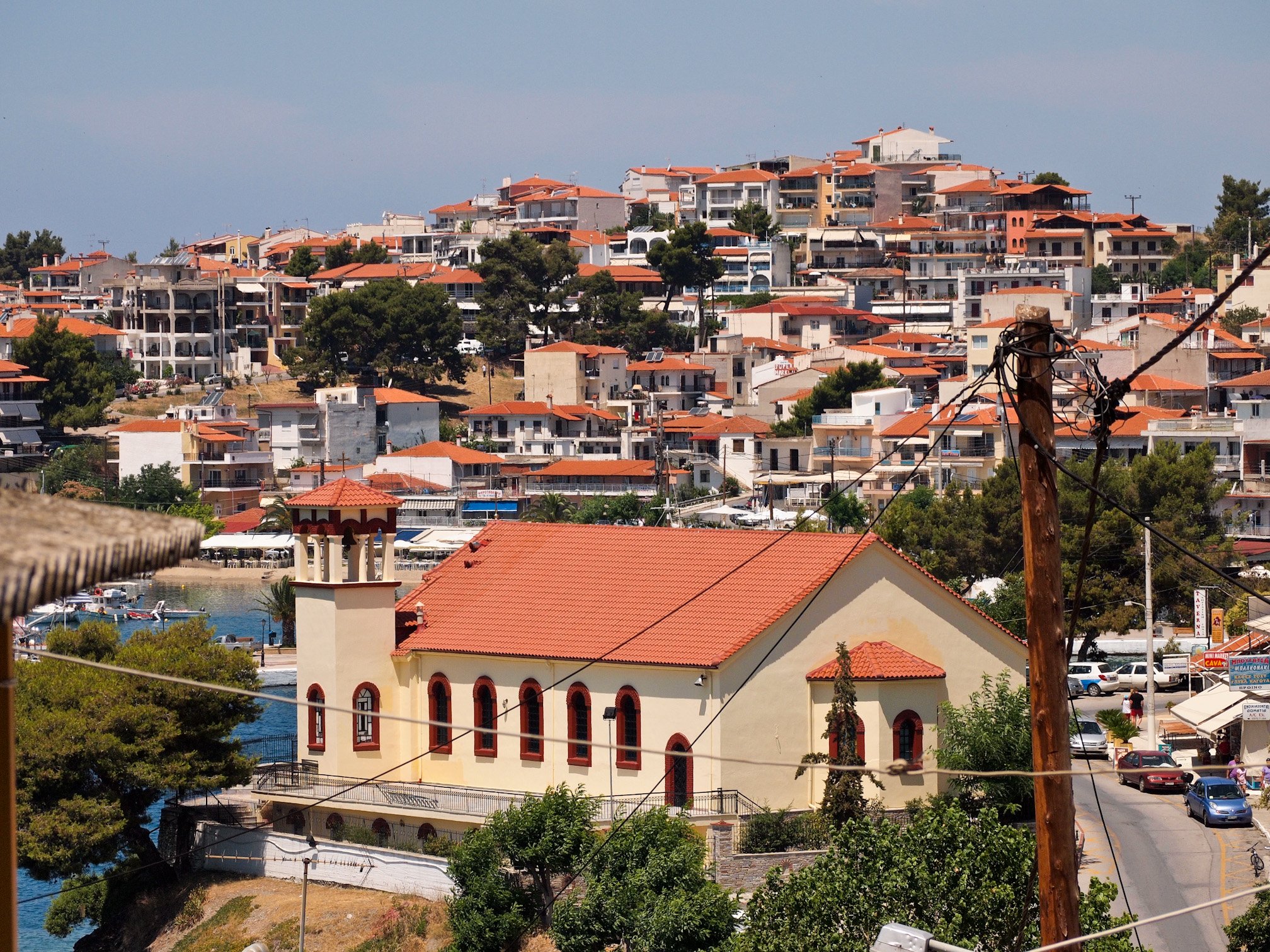
Taxiarches church

Neos Marmaras (Greek: Νέος Μαρμαράς, Néos Marmarás, pronounced [ˌneos marmaˈras], "New Marmara") is a town on the Sithonia peninsula, in the Chalkidiki peninsula, Macedonia, Greece. In 2021, Neos Marmaras had 3,038 permanent residents; however, the summer-time population has been estimated at 20,000. The main industries are tourism, agriculture (olives, wine, and honey), and fishing. Situated on three shoreline hills, below the two mountains, Itamos and Dragoudeli, Neos Marmaras is located 125 kilometres (78 mi) from Thessaloniki, 55 kilometres (34 mi) from Poligyros and 9 kilometres (6 mi) from Elia (Nikiti).

== History ==
Most of the residents are originally from Marmara Island, in the Sea of Marmara, and from Parthenonas, a small village on the mountain, Itamos.

Neos Marmaras was formed in 1925 by Greek refugees from Marmara Island following the Asia Minor catastrophe and exchange of populations with Turkey.

In 1970, the traditional inland hill village of Parthenonas was abandoned and these inhabitants moved down to the coast and also settled in Neos Marmaras boosting its population.

Since the 1980s, Neos Marmaras has become a popular tourist town with numerous cafes, restaurants and bars along the waterfront being very busy in the summer months.

== Historic Population ==
Historic Population Evolution of Neos Marmaras
Year	Population	%±
1940	1.238	_
1951	1.337	8,0
1961	1.587	18,7
1971	1.706	7,5
1981	2.407	41,1
1991	2.474	2,8
2001	2.840	14,8
2011	3.352	18,0
2021	3.038	-9,3

== Porto Carras ==
Porto Carras is a big 5-star resort outside Neos Marmaras. It is one of the biggest in northern Greece. There is also a famous wine from Porto Carras called Domaine Porto Carras.

== Settlements ==
Neos Marmaras has numerous settlements and islands including:

- Paradeisos (Greek: Παράδεισος, pronounced [paˈraðisos]), a small settlement close to Neos Marmaras. It has approximately 40 people and lies just downhill of Marmaras in a low-lying area.
- Agia Kyriaki (Greek: Αγία Κυριακή, pronounced [aˌʝia ciriaˈci]), a very small marina and fishing settlement in a small bay outside Marmaras with some 20 people living there in the summertime.
- Imeri Elia (Greek: Ήμερη Ελιά, pronounced [ˌimeri eˈʎa]) is a small settlement close to Porto Carras. Some older mills are found in the river, Potamos Neou Marmara near Imeri Elia. The area has some 20 people living there in summer.
- Azapiko Beach (Greek: Αζάπικο, pronounced [aˈzapiko]), a famous beach outside Marmaras, with only 5 people living there in summertime.
- Kelyfos Island (Greek: Κέλυφος, pronounced [ˈcelifos]), meaning Shield Island in Greek, is an island located just outside the bay of Neos Marmaras. It is also called Turtle Island, as the island is said to look like a turtle. The island was a strategic hiding point during the ancient days of Greece and in some cases during the Second World War.
- Spalathronisia (Greek: Σπαλαθρονήσια, pronounced [spalaθroˈnisça]). This island is located near Azapiko beach. It is the biggest island on the west side of Sithonia peninsula.

== Climate ==
Neos Marmaras has a hot semi-arid climate (Köppen climate classification: BSh) with strong Mediterranean influences. Winter highs are around 13 °C (55 °F) while summer highs are around 32 °C (90 °F). Winters are particularly mild, and on average they are slightly warmer than the French Riviera, while it is one of the few areas of Macedonia with a hot semi-arid climate. According to the National Observatory of Athens station data, Neos Marmaras falls in hardiness zone 10a.

Climate data for Neos Marmaras 6 m a.s.l.
Month	Jan	Feb	Mar	Apr	May	Jun	Jul	Aug	Sep	Oct	Nov	Dec	Year
Record high °C (°F)	20.7 (69.3)	22.8 (73.0)	22.8 (73.0)	26.5 (79.7)	32.4 (90.3)	36.4 (97.5)	39.9 (103.8)	41.6 (106.9)	37.0 (98.6)	29.3 (84.7)	26.1 (79.0)	19.8 (67.6)	41.6 (106.9)
Mean daily maximum °C (°F)	12.3 (54.1)	13.8 (56.8)	15.6 (60.1)	19.5 (67.1)	24.3 (75.7)	29.4 (84.9)	32.3 (90.1)	32.5 (90.5)	27.9 (82.2)	22.4 (72.3)	18.1 (64.6)	14 (57)	21.8 (71.3)
Daily mean °C (°F)	9.5 (49.1)	10.8 (51.4)	12.2 (54.0)	15.4 (59.7)	19.9 (67.8)	25 (77)	27.8 (82.0)	28.1 (82.6)	24 (75)	19 (66)	15.2 (59.4)	11.3 (52.3)	18.2 (64.7)
Mean daily minimum °C (°F)	6.7 (44.1)	7.7 (45.9)	8.7 (47.7)	11.3 (52.3)	15.6 (60.1)	20.6 (69.1)	23.2 (73.8)	23.7 (74.7)	20.1 (68.2)	15.6 (60.1)	12.3 (54.1)	8.6 (47.5)	14.5 (58.1)
Record low °C (°F)	−4.2 (24.4)	−0.5 (31.1)	0.6 (33.1)	4.2 (39.6)	10.5 (50.9)	13.1 (55.6)	16.3 (61.3)	18.6 (65.5)	13.2 (55.8)	9.9 (49.8)	3.7 (38.7)	−0.6 (30.9)	−4.2 (24.4)
Average rainfall mm (inches)	58.5 (2.30)	29.1 (1.15)	50.1 (1.97)	25.7 (1.01)	21.1 (0.83)	31.1 (1.22)	27.7 (1.09)	11 (0.4)	27.7 (1.09)	34.5 (1.36)	41.6 (1.64)	74.1 (2.92)	432.2 (16.98)
Source: National Observatory of Athens (Feb 2014 - Nov 2025), Neos Marmaras N.O.A station and World Meteorological Organization
