= Porto Carras =

Hotel in Sithonia, Greece

Coordinates: 40°04′44″N 23°47′52″E

Porto Carras Grand Resort
- Πόρτο Καρράς
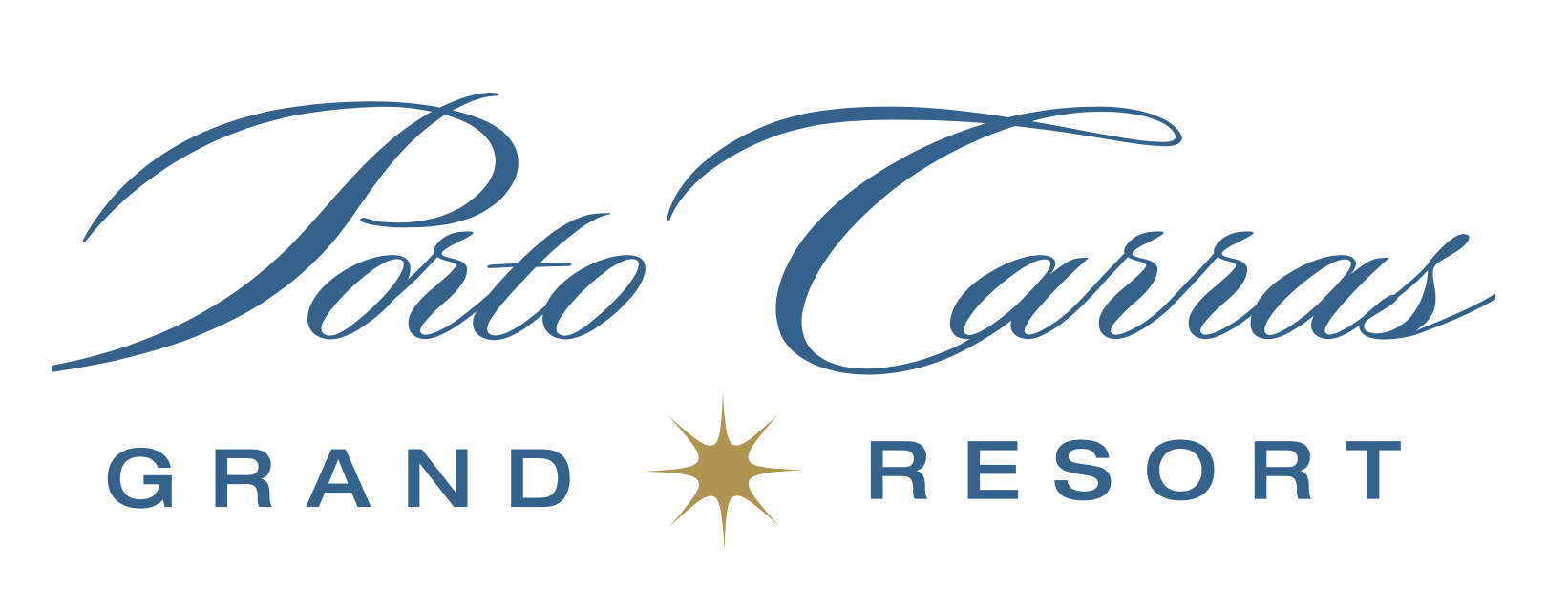

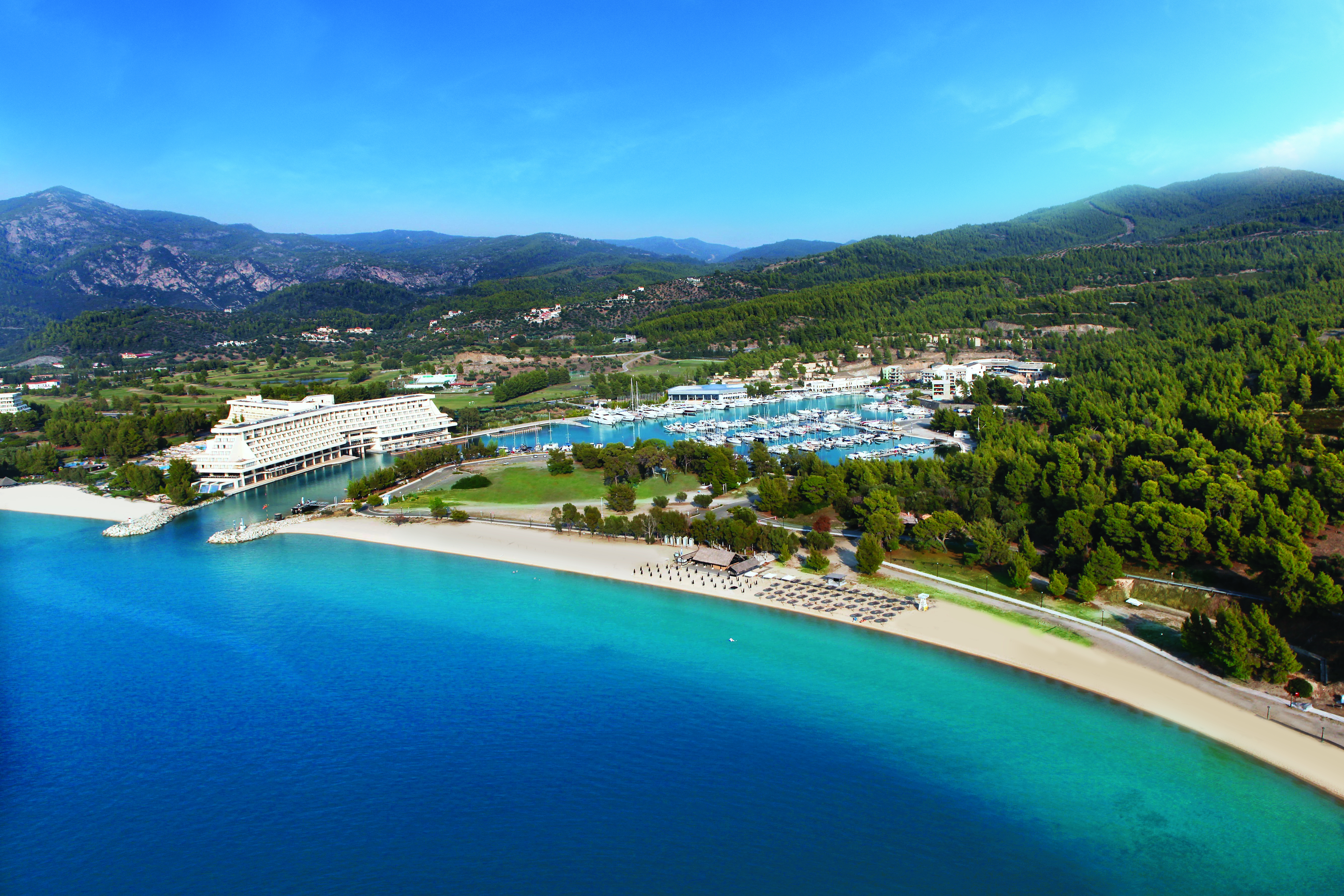

General information
- Location: Neos Marmaras 630 81, Greece, Greece
- Opened: 1973
- Owner: Belterra Investments

Height
- Top floor: 6

Technical details
- Size: 1800 hectares
- Floor count: 6

Design and construction
- Architect: Walter Gropius
- Awards: Greece's Best Incentive Hotel 2022 - MICE tourism
- Known for: One of Greece's largest resorts Hosting prestigious events

Other information
- Number of rooms: 479

Website
- https://www.portocarras.com

Porto Carras (Greek: Πόρτο Καρράς), known as Porto Carras Grand Resort, is one of northern Greece's largest and most famous hotels and holiday resorts. It is located on Sithonia, Chalkidiki peninsula in Macedonia, Greece. It is about 120 km away from Greece's second-biggest city, Thessaloniki.

Porto Carras has garnered a reputation as a popular destination particularly among Serbian tourists, who comprise as much as 90% of monthly visitor traffic. Its array of amenities, including luxurious hotels, a marina, a casino, and an on-demand Burek eatery, coupled with its proximity to Serbia, have contributed to its appeal within this demographic.

== History ==
Porto Carras was created by Yiannis Carras, a Greek businessman and ship-owner. Originally it was planned with the renowned architect Walter Gropius, but the construction works started posthumously in 1973. The project brought a revolution to Chalkidiki's tourism.

In April 2020, Porto Carras changed ownership and became a member of Ivan Savvidis' controlled Belterra Investments.

== Specifications ==
Porto Carras Grand Resort includes two major hotels, the 5-star Meliton and 4-star Sithonia as well as the bungalow style hotels Marina Village and Kalyva Mare. There are also 45,000 olive trees; basketball, football, tennis, and golf sports areas as well as a vineyard covering an area of 475,000 m². Porto Carras is home to the biggest private marina in northern Greece, having berths for 315 boats. It also contains restaurants, spa, interior and beach bars and a cinema theater.

== Location ==
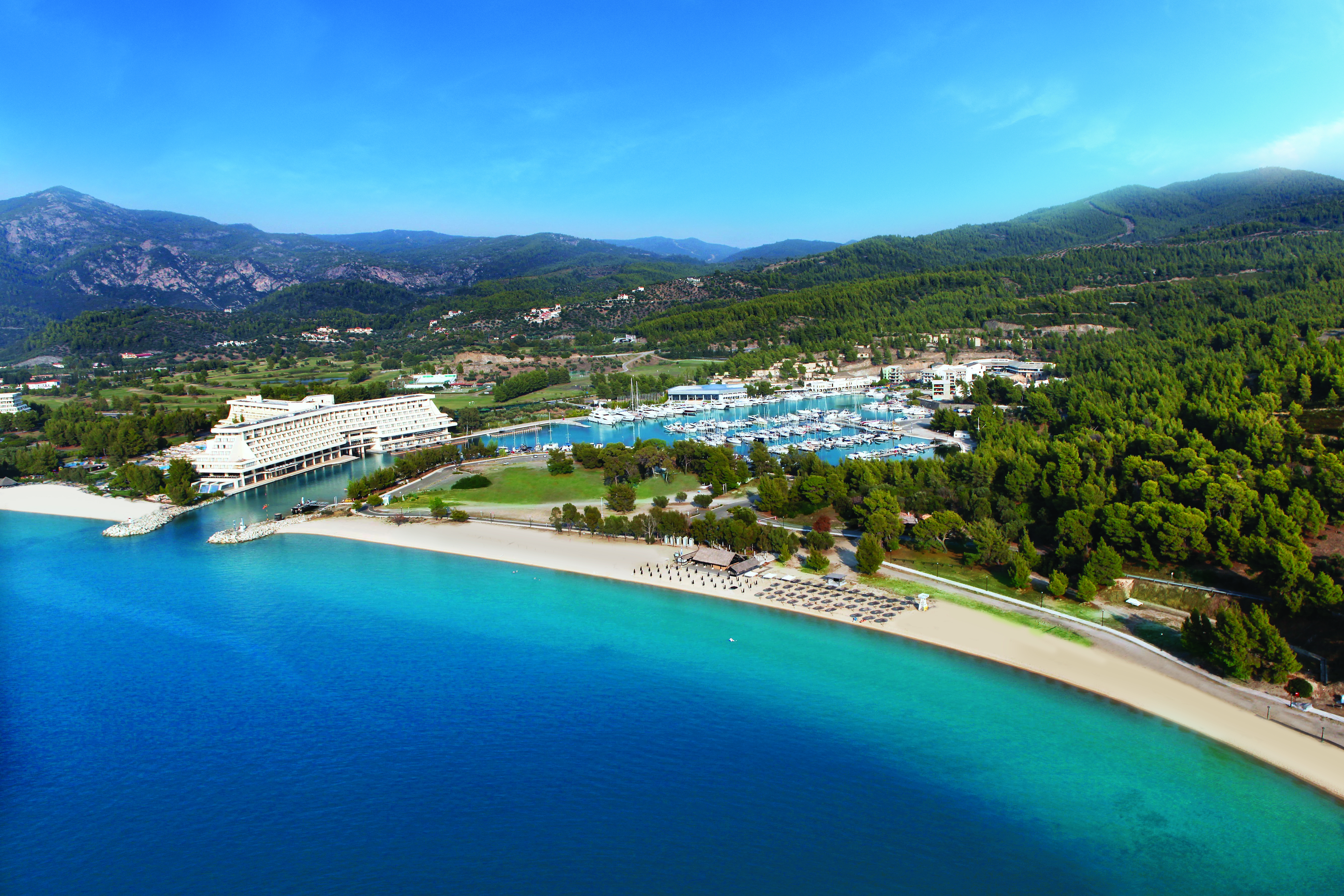
Porto Carras Grand Resort 2021

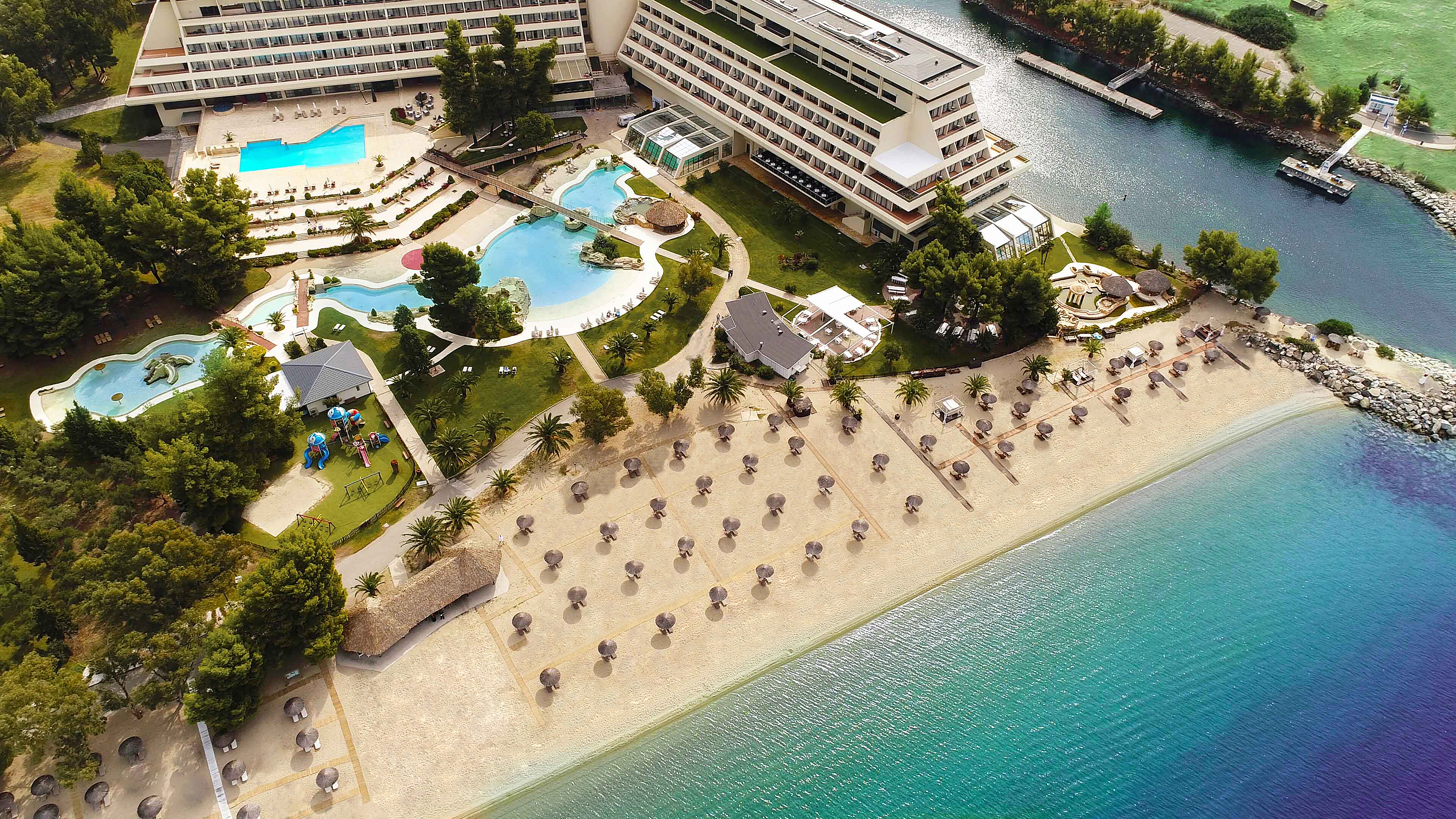
Porto Carras Meliton

The resort of Porto Carras is near the traditional village of Neos Marmaras; a tourist destination, busy during the summer period, with many restaurants, cafeterias and tourist shops.

== Held events ==
In June 2003, Porto Carras hosted the Thessaloniki European Union Summit, organized under the Greek Presidency of the Council of the European Union. During the summit, the draft Constitution of Europe was presented for the first time. The leaders of the 25 member states of the European Union, together with Turkey's prime minister and the heads of NATO and the European Union institutions, attended an official dinner hosted by the then President of Greece.

Porto Carras hosted the European Team Chess Championship in 2011.

The resort also hosted the World Amateur Chess Championship in 2018.

== Other information ==
Porto Carras was the recipient of MICE's Best Incentive Hotel in 2022 for Greece.

Porto Carras offers complementary WiFi to its guests. The WiFi service, alongside the internal booking platform, are provided by Zoottle.
