= Porto Koufo =

Harbour in Sithonia, Chalkidiki, Greece

Coordinates: 39°57′49″N 23°55′19″E

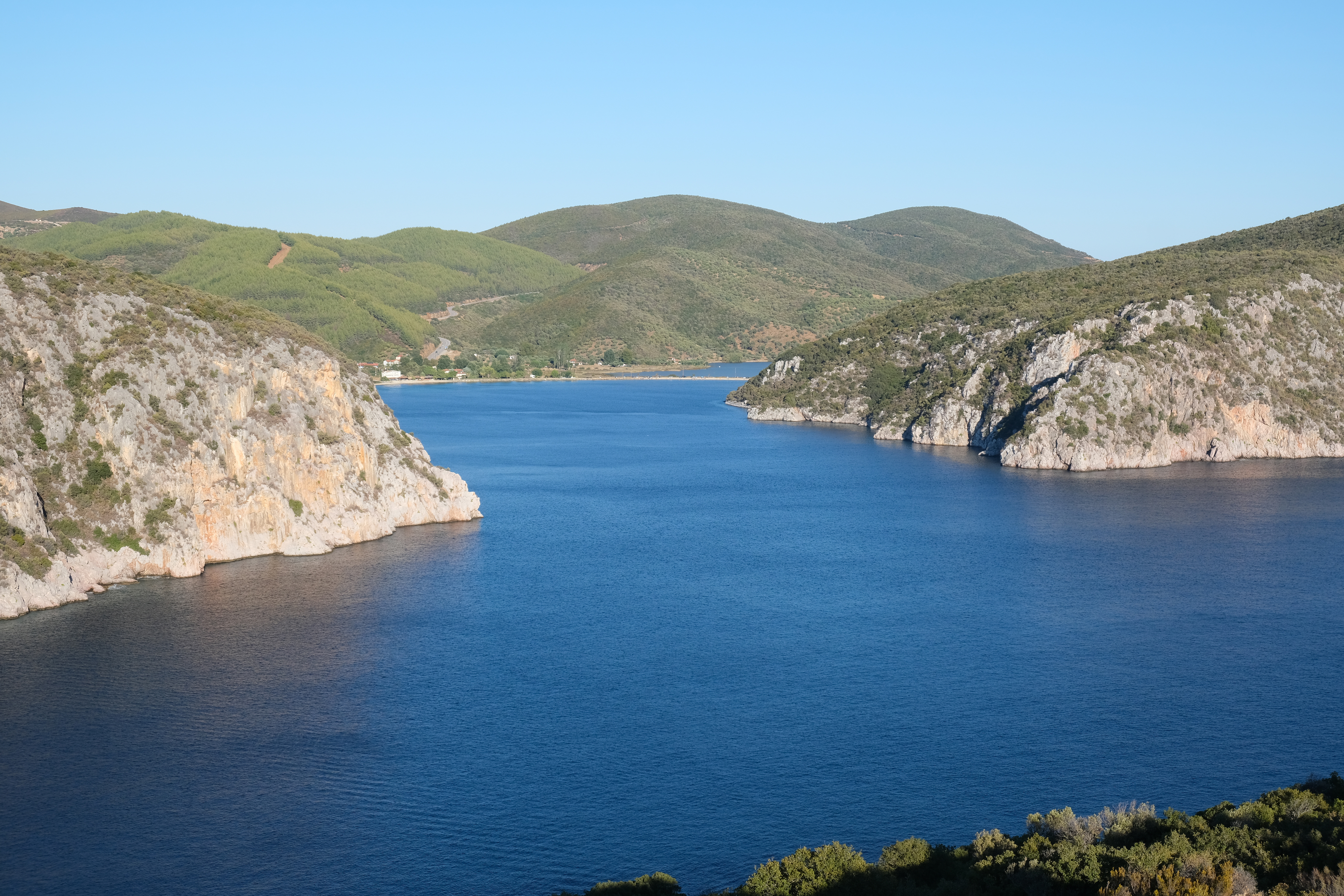
Entry to Porto Koufo

Porto Koufo (Greek: Πόρτο Κουφό) is a natural harbour in Greece. The harbour was mentioned by the historian Thucydides. German submarines used it during World War II because of its geographical location and direct access to the Aegean Sea.

Porto Koufo is located in the municipality Sithonia, Chalkidiki.
