= Nikiti =

Nikiti Νικήτη
- Community
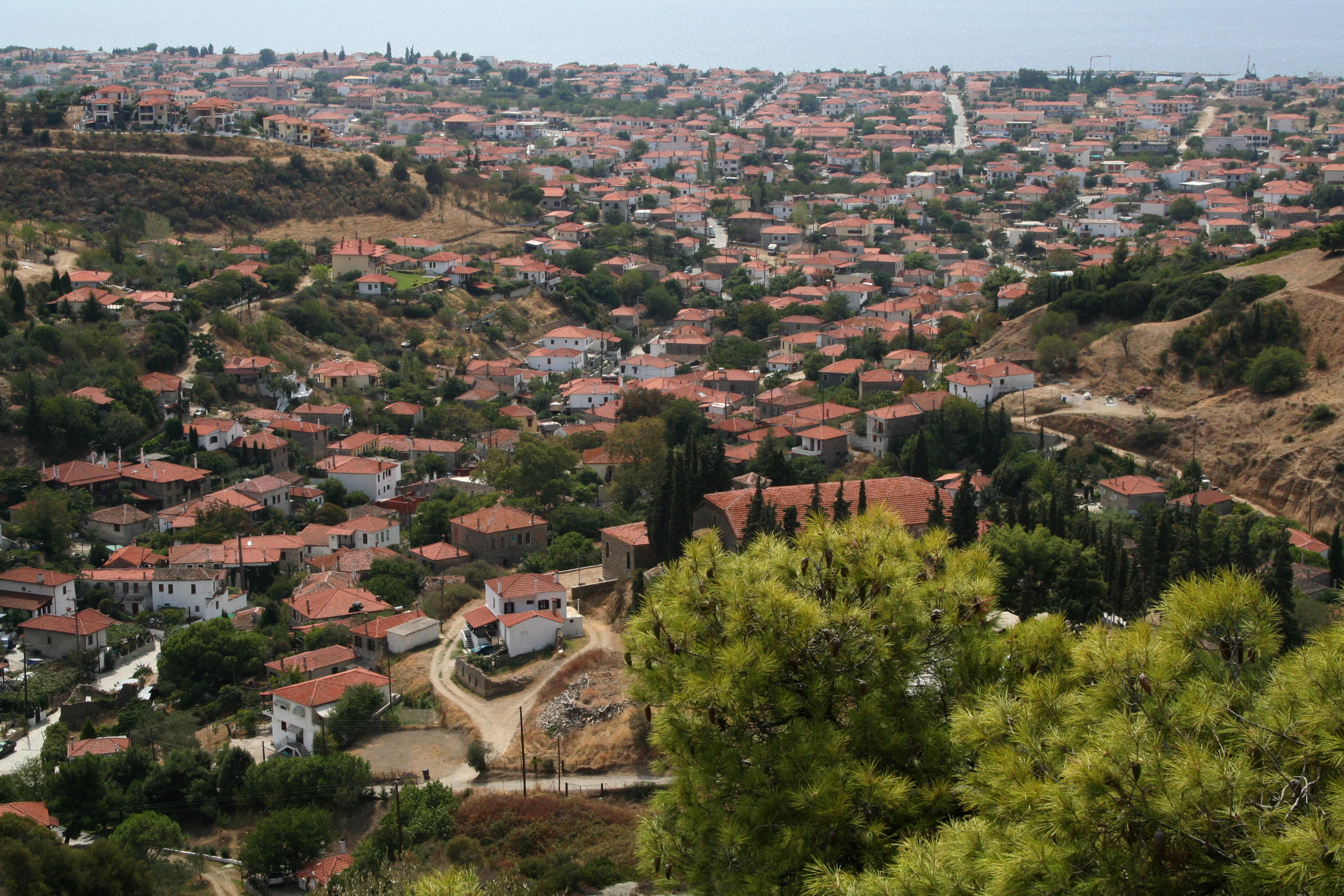
- Panorama of Nikiti

- Location within Greece
- Coordinates: 40°12.58′N 23°40.43′E
- Country: Greece
- Geographic region: Macedonia
- Administrative region: Central Macedonia
- Regional unit: Chalkidiki
- Municipality: Sithonia
- Municipal unit: Sithonia

Population (2021)
  - Community: 2,922
- Time zone: UTC+2 (EET)
  - Summer (DST): UTC+3 (EEST)
- Postal code: 63088

Nikiti (Greek: Νικήτη) is a village located 100 kilometers south-east of Thessaloniki on the Chalkidiki peninsula in Macedonia, Greece. It is the seat of both the municipal unit and municipality of Sithonia. The town has a preserved old part of town. The newer part of town is located on the seashore, where the beach and newly built marina are located.

== History ==
The ancient Greek city of Galypsos was located south of Nikiti, near Kastri beach. There are remains of an early Byzantine Greek church dating to the 5th century near Agios Georgos beach on the Nikiti foreshore.

The old part of Nikiti village dates to the beginning of the 14th century when inhabitants moved inland to avoid pirate raids. The old village is located on a hilly area a few hundred meters from the sea, with the church of Saint Nikitas at the highest point of the village.

The old village of Nikiti, often referred to as "Old Nikiti", is one of the best-preserved traditional settlements in Sithonia. It is characterized by narrow cobbled streets, stone-built houses, and traditional Macedonian architecture dating back several centuries. Many of the buildings feature wooden balconies and courtyards, reflecting the local architectural style of northern Greece.

At the center of the old village stands the Church of Saint Nikitas, built in 1867, which remains an important cultural and religious landmark. Today, Old Nikiti attracts visitors for its historical atmosphere, small guesthouses, and local tavernas, offering a contrast to the more developed coastal part of the settlement.

Nikiti was under Ottoman Turkish rule from the 15th century until liberation in the Balkan Wars of 1912. The town suffered further in the 1940s during World War Two and fighting in the Greek Civil War.

In the 1950s peace returned and the village started to expand downwards to the coast significantly. In the 1970s the coastal plain was included into plans for the village's development and many new buildings were built there.

The most important economic sector in Nikiti is tourism. Tourism boomed in the 1980s when Nikiti beaches such as Ai Yiannis, Kalogria and Lagomandra became popular. After 2010, a marina was built at the Nikiti beach front amid redevelopment.

Other important economic activities in Nikiti are beekeeping and olive growing. Nikiti has become one of the top honey producing towns in Europe.

== Population ==
The population of Nikiti in 2021 was just over 2,900, though in summer this expands to around 20,000.

The permanent population are mostly indigenous Greeks, though there are also many Greeks from Thessaloniki, Germans, Austrians, Russians and Albanians who own homes or work in the summer months.

== Tourism ==
Chalkidiki is a popular summer tourist destination since the late 1950s when people from Thessaloniki started spending their summer holidays at coastal villages like Nikiti. In the beginning tourists rented rooms in the houses of the villagers. By the 1970s tourists from Austria and Germany started to visit Chalkidiki more frequently. In the 1980s the big tourist boom started. After 2010 many tourists from nearby countries such as Serbia and Bulgaria predominate. In 2015, a marina was constructed. The closest airport is 90 km away near Thessaloniki.

Sightseeing in Nikiti includes the architecture and old churches of the old town, the cafes and bars on the waterfront which are busy in summer, and the beaches to the south of Nikiti including Kalogria beach, Agios Ioannis beach and Lagomandra beach.

== Gallery ==
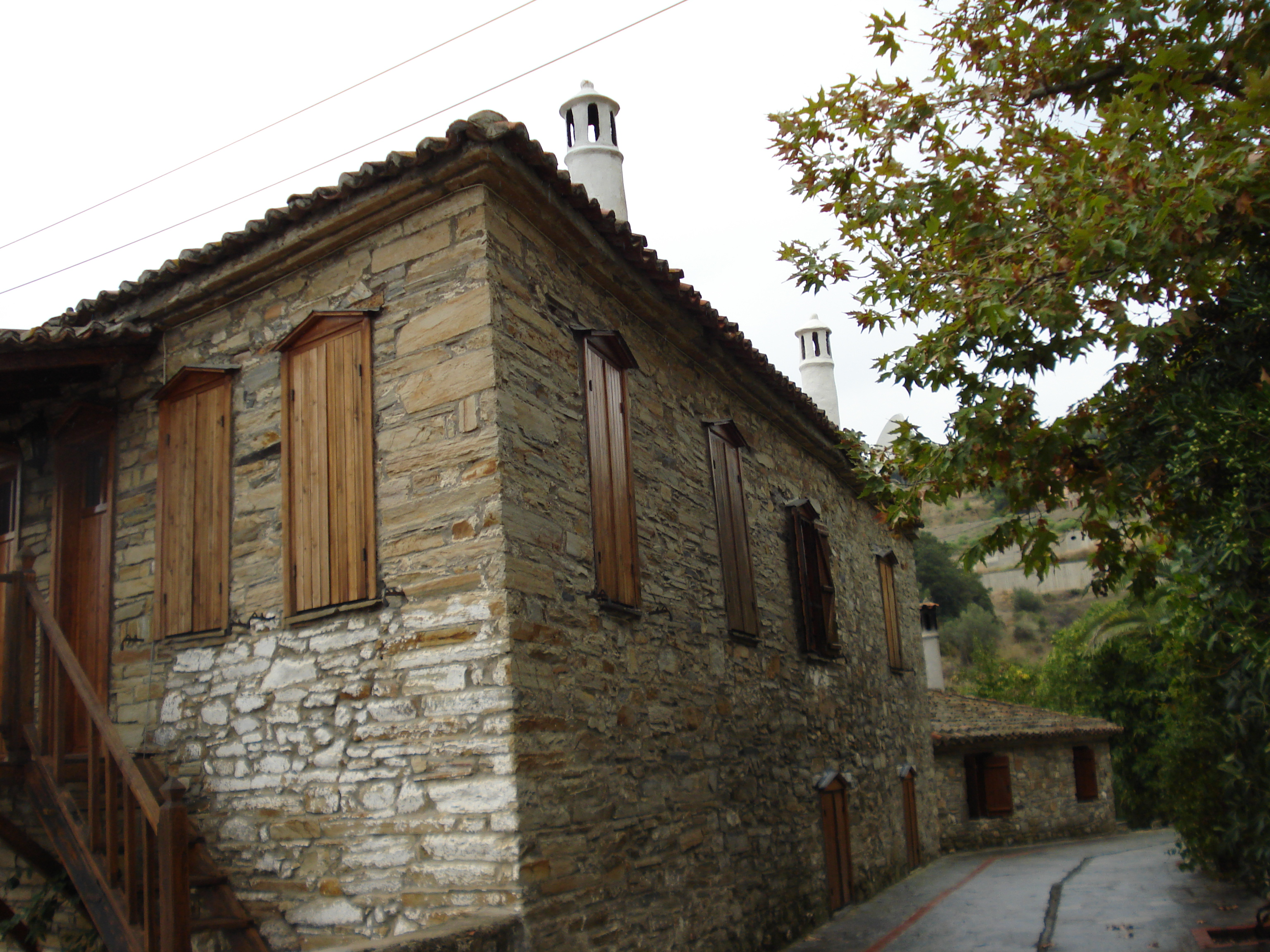
Old house in Nikiti

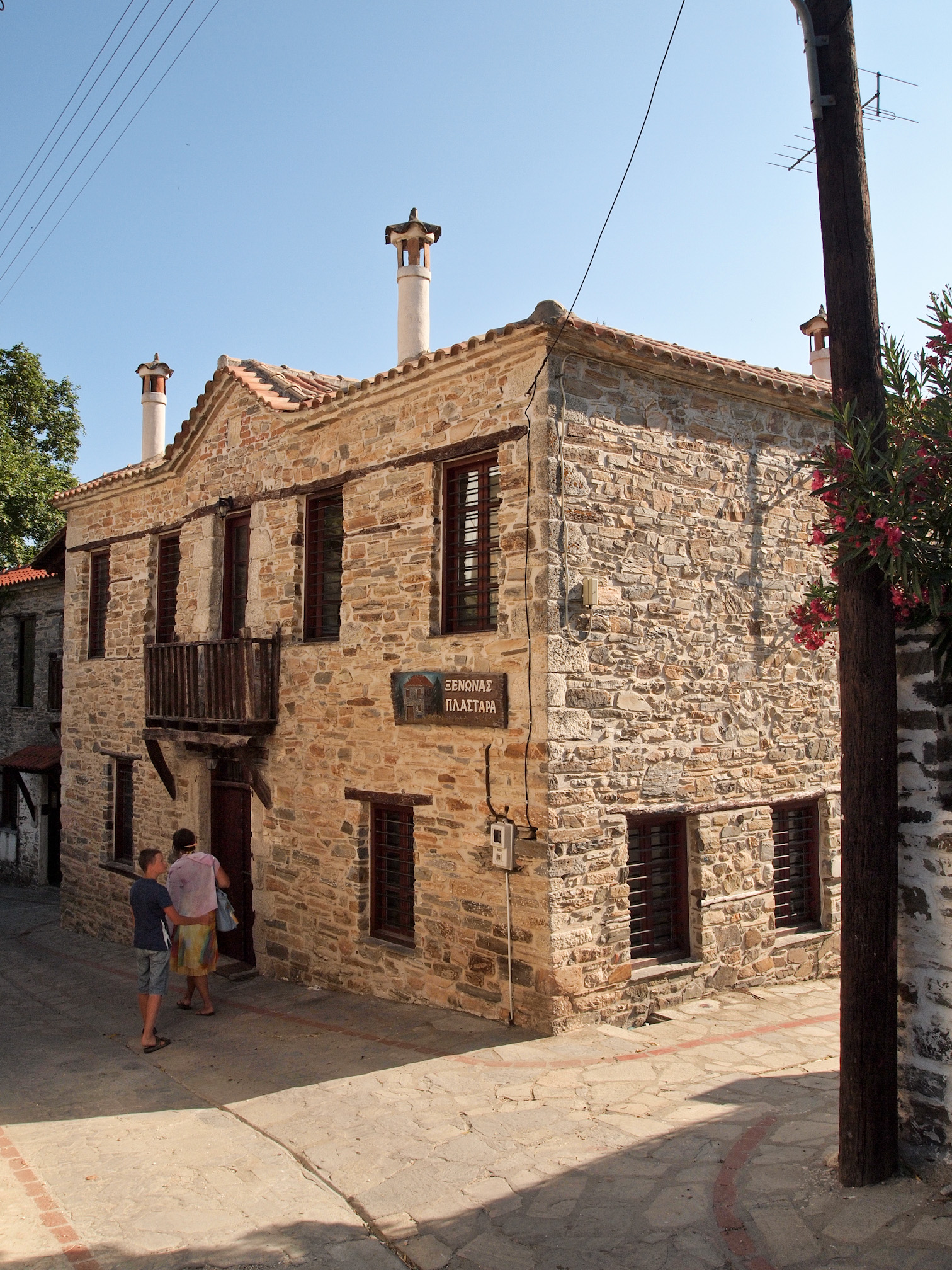
Old house

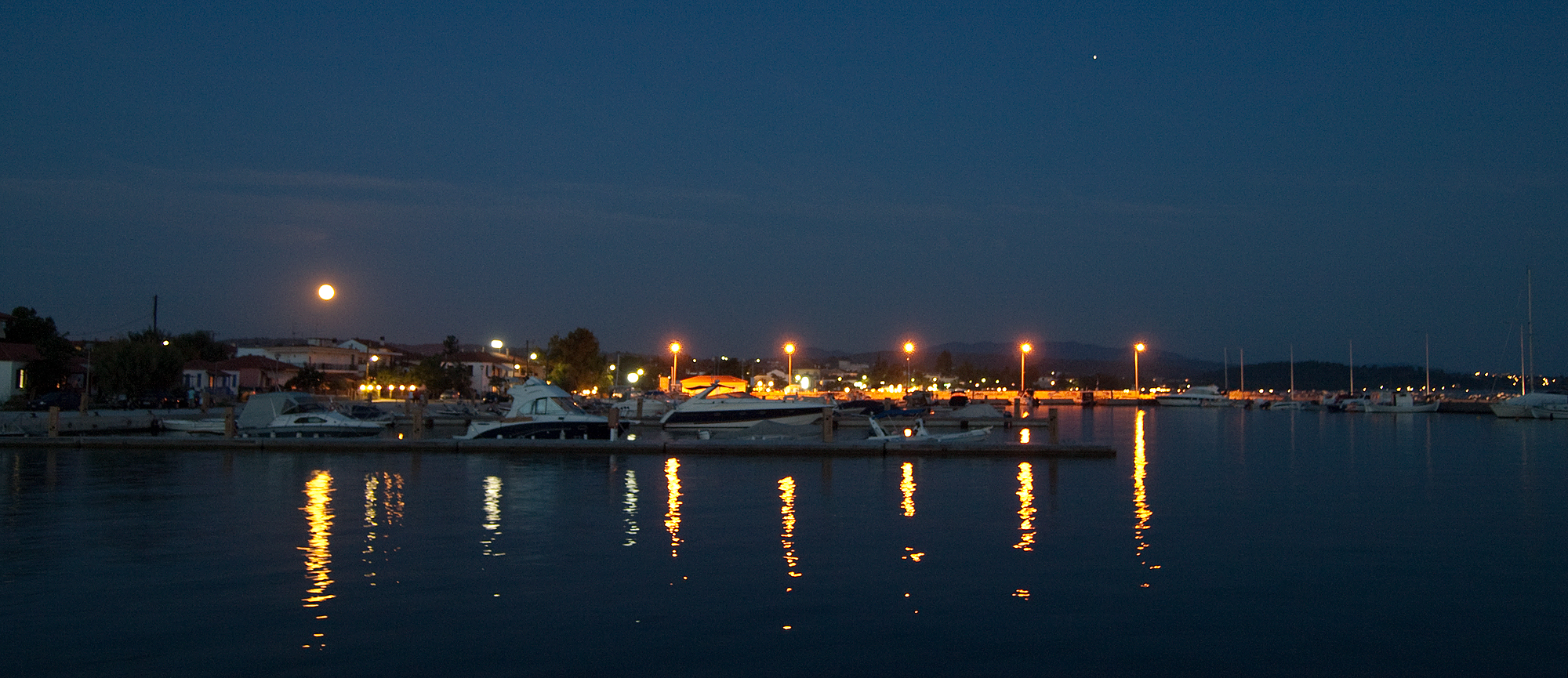
Nikiti port by night

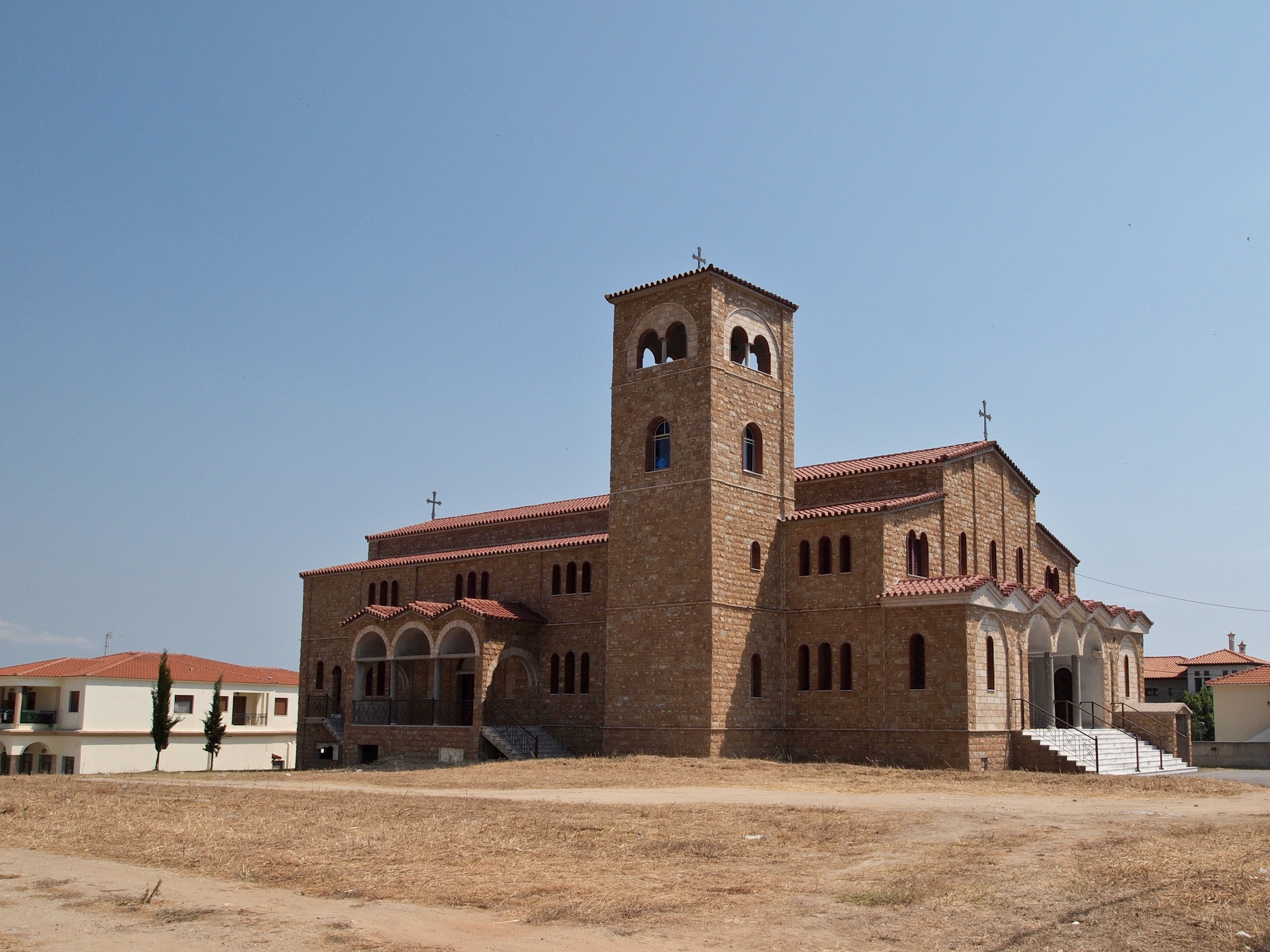
A church

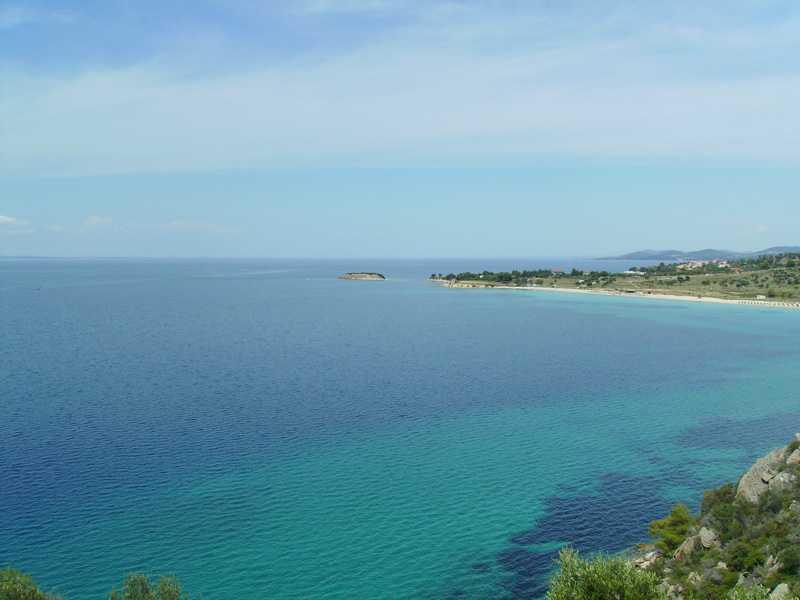
St. John beach
