= Pilorus =

Ancient macedonian city

Coordinates: 40°20′32″N 23°43′29″E

Pilorus or Piloros (Ancient Greek: Πίλωρος) was a town of Sithonia in the Chalcidice in ancient Macedonia, upon the Singitic Gulf between Sane and Singus. It is cited by Herodotus as one of the cities, along with Assa, Singus, and Sarta, located near Mount Athos which Xerxes had ordered to open a channel through which his fleet passed. From these cities he recruited troops, in his expedition of the year 480 BCE against Greece. It belonged to the Delian League since it appears in the tribute registry of Athens in 434/3 BCE.

Its site is located near modern Pyrgadikia.
