= Battle of Mers-el-Fahm =

- Part of Spanish–Ottoman wars
Date	1603
Location	Azeffoun, Kingdom of Kuku
Result	Algerian–Kuku victory

Belligerents
Kingdom of Kuku; Regency of Algiers	Spanish Empire

Commanders and leaders
Prince Abdallah (Regency of Algiers) Soliman Pasha	(Spanish Empire) Viceroy of Majorca (Spanish Empire) Father Matthew †

Strength
Unknown	4 galleys 100+ men

Casualties and losses
None	80 killed

The Battle of Mers-el-Fahm, otherwise known as the Massacre of Mers-el-Fahm was a surprise attack planned by Soliman Pasha and the King of Kuku's nephew, Abdallah, against the Spanish Empire, in which Abdallah promised to let the Spanish install garrisons in the village of Azeffoun only to massacre them after being promised money by Algiers.

== Context ==
A religious man by the name of Father Matthew was a slave in Kuku for a long time, even learning the local language, and he grew close with the Governor of Zeffoun (Azeffoun) Abdallah, who was also Nephew of the King of Kuku. Exploiting the independence of Kuku from Algiers, Matthew devised a plan with him to let Spanish garrisons military access. To which Abdallah promised to give the Spaniards entry at Mers-el-Fahm (Arabic: مرسى الفحم, romanized: Marsā al-Faḥm) However, the Divan of Algiers found out about this plot from spies, and Soliman Pasha took an army and besieged Azzefoun, to which Abdallah surrendered. Soliman asked Abdallah to massacre the Spanish garrison on their arrival at Oued-el-Fahm, promising him 1 sultani for each Christian's head and 200 sultani for Matthew's head, to which Abdallah accepted.

== Massacre ==
Father Matthew arrived with 4 Galleys commanded by the Viceroy of Majorca, and 100 men. When they arrived Abdallah made sure to give them an honorable welcome to make them feel safe. Matthew asked about the son of the King of Kuku, who was to be taken by the Spanish as a hostage. Abdallah told him that his cousin was confined in a fortress and invited Matthew to follow him into the fort to retrieve the hostage. Matthew became suspicious and tried to go back to his galleys only to be attacked by the Kabyles and massacred. The Viceroy of Majorca retreated from the shores leaving Matthew and his 80 men to be killed by Abdallah and his army.

== Aftermath ==
After bringing the heads to Algiers, Soliman Pasha did not give Abdallah anything, with the pretext that Abdallah 'had to bring the slaves alive so they could be held captive or sold as slaves'.
