= Megali Panagia =

Megali Panagia (Greek: Μεγάλη Παναγία, "Great Panagia") is a common name found on churches, monasteries and towns in Greece to honor the Virgin Mary.

Megali Panagia may refer to:

- Megali Panagia, Chalkidiki, a village in Chalkidiki peninsula and seat of old Panagia municipality
- Church of Megali Panagia, a church built on the site of Hadrian's Library in Athens, now in ruins
