= Lagonisi (disambiguation) =

Lagonisi (Greek: Λαγονήσι) may refer to the following places in Greece:

- Lagonisi, a seaside residential area of the municipality of Saronikos, Attica
- Lagonisi (island), an island off the coast of Andros, Greece in the Cyclades
- Lagonisi, a beach village near Agios Nikolaos, Chalkidiki
