= Assa (Chalcidice) =

Ancient Greek town

Coordinates: 40°22′09″N 23°49′50″E

Assa (Ancient Greek: Ἄσσα), also known as Assera (Ἄσσηρα), was a town of Chalcidice, in ancient Macedonia, on the Singitic Gulf.

It is cited by Herodotus as one of the cities—together with Pilorus, Singus and Sarte—located near Mount Athos which Xerxes ordered to open a channel through which his fleet passed, and from which he recruited troops in his expedition of the year 480 BCE against Greece.

It belonged to the Delian League since it appears in the tribute registry of Athens from 454/3 to 433/2 BCE.

Pliny the Elder calls the town Cassera, and its territory was called Assyrytis (Ἀσσυρῦτις) by Aristotle. Here was a river which was called the Psychrus or Psychros (Ψυχρός), from its coldness. It was also known by the name Asseros.

Its site is tentatively located near modern Pergadikia.

The name Assa is today used for a never built settlement. Located just north of the village of Pyrgadikia close to the ancient town, the settlement was planned to house summerhouses but construction was never formalized.
