= Agios Nikolaos, Chalkidiki =

Agios Nikolaos Άγιος Νικόλαος
- Community
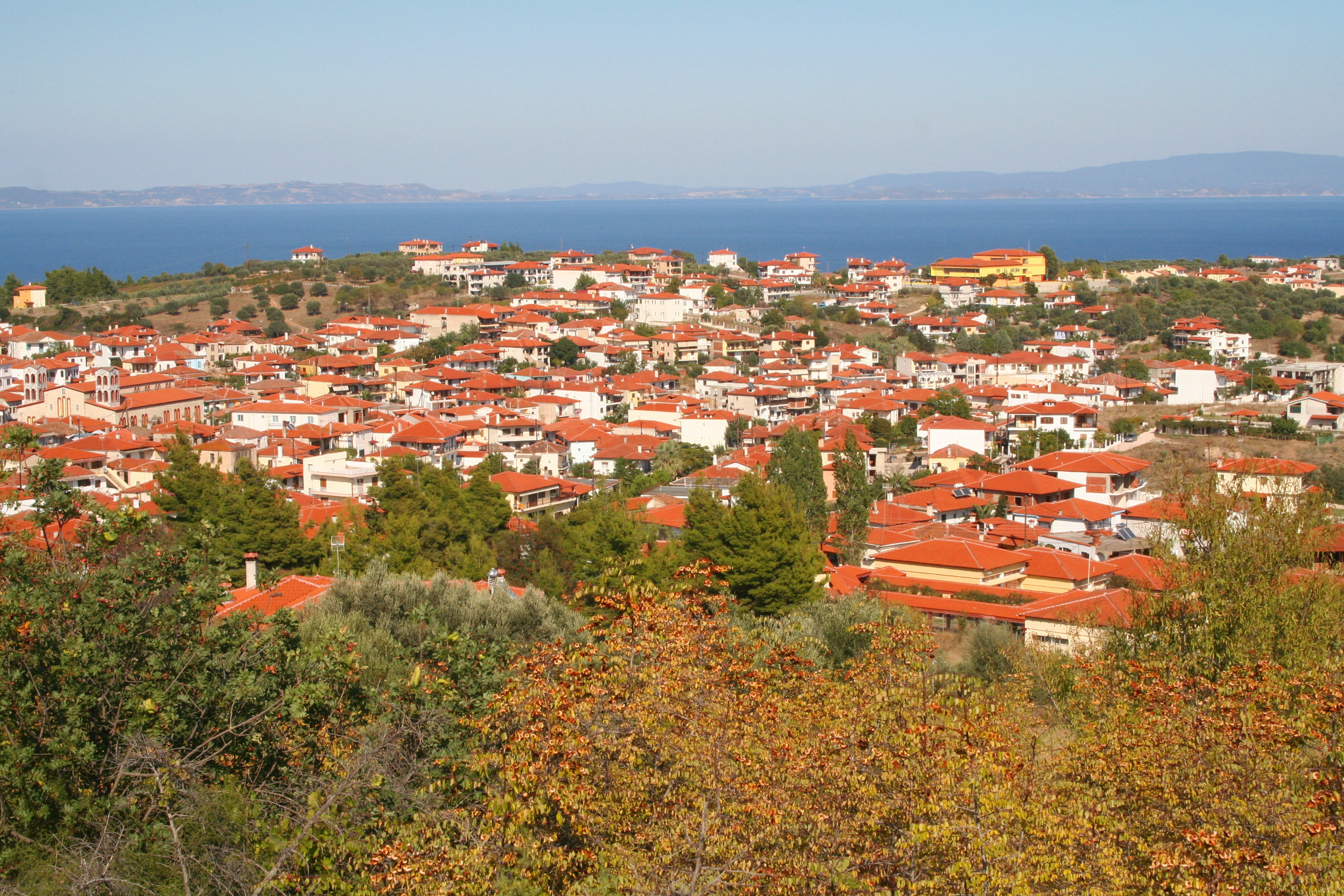

- Location within Greece
- Coordinates: 40°14.9′N 23°41.6′E
- Country: Greece
- Administrative region: Central Macedonia
- Regional unit: Chalkidiki
- Municipality: Sithonia
- Municipal unit: Sithonia
- Elevation: 90 m (300 ft)

Population (2021)
  - Community: 1,965
- Time zone: UTC+2 (EET)
  - Summer (DST): UTC+3 (EEST)
- Postal code: 630 78
- Area code: 23750
- Vehicle registration: XK

Agios Nikolaos (Greek: Άγιος Νικόλαος, meaning Saint Nicholas) is a village located 110 kilometers south-east of Thessaloniki on the Chalkidiki peninsula in Macedonia, Greece.

== Geography ==
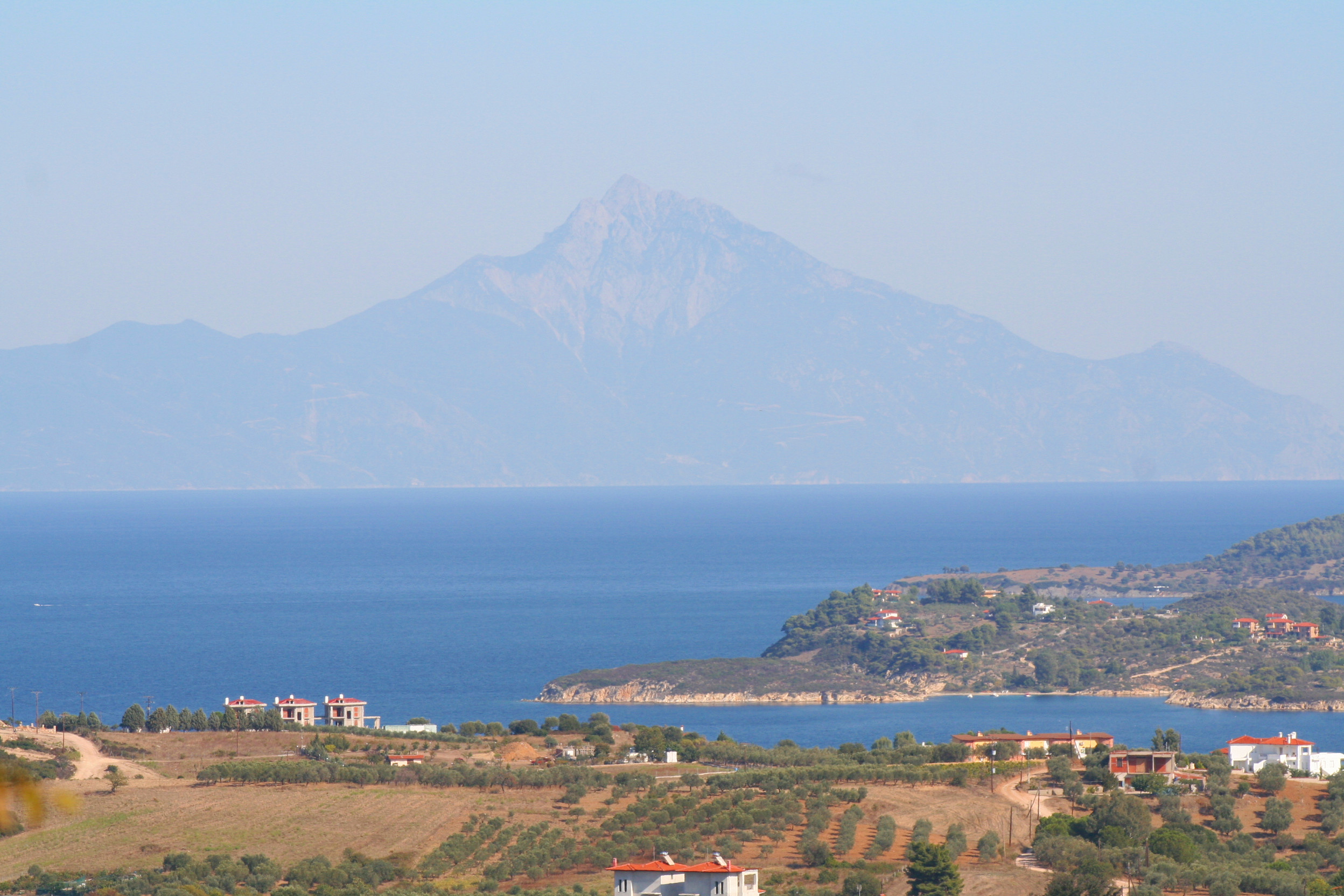
Agios Nikolaos

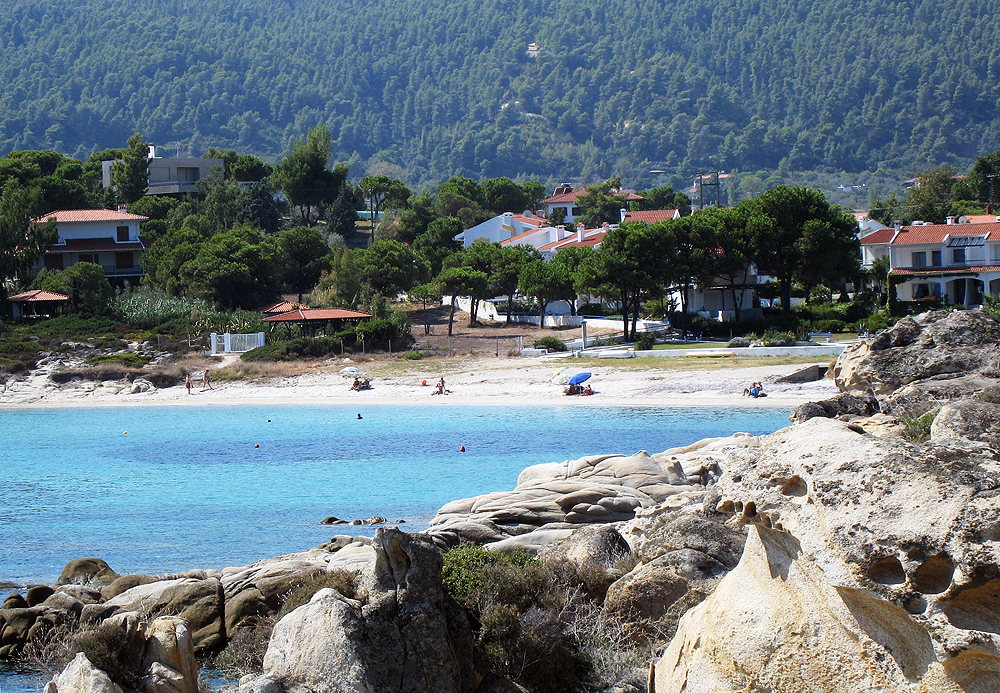
Vourvourou beach in Sithonia.

The village Agios Nikolaos itself is 2 km inland from the Singitic Gulf. However, its territory is quite extensive. To the north-east it borders the village of Pyrgadikia at Salonikiou Beach (8 km from Agios Nikolaos). To the north it borders the village of Metangitsi. In the west and south-west it is neighboring the village of Nikiti (9 km from Agios Nikolaos). To the south it borders the village of Sarti at Armenistis Beach (28 km from Agios Nikolaos).

=== Landscapes ===
Agios Nikolaos' landscapes show a substantial variability.

In the plains east and south-east of the village agriculture predominates with olive trees as the main cultivated plant. Toward the south, rises the Itamos mountain range of Sithonia and is completely covered with pine forest. Towards its northeastern extension (Salonikiou Beach) significant parts of the village territory are covered with forests. In all parts of the village territory plains or smooth hill segments are devoted to agriculture.

On the beaches there are hotels and pensions as well as individual homes that have been built since the 1980s.

The highest point within Agios Nikolaos territory is mount Karvounas (height approx. 550 m) in the south-west (Vourvourvou).

=== Settlements ===
A couple of coastal settlements belong to Agios Nikolaos, these are:

- Vourvourou – located 10 km south-east. Vourvourou is a village near Agios Nikolaos, in the Chalkidiki peninsula of northern Greece. It is best known as a holiday destination. Close to Vourvourou are the beaches of Karidi and Fteroti. Diasporos island is very close to Vourvourou.
- Salonikiou Beach – located 8 km north-east. Salonikiou is the area around the beach of Salonikiou on the northeast coast of Sithonia, between Ormos Panagias and Pyrgadikia. The closest village is Metangitsi (4 km inland). Most of the buildings in the region are private villas but there are some studios and apartments to rent. The beach is more than 1 km long.
- Ormos Panagias – located 4 km east/south-east, serves as the village port. Ormos Panagias is an important port for Sithonia, Halkidiki. Considered as being a part of Agios Nikolaos, the port of Ormos Panagias is located just a few kilometres to the south. The amount of accommodation and restaurants that have been built around this harbour has made it grow into somewhat of a village on its own, built around an existing old church. Even though it is not officially recognized as a village, Ormos Panagias is considered a Halkidiki resort in its own right that attracts many people. Tourist boat tours of Mount Athos and it's monasteries leave from this port.

== Population ==
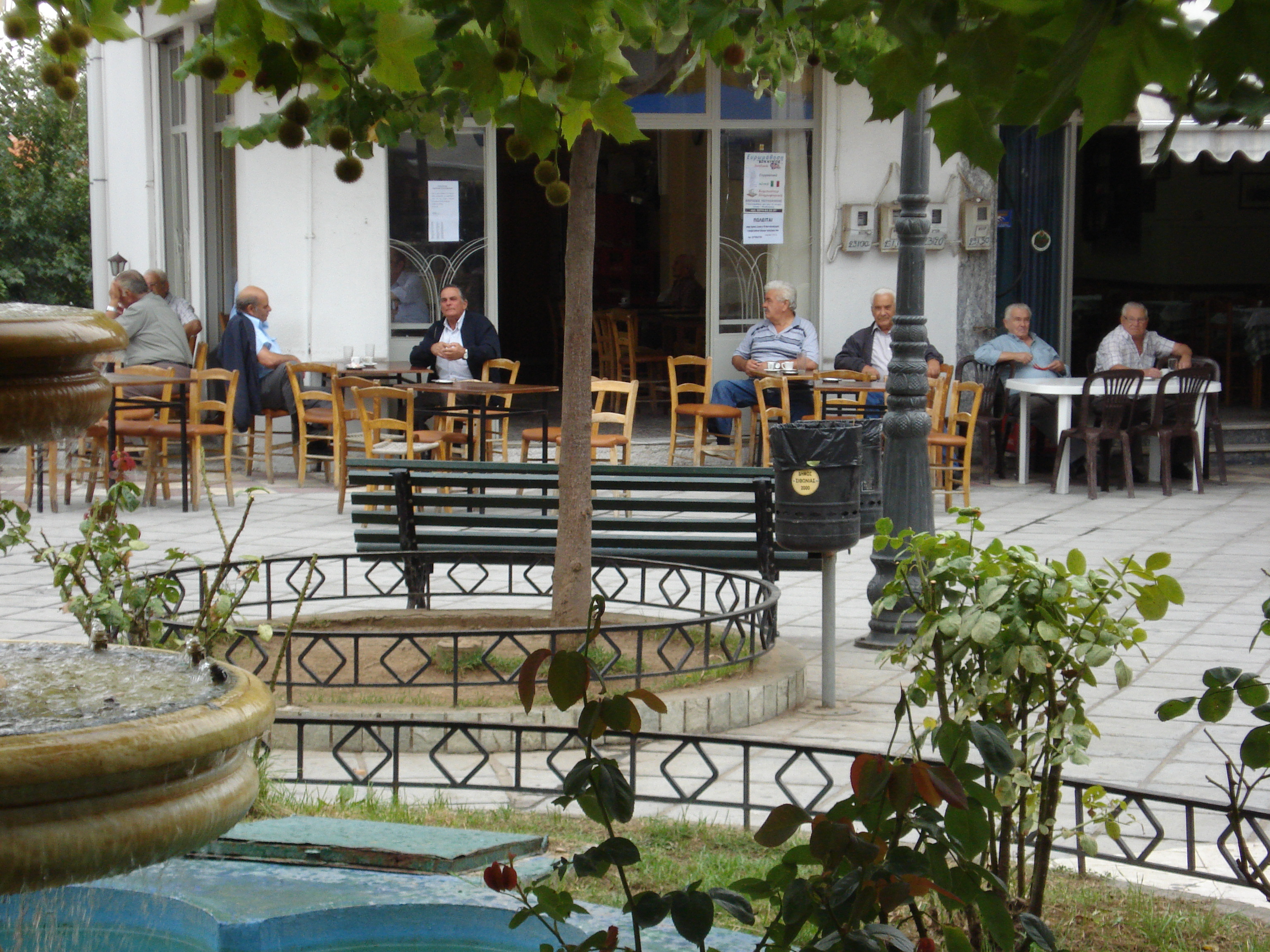
Traditional kafeneion in Agios Nikolaos.

The community of Agios Nikolaos, which includes the settlements of Agios Nikolaos, Vourvourou, Salonikiou Beach, and Ormos Panagias, has 1,965 residents (2021 census). Almost all inhabitants are indigenous Greeks. After the rise of tourism, some non-Greeks have settled permanently in Agios Nikolaos, for example, Germans, Dutch, and Austrians.

During the summer holiday period, the population may rise to 10,000.

== Economy ==
Traditionally, inhabitants of Agios Nikolaos had two economic mainstays: agriculture and fishery. Agriculture was mostly devoted to olive trees (and olive oil production), wheat, and winery. Fishery was limited to the waters of the Singitic Gulf.

Since the 1980s, tourism replaced fishery and agriculture as economic mainstay. Inhabitants have built own hotels, homes, and pensions or sold-off their agricultural land for real estate purposes. Concomitantly, living standards have risen significantly.

== History ==
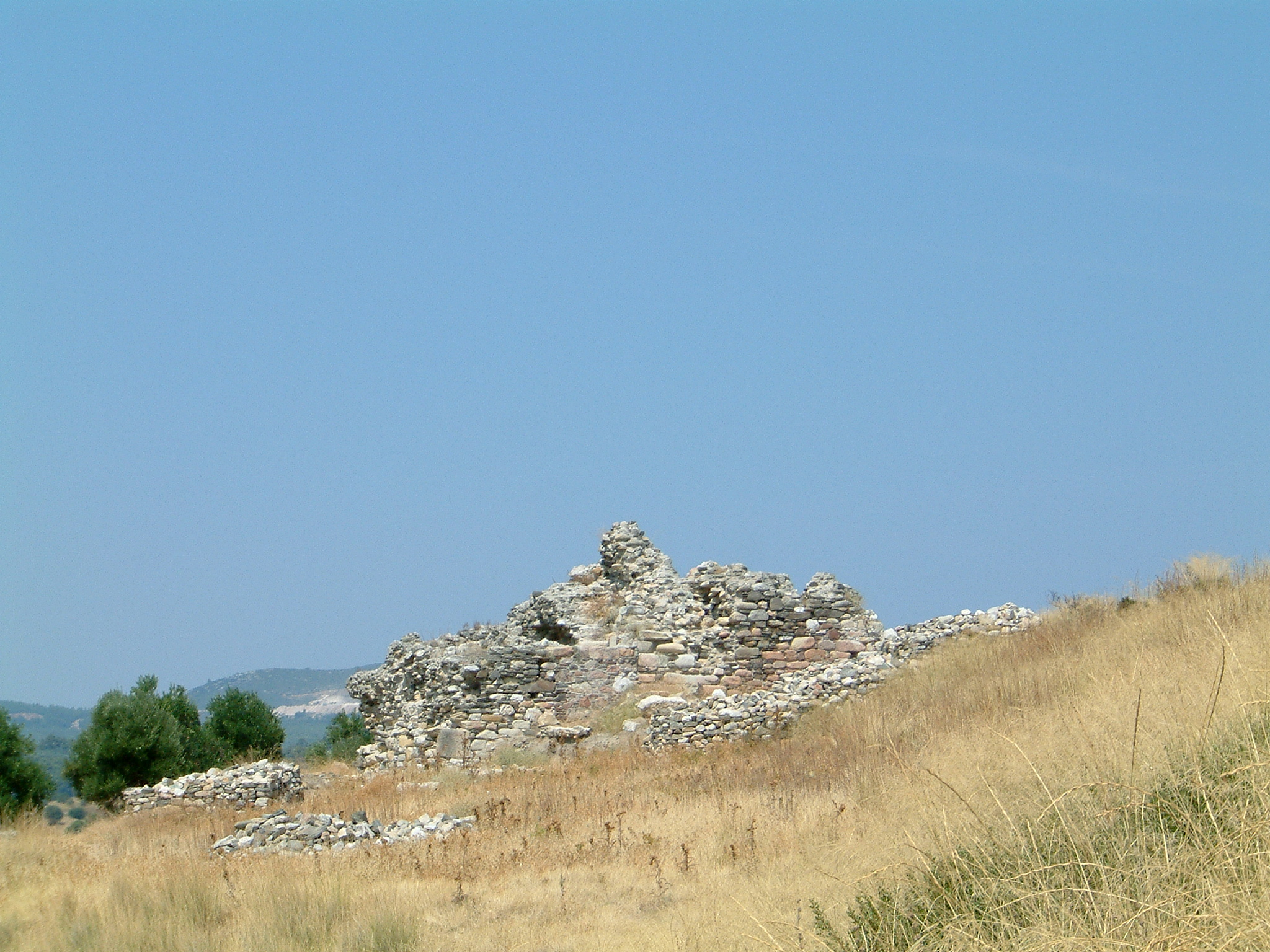
Ruins of a watchtower (possibly of Byzantine origin) at Pirgos beach, Agios Nikolaos.

The ancient Greek city of Singos, which gave its name to the Singitic Gulf, was located within Agios Nikolaos' territory and dates back to 454 BCE. It was probably near the Vourvourou bay on Livari peninsula, where an ancient wall of large stones is still visible (Mega Teichos). Individual reports even mention remains of an ancient port at the very same location. No excavation was performed to confirm position and location of ancient Singos and significant remains of buildings are not evident.

The village's history dates back to the 14th century when inhabitants moved inland from the sea because of repeated attacks by pirates. A likely position of a previous settlement can be found 2 km away on the coast at Pyrgos Beach, where remains of a watchtower presumably of Byzantine Greek origin can be found.

Agios Nikolaos fell under Ottoman Turkish rule from the 15th century until liberation in the Balkan Wars of 1912. The town suffered further in the 1940s during World War Two and fighting in the Greek Civil War.

After the 1950s, peaceful times returned and the Agios Nikolaos area saw a tourism boom from the 1980s onwards which increased prosperity in the region. Many villagers built summer homes in the coastal areas of Ormos Panagias and Vourvourou.

== Infrastructure ==
=== Public facilities ===
Agios Nikolaos has following public facilities:

- police station
- health center (equal to a very small hospital)
- pharmacies
- post office
- ATM
- radio station
- volunteer firefighters station

Agios Nikolaos does not have a bank. The nearest bank is located in Nikiti (9 km away).

=== Transportation ===
Agios Nikolaos lies adjacent to the road leading from Nikiti to Sarti (Sithonia west ring) and from Nikiti to Pyrgadikia (semicircular road around Singitikos bay leading east). All roads are covered with concrete or asphalt.

There is no link to a railroad. (Chalkidiki has no railroad at all).

Ormos Panagias serves as port of Agios Nikolaos. Daily cruises to Mount Athos' west coast take off from that port. It serves also as home port of the village's fishery boats.

Air traffic is managed by the international airport of Thessaloniki. Bus traffic is the mainstay of public transport in Agios Nikolaos, as in Chalkidiki as a whole. Daily connections to Thessaloniki, Sarti, Polygyros, and Nea Moudania exist. In the summer, at least 3 buses a day do provide transportation, whereas in the winter bus frequency is lower.

=== Architecture ===
Agios Nikolaos is primarily a traditionally built village with characteristic Macedonian architecture. However, a lot of traditional homes and houses have been replaced with modern ones. This is partially due to a higher standard of living as well as to stricter building standard because of earthquake concerns.

== Sightseeing ==
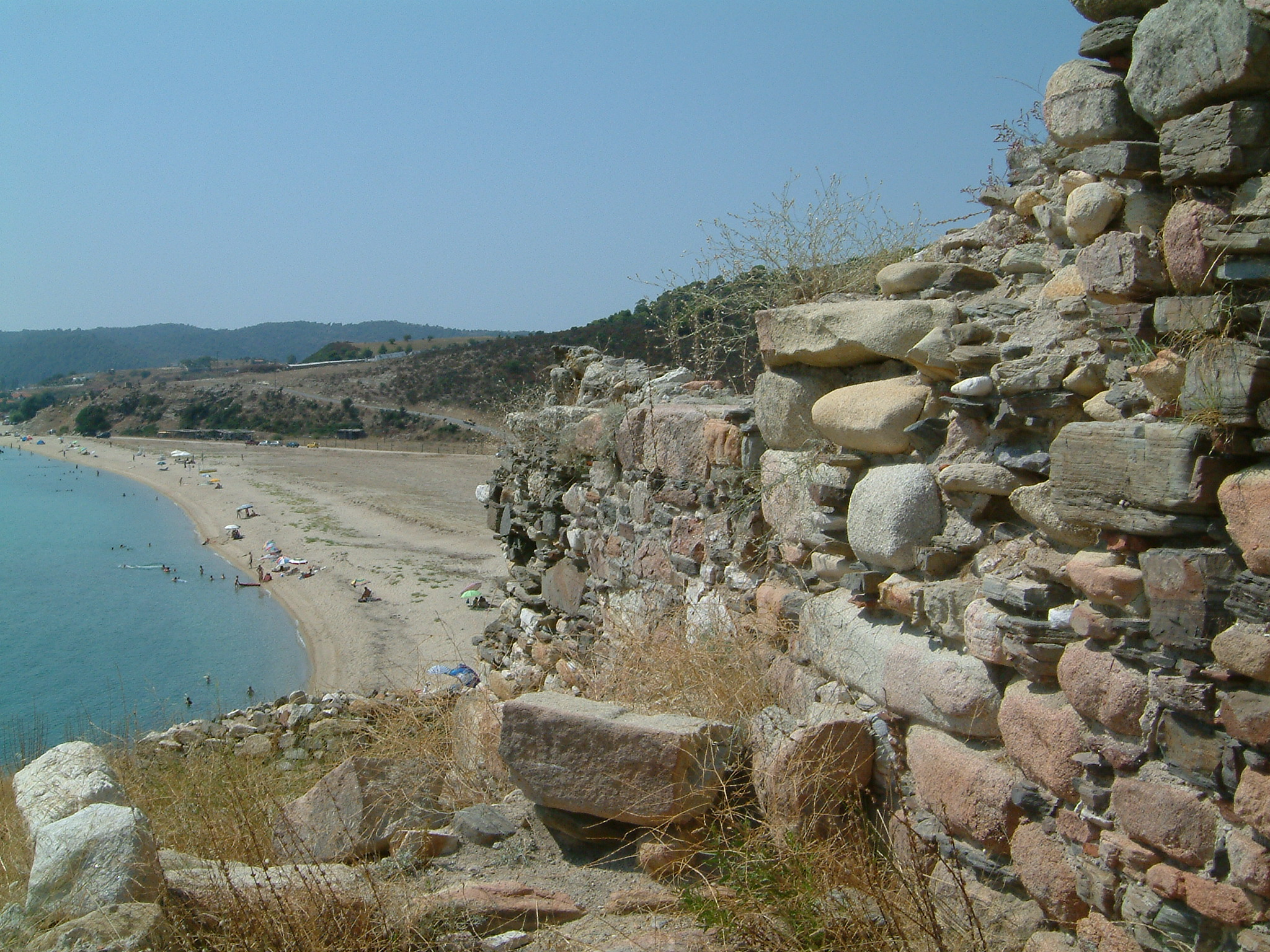
Pirgos Beach, Agios Nikolaos.

Ancient remains in the area are not noteworthy. However, one may want to take a look at:

- Byzantine watch tower at Pyrgos Beach (only ruins visible)
- Ancient Mega Teichos at Vourvourou (Livari)
- The village of Agios Nikolaos has traditional architecture
- The central square (πλατεία) of Agios Nikolaos is surrounded by restaurants and cafes and is especially busy on summer nights.
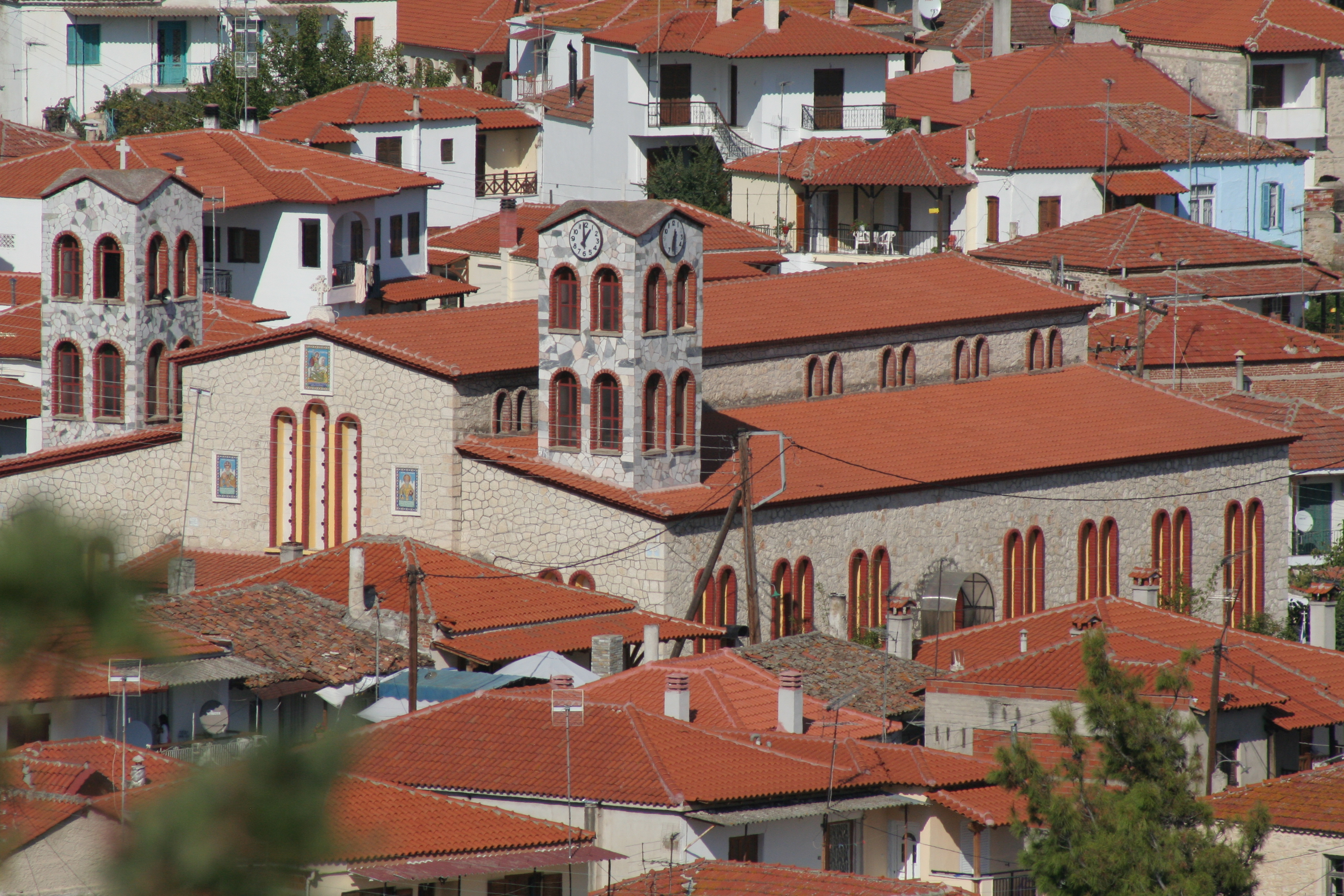

Agios Nikolaos is full of noteworthy beaches, as there are:

- Salonikiou Beach
- Pyrgos Beach
- Livrochio Beach
- Latoura Beach
- Lagonisi Beach
- Livari Beach
- Vourvourou Beach
- Karidi Beach
- Zografou Beach
- Galana Nera, a beach located between Diaporos and Agios Isidoros.

Beside the beaches, the bay of Vourvourou has approx. 9 islands giving it a lagoon appearance.

- Diaporos Island, largest island, partially inhabited
- Agios Isidoros, the most eastern island

All islands and islands' beaches can only be reached by boat.
