= Sarta (Chalcidice) =

Maritime town in ancient Macedonia

Coordinates: 40°05′15″N 23°58′43″E

Sarta or Sarte (Ancient Greek: Σάρτη) was a maritime town on the Sithonia peninsula of Chalcidice, in ancient Macedonia, on the Singitic Gulf between Singus and the promontory of Ampelus.

It is cited by Herodotus as one of the cities—together with Pilorus, Singus, and Assa—located near Mount Athos, which Xerxes ordered to open a channel through which his fleet passed, and from which he recruited troops in his expedition of the year 480 BCE against Greece.

It belonged to the Delian League, since it appears in the tribute registry of Athens from 434/3 to 415/4 BCE.

Its site is located about 1 mile (1.6 km) south of modern Sarti.
