= Singus =

Town of Sithonia in the Chalcidice in ancient Macedonia

Coordinates: 40°14′57″N 23°43′17″E

Singus or Singos (Ancient Greek: Σίγγος) was a town of Sithonia in the Chalcidice in ancient Macedonia, upon the gulf to which it gave its name, the Singitic Gulf (Σιγγιτικὸς κόλπος).

It is cited by Herodotus as one of the cities, along with Assa, Pilorus and Sarta, located near Mount Athos, which Xerxes had ordered to open a channel through which his fleet passed. From these cities he recruited troops, in his expedition of the year 480 BCE against Greece.

It belonged to the Delian League since it appears in the tribute registry of Athens from 454/3 to 433/2 BCE. In the Peace of Nicias of 421 BCE it was stipulated that the inhabitants of Mecyberna, Sane and Singus would live in their own cities under the same conditions as the Olyntihans and Acanthians, which has been interpreted by some historians as Singus was one of the cities that had undergone synoecism with Olynthus in the revolt that took place in the year 432 BCE, and that in the peace treaty it was re-established that it should be independent from Olynthus. Strabo writes that Singus was in ruins in his time.

Its site is 1 mile (1.6 km) east of modern Agios Nikolaos.
