= Panagia, Chalkidiki =

Panagia Παναγία
- Municipal unit
- Location within the regional unit

- Location within Greece
- Coordinates: 40°26′N 23°41′E
- Country: Greece
- Administrative region: Central Macedonia
- Regional unit: Chalkidiki
- Municipality: Aristotelis

Area
  - Municipal unit: 204.903 km^{2} (79.113 sq mi)

Population (2021)
  - Municipal unit: 3,126
  - Municipal unit density: 15.26/km^{2} (39.51/sq mi)
- Time zone: UTC+2 (EET)
  - Summer (DST): UTC+3 (EEST)
- Postal code: 630 76
- Area code: +30-2372
- Vehicle registration: XK

Panagia (Greek: Παναγία) is a former municipality in Chalkidiki, Greece. Since the 2011 local government reform it is part of the municipality Aristotelis, of which it is a municipal unit. The 2021 census recorded 3,126 inhabitants in the municipal unit. The municipal unit of Panagia covers an area of 204.903 km^{2} (79.113 sq mi).

== Administrative division ==
The municipal unit of Panagia consists of 3 communities:

- Gomati
- Megali Panagia
- Pyrgadikia

The seat of the municipality was in Megali Panagia.

== See also ==
- List of settlements in Chalkidiki
