= Ormos Panagias =

Village in Sithonia, Greece

Coordinates: 40°14′05″N 23°43′50″E

Ormos Panagias (Greek: Όρμος Παναγίας) is a coastal village of Sithonia in Chalkidiki, Greece. Located between Kassandra and Mount Athos, Ormos Panagias is considered by some to be the port of the village of Agios Nikolaos, which is only a few kilometres away.

Ormos Panagias is a popular vacation spot because of its secluded seaside location, and nearby beaches such as Orange Beach (around 20 kilometres [12 mi] from Ormos Panagias).
