= Denial and deception =

Framework in military intelligence theory

Denial and deception (D&D) is a Western theoretical framework for conceiving and analyzing military intelligence techniques pertaining to secrecy and deception. Originating in the 1980s, it is roughly based on the more pragmatic Soviet practices of maskirovka (which preceded the D&D conceptualization by decades) but it has a more theoretical approach.

== Description ==
In the D&D framework, denial and deception are seen as distinct but complementary endeavors. Denial most often involves security and concealment to prevent foreign agents, photographic surveillance, electronic monitoring, or even the media from revealing secretive diplomatic or military matters. Deception is the construction of a false reality for the adversary through intentionally "leaked" false information, false stories implanted in the media, dummy or decoy structures or military formations, or numerous other measures. For example, in the Japanese information warfare campaign that preceded the Japanese attack on Pearl Harbor, the D&D approach identifies as a denial measure the twice-repeated change in naval call signs effected by the Imperial Navy between 1 November and 1 December, but identifies as a deception measure the Japanese Foreign Office announcement that a large Japanese liner would sail to California on 2 December to evacuate Japanese citizens.

== Coordinated plan ==
A denial and deception campaign is most effective when numerous denial and deceptive efforts are coherently coordinated to advance a specific plan; however, the most effective such operations are very complex, involving numerous persons or organizations, and this can prove exceedingly difficult. A single failed denial measure or deception can easily jeopardize an entire operation.

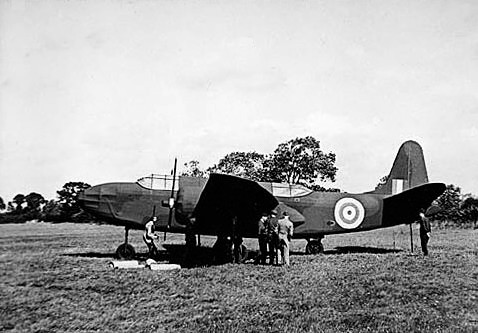
Dummy aircraft, like the one pictured (modelled after the Douglas A-20 Havoc) were used in the deception tactics of Operation Fortitude during World War II.

== Mearsheimer ==
According to political scientist John J. Mearsheimer (Why Leaders Lie), during peaceful times, inter-state deceptions have little traction as the level of trust between states is usually already very low and therefore being caught in a lie would be ruinous. According to Mearsheimer, freely elected officials are often more likely to use such strategies than authoritarian dictators, who tend to rely more on intimidation and threats. Freely elected leaders who move up the ranks by employing political deception are not only familiar with deceiving the public for personal gain but also have considerable political capital and public trust following their election. With this comparatively high level of trust, political leaders are the most likely to successfully target the public with deceptions, particularly with fearmongering. According to Mearsheimer, in the weeks leading up to the Iraq War, "the [George W.] Bush administration engaged in a deception campaign to inflate the threat posed by Saddam.” Following this successful deception, the administration was able to launch the Iraq War with little opposition.

== Shulsky ==
According to Abram Shulsky, democracies, like the United States, had difficulty employing denial and deception campaigns. This is largely due to the open media of most such societies which frequently expose any major operations undertaken militarily or diplomatically. Also, legal restrictions tend to hamper governments and particularly intelligence services in democratic societies. The exception to these restrictions occurs in wartime, when some measure of martial law is imposed and legal impediments are relaxed. Authoritarian systems of government, however, frequently employ denial and deception campaigns both domestically and abroad to manipulate domestic opposition and foreign governments. These operations are unhampered by legal restrictions or an open media. Non-state actors, such as terrorist organizations, frequently use denial and deception to influence governments and the public opinion of target societies. Other authors illustrate the D&D topic with Operation Fortitude and consider it one of the most successful such examples in history. According to Donald C.F. Daniel, democratic societies have more qualms with deception than they have with denial (in the technical sense used in this article); Daniel contrasts the little public controversy that surrounded the secretive way in which Nixon's rapprochement with China was negotiated (as example of secrecy/denial that did not cause a public outrage) with the uproar caused by the 2001 announcement of the creation of the Office of Strategic Influence (an institution that had among its stated goals the planting of false stories in the foreign press).

== United States Department of Defense ==
According to United States Department of Defense definitions, military deception includes both denial and deception (as defined in the D&D framework). Canadian OPSEC officer John M. Roach notes that "Deception used as a broad, general term includes the elements of both denial and deception, each having distinct actions that are either active or passive." D&D is not the only terminology used to make this distinction; according to Roach "passive deception" is another technical term for denial. Western writers see the Soviet (and post-Soviet) maskirovka practices as not drawing a sharp or significant distinction between the two components of denial and deception. The Islamic concepts of kitman and taqiyya, or at least the jihadist interpretations thereof, have been seen by Westerners as the equivalents of the two components of denial and (respectively) deception. Since taqiyya is a word with Shiite connotations, Sunni militants sometimes prefer to use the word iham instead, roughly with the meaning "deception of unbelievers". Although the Chinese deception theory literature is vast and uses rather different terminology (relative to Western works), some recent surveys have identified that "seduction"—understood as convincing the enemy to make fatal mistakes—is considered the highest form of deception while confusing or denying information to the enemy are considered lesser forms.

== See also ==
- Defense in depth
- Disinformation
- False flag
- Plausible deniability
- Russian military deception
