= Russian military deception =

Russian military doctrine

Russian military deception, sometimes known as maskirovka (Russian: маскировка, lit. 'masking, disguise'), is a military doctrine developed from the start of the 20th century. The doctrine covers a broad range of measures for military deception, from camouflage to denial and deception.

Deceptive measures include concealment, imitation with decoys and dummies, manoeuvres intended to deceive, denial, and disinformation. The 1944 Soviet Military Encyclopedia refers to "means of securing combat operations and the daily activities of forces; a complexity of measures, directed to mislead the enemy regarding the presence and disposition of forces". Later versions of the doctrine also include strategic, political, and diplomatic means including manipulation of "the facts", situation, and perceptions to affect the media and opinion around the world, so as to achieve or facilitate tactical, strategic, national and international goals.

Deception contributed to major Soviet victories including the Battle of Stalingrad, the Battle of Kursk, and Operation Bagration (in Belarus): in these cases, surprise was achieved despite very large concentrations of force, both in attack and in defence. The doctrine has also been put into practice in peacetime, with denial and deception operations in events such as the Cuban Missile Crisis, the Prague Spring, and the annexation of Crimea.

== Development of the doctrine ==
The Russian doctrine of military deception has evolved with time, and it encompasses a number of meanings. The Russian term маскировка, maskirovka literally means masking. An early military meaning was camouflage, soon extended to battlefield masking using smoke and other methods of screening. From there it came to have the broader meaning of military deception, widening to include denial and deception.

=== Historical antecedents ===
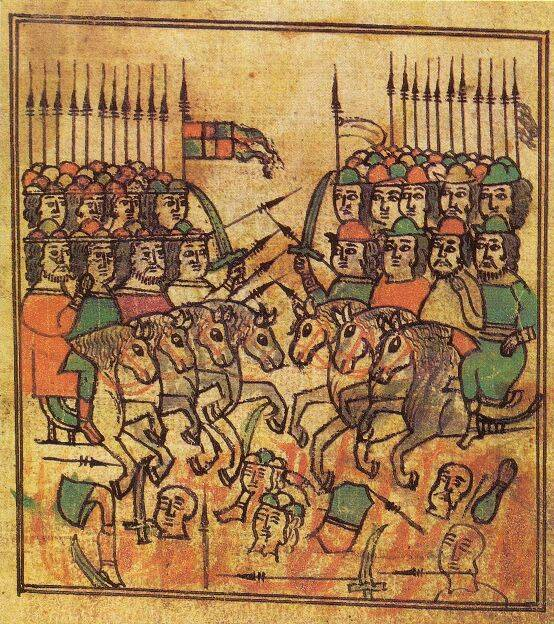
In the Battle of Kulikovo in 1380, Dmitry Donskoy's Muscovite army defeated a much larger Mongol army using surprise.

The practice of military deception predates Russia. The Art of War, written in the 5th century BC and attributed to the ancient Chinese military strategist Sun Tsu, describes a strategy of deception: "I will force the enemy to take our strength for weakness, and our weakness for strength, and thus will turn his strength into weakness". Early in Russia's history, in the Battle of Kulikovo in 1380, Prince Dmitry Donskoy defeated the armies of the Mongol Golden Horde using a surprise attack from a regiment hidden in forest. The tactics of that battle are still cited in Russian cadet schools.

=== Before World War II ===
The Russian Army had a deception school, active in 1904, disbanded in 1929. Meanwhile, military deception was developed as a military doctrine in the 1920s. The 1924 Soviet directive for higher commands stated that operational deception had to be "based upon the principles of activity, naturalness, diversity, and continuity and includes secrecy, imitation, demonstrative actions, and disinformation."

The 1929 Field Regulations of the Red Army stated that "surprise has a stunning effect on the enemy. For this reason all troop operations must be accomplished with the greatest concealment and speed." Concealment was to be attained by confusing the enemy with movements, camouflage and use of terrain, speed, use of night and fog, and secrecy. "Thus 'in Soviet military art during the 1920s the theory of operational maskirovka was developed as one of the most important means of achieving surprise in operations.'"

The 1935 Instructions on Deep Battle and then the 1936 Field Regulations place increasing stress on battlefield deception. The Instructions define the methods of achieving surprise as air superiority; making forces mobile and manoeuvrable; concealing concentration of forces; keeping fire preparations secret; misleading the enemy; screening with smoke and technical deception; and using the cover of darkness. In the 1939 Russian invasion of Finland, white winter camouflage was worn by Soviet troops.

=== 1944 concept ===
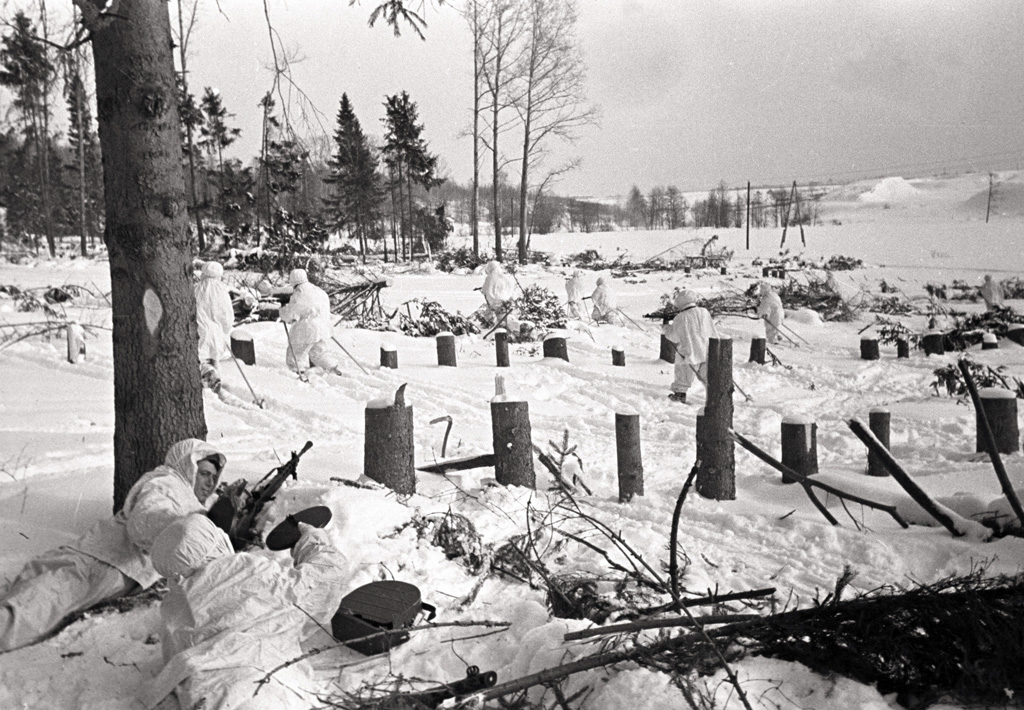
Early usage: Red Army soldiers in snow camouflage near Moscow, December 1941. RIA Novosti image 284

The 1944 Soviet Military Encyclopedia defines military deception as the means of securing combat operations and the daily activities of forces; misleading the enemy about the presence and disposition of forces, objectives, combat readiness and plans. It asserts that it contributes to achieving surprise, preserving combat readiness and the survivability of objectives.

=== 1978 concept ===
The 1978 Soviet Military Encyclopedia defines deception similarly, placing additional stress on strategic levels, and explicitly including political, economic and diplomatic measures besides the military ones. It largely repeats the 1944 Encyclopedia's concept, but adds that

Strategic maskirovka is carried out at national and theater levels to mislead the enemy as to political and military capabilities, intentions and timing of actions. In these spheres, as war is but an extension of politics, (Note: A reference to the famous aphorism of Carl von Clausewitz, "War is the continuation of politics by other means.") it includes political, economic and diplomatic measures as well as military.

=== Modern doctrine ===
Russian military deception is broadly equated with maskirovka, but other Russian terms are also used in the area, including the "fog of war", tuman voyny. Khitrost means a commander's personal gift of cunning and guile, part of his military skill, whereas deception is practised by the whole organization and does not carry the sense of personal trickiness; nor need the Russian use of deception be thought of as "evil". Indeed, Michael Handel reminds readers, in the preface to the military analyst David Glantz's book, of Sun Tzu's claim in The Art of War that all warfare is based on deception; Handel suggests that deception is a normal and indeed necessary part of warfare. The goal of military deception is however surprise, vnezapnost, so the two are naturally studied together.

However, the military analyst William Connor cautioned that in the Soviet sense, the doctrine covered much more than camouflage and deception. It had, he suggested, the connotation of active control of the enemy. By the time of Operation Bagration in 1944, Connor argues, the Russian doctrine of military deception already included all these aspects. The meaning evolved in Soviet practice and doctrine to include strategic, political, and diplomatic objectives, in other words operating at all levels.

This differs from Western doctrines on deception, and from information warfare doctrines, by its emphasis on pragmatic aspects. According to the analyst James Hansen, deception "is treated as an operational art to be polished by professors of military science and officers who specialize in this area." In 2015, Julian Lindley-French described strategic maskirovka as "a new level of ambition" established by Moscow to unbalance the West both politically and militarily.

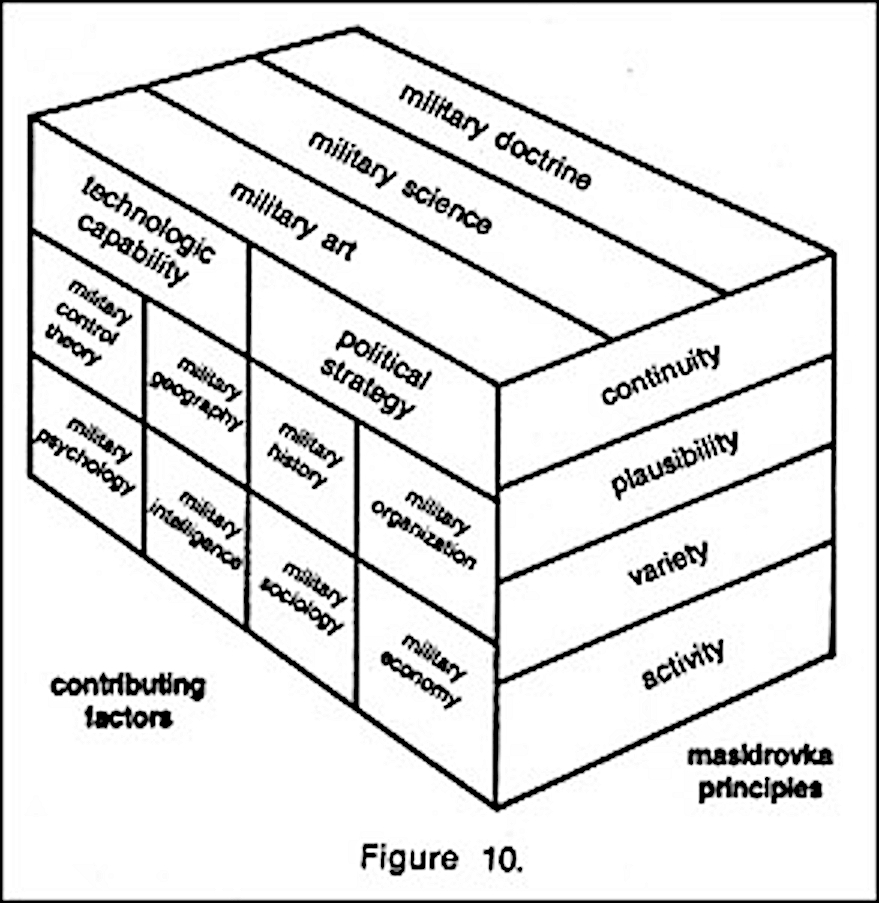
A Western view: Soviet military deception at different operational levels of war as theorized by the American defence researcher Charles Smith

In military intelligence, the Russian doctrine roughly corresponds to Western notions of denial and deception. The United States Army's Glossary of Soviet Military Terminology from 1955 defined maskirovka as "camouflage; concealment; disguise". The International Dictionary of Intelligence from 1990 defined it as the Russian military intelligence (GRU) term for deception.

Robert Pringle's 2006 Historical Dictionary of Russian and Soviet Intelligence defined it as strategic deception. Scott Gerwehr's The Art of Darkness summarized it as deception and operational security. The historian Tom Cubbage commented that military deception was enormously successful for the Soviets, and whatever the United States might think, for the Soviet Union it was something to make use of both in war and in peacetime.

An article in The Moscow Times explained: "But маскировка has a broader military meaning: strategic, operational, physical and tactical deception. Apparently in U.S. military terminology, this is called either CC&D (camouflage, concealment and deception) or more recently D&D (denial and deception). It is the whole shebang—from guys in ski masks or uniforms with no insignia, to undercover activities, to hidden weapons transfers, to—well, starting a civil war but pretending that you've done nothing of the sort."

In his comprehensive study, Soviet Military Deception in the Second World War, Glantz summarized the Russian doctrine as involving both active and passive deception and surprise. For the Soviets, deception permeated all levels of war. And since they thought of war as just an extension of politics by other means, deception could and should be used and constantly considered in politics before a war began, if it was to work effectively.

The American defence researcher Charles Smith identified different dimensions of Russian military deception. He divided it into multiple types—optical, thermal, radar, radio, sound/silence; multiple environments—aquatic, space, atmosphere—each involving active or passive measures; and organizational aspects—mobility, level, and organization. The levels are the conventional military ones, strategic, operational, and tactical, while organization refers to the military branch concerned. Finally, Smith identified principles—plausibility, continuity through peace and war, variety, and persistent aggressive activity; and contributing factors, namely technological capability and political strategy.

Smith also analyzed the Soviet doctrine, considering it as "a set of processes designed to mislead, confuse, and interfere with accurate data collection regarding all areas of Soviet plans, objectives, and strengths or weaknesses".

Measures employed in Russian military deception
Measure	Russian name	Western equivalent	Techniques	Example
Concealment	сокрытие (Sokrytiye)	Camouflage	Awnings, smoke screens, nets, radio silence	Building tanks in an automobile plant
Imitation	имитация (Imitatsiya)	Mimicry	Decoys, military dummies	Dummy tanks with radar reflectors; decoy bridges created by a line of floating radar reflectors
Simulation	симуляция (Simulyatsiya)	Simulation	Decoys, etc.	Dummy artillery battery complete with noise and smoke
Disinformation	дезинформация (Dezinformatsiya)	Disinformation		False letters; untrue information to journalists; inaccurate maps; false orders; orders with false dates
Demonstrative manoeuvres	демонстративные маневры (Demonstrativnyye manevry)	Feints	False trails	Attacks away from the main thrust; pontoon bridges away from attack routes

== In practice ==
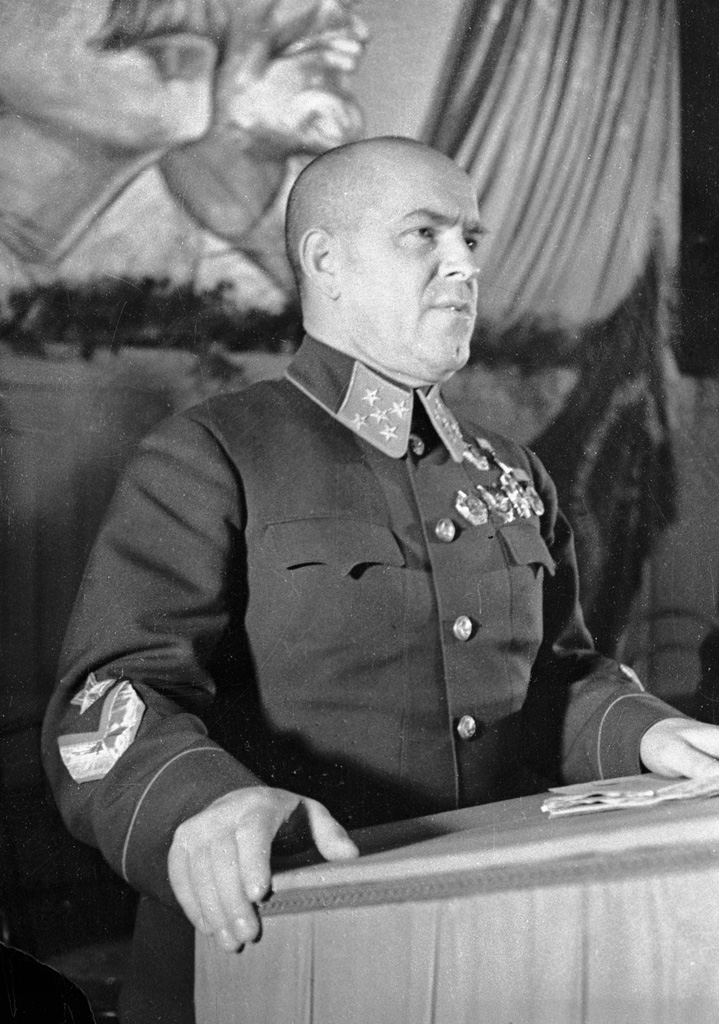
Georgy Zhukov was a leading proponent of Soviet military deception.

=== Beginnings ===
The Battle of Kulikovo in 1380 was cited by Smith as an early example of the successful use of deception; a regiment had hidden in the forest, and the battle is seen as the beginning of the freeing of the Russian lands from Tatar rule.

At least three elements, namely deception, concealment, and disinformation with false defensive works and false troop concentrations, were used by Georgy Zhukov in the 1939 Battles of Khalkhin Gol against Japan. The deceptions included apparent requests for material for bunkers, the broadcasting of the noise of pile-drivers and wide distribution of a pamphlet What the Soviet Soldier Must Know in Defence. In his memoirs Zhukov described them as such, noting that they were worked out at army group or "operational-tactical" level.

=== Rzhev-Vyazma, 1942 ===
The first offensive to have its own deception operation was in Zhukov's part of the attack on the Rzhev-Vyazma salient to the west of Moscow in July and August 1942. The offensive was conducted by Ivan Konev's Kalinin Front on the north, and Zhukov's Western Front with 31st Army and 20th Army on the south. Zhukov decided to simulate a concentration of forces some 200 kilometres (120 mi) to the south near Yukhnov, in the sector of his 43rd, 49th and 50th Armies.

He created two deception operation staffs in that sector, and allocated 4 deception (maskirovka) companies, 3 rifle companies, 122 vehicles, 9 tanks and other equipment including radios for the deception. These forces built 833 dummy tanks, guns, vehicles, field kitchens and fuel tanks, and used their real and dummy equipment to simulate the unloading of armies from a railhead at Myatlevo, and the concentration of armour and motorized infantry as if preparing to attack Yukhnov. The radios communicated false traffic between the simulated armies and Front headquarters.

The real tanks and other vehicles made tracks like those of troop columns. When the Luftwaffe attacked, the deception units returned fire and lit bottles of fuel to simulate fires. The deception had the immediate effect of increasing Luftwaffe air strikes against the railhead and false concentration area, while the two railheads actually in use were not attacked, and the Wehrmacht moved three Panzer divisions and one motorized infantry division of XL Panzer Corps to the Yukhnov area. Meanwhile, the real troop concentration to the north was conducted at night and in thick forests.

Zhukov's attack began on 4 August, and the 20th and 31st Armies advanced 40 kilometres (25 mi) in two days. The Russians claimed that surprise had been achieved; this is confirmed by the fact that German intelligence failed to notice Zhukov's concentration of 20th and 31st Armies on Rzhev. Other small offensives on the same front had poorly planned and executed deception measures, but these were largely unsuccessful. The successful deception for the attack on Rzhev showed that military deception could be effective, but that only certain Red Army commanders applied it correctly.

=== Battle of Stalingrad, 1942–1943 ===
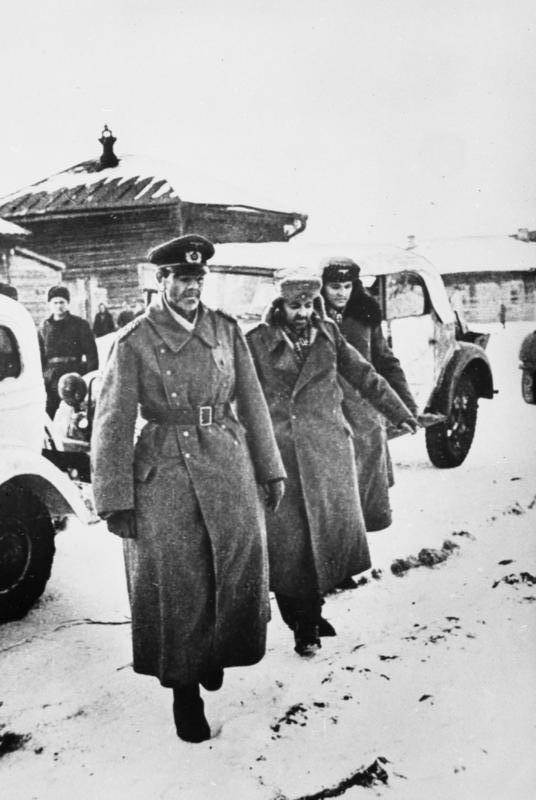
Successful deception: Field Marshal Friedrich Paulus (left), with his chief of staff Arthur Schmidt (centre) surrender the encircled German 6th Army at the end of the Battle of Stalingrad.

Military deception based on secrecy was critical in hiding Soviet preparations for the decisive Operation Uranus encirclement in the Battle of Stalingrad. In the historian Paul Adair's view, the successful November 1942 Soviet counter-attack at Stalingrad was the first instance of Stavka's newly discovered confidence in large-scale deception. Proof of the success of the Soviet deception came, Adair notes, from the Chief of the German General Staff, General Kurt Zeitzler, who claimed early in November that "the Russians no longer have any reserves worth mentioning and are not capable of launching a large-scale attack." This was two months before the German 6th Army capitulated.

Hitler's own self-deception played into this, as he was unwilling to believe that the Red Army had sufficient reserves of armour and men. Further, the many ineffective Red Army attacks to the north of Stalingrad had unintentionally given the impression that it was unable to launch any substantial attack, let alone a rapid army-scale pincer movement. Careful attention was paid to security, with greatly reduced radio traffic. The Germans failed to detect the creation of five new tank armies. Troop movements were successfully concealed by moving the armies up only at night, and camouflaging them by day on the open, treeless steppes.

Strategic deception included increasing military activity far away, near Moscow. At the sites of the planned attack, elaborate disinformation was fed to the enemy. Defence lines were built to deceive German tactical reconnaissance. Civilians within 25 kilometres (16 mi) of the front were evacuated, and trenches were dug around the villages for Luftwaffe reconnaissance to see. Conversely, along the uninvolved Voronezh Front, bridging equipment and boats were prepared to suggest an offensive there. The five real bridges that were built for the attack were masked by the construction of seventeen false bridges over the River Don.

Operation Uranus Deception: The German intelligence view on 18 November 1942, showing six to eight Soviet armies (red) near Stalingrad. A = Army

Operation Uranus Deception: The actual Soviet dispositions on 18 November 1942 (red), showing ten Soviet armies. A = Army, TA = Tank Army. Subsequent attacks 19–26 November 1942 (gray arrows)

To the south of Stalingrad, for the southern arm of the pincer movement, 160,000 men with 550 guns, 430 tanks and 14,000 trucks were ferried across the much larger River Volga, which was beginning to freeze over with dangerous ice floes, entirely at night. Overall, Stavka succeeded in moving a million men, 1000 tanks, 14,000 guns and 1400 aircraft into position without alerting their enemy.

Despite the correct appreciation by German air reconnaissance of a major build-up of forces on the River Don, the commander of the 6th Army, Friedrich Paulus took no action. He was caught completely by surprise, failing either to prepare his armour as a mobile reserve with fuel and ammunition, or to move it on the day of the attack. The historian David Glantz considered that the concealment of the scale of the offensive was the Red Army's "greatest feat".

=== Battle of Kursk, 1943 ===
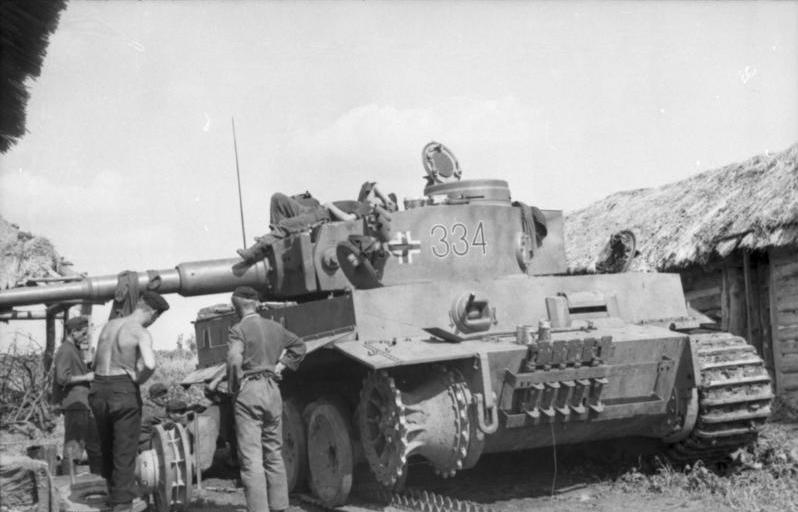
Unexpected minefields: a Tiger tank damaged by a mine early in the Battle of Kursk, under repair

Deception was put into practice on a large scale in the 1943 Battle of Kursk, especially on the Red Army's Steppe Front commanded by Ivan Konev. This was a deception for a defensive battle, as Hitler was planning to attack the Kursk salient in a pincer movement. The Soviet forces were moved into position at night and carefully concealed, as were the extensively prepared defences-in-depth, with multiple lines of defence, minefields, and as many as 200 anti-tank guns per mile. Soviet defences were quickly built up using deception techniques to conceal the flow of men and equipment.

This was accompanied by a whole suite of deception measures including feint attacks, false troop and logistics concentrations, radio deception, false airfields and false rumours. In mid-June 1943 German army high command (OKH) had estimated 1500 Soviet tanks in the Kursk salient, against the true figure of over 5100, and underestimated Soviet troop strength by a million. The historian Lloyd Clark observes that while the Wehrmacht was "feeding on intelligence scraps", the Soviets were "mastering maskirovka".

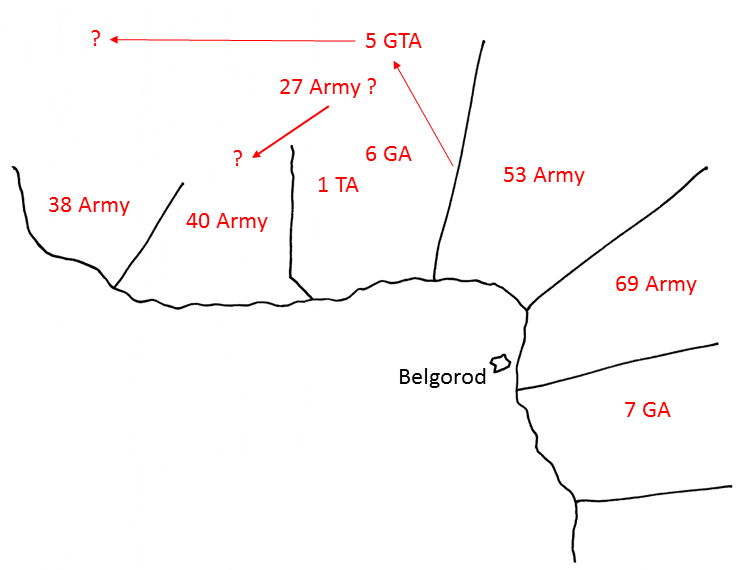
The German intelligence view of the Belgorod front, on the south of the Kursk salient, 2 August 1943 (GA: Guards Army; TA: Tank Army)

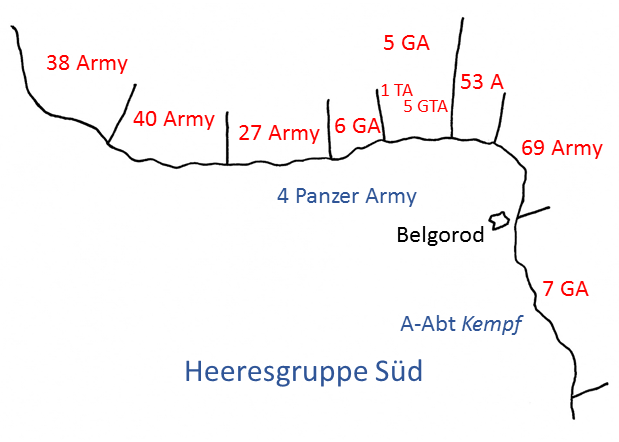
The actual Red Army dispositions on the Belgorod front, showing concentrated forces ahead of the 4th Panzer Army, 2 August 1943

The result was that the Germans attacked Russian forces far stronger than those they were expecting. The commander of the Soviet 1st Tank Army, Mikhail Katukov, remarked that the enemy "did not suspect that our well-camouflaged tanks were waiting for him. As we later learned from prisoners, we had managed to move our tanks forward unnoticed." Katukov's tanks were concealed in defensive emplacements prepared before the battle, with only their turrets above ground level. Glantz records that the German general Friedrich von Mellenthin wrote

The horrible counter-attacks, in which huge masses of manpower and equipment took part, were an unpleasant surprise for us ... The most clever camouflage of the Russians should be emphasized again. We did not ... detect even one minefield or anti-tank area until ... the first tank was blown up by a mine or the first Russian anti-tank guns opened fire.

=== Operation Bagration, 1944 ===
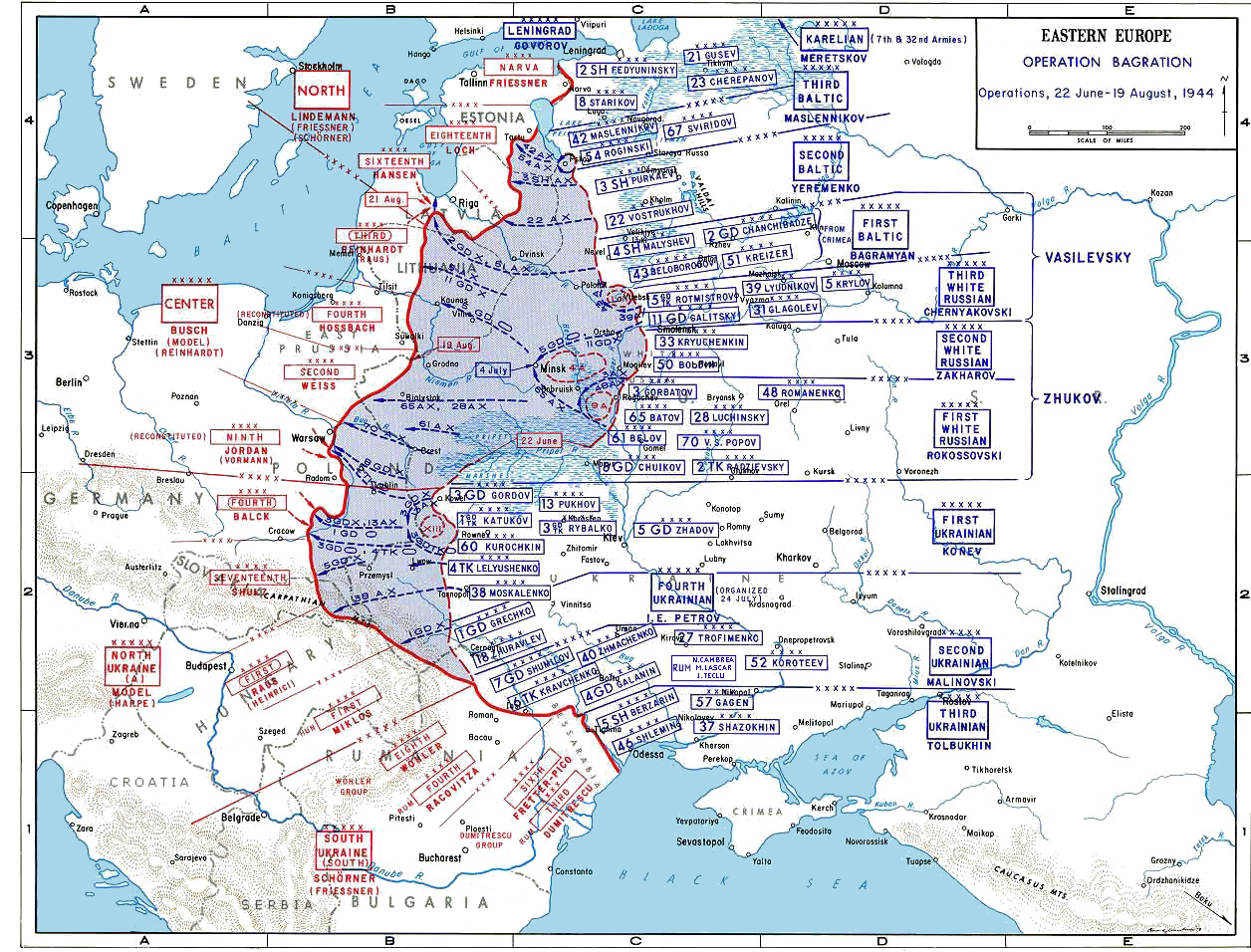
Operation Bagration spanned about 1000 kilometres from Estonia in the north to Romania in the south. The encirclements of three components of the German Army Group Centre at Minsk, Vitebsk and near Bobruisk are shown by dashed red lines in the middle of the area.

The 1944 Operation Bagration in Belarus applied the strategic aims and objectives on a grand scale, to deceive the Germans about the scale and objectives of the offensive. The historian Paul Adair commented that "Once the Stavka had decided upon the strategic plan for their 1944 summer offensive [Bagration], they began to consider how the Germans could be deceived about the aims and scale of the offensive ... the key to the maskirovka operation was to reinforce the German conviction that operations would continue along this [southern] axis".

In particular, the Stavka needed to be certain that the Germans believed the main Soviet attack would be in the south. The Soviet plan successfully kept the German reserves doing nothing south of the Pripyat marshes until the battle to the north in Belorussia had already been decided. Stavka succeeded in concealing the size and position of very large movements of supplies, as well as of forces including seven armies, eleven aviation corps and over 200,000 troop replacements. As for the strategic offensive itself, its location, strength and timing were effectively concealed. Stavka and the Red Army applied the doctrine of military deception at three levels:

- Strategic (theatre-wide): Stavka hid the location, strength, and timing of the attack, with dummy troop concentrations on the flanks displayed to the enemy before the battle, other offensives timed to work as diversions, and forces left where the enemy expected an attack (three tank armies in Ukraine), away from the true location of the attack (Belarus)
- Operational: the Red Army hid the locations, strengths and objectives of each force
- Tactical: each unit hid its concentrations of troops, armour and guns

The German Army Group Centre (where the main attack fell) underestimated Soviet infantry by 40%, mechanised forces by 300% and the number of tanks as 400 to 1800, instead of the 4000 to 5200 in fact arrayed against them. The German high command (OKH) and Adolf Hitler grossly underestimated the threat to Army Group Centre, confidently redeploying a third of its artillery, half its tank destroyers and 88% of its tanks to the Southern front where OKH expected the Soviet attack. Only 580 German armoured vehicles were in place for the battle.

In the battle, Army Group Centre was almost totally destroyed, losing its Fourth Army encircled east of Minsk, its 3rd Panzer Army (LIII Corps encircled in Vitebsk), and its Ninth Army encircled east of Bobruisk. In military historian Bruce Pirnie's view, "the Germans were more completely fooled prior to Operation Bagration than they had been prior to Operation Uranus [at Stalingrad]". Pirnie concluded, based largely on Bagration and Uranus with a look at other Second World War operations, that the Soviet military deception in Bagration was unsophisticated, but "clever and effective".

The Soviets succeeded in distorting OKH's intelligence picture, given that German intelligence had to rely mainly on radio intercept, aerial photography and agents left behind in the territory they had once held. Stavka deceived OKH by playing to their three sources of information; Stavka systematically denied the Germans real intelligence on Red Army forces as they concentrated for the attack, and revealed other real and simulated forces in other places. However Stavka may have come to do this, it "played well to the Germans' mental attitude".

Hitler's own reckless optimism and determination to hold on to captured territory at all costs encouraged him to believe the picture suggested by the Russians. Meanwhile, his advisors believed the Soviet Union was running out of men and materiel, with much less industrial production than it in fact had. Thus they underestimated the forces ranged against them, a belief encouraged by continued deception operations. Pirnie points out that it did not have to succeed in every aspect to be successful. In Belarus, the German armies involved had a good idea of the locations and approximate timing of Operation Bagration, but the higher levels, Army Group Centre and OKH failed to appreciate how strong the attacks would be, or the intention to encircle the Army Group. The "combination of display and concealment, directed at the highest command levels, typified their most successful deception."

=== Cuban Missile Crisis, 1962 ===
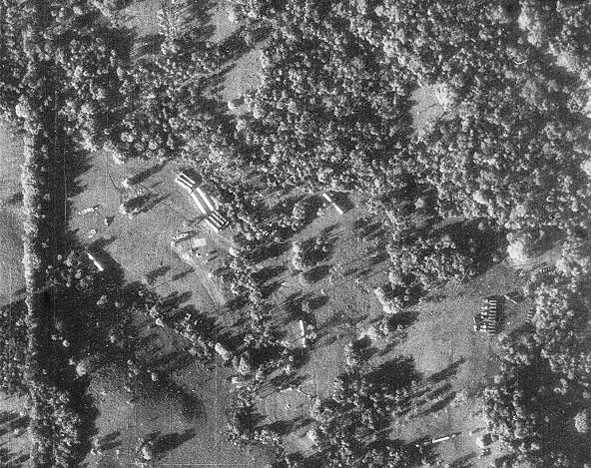
An American reconnaissance photograph showing Soviet nuclear missiles in Cuba, 14 October 1962

The Soviet intelligence services and the Soviet military used deceptive measures to conceal from the United States their intentions in Operation Anadyr, which led to the Cuban Missile Crisis. According to CIA analyst James Hansen, the Soviet Army most likely used large-scale battlefield deception before the Cuban Missile Crisis "more frequently and with more consistent success than any other army".

The soldiers involved in Anadyr were provided with winter clothing and informed they would be going to the east of the Soviet Union. On board ship, intelligence officers allowed the 40,000 soldiers involved on deck only during the hours of darkness. The force, including missiles, reached Cuba before US intelligence became aware of it.

Anadyr was planned from the start with elaborate denial and deception, ranging from the soldiers' ski boots and fleece-lined parkas to the name of the operation, a river and town in the chilly far east. Once America had become aware of Soviet intentions, deception continued in the form of outright denial, as when, on 17 October 1962, the embassy official Georgy Bolshakov gave President John F. Kennedy a "personal message" from the Soviet premier Nikita Khrushchev reassuring him that "under no circumstances would surface-to-surface missiles be sent to Cuba".

Hansen's analysis ends with a recognition of the Soviet advantage in deception in 1962. In Hansen's view, the fact that the Killian Report did not even mention adversarial denial and deception was an indication that American intelligence had not begun to study foreign D&D; it did not do so for another 20 years. Hansen considered it likely that with a properly-prepared "deception-aware analytic corps", America could have seen through Khrushchev's plan long before Maj. Heyser's revealing U-2 mission. In Hansen's view, it would take four decades before American intelligence fully understood the extent of Soviet deception before the Cuban Missile Crisis, especially the way the Soviets hid the truth of its strategic missile deployment behind a mass of lies, on "a scale that most US planners could not comprehend".

=== Czechoslovakia, 1968 ===
The Soviet Union made substantial use of deception while preparing for their military intervention of Czechoslovakia in 1968. The historian Mark Lloyd called the effect on the Prague Spring "devastating". When the Kremlin had failed to reverse the Czechoslovak leader Alexander Dubček's liberal reforms with threats, it decided to use force, masked by deception. The measures taken included transferring fuel and ammunition out of Czechoslovakia on a supposed logistics exercise; and confining most of their soldiers to barracks across the northern Warsaw Pact area. The Czechoslovak authorities thus did not suspect anything when two Aeroflot airliners made unscheduled landings at night, full of "fit young men".

The men cleared customs and travelled to the Soviet Embassy in the centre of Prague. There they picked up weapons and returned to the airport, taking over the main buildings. They at once allowed further aircraft to land uniformed Spetsnaz and airborne troops, who took over key buildings across Prague before dawn. Reinforcements were then brought in by road, in complete radio silence, leaving NATO electronic warfare units "confused and frustrated".

=== Ukraine, 2014 ===
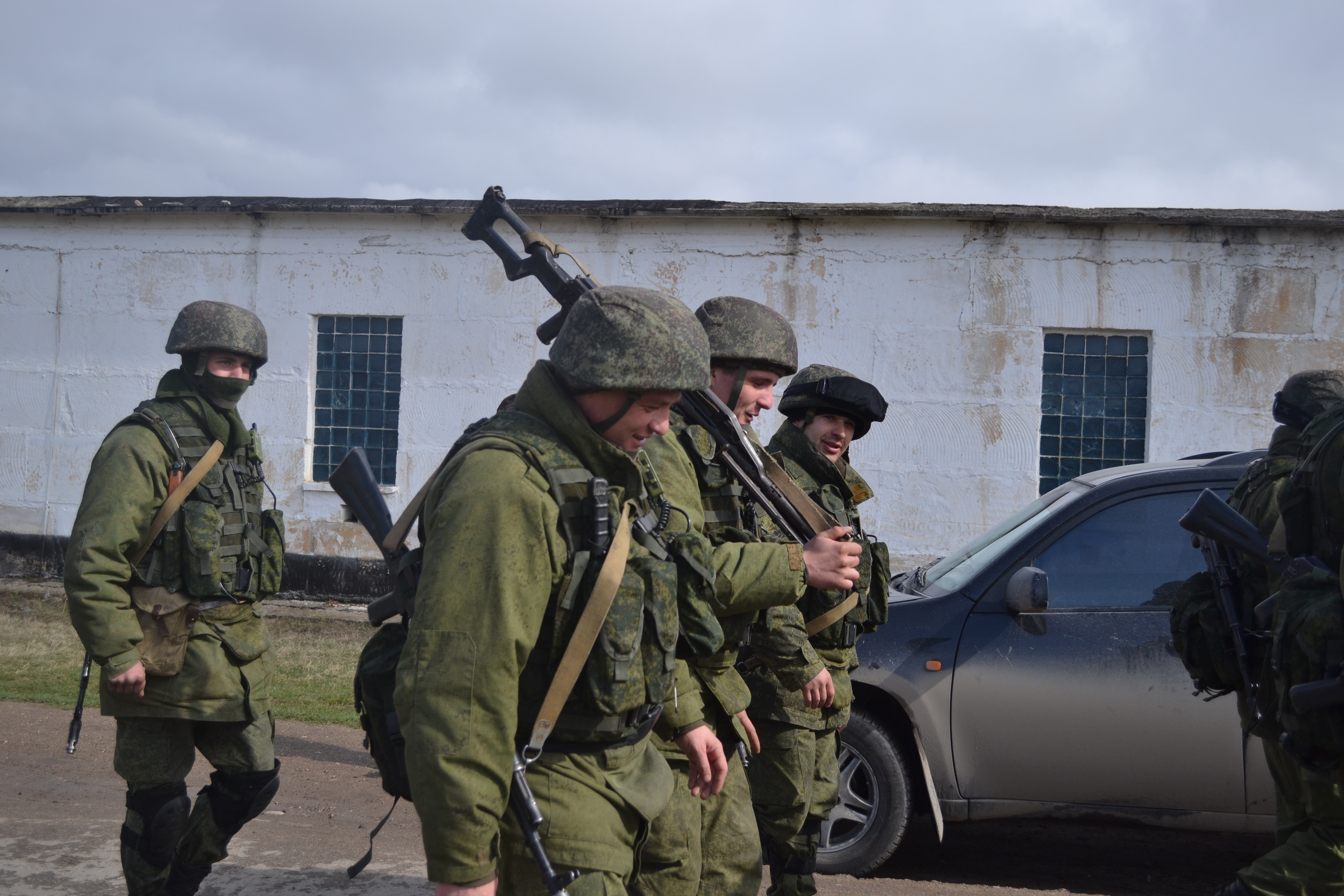
Soldiers with no insignia or badges of rank, Perevalne army base, Crimea, 9 March 2014

The 2014 annexation of Crimea was described in the West as maskirovka. As the BBC writer, Lucy Ash put it: "Five weeks later, once the annexation had been rubber-stamped by the Parliament in Moscow, Putin admitted Russian troops had been deployed in Crimea after all. But the lie had served its purpose. Maskirovka is used to wrong-foot your enemies, to keep them guessing." The area was swiftly occupied by so-called little green men, armed men in military trucks who came at night, with no insignia, so that even pro-Russian activists did not understand what was happening.

They were later revealed as Russian special forces, but at the time Vladimir Putin denied this. Time magazine reported in April 2014 that the troops in eastern Ukraine described themselves as Cossacks, whereas analysts in Ukraine and the West considered at least some of them to be Russian special forces. Their obscure origins made them seem more menacing and harder to deal with.

The article observed that the wearing of face masks (actually, balaclavas) was typical of the Russian tradition of military deception, making asking why they were worn, as one masked separatist remarked, "a stupid question". In April 2014, the Huffington Post asserted that "President Putin's game plan in Ukraine becomes clearer day by day despite Russia's excellent, even brilliant, use of its traditional maskirovka".

The subsequent war in the Donbas region of Ukraine has also been described as a Russian maskirovka campaign. As with Crimea, the conflict began when armed 'rebel' forces without military insignia began seizing government infrastructure. Unlike the action in Crimea, there were no Russian military bases to deploy soldiers from. Support for Russia amongst the local population was not as high, and Donbas was larger and less isolated than the peninsula.

A variety of deceptions were practised. Russia sent "humanitarian" convoys to Donbas; the first, of military trucks painted white, attracted much media attention, and was described as "a wonderful example of maskirovka" by Maj. Gen. Gordon 'Skip' Davis, a US Army General. However, regular Russian troops were captured by Ukraine numerous times, making denial of their involvement increasingly implausible.

== See also ==
- Active measures
- Fear, uncertainty and doubt
- Maneuver warfare
- Operational art
- Proxy war
- Salami tactics
- Soviet deep battle

== Sources ==
- Adair, Paul (2004) [1994]. "7. Maskirovka (Deception)". Hitler's Greatest Defeat: Disaster on the Eastern Front. London, England: Rigel, Cassell & Co. pp. 56–61. ISBN 978-0-304-35449-8.
- Albats, Evgeniia (1994). "Chapter 4: Who Was Behind Perestroika?". The State within a State: the KGB and Its Hold on Russia: Past, Present, and Future. Catherine A. Fitzpatrick, translator. New York: Farrar, Straus and Giroux. ISBN 978-0-374-52738-9.
- Bar-Joseph, Uri (2012). The Watchman Fell Asleep: The Surprise of Yom Kippur and Its Sources. SUNY Press. p. 25. ISBN 978-0-7914-8312-1.
- Beaumont, Roger (1982). Maskirovka: Soviet Camouflage, Concealment and Deception. College Station, Texas: Texas A&M University Press, Center for Strategic Technology, Texas Engineering Experiment Station. OCLC 9433325.
- Beevor, Antony (1999) [1998]. Stalingrad. Penguin. ISBN 978-0141032405.
- Beevor, Antony (2012). The Second World War. Weidenfeld & Nicolson. ISBN 978-0-297-84497-6.
- Blight, James G.; Allyn, Bruce J.; Welch, David A. (2002). Cuba on the Brink: Castro, the Missile Crisis, and the Soviet Collapse (2nd ed.). Lanham, Maryland: Rowman & Littlefield. p. 494. ISBN 978-0-7425-2269-5.
- Clark, Lloyd (2011). Kursk: The Greatest Battle: Eastern Front 1943. Headline. ISBN 978-0-7553-3639-5.
- Connor, William M (1987). Analysis of Deep Attack Operations: Operation Bagration, Belorussia, 22 June–29 August 1944. Diane Publishing. pp. 22–30. ISBN 978-1-4289-1686-9.
- Cubbage, Tom (2012). Handel, Michael I. (ed.). Strategic and Operational Deception. Routledge. p. 416. ISBN 978-1-136-28631-5.
- Frank, Willard C.; Gillette, Philip S. (1992). Soviet Military Doctrine from Lenin to Gorbachev, 1915–1991. Westport, Connecticut: Greenwood Publishing Group. p. 352. ISBN 978-0-313-27713-9.
- Gerwehr, Scott; Glenn, Russell W.; Johnson, Dana J.; Flanagan, Ann (2000). The Art of Darkness: Deception and Urban Operations. Rand Corporation. p. 33. ISBN 978-0-8330-4831-8.
- Glantz, David (1989). Soviet Military Deception in the Second World War. London: Routledge. Frank Cass. ISBN 978-0-7146-3347-3.
- Hansen, James H. (April 2007). "Learning from the Past: Soviet Deception in the Cuban Missile Crisis" (PDF). Studies in Intelligence. 46 (1): n.s. Archived from the original on June 7, 2010.
- Hutchinson, William (28 June 2004). "The Influence of Maskirovka on Contemporary Western Deception Theory". Proceedings of the 3rd European Conference on Information Warfare and Security: 165–174. ISBN 978-0-9547096-2-4.
- Jones, Andy (1 January 2004). Proceedings of the 3rd European Conference on Information Warfare and Security. Academic Conferences Limited. p. 166. ISBN 978-0-9547096-2-4.
- Lindley-French, Julian (2015). "NATO: Countering Strategic Maskirovka" (PDF). Canadian Defence & Foreign Affairs Institute. pp. 1–10.
- Lloyd, Mark (2003). The Art of Military Deception. Pen and Sword. pp. 126–127. ISBN 978-1-84468-010-8.
- Pirnie, Bruce R. (1985). "Soviet Deception Operations in World War II" (PDF). US Army Center of Military History. AD-A165 980. Archived (PDF) from the original on February 19, 2015.
- Pringle, Robert W. (2006). Historical Dictionary of Russian and Soviet Intelligence. Scarecrow Press. ISBN 978-0-8108-6482-5.
- Shea, Timothy C. (2002). "Post-Soviet Maskirovka, Cold War Nostalgia, and Peacetime Engagement". Military Review. 82 (3). United States Army Combined Arms Center. Archived from the original on 2015-02-16 – via Questia.
- Showalter, Dennis E. (27 August 2013). Armor and Blood: The Battle of Kursk: The Turning Point of World War II. Random House Publishing Group. p. 1930. ISBN 978-0-8129-9465-0.
- Smith, Charles L. (Spring 1988). "Soviet Maskirovko" (PDF). Airpower Journal.
- Thomas, Timothy L. (2004). "Russia's Reflexive Control Theory and the Military". Journal of Slavic Military Studies. 17 (2). Taylor & Francis: 237–256. doi:10.1080/13518040490450529. ISSN 1351-8046. S2CID 15779122.
- Vego, Milan N. (2009). Joint Operational Warfare: Theory and Practice. Government Printing Office. p. 112. ISBN 978-1-884733-62-8.
- Willmott, H. P. (May 24, 1984). June, 1944 (First ed.). Blandford Press. p. 154. ISBN 978-0-7137-1446-3.
- Yefinov, V. A.; Chermoshentsev, S. G. (1978). "Maskirovka". Sovetskaya Voennaya Entsiklopediya (Soviet Military Encyclopedia). Vol. 5. Moscow: Voyenizdat. pp. 175–77.
- Zaloga, Steven J. (January 15, 1996). Bagration, 1944: The Destruction of Army Group Centre (Paperback). Campaign (Book 42). London: Osprey Publishing. p. 7. ISBN 978-1-85532-478-7.
- Ziemke, Earl Frederick; Bauer, Magna E. (1987). Moscow to Stalingrad. Government Printing Office. pp. 443–445. ISBN 978-0-16-080081-8.
- Ziemke, Earl F. (1 January 1969). Battle for Berlin: End of the Third Reich (1st UK ed.). New York: Ballantine Books, Macdonald. p. 11. ISBN 978-0-356-02960-3.
