= Ammouliani =

Island in Greece

Ammouliani Αμμουλιανή
- Community
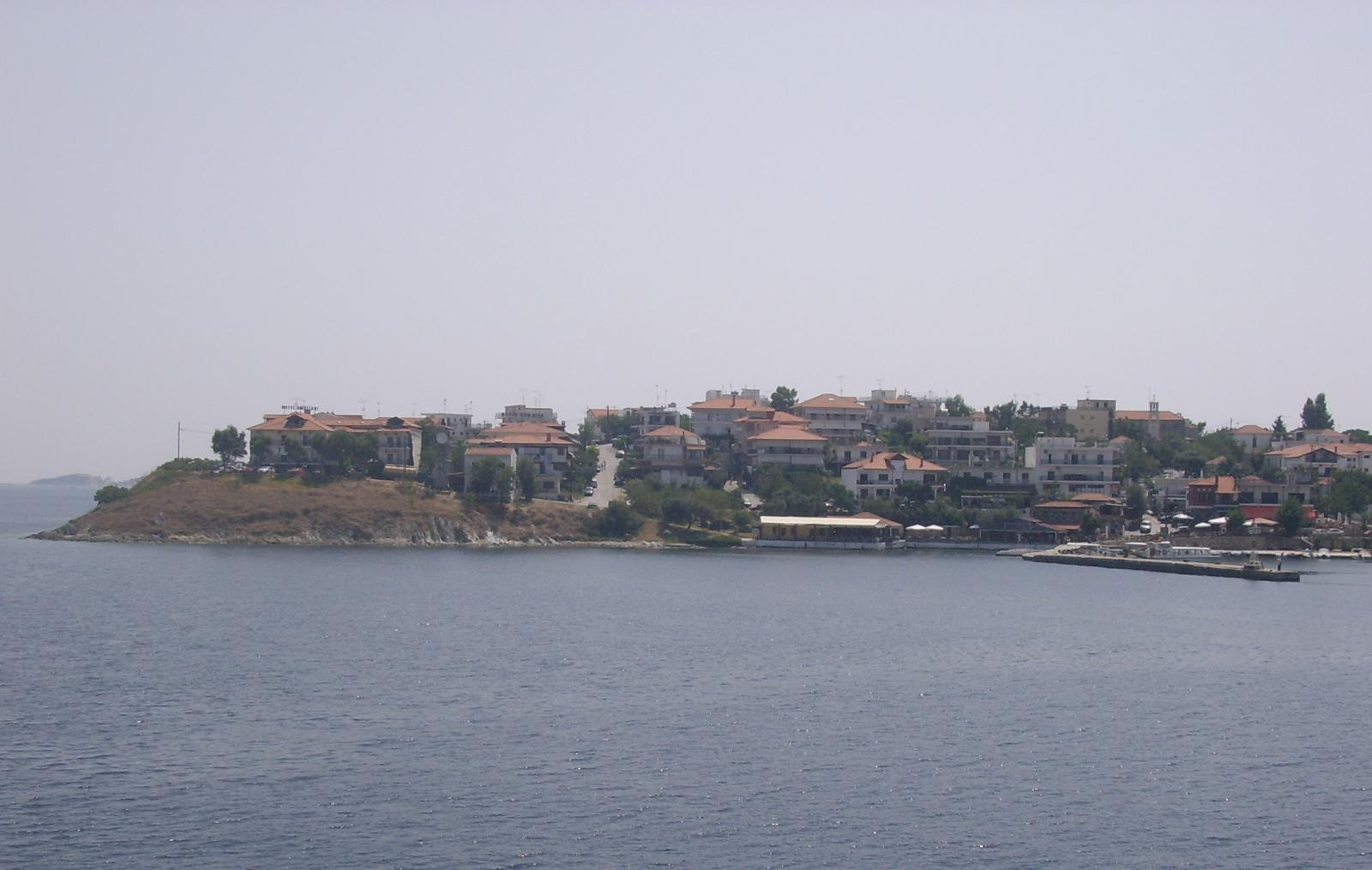

- Location within Greece
- Coordinates: 40°20′N 23°55.2′E
- Country: Greece
- Administrative region: Central Macedonia
- Regional unit: Chalkidiki
- Municipality: Aristotelis
- Municipal unit: Stagira-Akanthos

Population (2021)
  - Community: 521
- Time zone: UTC+2 (EET)
  - Summer (DST): UTC+3 (EEST)
- Vehicle registration: ΧΚ

Ammouliani (Greek: Αμμουλιανή [amuʎaˈni], Ammoulianí), also known as Amoliani, is an island in the Singitic Gulf in the Chalkidiki regional unit of northern Greece, about 120 km (75 mi) from Thessaloniki. It is the only permanently inhabited island of Chalkidiki. Administratively it is part of the municipal unit of Stagira-Akanthos.

== Geography ==
Ammouliani lies in the northern part of the Singitic Gulf of the Aegean Sea, between the peninsulas of Sithonia and Mount Athos. The island is located opposite the small port of Trypiti on the mainland of Chalkidiki.

== History ==
Until the early 1900s, Ammouliani was a dependency of Vatopedi Monastery of Mount Athos. In 1925, the island was given to refugee families who had come from islands of Propontis (Sea of Marmara) following the Asia Minor Disaster. The population of the island grew quickly and today the island has over 500 residents. It has become a tourist destination, with frequent transport from the mainland.

=== Historical population ===
Historical population
Year	Pop.	±%
1991	606	—
2001	547	−9.7%
2011	547	+0.0%
2021	521	−4.8%
