= Military deception =

Attempts to mislead enemy forces during warfare

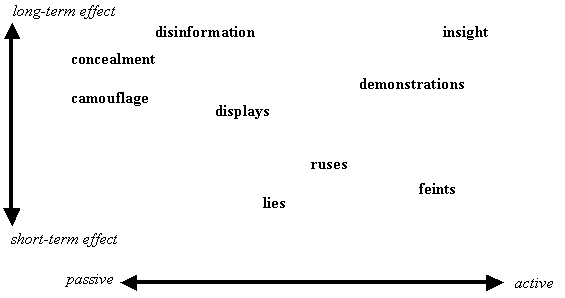
Spectrum of deception types, including: disinformation, concealment, camouflage, demonstrations, and feints.

Military deception (MILDEC) is an attempt by a military unit to gain an advantage during warfare by misleading adversary decision makers into taking action or inaction that creates favorable conditions for the deceiving force. This is usually achieved by creating or amplifying an artificial fog of war via psychological operations, information warfare, visual deception, or other methods. As a form of disinformation, it overlaps with psychological warfare. Military deception is also closely connected to operational security (OPSEC) in that OPSEC attempts to conceal from the adversary critical information about an organization's capabilities, activities, limitations, and intentions, or provide a plausible alternate explanation for the details the adversary can observe, while deception reveals false information in an effort to mislead the adversary.

Deception in warfare dates back to early history. The Art of War, an ancient Chinese military treatise, emphasizes the importance of deception as a way for outnumbered forces to defeat larger adversaries. Examples of deception in warfare can be found in ancient Egypt, Greece, and Rome, the Medieval Age, the Renaissance, and the European Colonial Era. Deception was employed during World War I and came into even greater prominence during World War II. In modern times, the militaries of several nations have evolved deception tactics, techniques and procedures into fully fledged doctrine.

== Definition ==
Many standard military activities can be considered deceptive, but not deception. For example, a unit may move into an assembly area to complete organizing and rehearsing prior to a mission. It is a standard deceptive tactic to camouflage the vehicles, equipment and personnel in the assembly area with the intent of confusing the enemy. Military deception is more complex than simple deceptive activities, with a unit deliberately planning and carrying out an elaborate effort that will cause a targeted adversary decision maker to take an action that is detrimental to the adversary and beneficial to the side employing deception. The exception in US doctrine is Deception In Support of OPSEC (DISO); rather than cause an adversary decision maker to take a specific action, DISO augments a friendly unit's Operations Security (OPSEC) plan to aid in concealing the friendly unit's most important mission details.

== Categories ==
In US doctrine, the three categories of deception are Joint Military Deception (MILDEC), Tactical Deception (TAC-D), and Deception In Support of OPSEC (DISO). In TAC-D, tactical-level commanders attempt to cause an enemy decision maker to act in a way that is unfavorable to the enemy and beneficial to the friendly tactical commander's objectives. Joint MILDEC is conducted to support military campaigns and major operations at the strategic level. It causes adversaries to take actions or inactions that are favorable to the friendly commander's objectives, typically at a unified combatant command level.

With DISO, the side employing deception enhances its OPSEC by causing the adversary's information and intelligence gathering and processing capability to either not notice important details of the deceiving force's operations, or to misinterpret those details. The benefit to the deceiving side is gained by preventing the adversary from gaining timely and accurate situational awareness.

== Types ==
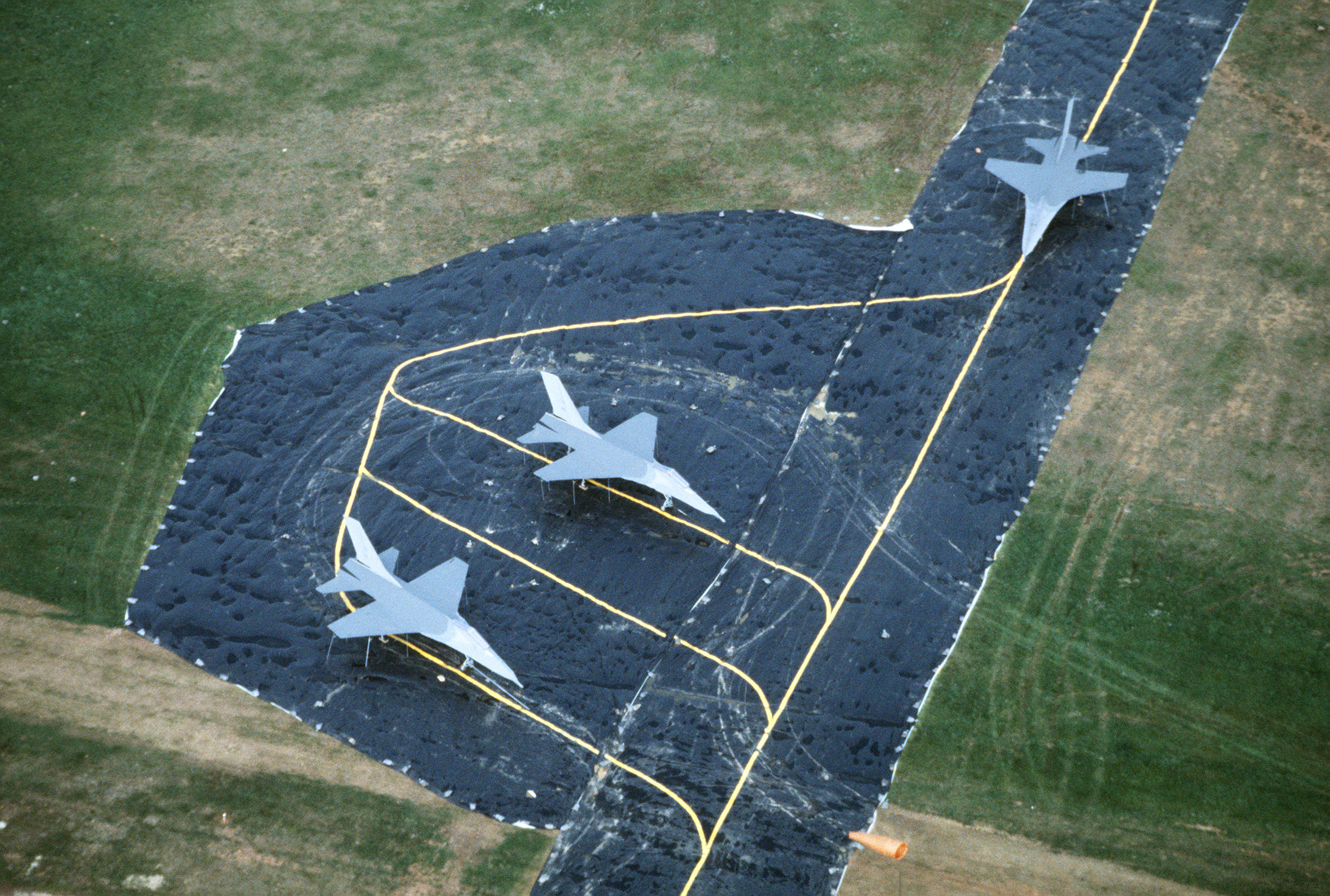
Dummy airbase and mock aircraft

Deception can be accomplished through either increasing or decreasing an adversary's understanding of the operating environment. Ambiguity increasing deception is intended to sow confusion in the mind of the enemy decision maker by presenting multiple possible friendly courses of action. Because the adversary does not know which is true, his reactions are delayed or paralyzed, which gives the friendly side an advantage. With ambiguity decreasing deception, the friendly side intends to make the adversary certain of the friendly course of action — certain, but wrong. As a result, the adversary will misallocate time, personnel, or resources, which enables the friendly side to obtain an advantage.

The Operation Bodyguard deception in World War II can be viewed as an ambiguity increasing deception that over time became ambiguity decreasing. Initially, the aim was to increase confusion among German planners and leaders by presenting the possibilities of Allied invasions at the Pas-de-Calais and Normandy in France, as well as the Balkans, southern France, and Norway. Eventually, the deception increased certainty on the German side by causing them to conclude that Calais was the real invasion site. When the Allies attacked at Normandy, they did so with the advantage of surprise.

== Tactics ==
Military deception may take place at the tactical, operational, and strategic levels of warfare. The five basic tactics include:

Diversion
Use of feints, demonstrations, displays, or ruses to draw the enemy's attention away from a friendly main effort and induce the enemy to concentrate resources at a time and place that is to the enemy's disadvantage.

Example: On the night of 17–18 August 1943, the Royal Air Force carried out Operation Hydra, the bombing of a World War II rocket research center at Peenemünde, a German town on the Baltic Sea. Over a period of time, the British had conditioned the Germans to expect and respond to attacks on Berlin by sending de Havilland Mosquito bombers along the same route towards the city. When the British executed Operation Hydra, the Germans believed eight Mosquitoes flying towards Berlin were the vanguard of yet another attack on the same target. As a result of this diversion, the Germans deployed the majority of their fighter aircraft over Berlin, which gave the British an advantage over Peenemünde.

Feint
An offensive action involving force-on-force contact with the adversary which deceives the adversary as to the location and/or time of the friendly side's main effort. A feint will cause the enemy to concentrate resources at an incorrect time and location. A series of feints will condition the enemy to friendly activities in the same location, causing the enemy to lower their guard or respond ineffectively to the friendly main effort.
Example: In May 1940, Nazi Germany's Army Group B attacked the Netherlands and Belgium. At the same time, Army Group A invaded France by attacking through the Ardennes towards the city of Sedan. Army Group B's attack was a feint intended to disguise Germany's main effort from British and French military leaders.

Demonstration

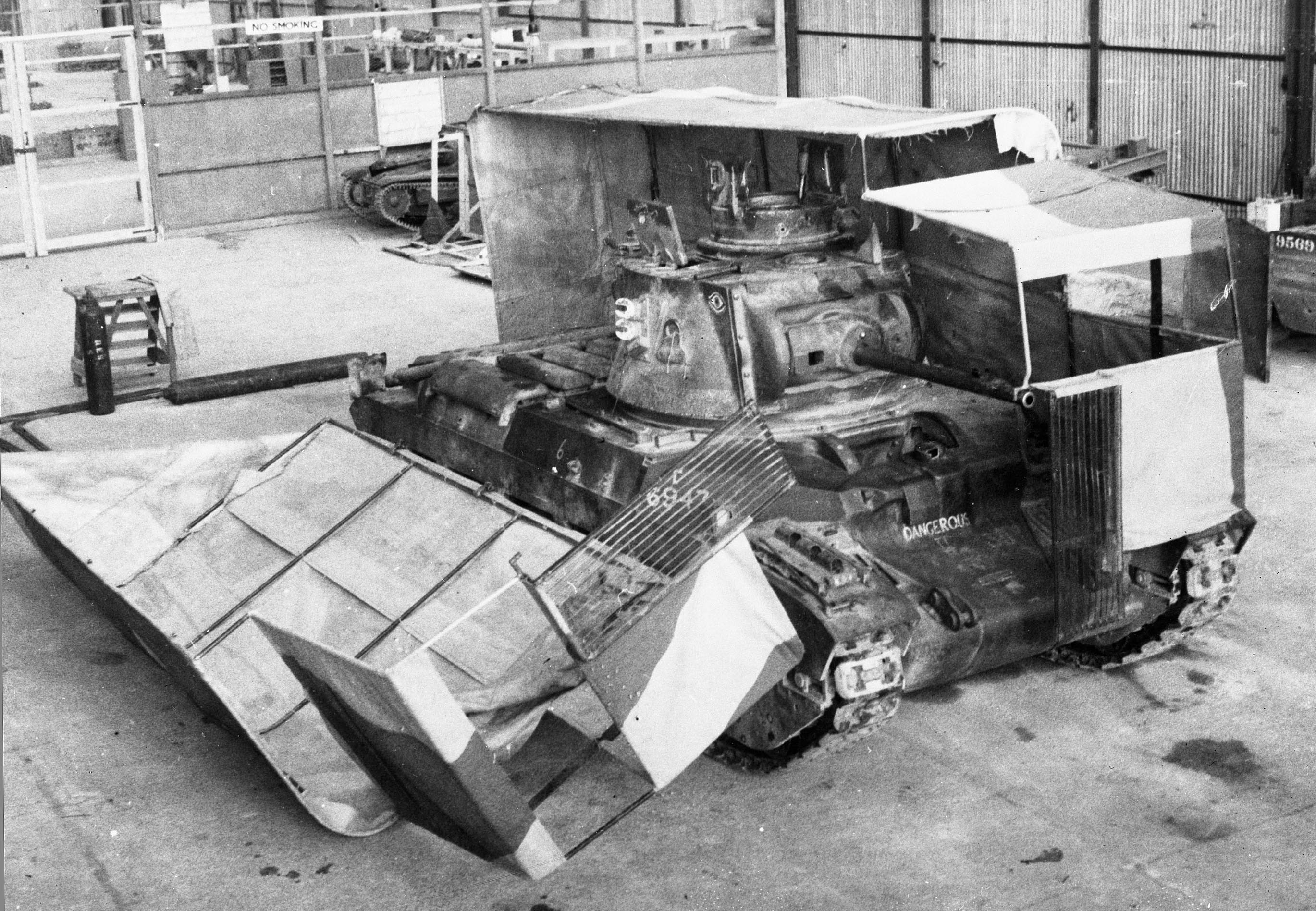
British "sunshields" were used to create displays during World War II

A demonstration presents a show of force similar to a feint, but avoids actual force-on-force contact with the adversary. The intent of a demonstration is for the adversary to incorrectly determine the time and location of the friendly main effort, which gives the friendly side an advantage by causing the adversary to incorrectly allocate resources, move to the wrong location, or fail to move.
Example: During the Peninsula campaign of the American Civil War, Union commander George B. McClellan believed he faced a stronger Confederate force commanded by John B. Magruder than he actually did. Magruder reinforced McClellan's perception with numerous demonstrations, including parading his soldiers where they could be viewed by Union observers, concealing them as they moved back to the start point, then parading them again. McClellan concluded that he was outnumbered and decided to retreat.

Ruse
The deliberate exposure to the enemy of false information that causes the enemy to reach an incorrect conclusion about friendly intentions and capabilities. A ruse is a trick of warfare that relies on guile to contribute to a larger deception plan.
Example: The creation of the fictional Major William Martin ("The Man Who Never Was") as a British officer carrying important World War II battle plans. As part of the Operation Mincemeat deception that concealed the location of the planned Allied invasion of Sicily, the Allies intended for the Nazis to acquire the false documents, which indicated a planned Allied invasion of Greece and the Balkans, and then incorrectly allocate troops and materiel.

Display
The static portrayal of activity, troops, or equipment. A display is intended to deceive the adversary's visual observation capability, causing him to believe the friendly force is in a location other than where it is, that it has a capacity or capability it does not possess, or that it does not have a capacity or capability that it does possess.
Example: The Allied use of "sunshields" in Operation Bertram and inflatable decoys in Operation Bodyguard during World War II to deceive the enemy as to the size, location and objectives of Allied forces.

These basic deception tactics are often used in combination with each other as part of a larger deception plan.

== Legality ==
Adherents to Protocol I (1977) of the Geneva Conventions agree not to engage in acts of perfidy during the conduct of warfare. Perfidious conduct is a deceitful action in which one side promises to act in good faith with the intention of breaking that promise to gain an advantage. Examples include one side raising a flag of truce to entice an enemy to come into the open and take them as prisoners of war, then opening fire on the uncovered adversary. Additional examples include misusing protected signs and symbols, such as the red cross, crescent, and crystal, to conceal weapons and ammunition by making them appear to be a medical facility.

== Axioms, maxims, and principles ==
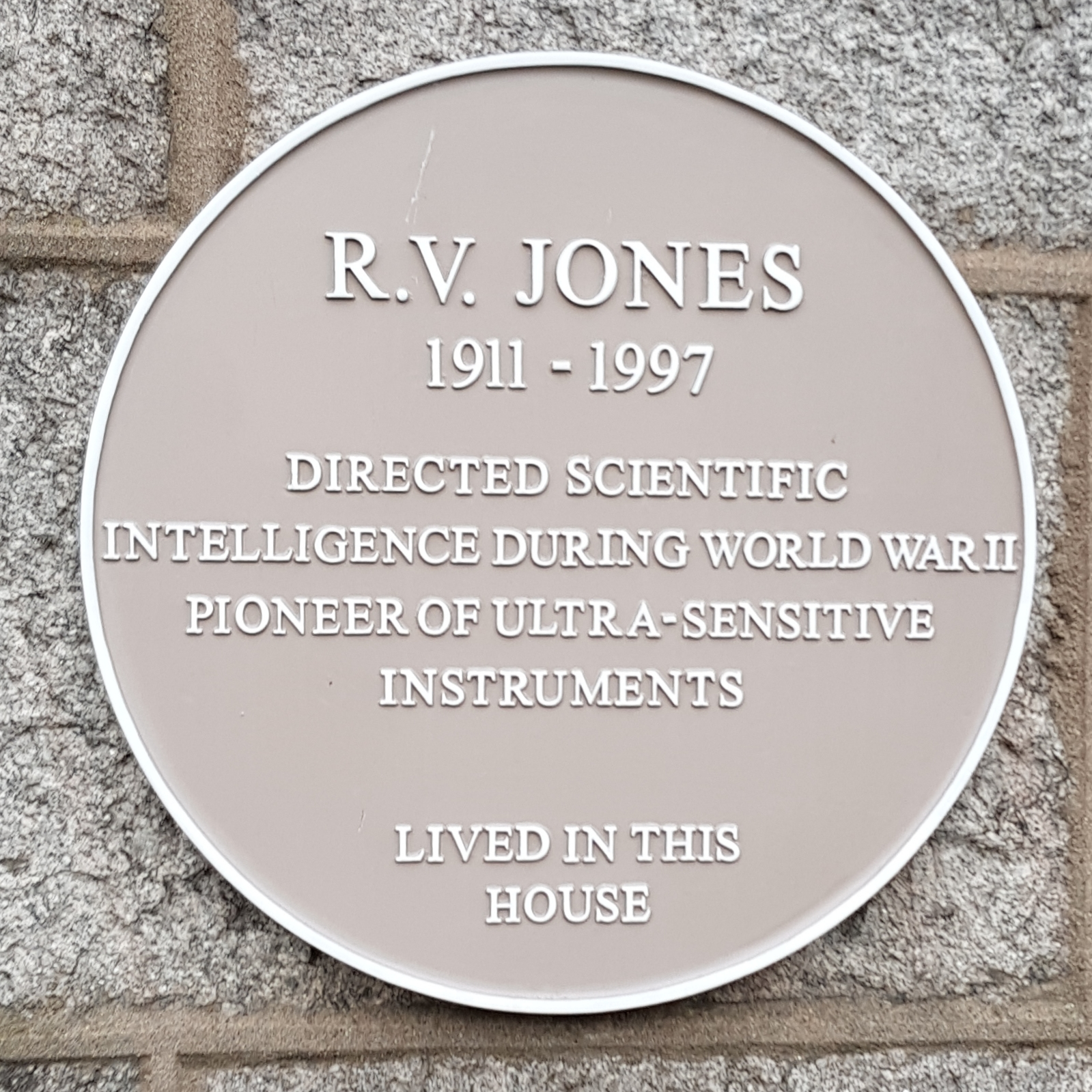
Plaque memorializing Reginald Victor Jones at his former home in Aberdeen, Scotland

The development of modern military deception doctrine has led to the codification of several rules and maxims. In U.S. doctrine, three of the most important are expressed as Magruder's Principle, the Jones' Dilemma, and Care in the Placement of Deceptive Material (Avoid Windfalls).

=== Magruder's Principle ===
Named for Confederate general John B. Magruder, the principle asserts that it is easier to convince a target to hold on to a pre-existing belief than it is to convince a target of something it does not believe. Examples include the Allies of World War II making use in the Operation Mincemeat deception of the pre-existing German belief that Greece and the Balkans would be their next invasion target after North Africa, when the Allies actually intended to invade Sicily.

=== Jones' Dilemma ===
Named for British scientist Reginald Victor Jones, who played an important role in the Allied effort during World War II, the Jones dilemma indicates that the greater the number of intelligence and information gathering and transmitting resources available to the deception target, the more difficult it is to deceive the target. Conversely, the more of the target's intelligence and information systems that are manipulated in a deception plan or denied to the target, the more likely the target is to believe the deception. One reason the World War II Operation Bodyguard deception was accepted as true on the German side is that Germany's ability to acquire information about activities in England was limited, enabling the Allies to manipulate the few German intelligence gathering resources that were available.

=== Avoid Windfalls ===
If a deception target obtains deceptive information too easily ("too good to be true"), the target is unlikely to act on it and the deception will fail. This requires deception planners to take care in placing deceptive information so that it will appear to have been acquired in a seemingly natural manner. The deception target is then able to assemble details from multiple sources into a coherent, believable, but untrue story. The best deception plans co-opt the enemy's skepticism through requiring enemy participation, either by expending time and resources in obtaining the deceptive information, or by devoting significant effort to interpreting it. In an example of valid information being dismissed as a windfall, early in World War II a plane carrying German officers to Cologne became lost in bad weather and landed in Belgium. Before being arrested by Belgian authorities, the Germans attempted to burn the papers they were carrying, which included copies of the actual invasion plans for Belgium and the Netherlands. Belgian authorities discounted this true information as false because of the ease with which they obtained it.

=== Multiple Forms of Surprise ===
Friendly events about which an adversary can be deceived are described in the mnemonic SALUTE-IS, which stands for Size, Activity, Location, Unit, Time, Equipment, Intent, and Style. The maxim indicates that the more of these categories the friendly side can deceive the adversary about, the more likely the adversary is to believe the deception. Conversely, if there are plans and activities about which the adversary is already aware, attempting to deceive him about them is unlikely to succeed. In Operation Bodyguard, the Germans knew there would be an invasion on the coast of France, that it would happen in 1944, and that it would be based in England. They did not know the exact date and the exact location. The Allies concentrated their deception on the SALUTE-IS details the Germans did not know about, and did not attempt to deceive them about what they already knew.

== Planning process ==
The doctrine for planning deception has been codified over time. In the U.S. military, this doctrine begins with understanding the deception target's cognitive process. Expressed as "See-Think-Do", this understanding of the adversary considers what information has to be conveyed to the target through what medium for the target to develop the perception of the situation that will cause the enemy to take an action beneficial to the friendly side. In the planning process, "See-Think-Do" is considered in reverse order—what does the friendly side want the enemy to do as a result of the deception, what perceptions will the target have to form to take the action, and what information needs to be transmitted to the target through which medium so that the target will develop the desired perception.

As an example, the intent for Operation Bodyguard was for Germany to allocate forces away from Normandy ("Do"). The perception the Allies wanted to create in the mind of the deception target (Hitler) was that the Allies were planning to invade at Calais ("Think"). The information the Allies conveyed to the target to create the perception included the false radio traffic, dummy equipment displays, and deceptive command messages of the fictional First United States Army Group ("See").

== Counterdeception ==
Counterdeception refers to efforts by the friendly side to negate, neutralize, or diminish the effects of adversary deception. It also includes friendly efforts to gain an advantage from a foreign deception operation. The intelligence warfighting function (S2 or G2 on a US Army staff) plays a central role in identifying enemy deception operations. Deception planners advise and assist by understanding adversary deception doctrine, techniques, capabilities, limitations, and previously employed techniques.

Once an adversary's deception has been identified, friendly commanders and staff can determine how to respond. Possible actions include exploitation by allowing the adversary's deception to continue so that he wastes time, manpower, and resources on an activity that will not provide a benefit (counter-counterdeception). The side uncovering the deception can also expose it, gaining a psychological victory by revealing the adversary to be incompetent at military planning and execution, or dishonest in the sense that their actions do not match their words.

== Modern advances ==
=== Cyber ===
Cyber attacks can be combined with electronic attacks to deceive an adversary's command and control capabilities. In 1999, the US carried out a proto-cyber attack by accessing Serbia's telephone network, which was linked to the Serbian military's air defense artillery (ADA) systems. Once in the network, the US was able to inject false information onto Serbian ADA radar screens.

Cyber can also contribute to ambiguity increasing deception by hiding vital details in a sea of useless data. This technique degrades an adversary's ability to exploit information by making them invest considerable time, effort, and resources to search for the important information; if they find the hidden details, it is likely to be too late to make use of them.

=== Electronic attack ===
Electronic attack can be employed in military deception to blind adversary sensors. As an example, communications between radar stations can be degraded by 'invading' and taking over an adversary network, preventing it from detecting friendly aircraft. In 2007, Israel flew fighter aircraft missions in the Deir ez-Zor campaign against Syria. Later reports indicate that planes flew unhindered over Syrian anti-aircraft systems after deploying a virus that allowed the Israeli military to detect and locate anti-aircraft radars. The virus then penetrated the Syrian communication network, exploited computer loopholes that enabled The Israelis to view the same information the Syrians were looking at in real time, and insert false information to deceive the Syrians.

The US Army has tested systems that replicate unit radio and digital signatures, which could be employed to deceive enemy signal collection. One system tested in 2024 would be able to collect the profile of a command post (CP), then rebroadcast it. By combining this technique with decoys, a friendly force could visually and electronically mimic a CP, preventing the adversary from determining the location of the real one.

=== Artificial Intelligence ===
Militaries increasingly use AI to speed up planning, enhance wargaming, and refine data into actionable intelligence, which aids leaders to assess situations and make decisions more rapidly than was previously possible. But while AI can enhance capability and capacity, it is also susceptible to deception. This is especially true of the sensor that initially collects the information. If the friendly side knows an adversary's AI-enabled sensor will react to specific types of information, the friendly side can feed that sensor deceptive information that will trigger a reaction beneficial to the friendly side.

AI is increasingly used to create realistic-looking videos and photos. Adversaries then attempt to influence perceptions of a conflict by publishing these fake images globally via social media. Immediately after the outbreak of the war between Israel and Iran in June 2025, social media platforms were inundated with images of widespread destruction in Tel Aviv, Israeli planes shot down and surrounded by cheering Iranian crowds, Pakistani trucks carrying ballistic missiles to Iran in support of the war effort, and protesters in Tel Aviv denouncing Israel's attack and calling for peace. All of it was fake, and all intended to deceptively shape the narrative in favor of Iran.

=== Drones ===
Unmanned vehicles and weapons of all types are increasingly used in military deception. In December 2024, Ukrainian forces attacked Russian positions near Lyptsi in Ukraine's Kharkiv region. The all-unmanned attack included deception; drones dropped speakers behind Russian lines to play recordings of Ukrainian vehicles and voices, making it appear that soldiers were present in areas where they were not. As the Russians focused on the perceived threat, uncrewed Ukrainian ground combat vehicles (UGV) attacked from a different direction, cleared landmines, and fired on Russian positions. At the same time, first-person view (FPV) drones provided both overwatch to enable command and control, as well as additional attack capability. No Ukrainian soldiers crossed the battle line, but deception including unmanned vehicles enabled Ukraine to defeat Russian forces and seize the objective.

In 2025 and 2026, China reportedly conducted regular drone flights over the South China Sea. The drones transmitted false transponder signals to make them appear as other aircraft, including a Belarusian cargo plane and a British fighter jet. Experts on China's military indicated that the drones would likely not fool air traffic controllers or military radars, they could create confusion during a conflict, enabling China to hide surveillance activities, or enhance disinformation by enabling China to falsely blame others for bad acts such as aerial bombing.

=== Space ===
Satellites can use tactical decoys to confuse sensors on Anti-satellite weapons (ASAT). Beta versions of such decoys consist of an inflatable device designed to mimic the size, shape, and radar signature of a satellite. Because they are inflatable, multiple decoys can be stored on the real satellite, ready for immediate employment when needed. These decoys can also deceive an adversary about the space-based capacity of the side employing deception by concealing the locations of the real satellites, or by making the side employing decoys appear to have more satellites than it actually has.

Space-based electromagnetic (EM) decoys can also be used to mimic the radio frequency (RF) signature of a satellite, similar to aircraft that use airborne EM decoys. If fielded, these EM decoys would deceive an adversary about the location of the deceiver's real satellites, or inflate the deceiver’s space-based capability and capacity by making it appear to have more satellites than it actually does.

== In fiction ==
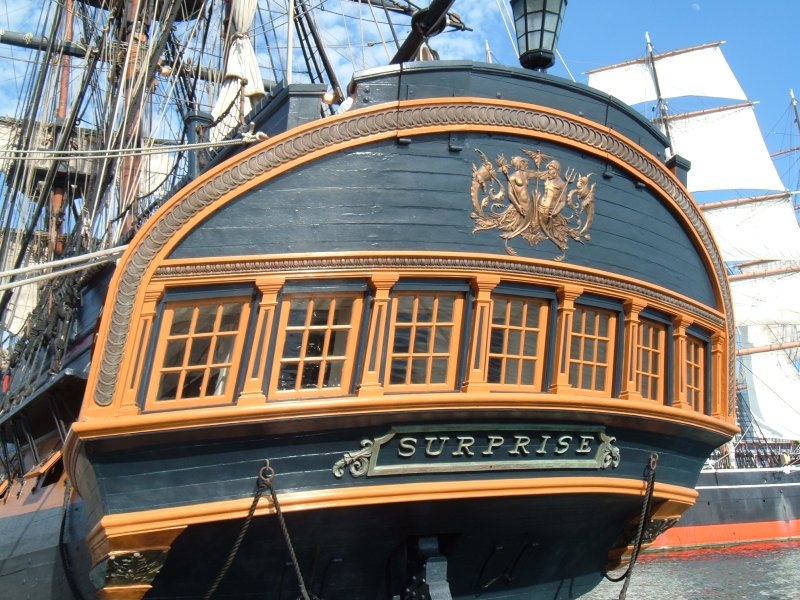
In the 2003 film Master and Commander: The Far Side of the World, the ship Surprise escapes pursuers by creating a decoy raft for nighttime use which mimics the lanterns visible on the ship's stern.

Fictional examples of military deception include the 1966 Star Trek episode "The Corbomite Maneuver". When Enterprise is held by the tractor beam of an alien ship, its commander announces his intention to destroy Enterprise. Captain James T. Kirk informs the alien commander, Balok, that Enterprise is on a peaceful mission. Balok does not accept Kirk's explanation, so Kirk responds with a deceptive bluff, claiming Enterprise is outfitted with a secret doomsday device made of "Corbomite". Destruction of Enterprise will trigger the Corbomite device, resulting in destruction of the alien ship. Balok uses a smaller ship to tow Enterprise to a remote area where it can be safely destroyed. Enterprise breaks free from the smaller ship's tractor beam, but damages the smaller ship in the process. Kirk then leads a boarding party to assist the aliens. Kirk's party meets Balok, who is alone and says he was testing Enterprise to discern whether Kirk's claims of peaceful intentions were true. Satisfied by their willingness to render aid to a perceived enemy, Balok expresses a desire to learn more about humans and their culture.

A scene from the 2000 film The Patriot depicts Patriot militia leader Benjamin Martin employing deceptive decoys when negotiating for the release of several members of his command who have been taken prisoner. Martin offers to exchange eighteen British officers, whom he claims are held on a hillside near the British headquarters. The British commander, General Cornwallis views the hill with a spyglass, observes figures in British uniforms who appear to be prisoners, and agrees to the exchange. After Martin and his men leave, the officer dispatched by Cornwallis to recover the British prisoners discovers they are scarecrows in captured British uniforms.

In the 2003 film Master and Commander: The Far Side of the World, Captain Jack Aubrey of HMS Surprise is pursued by the French privateer Acheron. When Acheron appears likely to catch Surprise, Aubrey orders construction of a raft with sails, which contains lanterns arranged in the same pattern as those visible on the stern of Surprise. After night falls, a member of Aubrey's crew lights the raft's lanterns while another crewman douses the lanterns on Surprise. After recovering the crewman from the raft, Aubrey has it cut loose. The darkened Surprise then escapes on a new course while Acheron pursues the decoy.

== Opinions ==
Opinions vary among military strategists and authors as to the value of military deception. For example, the two books on warfare usually considered the most famous classics, Sun Tzu's The Art of War and Clausewitz's On War have diametrically opposed views. Sun Tzu emphasizes military deception and considers it the key to victory. (Note: Such as in the chapter on Estimates, verse 17: "All warfare is based on deception".) Clausewitz argues that the fog of war prevents a commander from having a clear understanding of the operating environment, so creating some sort of false appearance, particularly on a large scale, is unlikely to be meaningful. Because of the cost and effort, Clausewitz argues that from a cost-benefit analysis, a large deception is an acceptable part of a course of action only under special circumstances.

== See also ==
- Demoralization (warfare)
- Denial and deception
- Empty Fort Strategy
- Feint
- Haversack Ruse
- Maskirovka
- Outline of war
- Ruse of war
- Signaling game
