= Megali Panagia, Chalkidiki =

Megali Panagia Μεγάλη Παναγιά
- Community
- Location within Greece
- Coordinates: 40°29′N 23°39′E
- Country: Greece
- Administrative region: Central Macedonia
- Regional unit: Chalkidiki
- Municipality: Aristotelis
- Municipal unit: Panagia

Population (2021)
  - Community: 2,367
- Time zone: UTC+2 (EET)
  - Summer (DST): UTC+3 (EEST)

Megali Panagia is a big village in Chalkidiki peninsula. It is located in the east of Chalkidiki prefecture, 80 kilometres from Thessaloniki and 12 from Arnaia, built at 440 meters height, in the slopes of the hill named Chtikela. Until 2011 it was the seat of local municipality (Panagia municipality). Today it is included in Aristotelis municipality.

== History ==
In the past the village was named Revenikia. In 1928 took the current name (which means Great Virgin Mary) that related with the near pilgrimage, dedicated to Virgin Mary. The oldest references about the village date back in Byzantine era. In the Ottoman period the village belonged to the Mademochoria. During the Greek War of Independence it was burnt by the Turks. A part of the village was destroyed by the big earthquake in 1932, centered in Ierissos. Many disasters in the village were noted during Second World War.

== Historical population ==
Historical population
Year	Pop.	±%
1991	2,620	—
2001	2,597	−0.9%
2011	2,592	−0.2%
2021	2,367	−8.7%

== Sights ==
The most known sight in vicinity is the pilgrimage dedicated to Virgin Mary. It was built in 1863 and was rebuilt after the earthquake in 1932. Another important sight is Panagouda. It's about an old church inside the village, built in 1007. Near the village there is a notable, arched, old, bridge made of stone.
