= Pyrgadikia =

Pyrgadikia Πυργαδίκια
- Community
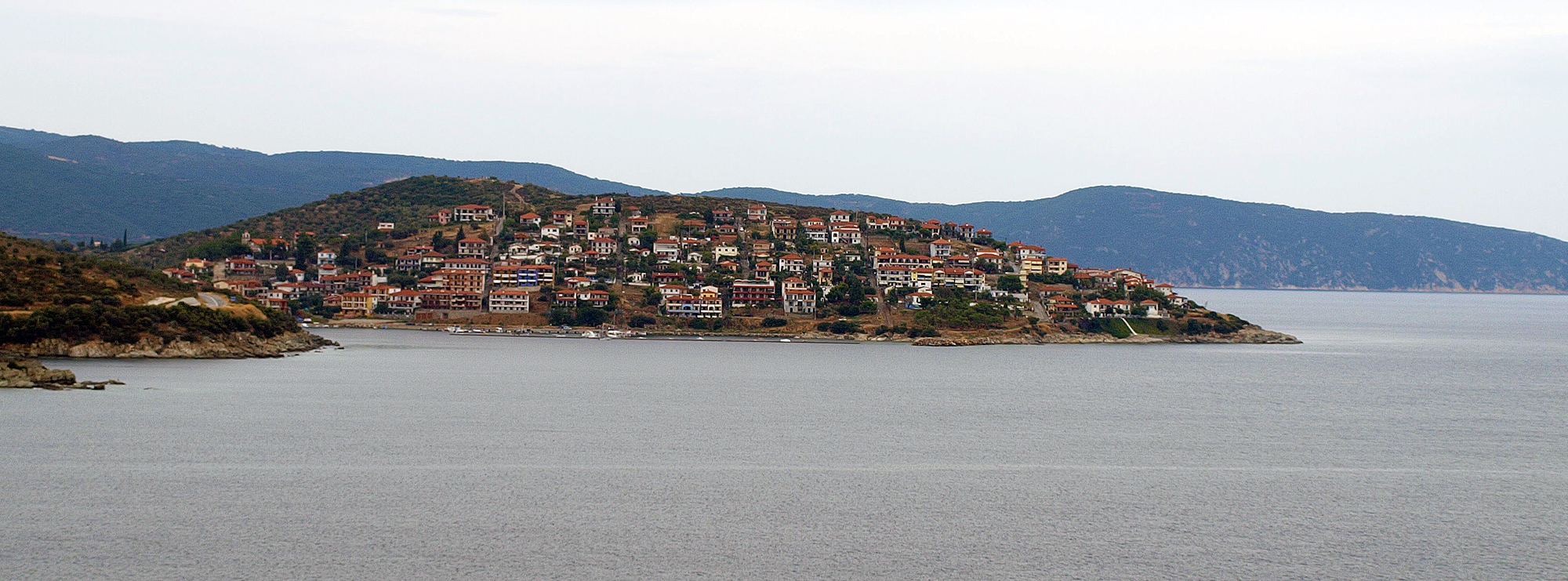
- General view of Pyrgadikia

- Location within Greece
- Coordinates: 40°23′N 23°42′E
- Country: Greece
- Administrative region: Central Macedonia
- Regional unit: Chalkidiki
- Municipality: Aristotelis

Population (2021)
  - Community: 284
- Time zone: UTC+2 (EET)
  - Summer (DST): UTC+3 (EEST)

Pyrgadikia (Greek: Πυργαδίκια) is a Greek village in the Chalkidiki peninsula. It is located in the south-eastern part of Chalkidiki (approximately 110 km south-east of Thessaloniki), built on the coast of Siggitikos Bay (part of the Aegean Sea). It is part of the Aristotelis municipality and the Panagia municipal unit. The central church of the village is dedicated to Panagia and celebrated every year on the eighth of September.

== History ==
The name of the village probably derives from the phrase "peri Gardikeia" (around Gardikeia) that ended up to Pyrgadikeia and finally Pyrgadikia. During the Byzantine era, the village was mentioned by its current name. After the Greco-Turkish War, many refugees from the village of Afthoni (located on the Marmara Island) relocated to Pyrgadikia. Today the educational and cultural society of Pyrgadikia is named Afthoni after the village of the same name.

=== Historical population ===
Census	Settlement	Community
1991	402	
2001	331	533
2011	320	377
2021	249	284

== Tourism ==
The primary occupation of the residents is providing tourist services. The village includes a Plaka area where tourists dine and relax. In addition, the village is surrounded by many beaches. Some of the nearby beaches include Salonikios Beach, Gyalikes Beach, Eirini Beach, Agios Theodoros Beach and Latomeio Beach. The most well known beach is Campus Beach.
