= Singitic Gulf =

Gulf in Northeastern Greece

- Σιγγιτικός Κόλπος (Greek)
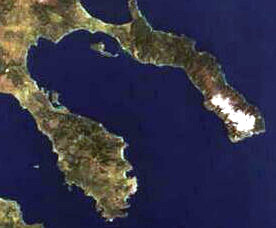
- Satellite view of the Singitic Gulf, with the island of Ammouliani shown in the north

- Location of the Singitic Gulf within Greece
- Location: Central Macedonia
- Coordinates: 40.2612°N 23.9010°E
- Type: Gulf
- Part of: Aegean Sea
- Basin countries: Greece

The Singitic Gulf (Greek: Σιγγιτικός Κόλπος, romanized: Singitikos Kolpos), also known as the Mount Athos Gulf or the Holy Mountain Gulf (Greek: Κόλπος Αγίου Όρους, romanized: Kolpos Agiou Oros), is a gulf of the Thracian Sea, part of the northern Aegean Sea, in Chalkidiki, Greece.

The gulf lies between the peninsulas of Sithonia to the west and Mount Athos to the east. The island of Ammouliani sits in the northeastern portion of the gulf along Mount Athos.

Several monasteries of Mount Athos are located along the eastern shores of the Singitic Gulf. The gulf is known for its clear waters and small coastal settlements along the Sithonia coastline.

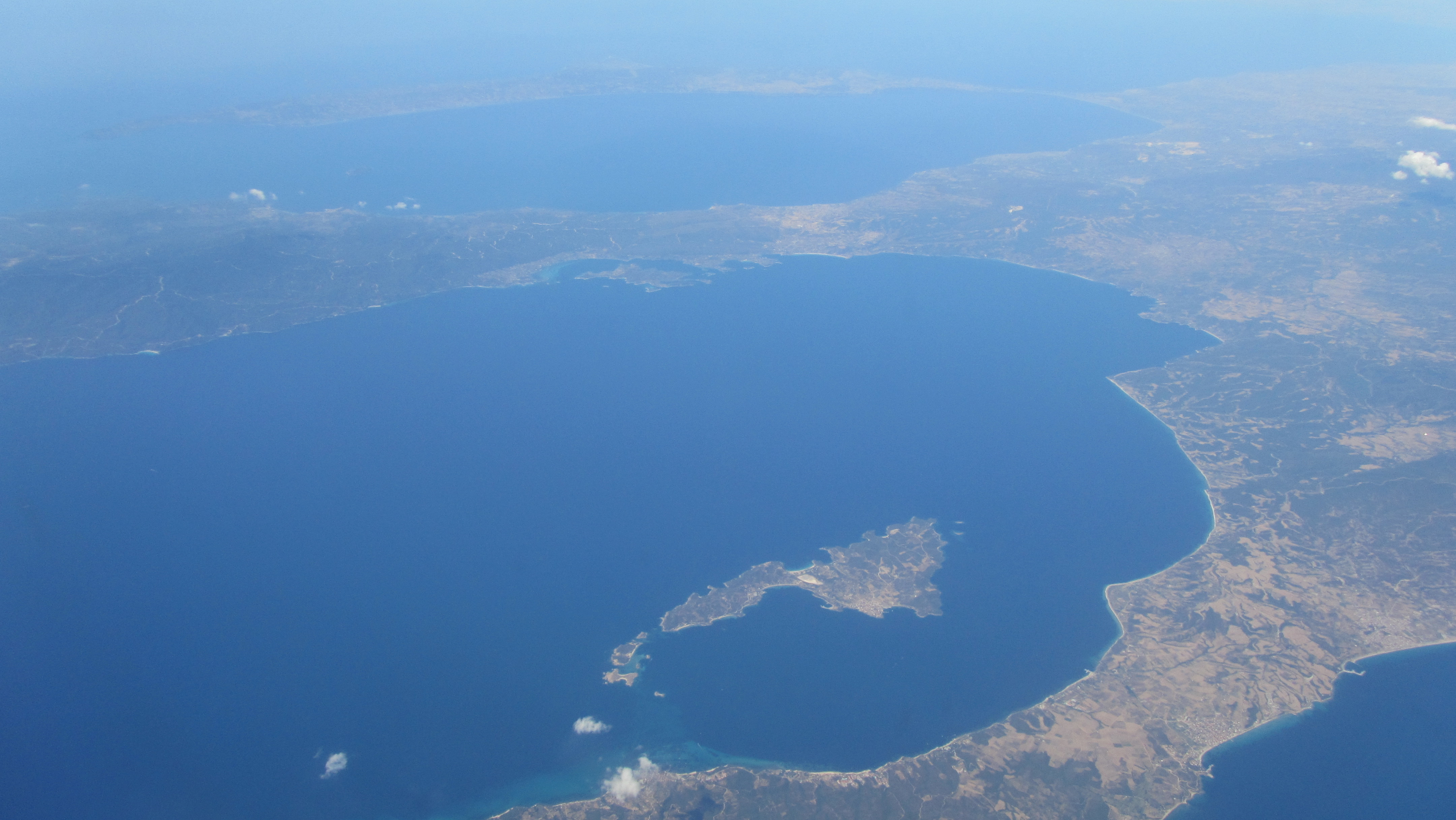
Aerial view of the Singitic Gulf
